= Outline of Melbourne =

Overview of and topical guide to the city of Melbourne, in Australia

The following outline is provided as an overview of and topical guide to Melbourne:

Melbourne – Largest city in Victoria, second-largest city in Australia and Oceania. It is located in the South-East of Australia, and is a major economic centre in the Asia-Pacific. The city is home to 4,917,750 people as of the 2021 census.

== General information ==
- Pronunciation: English: /ˈmɛlbərn/ MEL-bərn, locally [ˈmæɫbən], elsewhere also /ˈmɛlbɔːrn/ MEL-born
- Common English name(s): Melbourne
- Official English name(s): Melbourne
- Adjectival(s): Melburnian
- Demonym(s): Melburnian

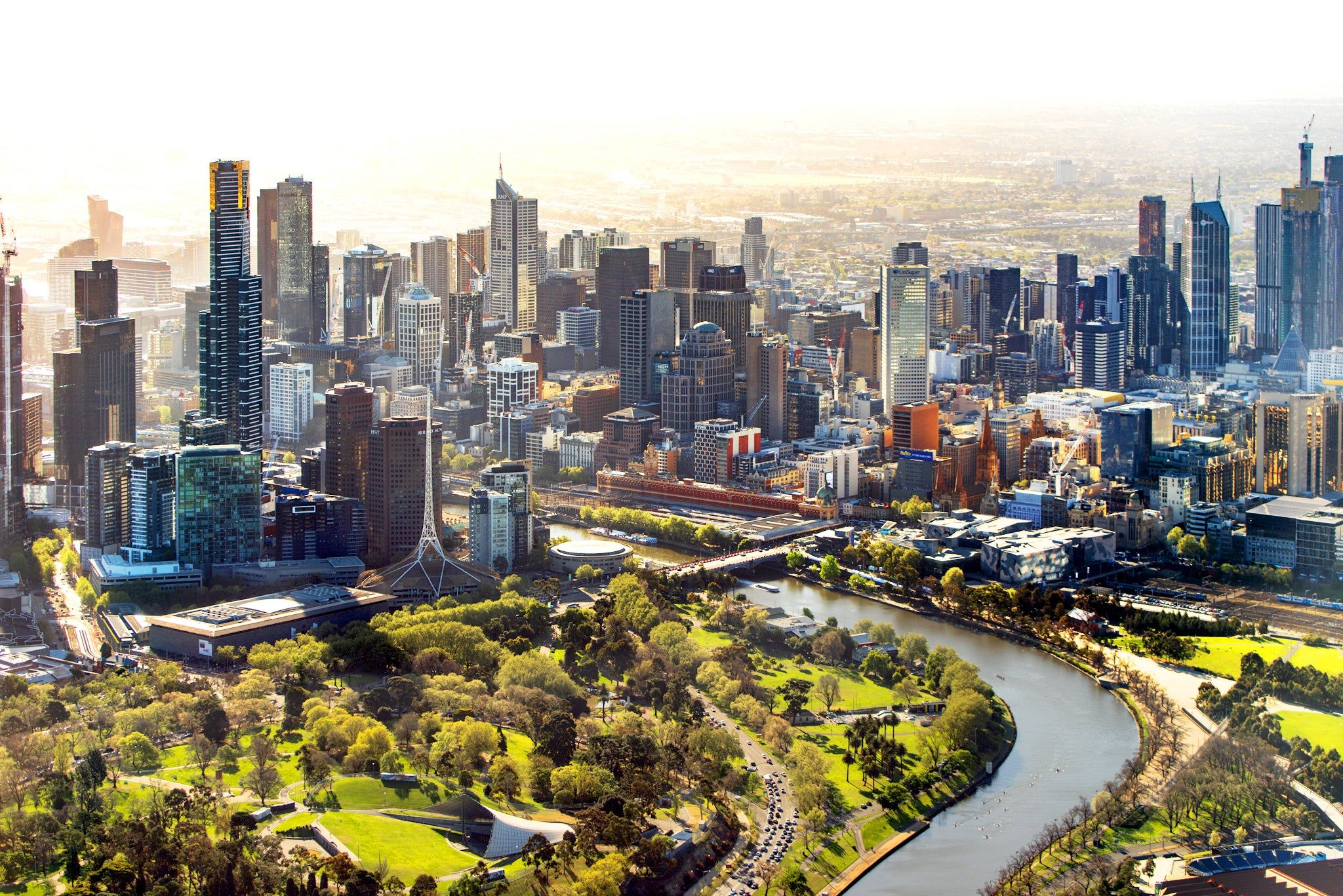
Melbourne Skyline

== Geography ==
Geography of Melbourne

- Melbourne is:
  - a city
  - a state capital
    - capital of Victoria
- Population of Melbourne: 4,917,750 (2021 census)
- Area of Melbourne: 9,993 km^{2} (3,858.3 sq mi)

Melbourne
- Location within Australia
- Coordinates: 37°49′06.5″S 144°57′59.8″E

=== Location ===
- Melbourne lies within the following regions:
  - Southern Hemisphere and Eastern Hemisphere
    - Oceania
      - Australasia
        - Australia (continent)
          - Australia (outline)
            - Victoria
- Time zone(s):
  - Australian Eastern Standard Time (UTC+10)
  - In Summer (DST): Australian Eastern Daylight Time (UTC+11)

=== Environment ===
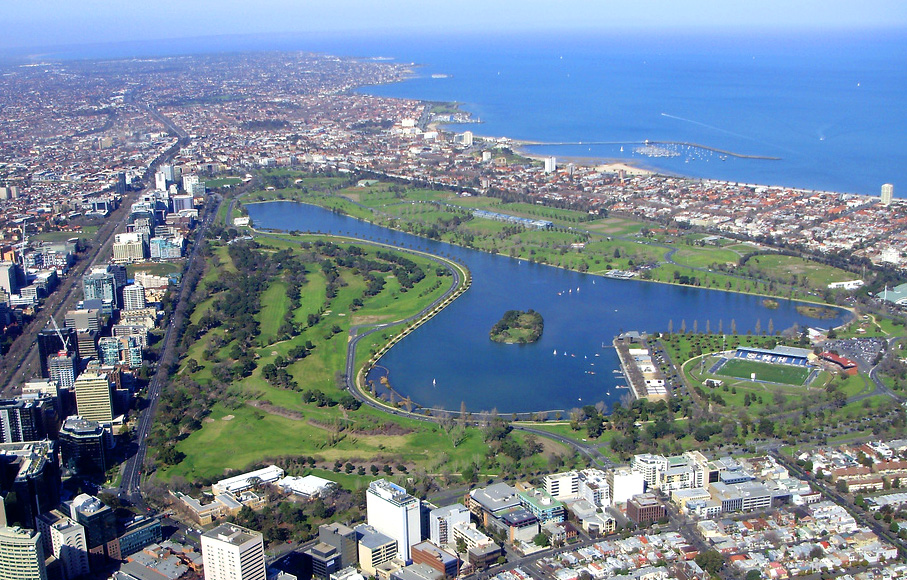
Albert Park Lake

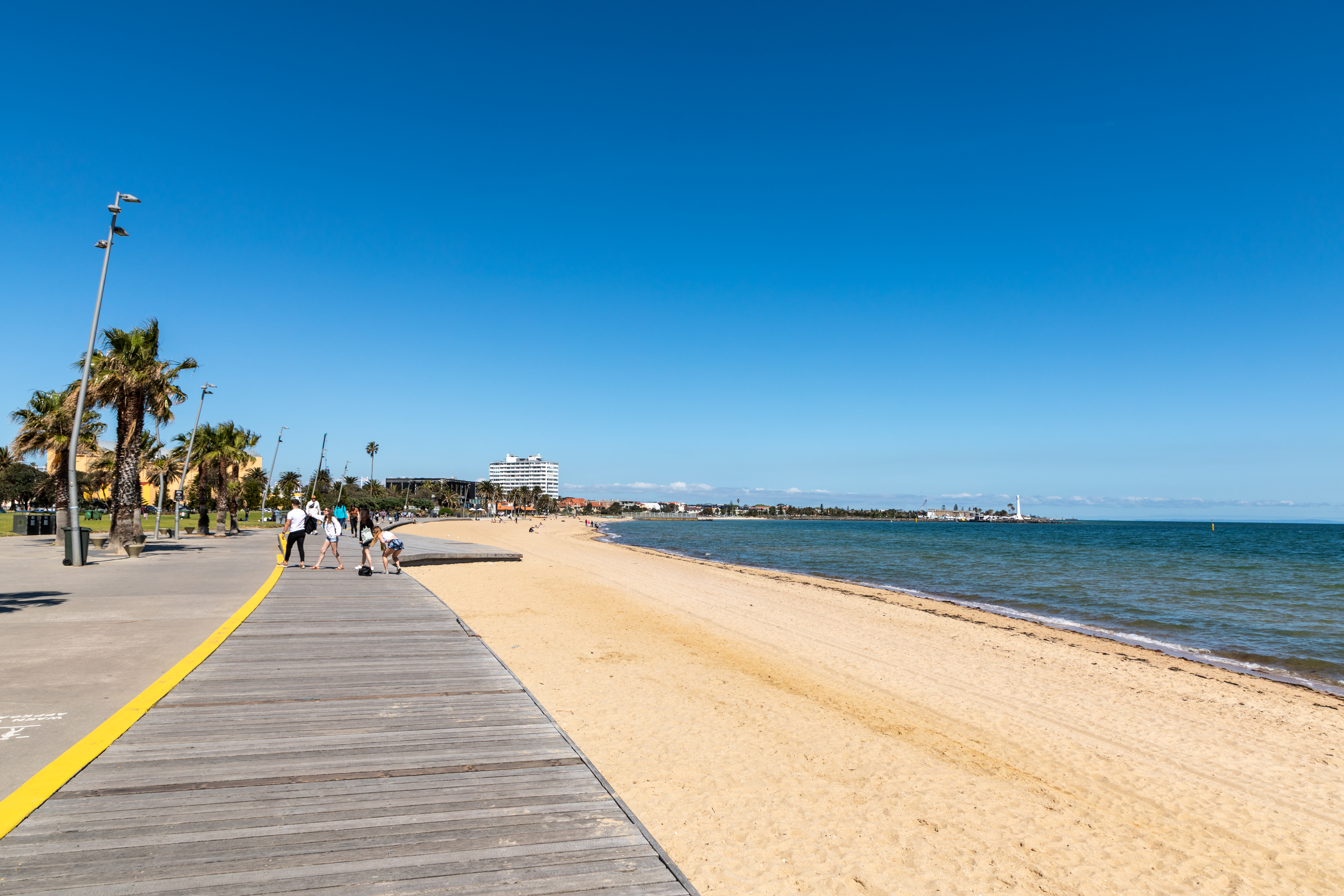
St Kilda Beach

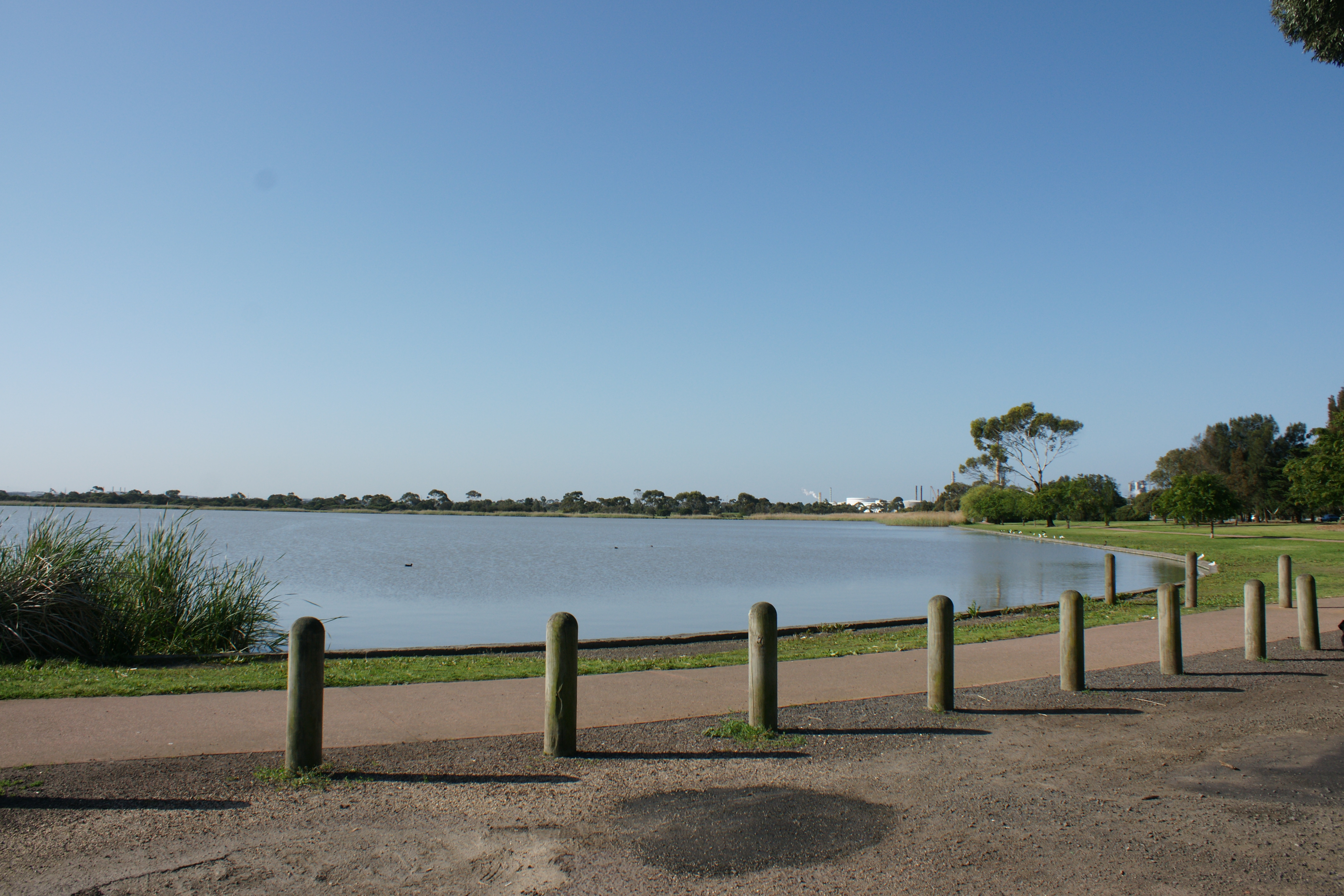
Cherry Lake

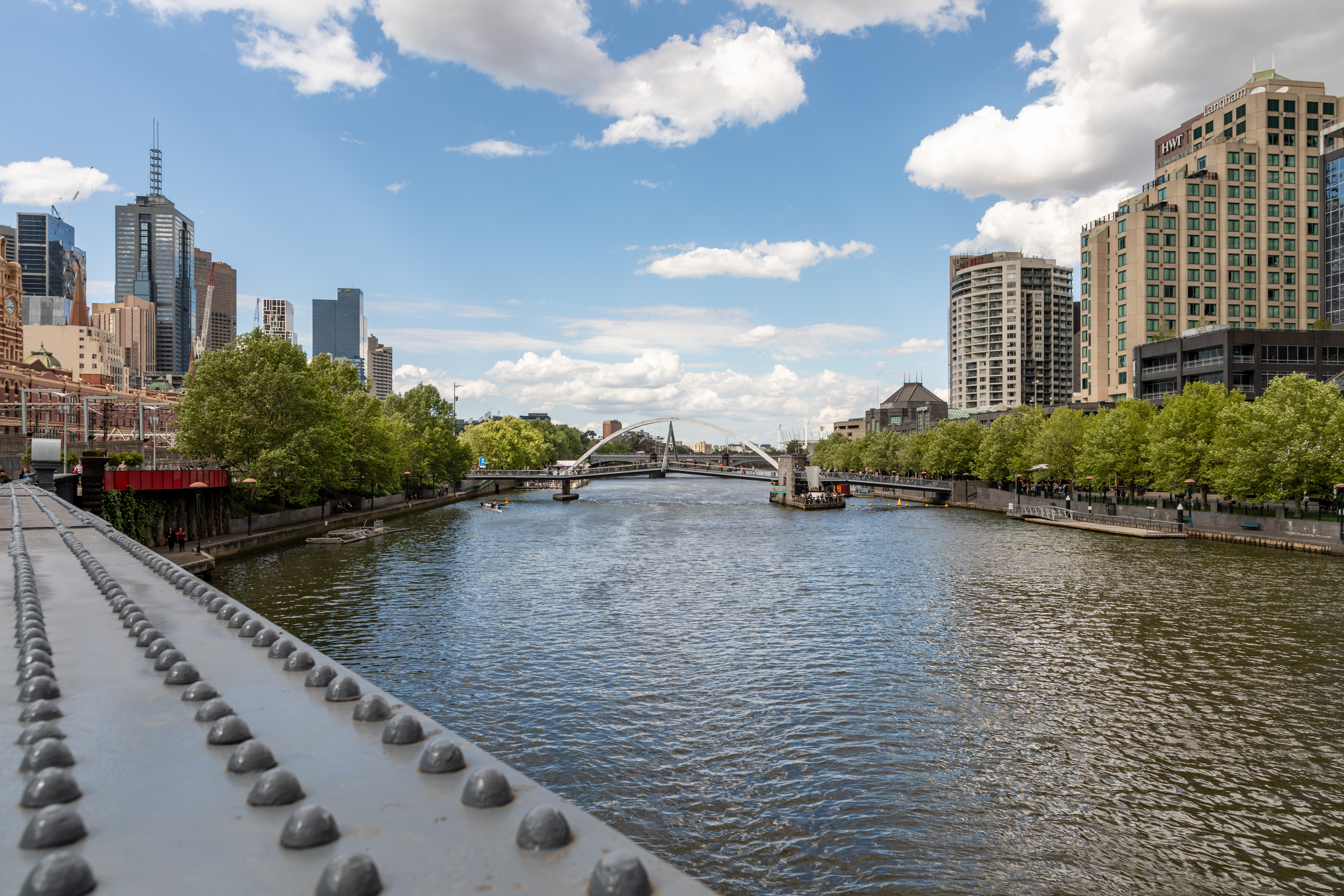
The Yarra River

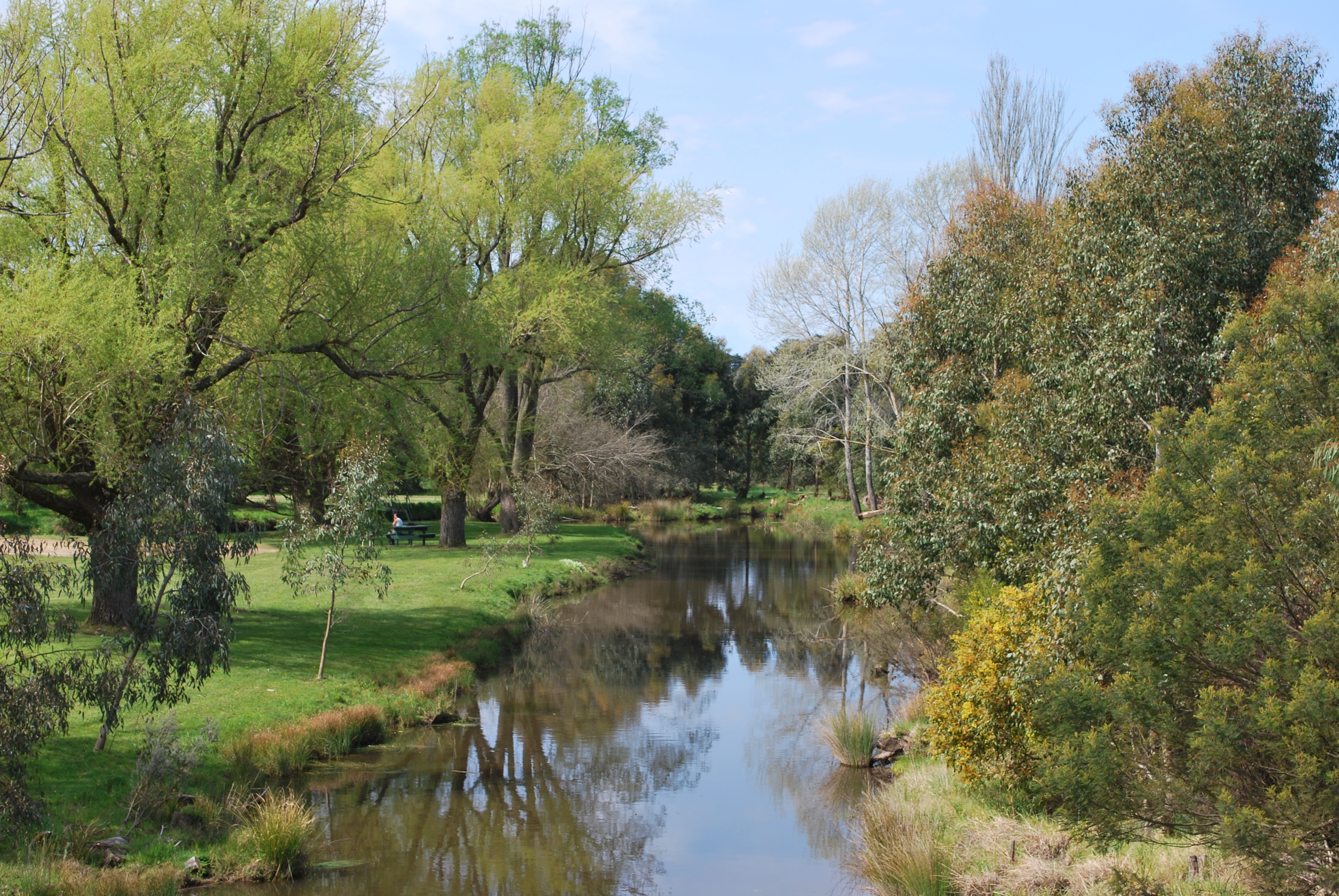
Werribee River

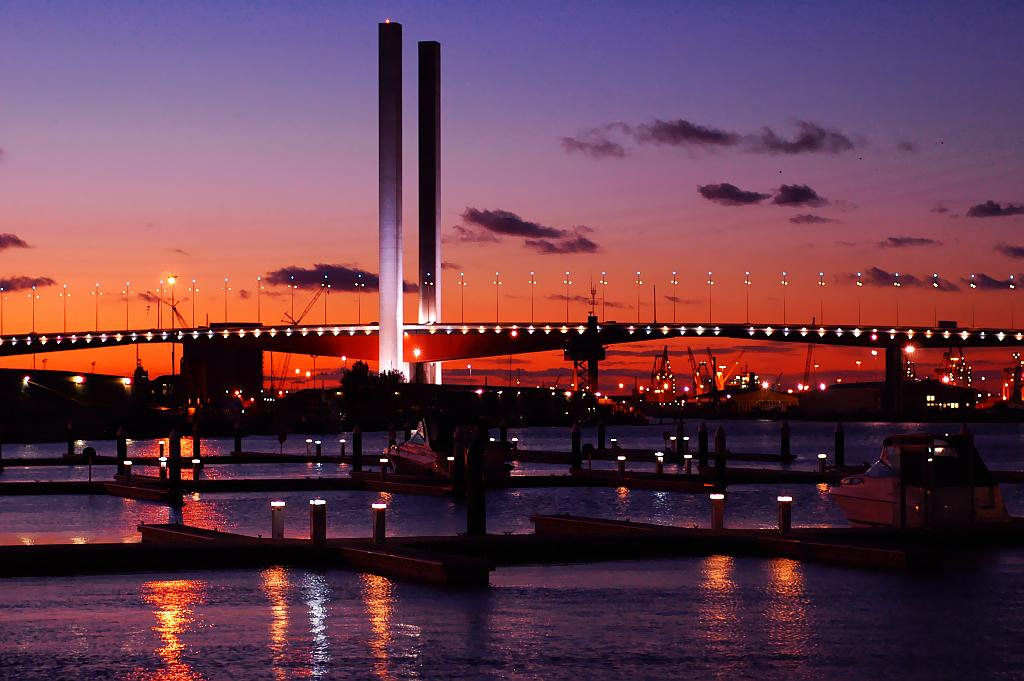
Bolte Bridge

- Climate of Melbourne

==== Natural geographic features ====
- Bays in Melbourne
  - Port Phillip
- Beaches in Melbourne
  - See Beaches in Port Phillip
- Lakes in Melbourne
  - Albert Park Lake
  - Aura Vale Lake
  - Blackburn Lake
  - Braeside Park Wetlands
  - Caribbean Lake
  - Cherry Lake
  - Edithvale Wetlands
  - Jells Lake
  - Karkarook Lake
  - Lilydale Lake
  - Lysterfield Lake
  - Patterson Lakes
  - RAAF Lake
  - Sanctuary Lakes
  - Waterways Lake
- Rivers in Melbourne
  - Bass River
  - Dandenong Creek
  - Maribyrnong River
  - Werribee River
  - Yarra River

=== Areas ===
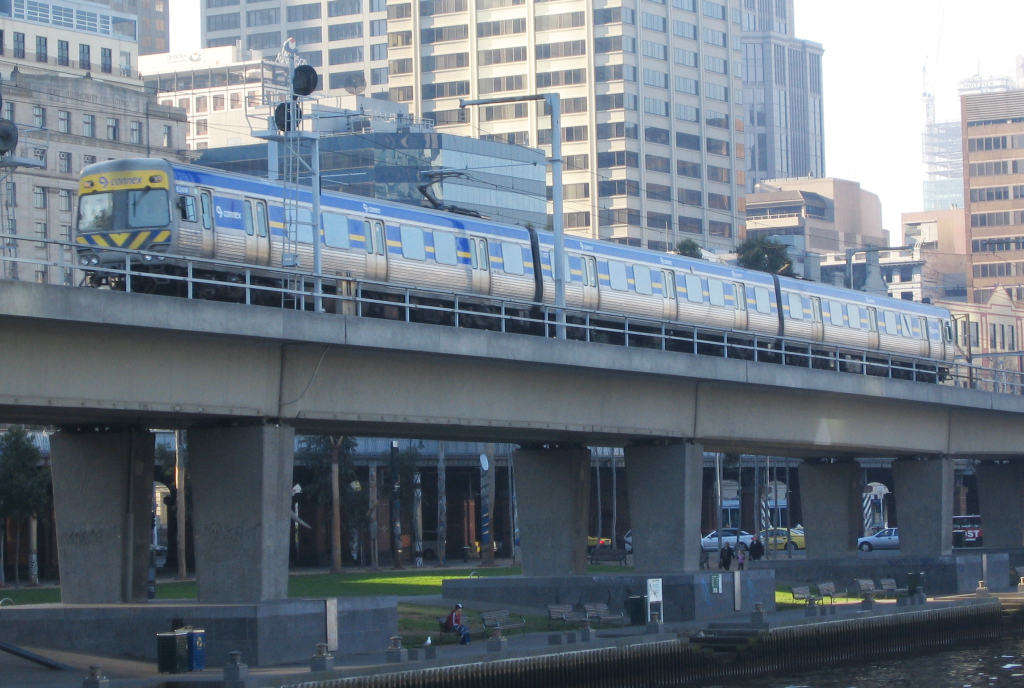
Flinders Street Viaduct

City of Melbourne

Local Government Areas in Melbourne

Suburbs of Melbourne

==== Districts of Melbourne ====
- Melbourne central business district

=== Locations ===
- Tourist attractions in Melbourne
  - Museums in Melbourne
  - Shopping centres in Melbourne

==== Bridges in Melbourne ====
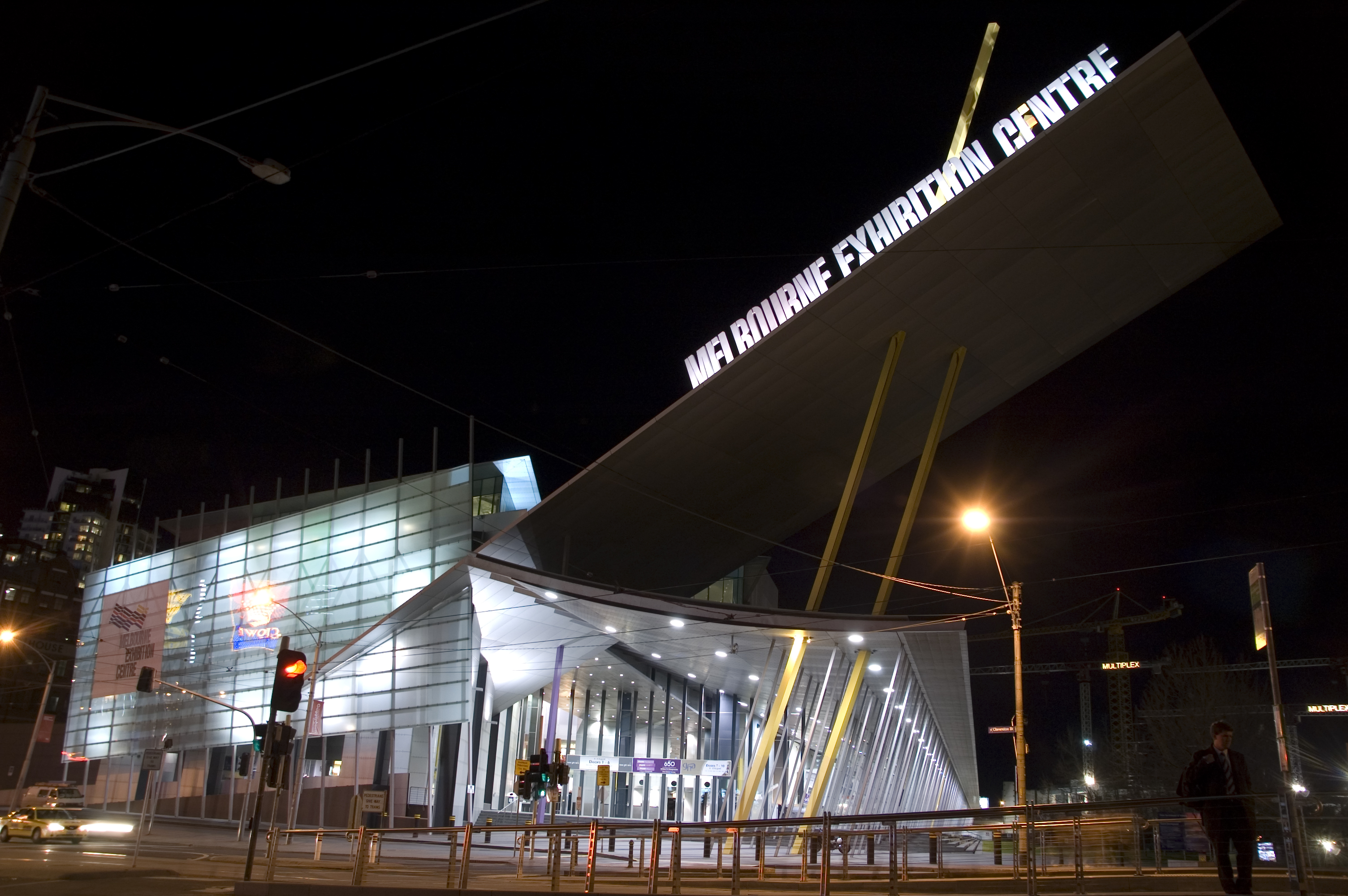
Melbourne Convention & Exhibition Centre

Bridges in Melbourne

- Bolte Bridge
- Charles Grimes Bridge
- Church Street Bridge
- Cremorne Railway Bridge
- Darebin Creek Bridge
- Evan Walker Bridge
- Flinders Street Viaduct
- Hawthorn Bridge
- Hawthorn Railway Bridge
- Hoddle Bridge
- Jim Stynes Bridge
- King Street Bridge
- MacRobertson Bridge
- Maribyrnong River Viaduct
- Montague Street Bridge
- Morell Bridge
- Princes Bridge
- Queens Bridge
- Sandridge Bridge
- Seafarers Bridge
- Spencer Street Bridge
- Swan Street Bridge
- Victoria Bridge
- West Gate Bridge

==== Cultural and exhibition centres ====
- Melbourne Convention and Exhibition Centre
- Royal Exhibition Building

==== Museums and art galleries ====
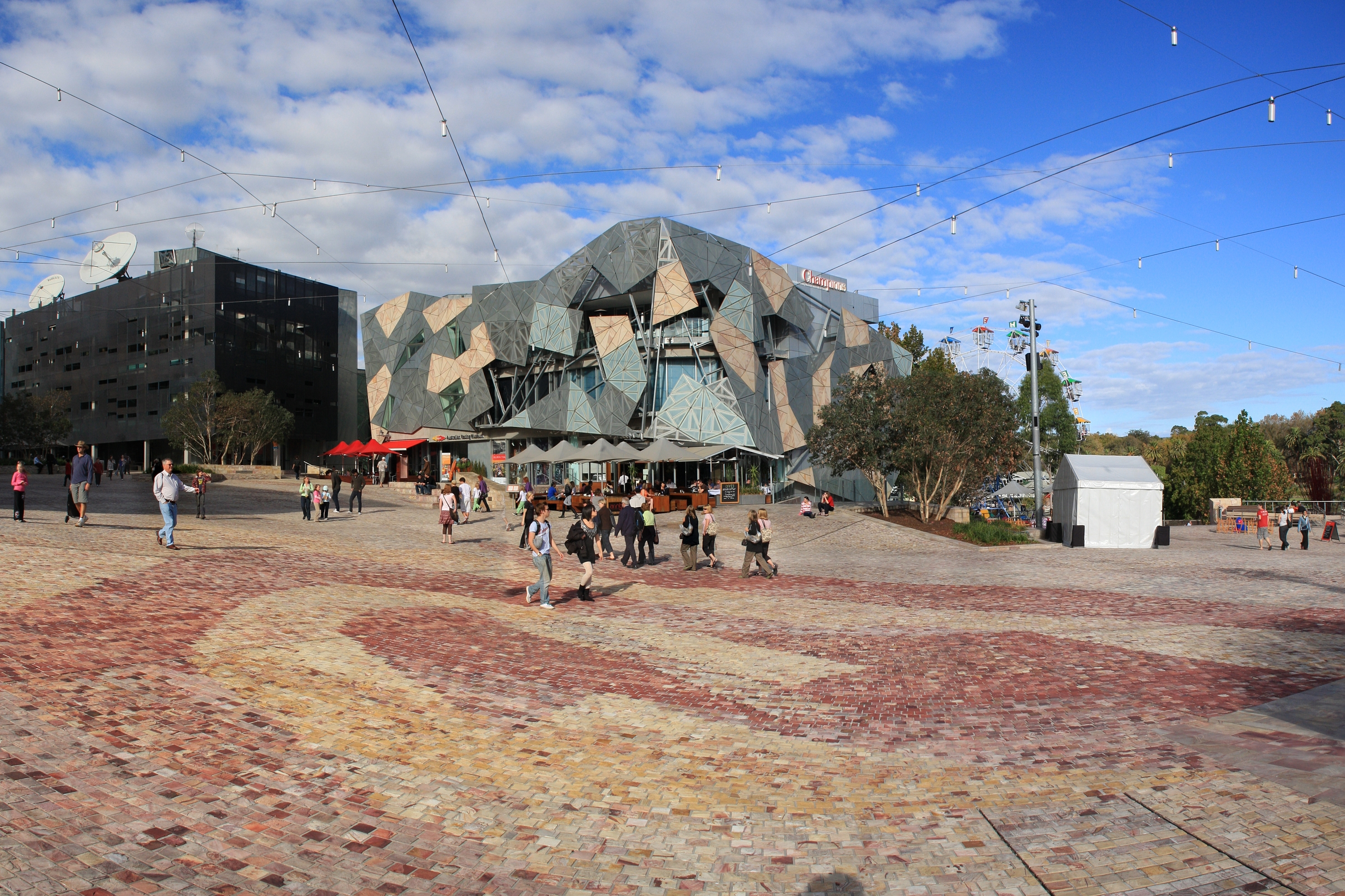
Federation Square

Museums in Melbourne

==== Parks and gardens in Melbourne ====
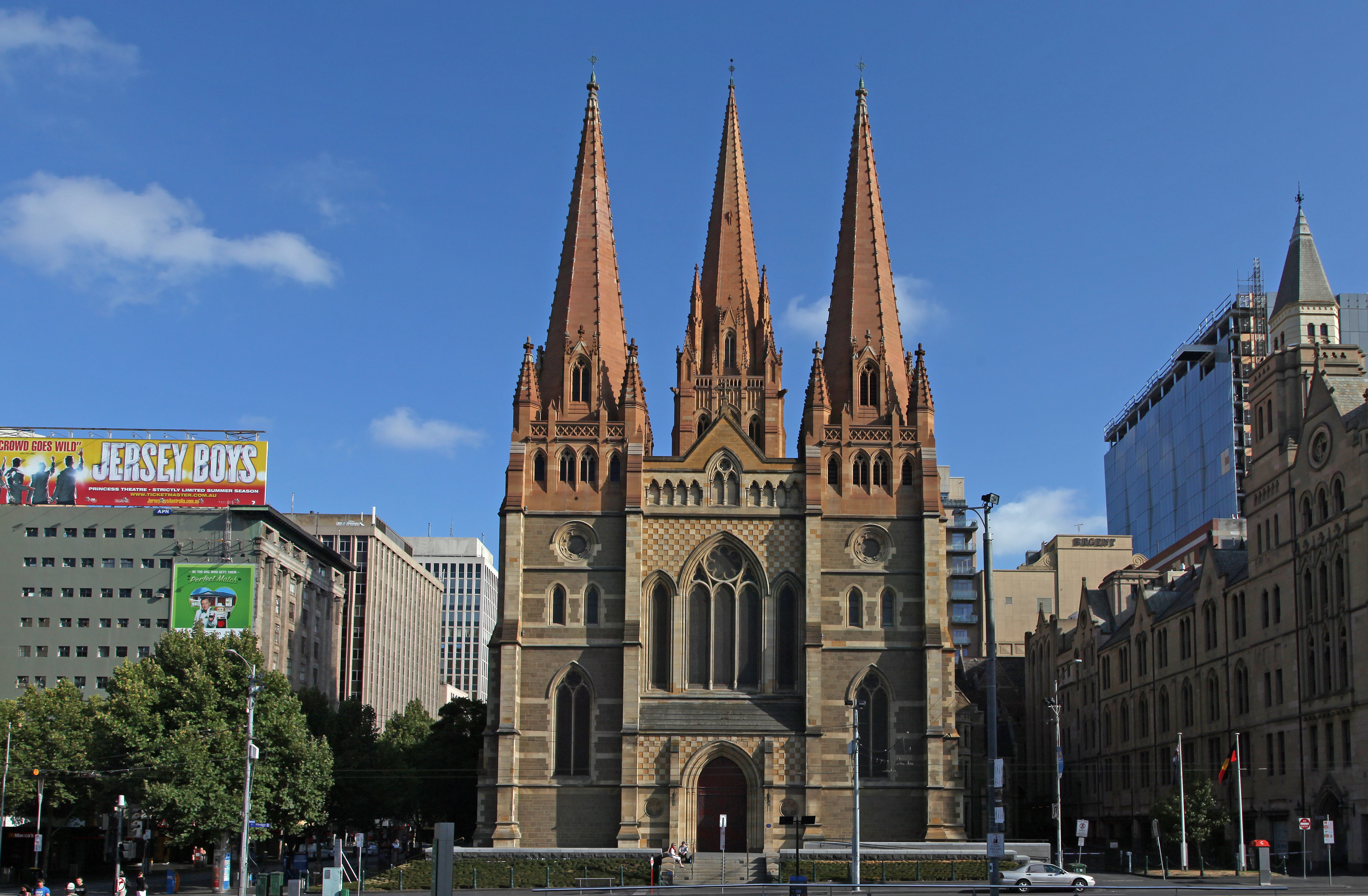
St Paul's Cathedral

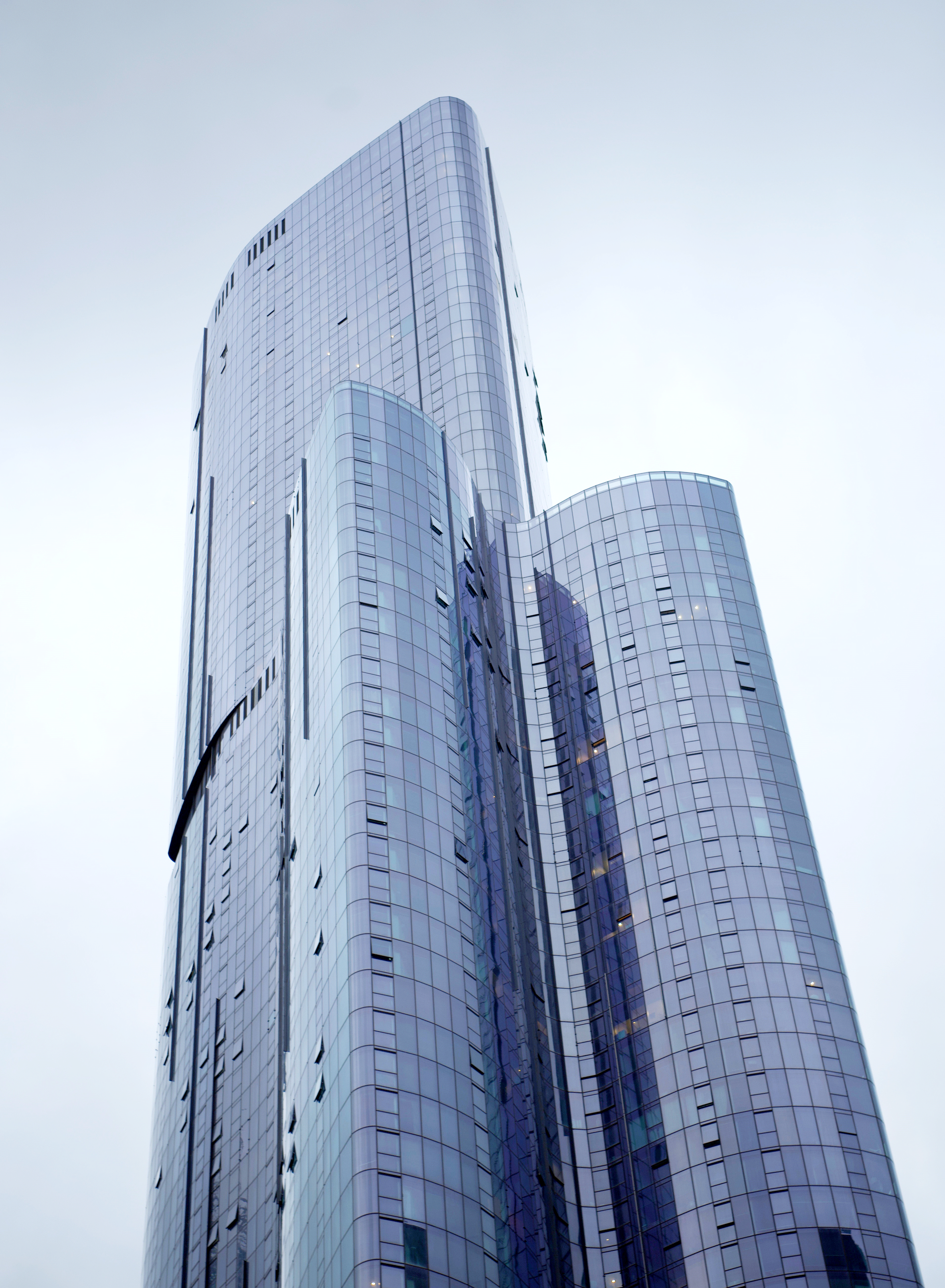
Aurora Melbourne Central

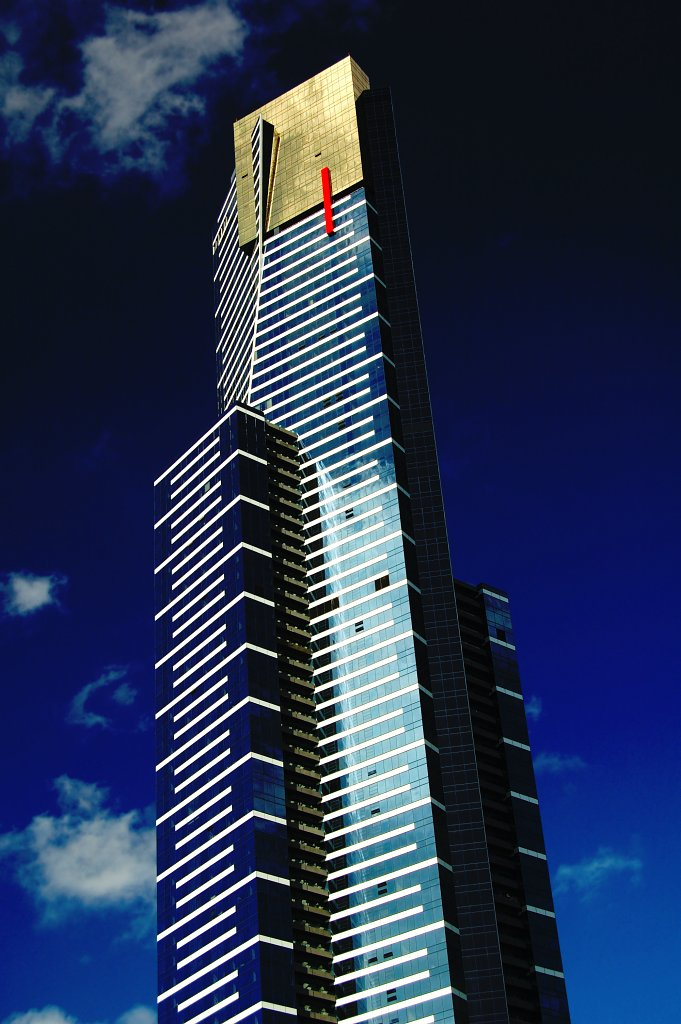
Eureka Tower

Parks in Melbourne

==== Public squares ====
- City Square
- Federation Square

==== Religious buildings ====
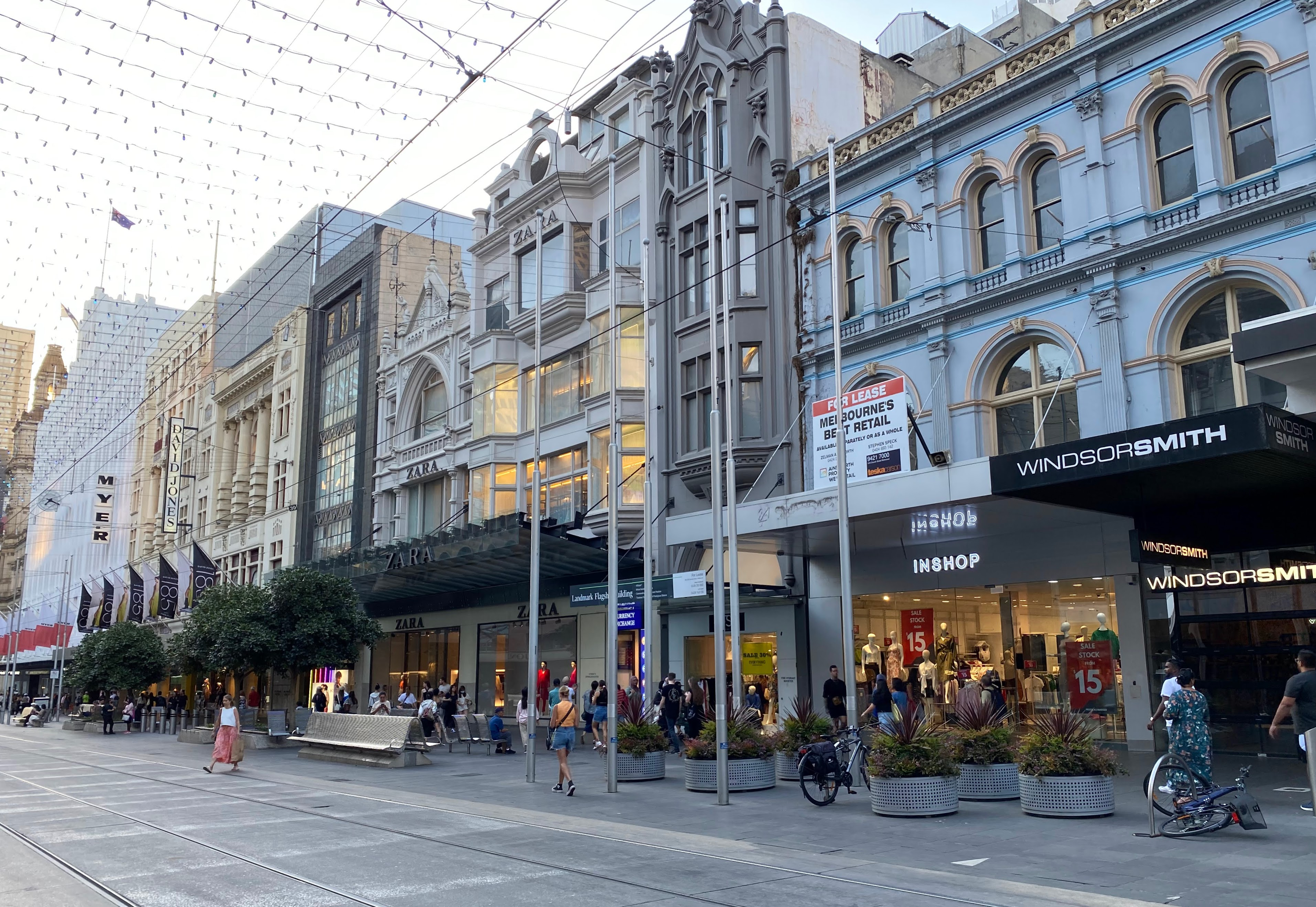
Bourke Street

- Melbourne Welsh Church
- St Francis' Catholic Church
- St James' Old Cathedral
- St Michael's Uniting Church
- St Patrick's Catholic Cathedral
- St Paul's Cathedral
- St Peter's Eastern Hill

==== Skyscrapers (over 200 m) ====
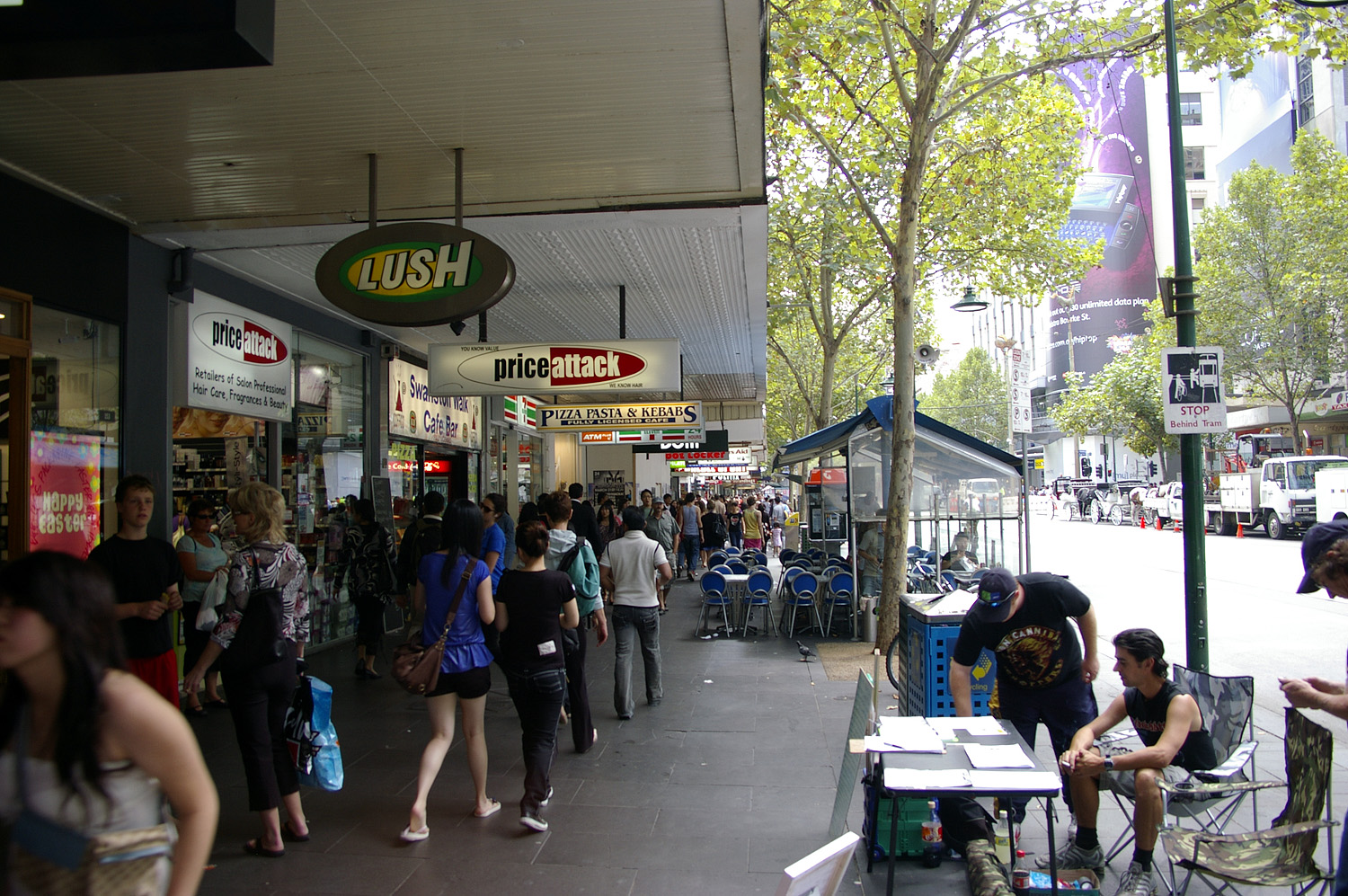
Swanston Street

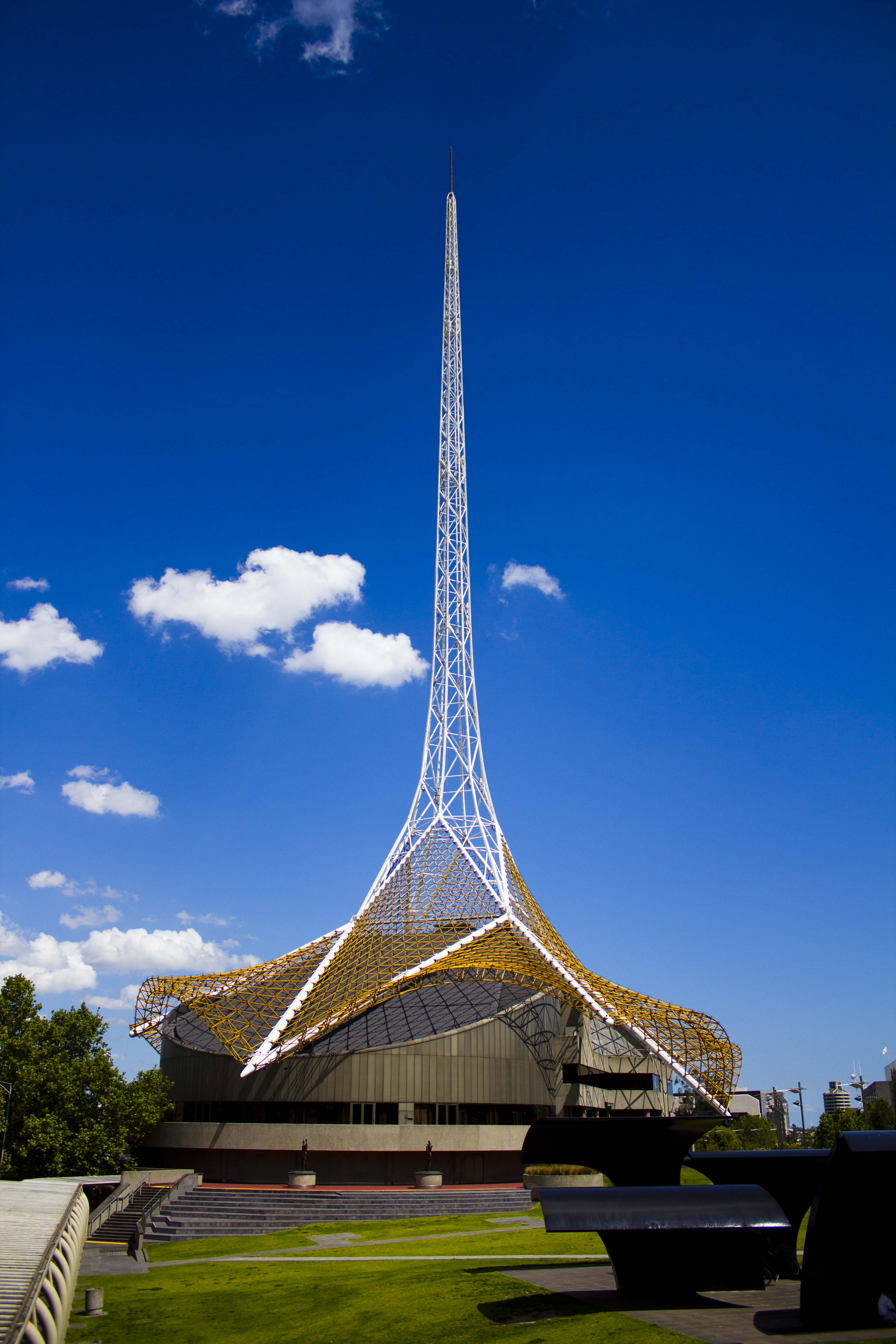
Arts Centre Melbourne

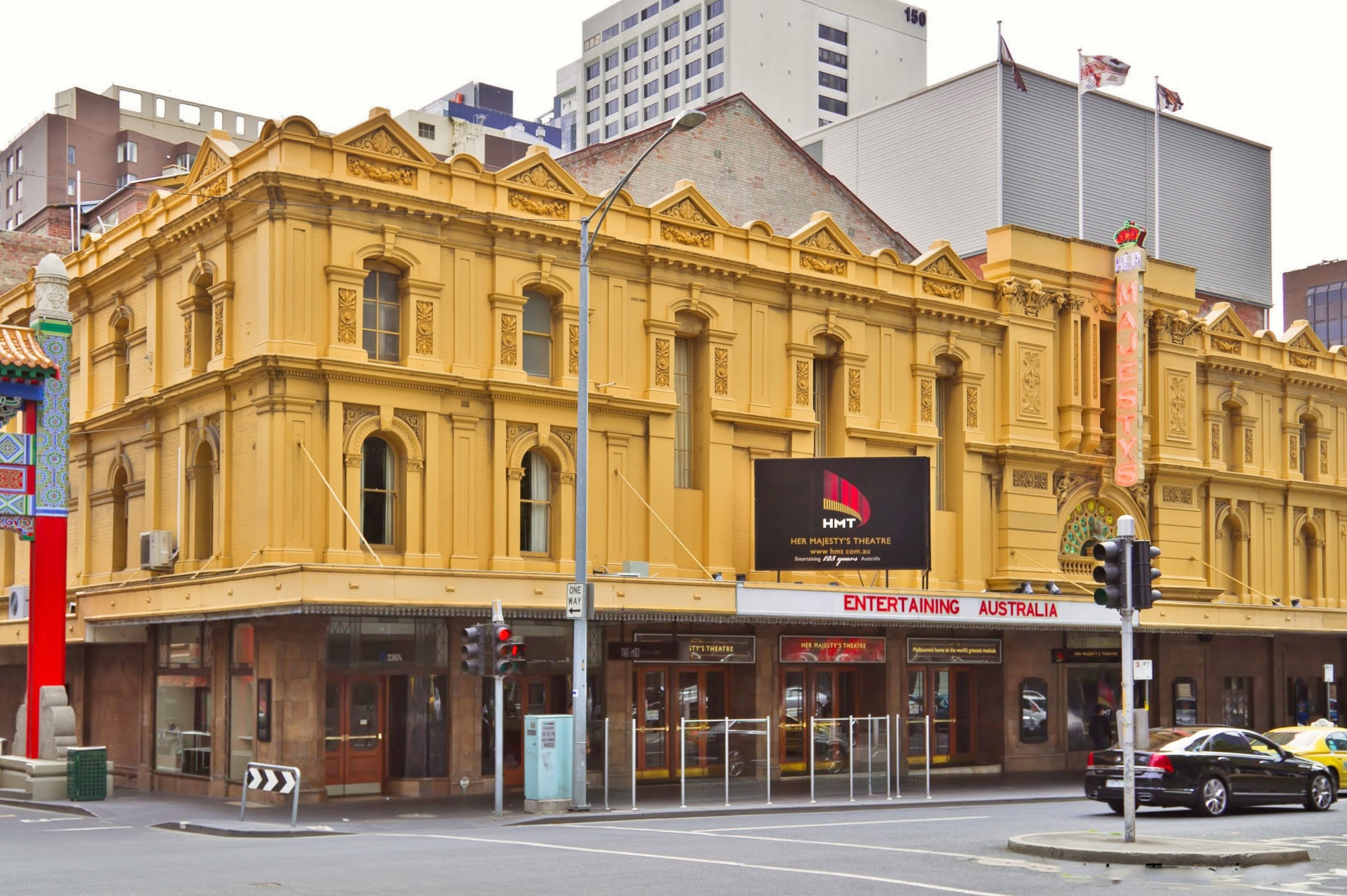
Her Majesty's Theatre

- 101 Collins Street
- 120 Collins Street
- 380 Melbourne
- 568 Collins Street
- Aurora Melbourne Central
- Australia 108
- Bourke Place
- Eq. Tower
- Eureka Tower
- Freshwater Place
- Light House Melbourne
- Melbourne Central
- Melbourne Square Tower 1
- Premier Tower
- Prima Pearl
- Queens Place
- Swanston Central
- Telstra Corporate Centre
- Victoria One
- Vision Apartments
- West Side Place Tower A
- West Side Place Tower B
- West Side Place Tower C
- West Side Place Tower D

==== Streets ====
- Batman Avenue
- Brunswick Street
- Bourke Street
- Chapel Street
- Collins Street
- Elizabeth Street
- Exhibition Street
- Flinders Street
- King Street
- La Trobe Street
- Lonsdale Street
- Lygon Street
- Queen Street
- Russell Street
- Spencer Street
- Spring Street
- Swanston Street
- Victoria Street
- William Street

==== Theatres ====
- Arts Centre Melbourne
- Comedy Theatre
- Forum Theatre
- Her Majesty's Theatre
- La Mama
- Melbourne Recital Centre
- Palais Theatre
- Princess Theatre
- Regent Theatre
- Southbank Theatre
- The Athenaeum

=== Demographics ===
Demographics of Melbourne

== Government and politics ==
Government and politics of Melbourne

- Division of Melbourne
- Mayors and Lord Mayors of Melbourne
- International relations of Melbourne
  - Osaka, Japan (1978)
  - Tianjin, China (1980)
  - Thessaloniki, Greece (1984)
  - Boston, United States (1985)
  - Milan, Italy (2004)

=== Law and order ===
- Crime in Melbourne
  - Major Crimes
    - 2017 Brighton siege
    - 2018 Melbourne stabbing attack
    - December 2017 Melbourne car attack
    - Endeavour Hills stabbings
    - Hoddle Street massacre
    - January 2017 Melbourne car attack
    - Melbourne gangland killings
    - Monash University shooting
    - Queen Street massacre
    - Russel Street bombing
    - Walsh Street police shootings
  - Major Criminal Figures
    - Apex gang
    - Dimitious Gargasoulas
    - John Wren
    - Mark Read
    - Squizzy Taylor
    - The Pettingill family

== History ==
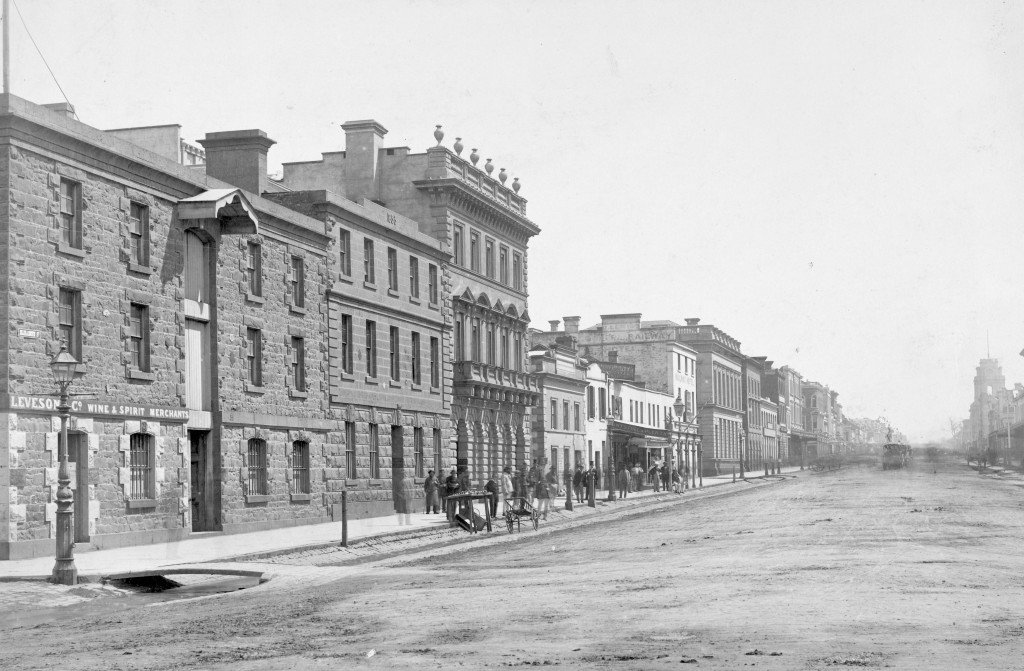
Elizabeth Street in 1870

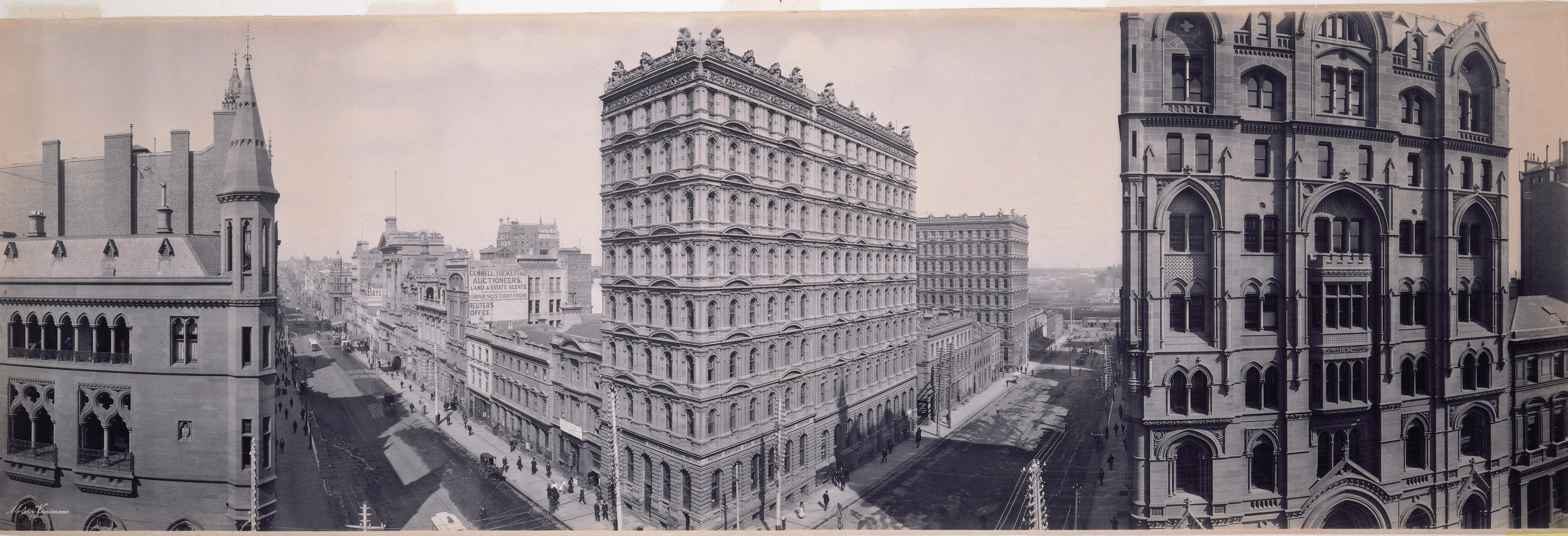
Collins and Queen Streets, 1903

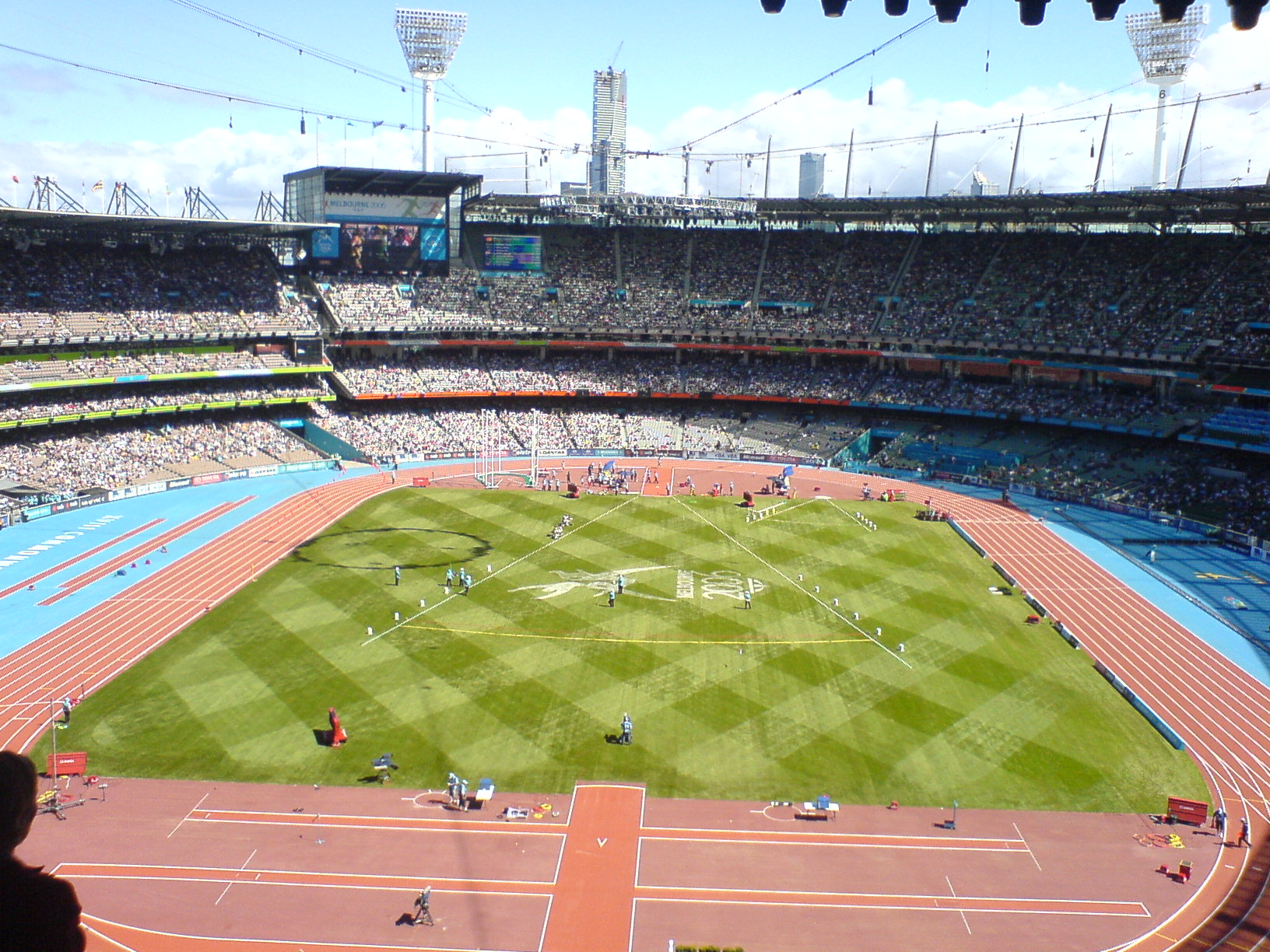
Melbourne Cricket Ground during the 2006 Commonwealth Games

=== History ===
Timeline of Melbourne history

- Early History
- Arrival of the penal colony

1800s

- Foundation of Melbourne
- Early colonisation and displacement
- 1850s gold rush
- 1880s and 1890s expansion

1900s

- "Australia's capital": 1901–1927
- Interwar period
- 1934 Centenary of Melbourne
- World War II
- Post World War II

2000s

- Melbourne in the 21st century
- COVID-19 pandemic in Melbourne

== Culture of Melbourne ==
Culture of Melbourne

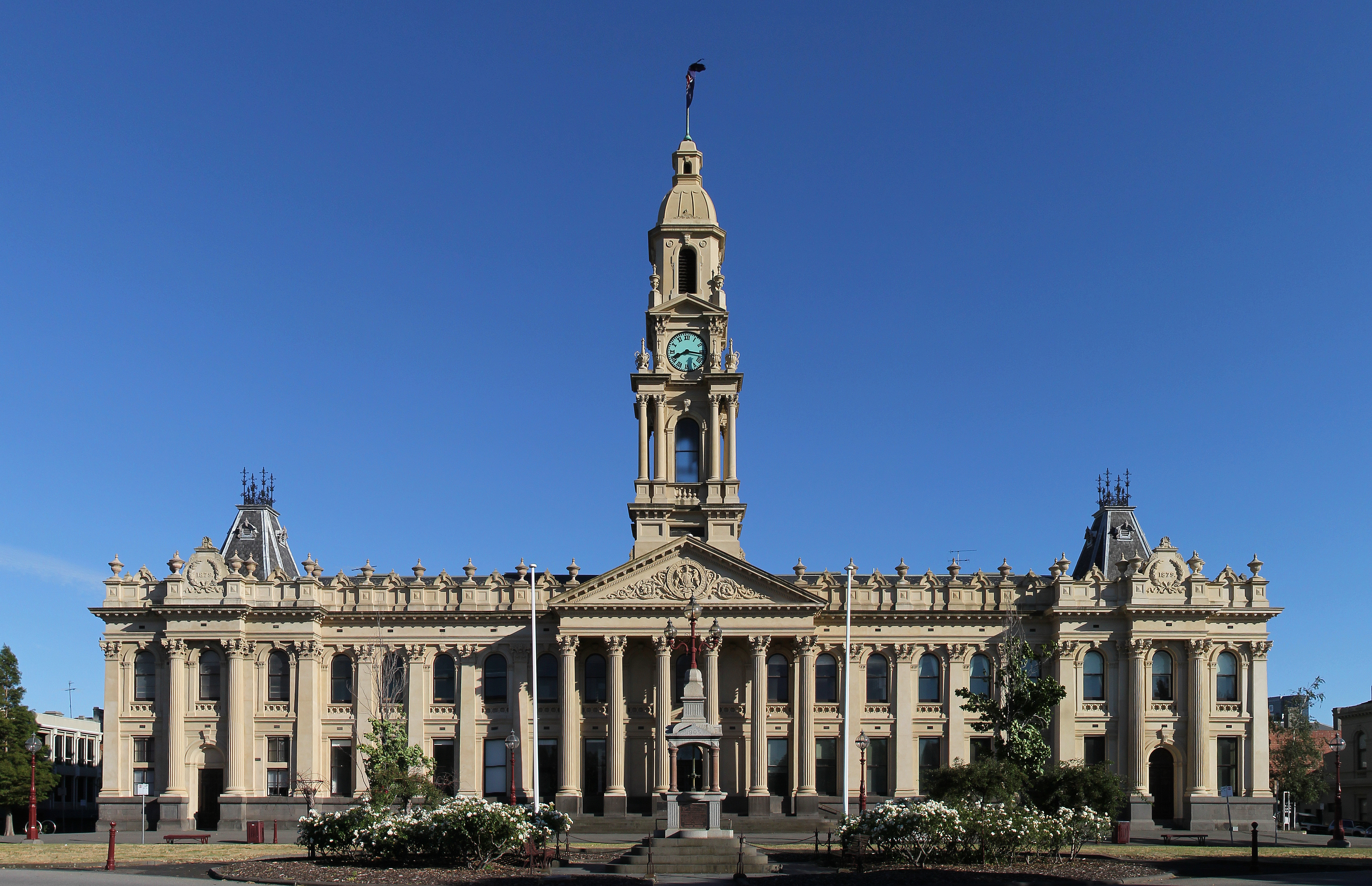
South Melbourne Town Hall

=== Arts ===
==== Architecture ====
Architecture of Melbourne

- Arcades and laneways
- Bridges in Melbourne
- Tallest buildings in Melbourne
- Town halls and civic centres

==== Cinema ====
- Docklands Studios
- List of films shot in Melbourne
- Melbourne Film Festivals
  - Melbourne International Animation Festival
  - Melbourne International Film Festival
  - Melbourne Queer Film Festival
  - Melbourne Underground Film Festival

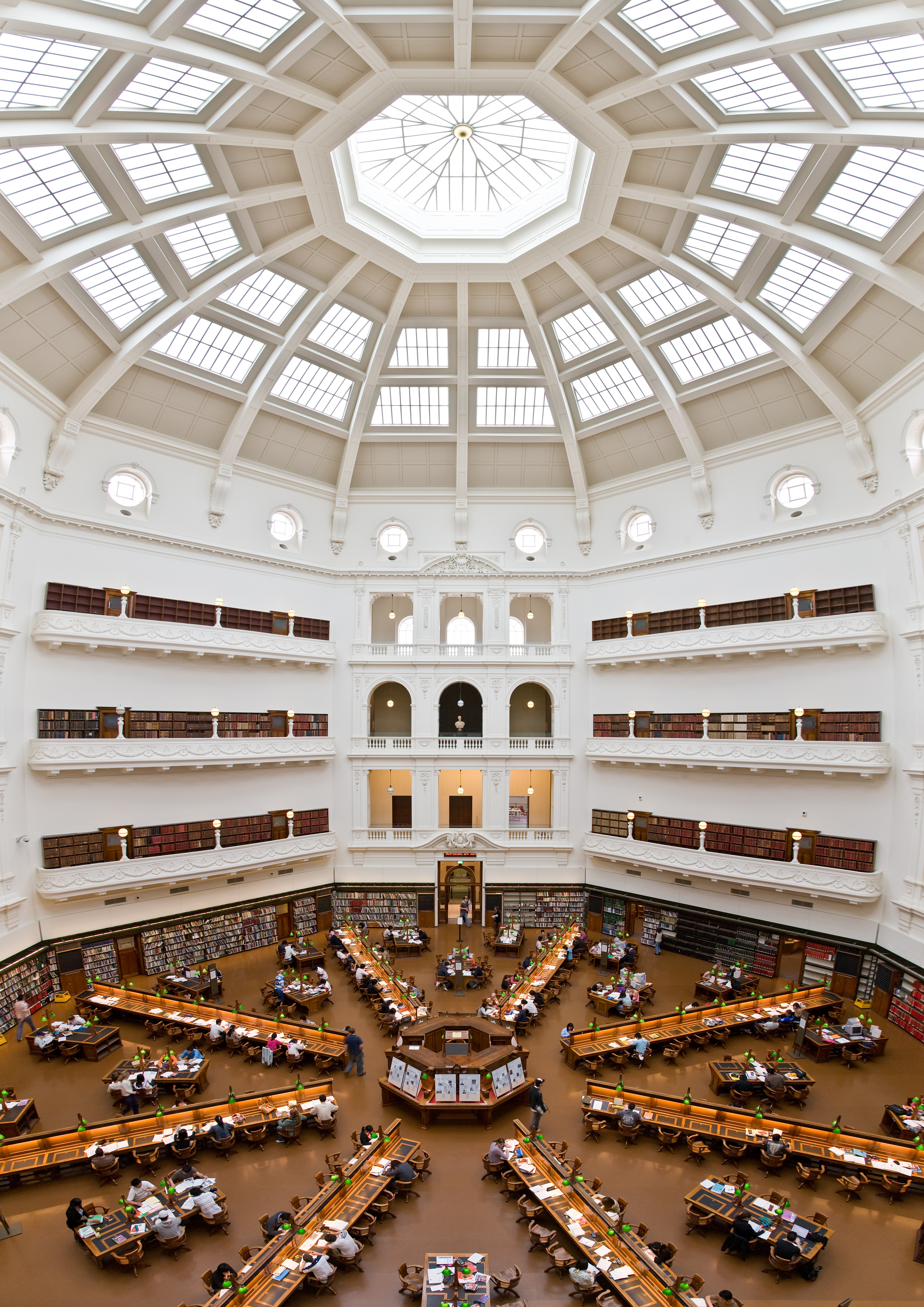
State Library of Victoria

==== Literature ====
- Libraries in Melbourne
- Melbourne Writers' Festival
- State Library of Victoria

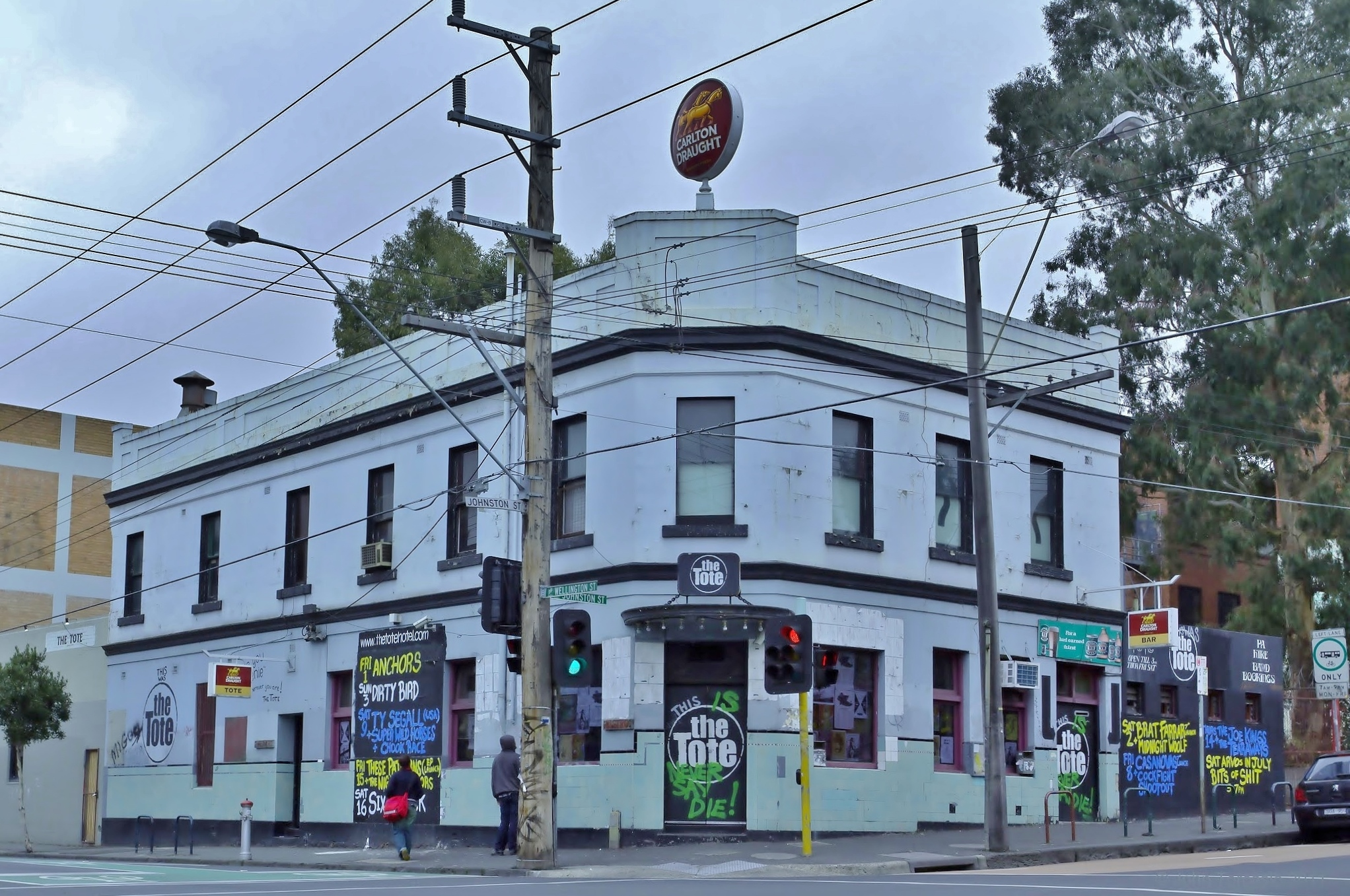
The Tote Hotel

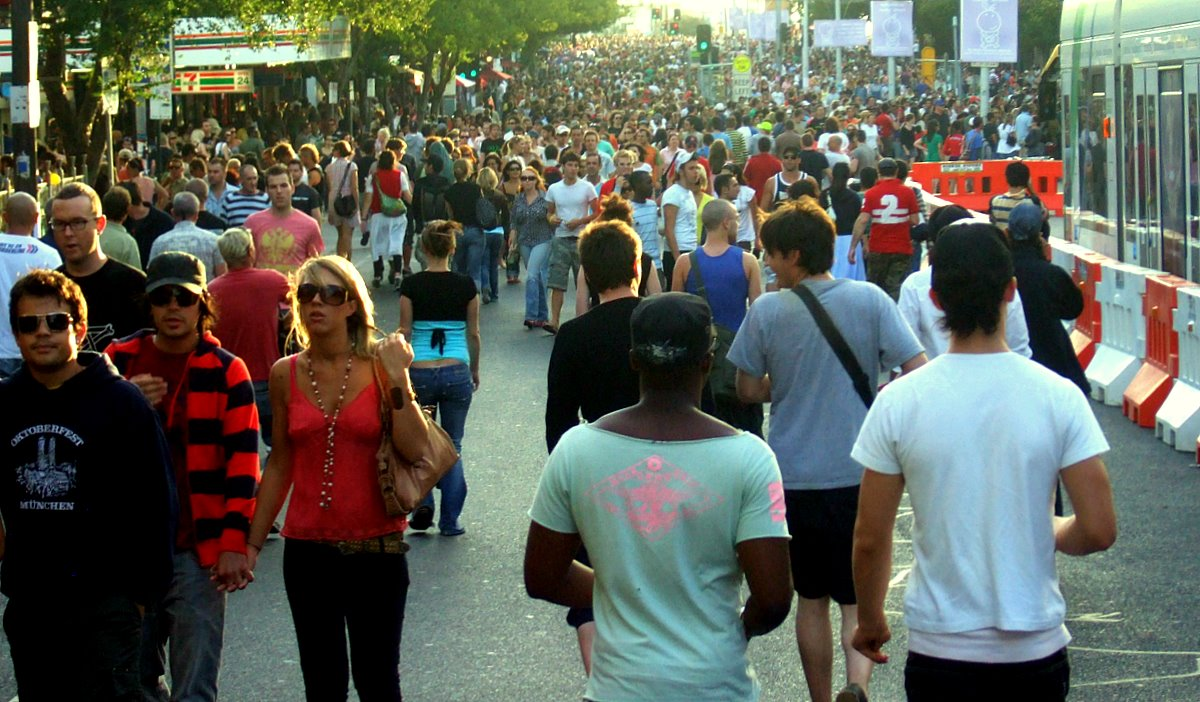
St Kilda Festival

==== Music ====
Music of Melbourne

- List of songs about Melbourne
- Music festivals in Melbourne
  - Big Day Out Music Festival
  - Melbourne Jazz Festival
  - St Kilda Festival
- Music venues in Melbourne
  - Abbotsford Convent
  - Arts Centre Melbourne
  - Bennetts Lane Jazz Club
  - Cherry Bar
  - Corner Hotel
  - Docklands Stadium
  - Empress Hotel
  - Esplanade Hotel
  - Forum Theatre
  - John Cain Arena
  - Margaret Court Arena
  - MCG
  - Palais Theatre
  - Rod Laver Arena
  - Sidney Myer Music Bowl
  - The Old Bar
  - The Tote Hotel

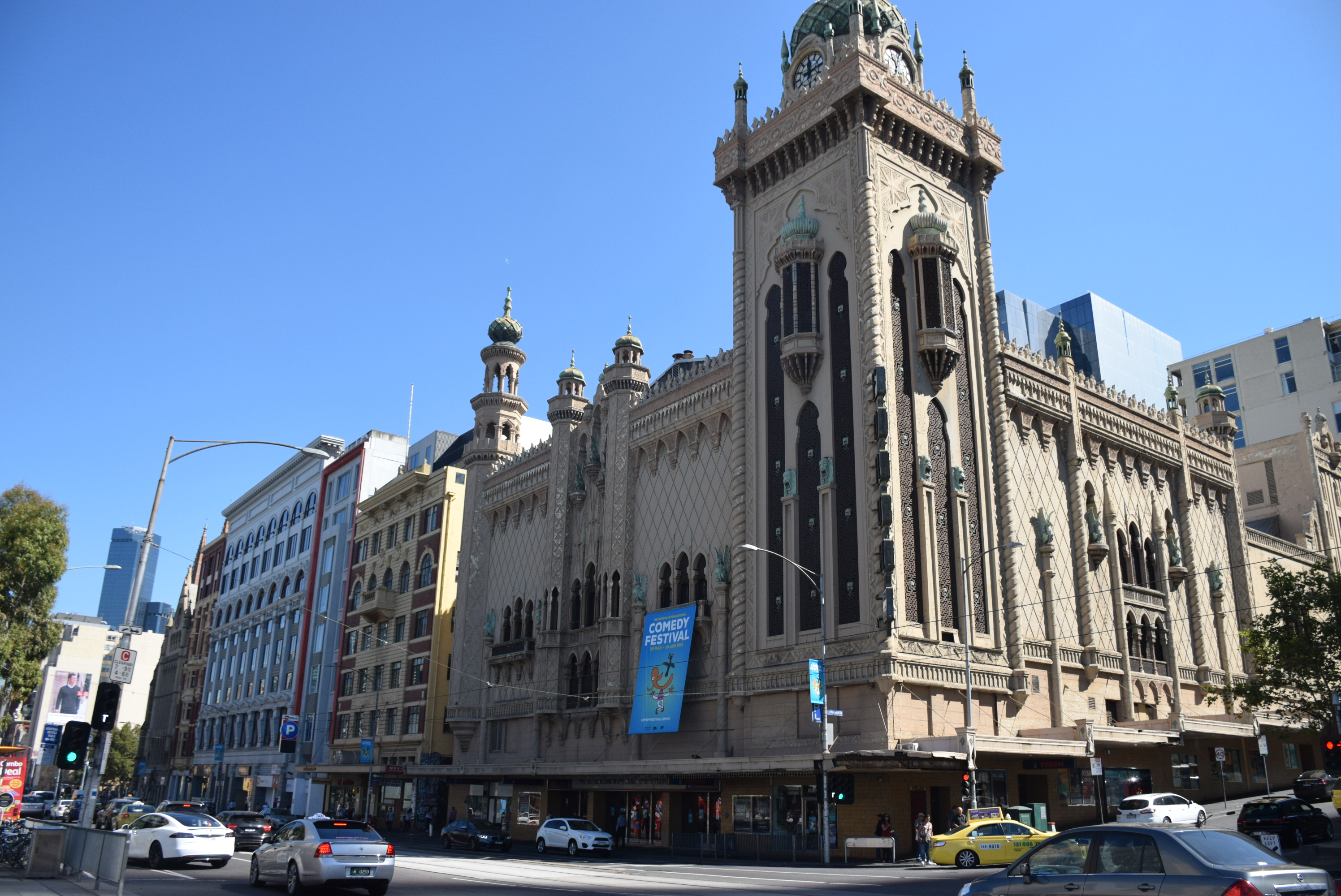
Forum Theatre

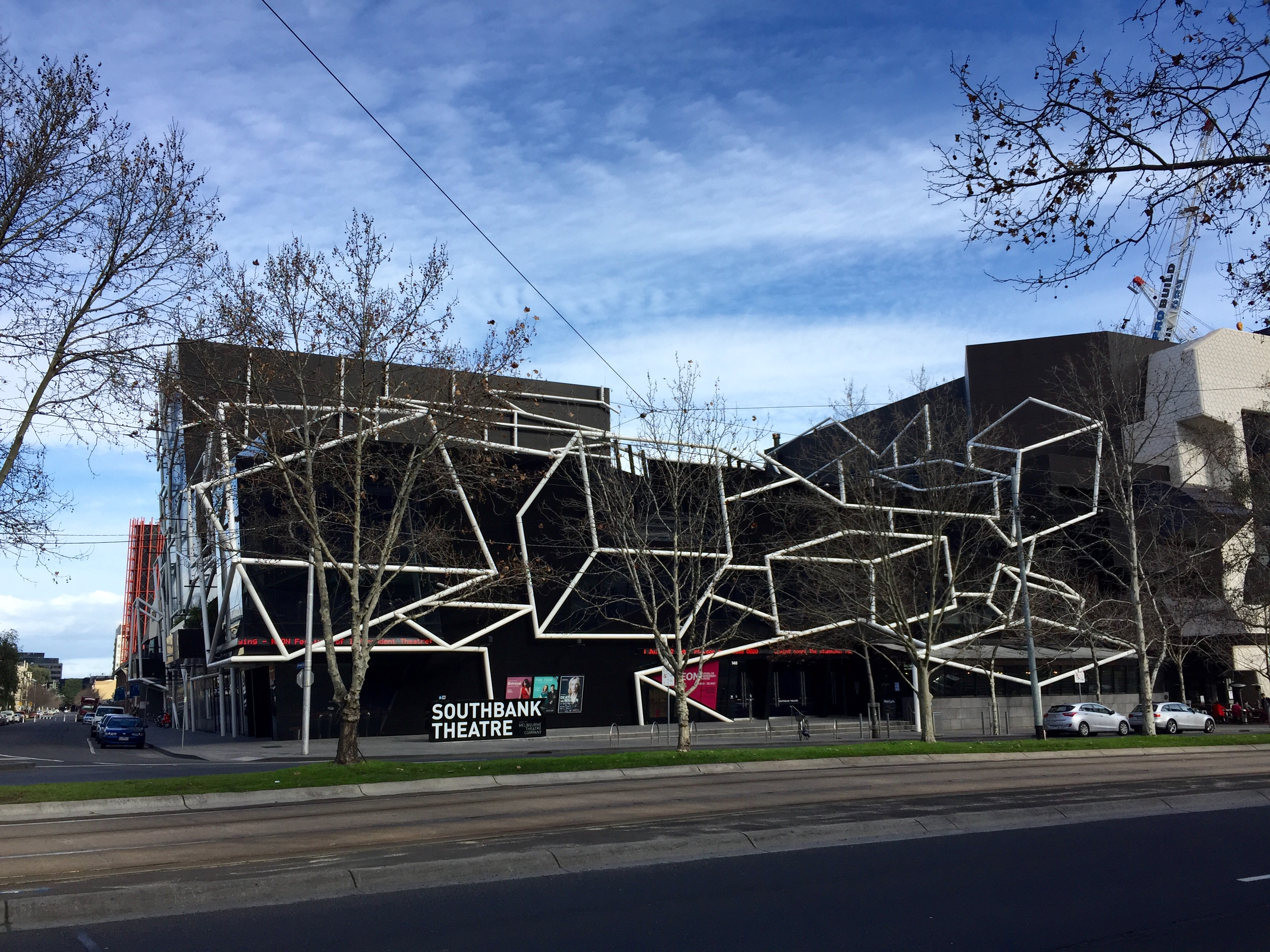
Southbank Theatre

==== Opera and theatre ====
- Ballet in Melbourne
  - Australian Ballet Company
- East End Theatre District
- List of theatres in Melbourne
  - Arts Centre Melbourne
  - Comedy Theatre
  - Forum Theatre
  - Her Majesty's Theatre
  - La Mama
  - Melbourne Recital Centre
  - Palais Theatre
  - Princess Theatre
  - Regent Theatre
  - Southbank Theatre
  - The Athenaeum
- Melbourne Symphony Orchestra
- Melbourne Theatre Company
- Victorian Opera

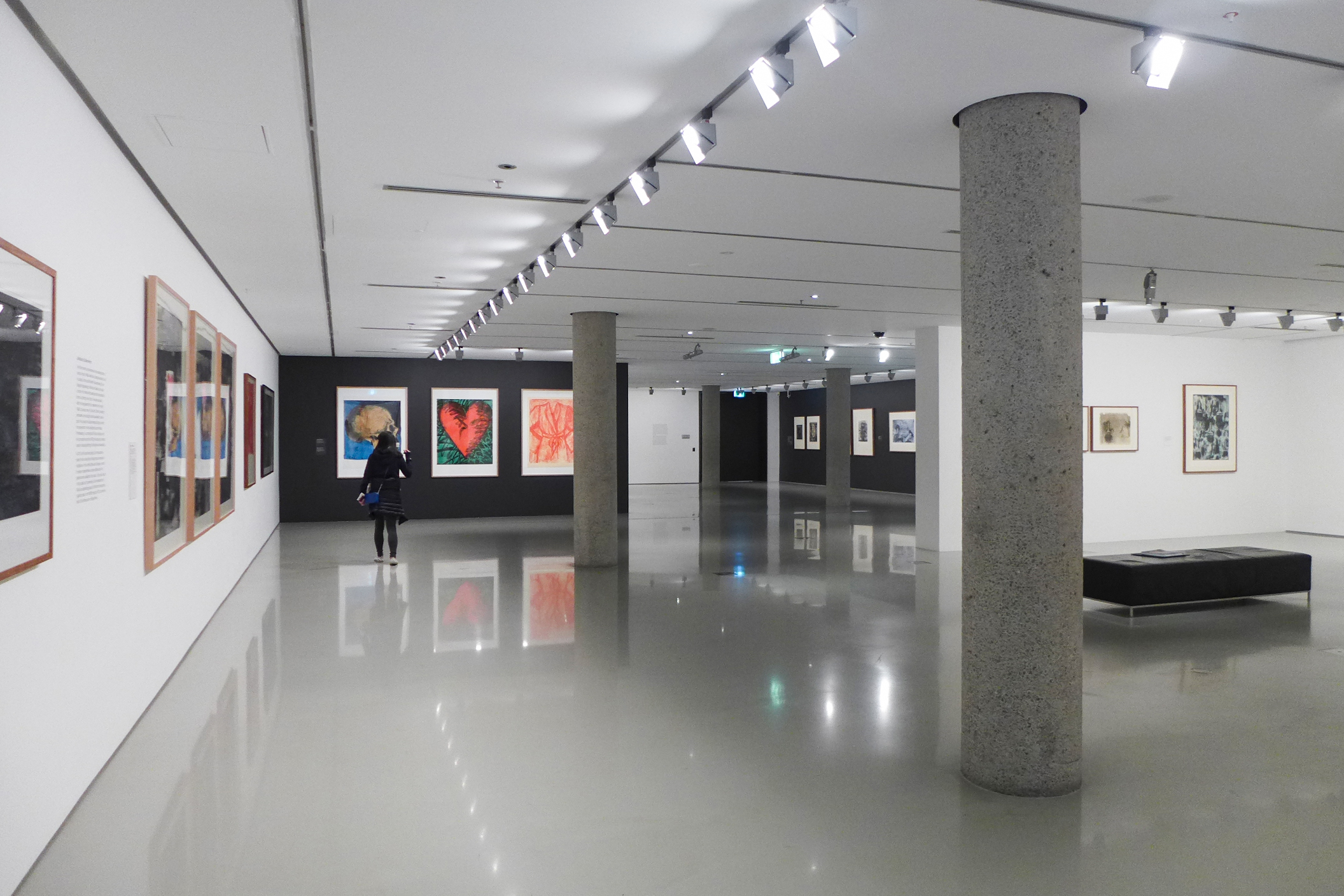
National Gallery of Victoria

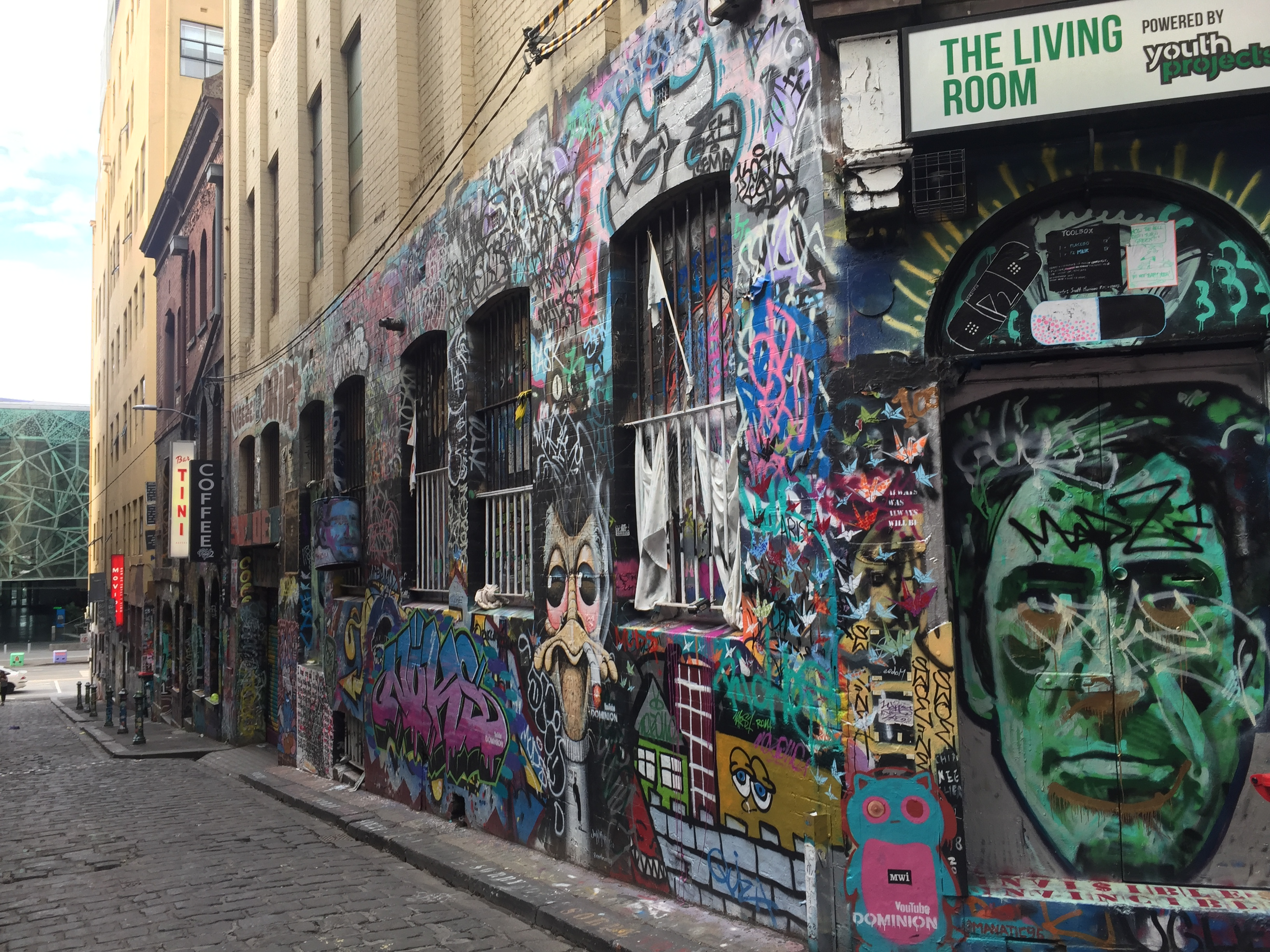
Hosier Lane

==== Visual arts ====
- Galleries
  - Australian Centre for Contemporary Art
  - Australian Centre for the Moving Image
  - Heide Museum of Modern Art
  - Ian Potter Centre
  - National Gallery of Victoria
- Heidelberg School
- Melbourne Fashion Festival
- Melbourne International Arts Festival
- Street art in Melbourne
  - Hosier Lane
  - Melbourne Stencil Festival
  - Notable Melbourne street artists

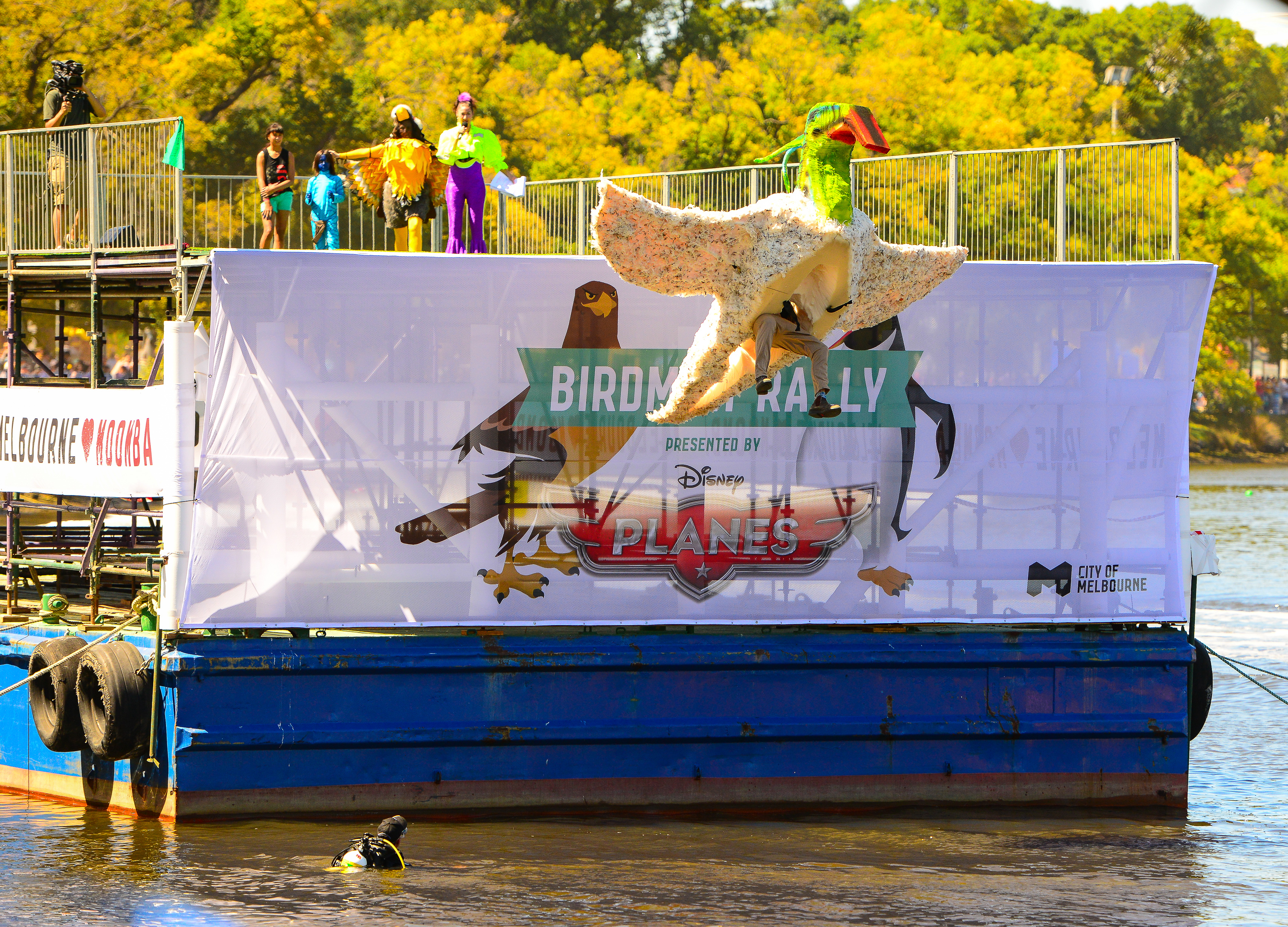
Moomba Birdman Rally, a popular event that takes place during the festival.

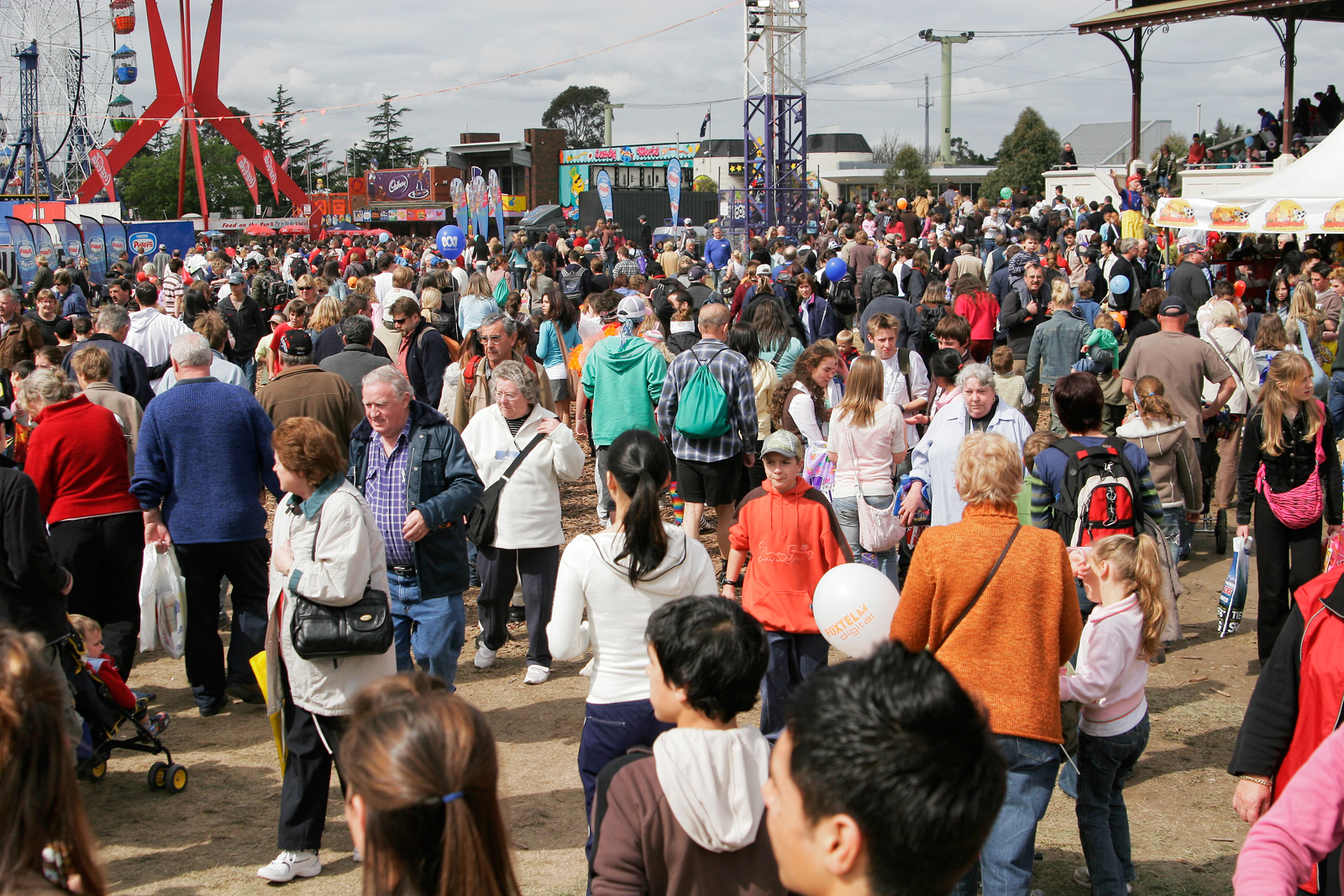
Royal Melbourne Show

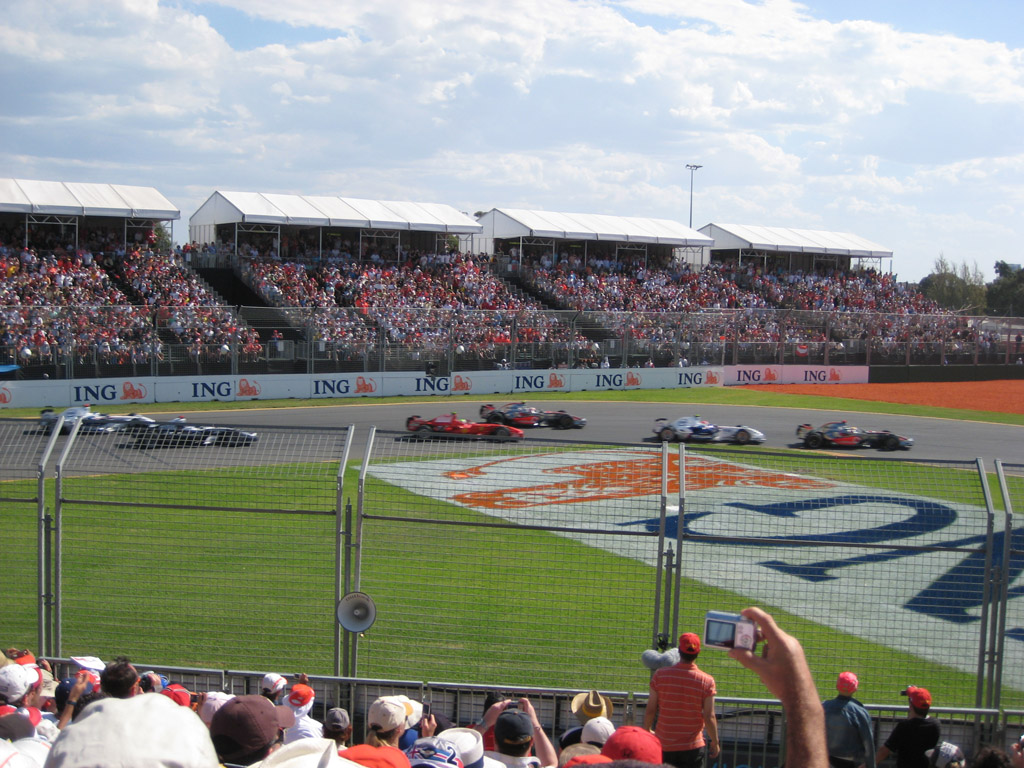
Australian Grand Prix

=== Events and festivals ===
Events and festivals in Melbourne

- Film festivals
  - Melbourne International Animation Festival
  - Melbourne International Film Festival
  - Melbourne Queer Film Festival
  - Melbourne Underground Film Festival
- Melbourne Food and Wine Festival
- Melbourne Fringe Festival
- Melbourne International Comedy Festival
- Melbourne International Flower and Garden Show
- Midsumma
- Moomba
- Music Festivals in Melbourne
  - Big Day Out Music Festival
  - Melbourne Jazz Festival
  - St Kilda Festival
- Open House Melbourne
- Royal Melbourne Show
- Sport events in Melbourne
  - AFL Grand Final
  - Anzac Day match
  - Australian Grand Prix
  - Boxing Day Test
  - Melbourne Cup
  - Spring Racing Carnival

=== Media ===
Media in Melbourne

- Newspapers in Melbourne
  - Herald Sun
  - Il Globo
  - Leader Community Newspaper Group
  - Melbourne Observer
  - Sameway Magazine
  - The Age
  - The Australian Jewish News
  - Vision China Times
- Television in Melbourne
- Radio in Melbourne

=== People ===
People from Melbourne

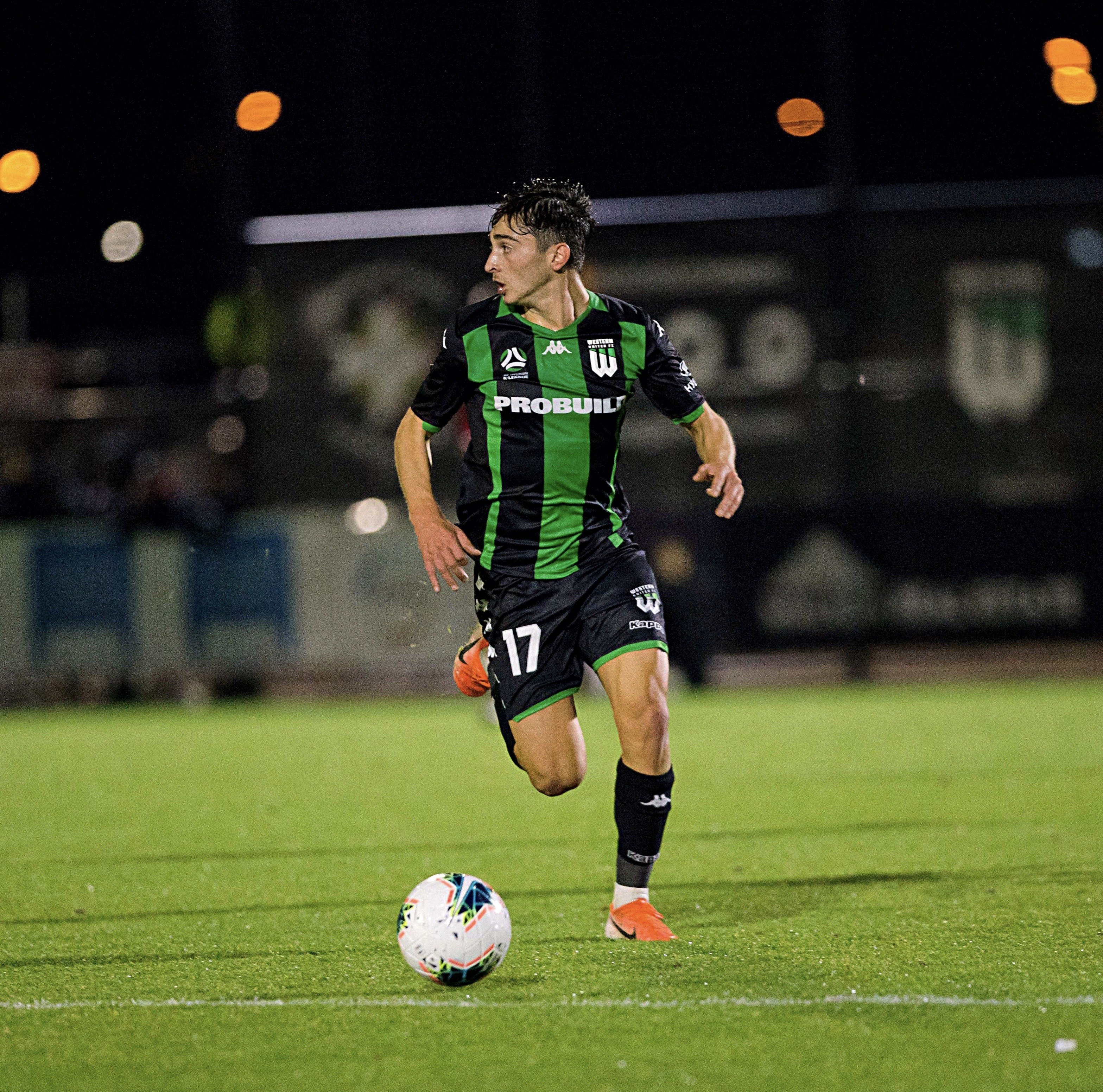
Joshua Cavallo (a player for Western United FC)

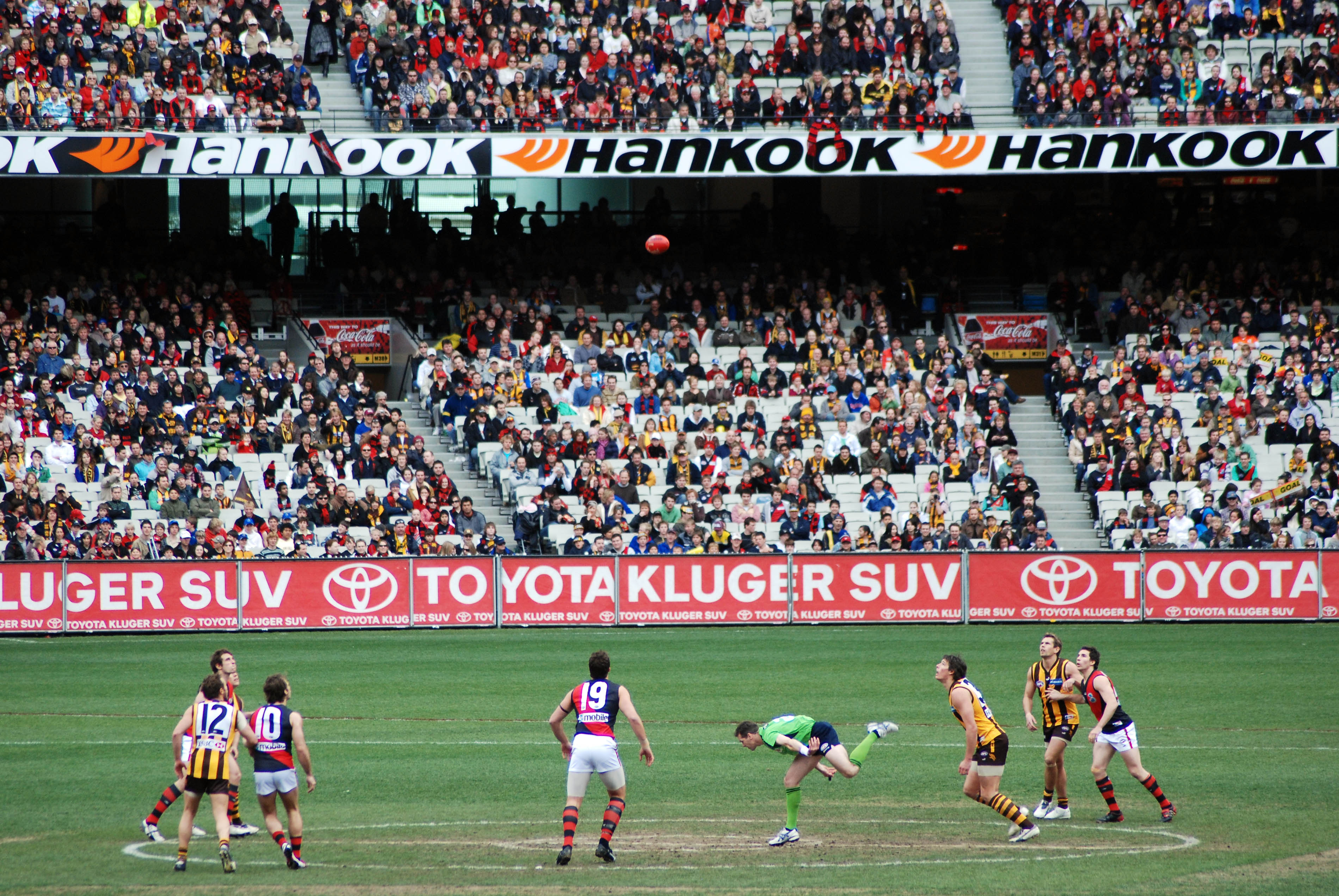
Hawthorn and Essendon Football Clubs at the MCG

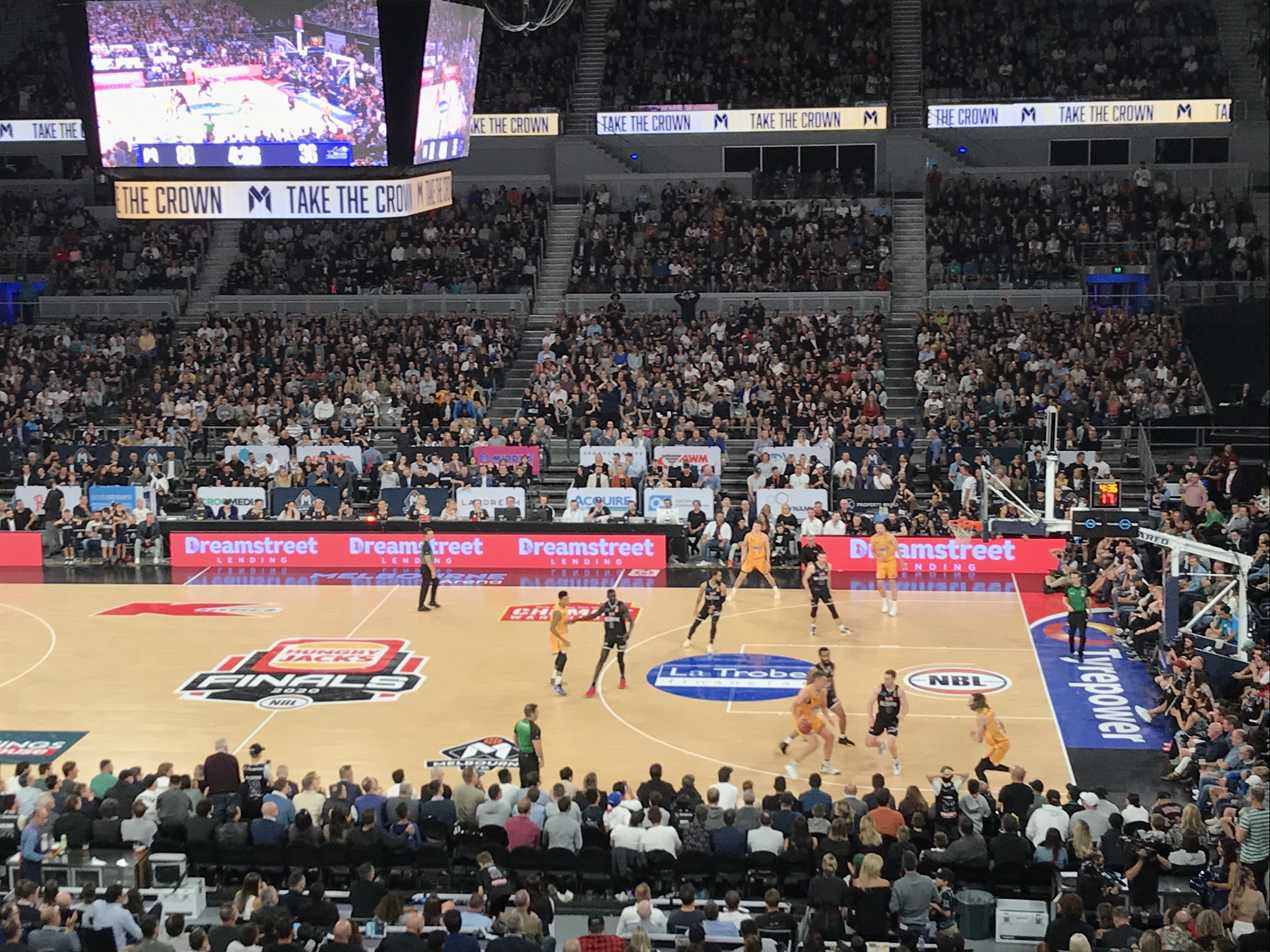
Melbourne United against Sydney Kings at John Cain Arena

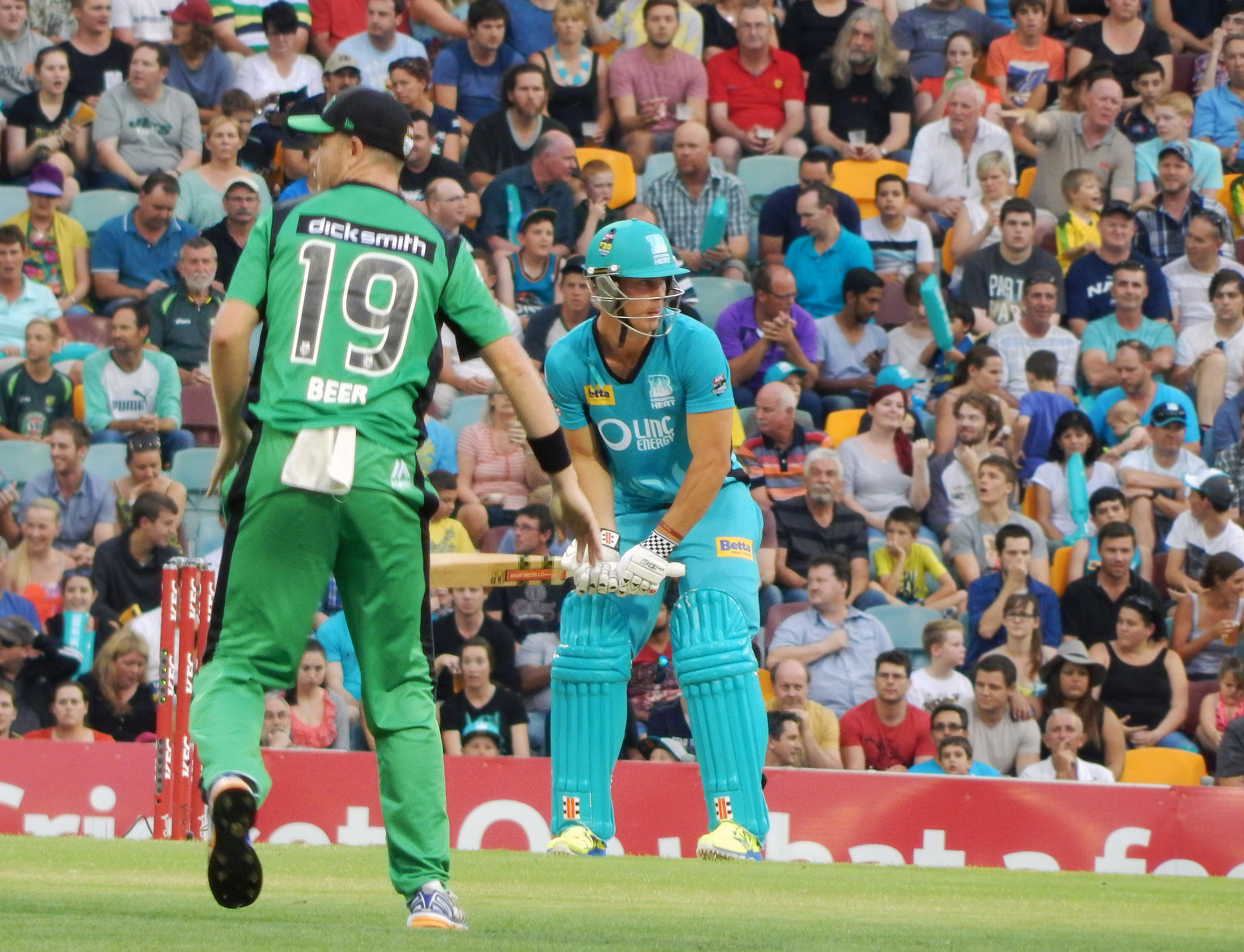
Melbourne Stars against Brisbane Heat

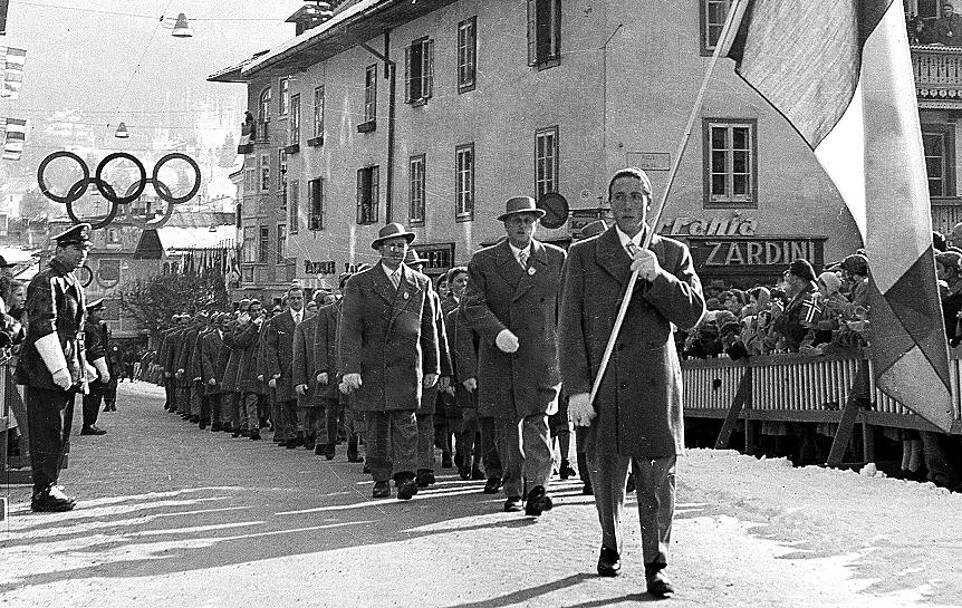
1956 Olympics Village

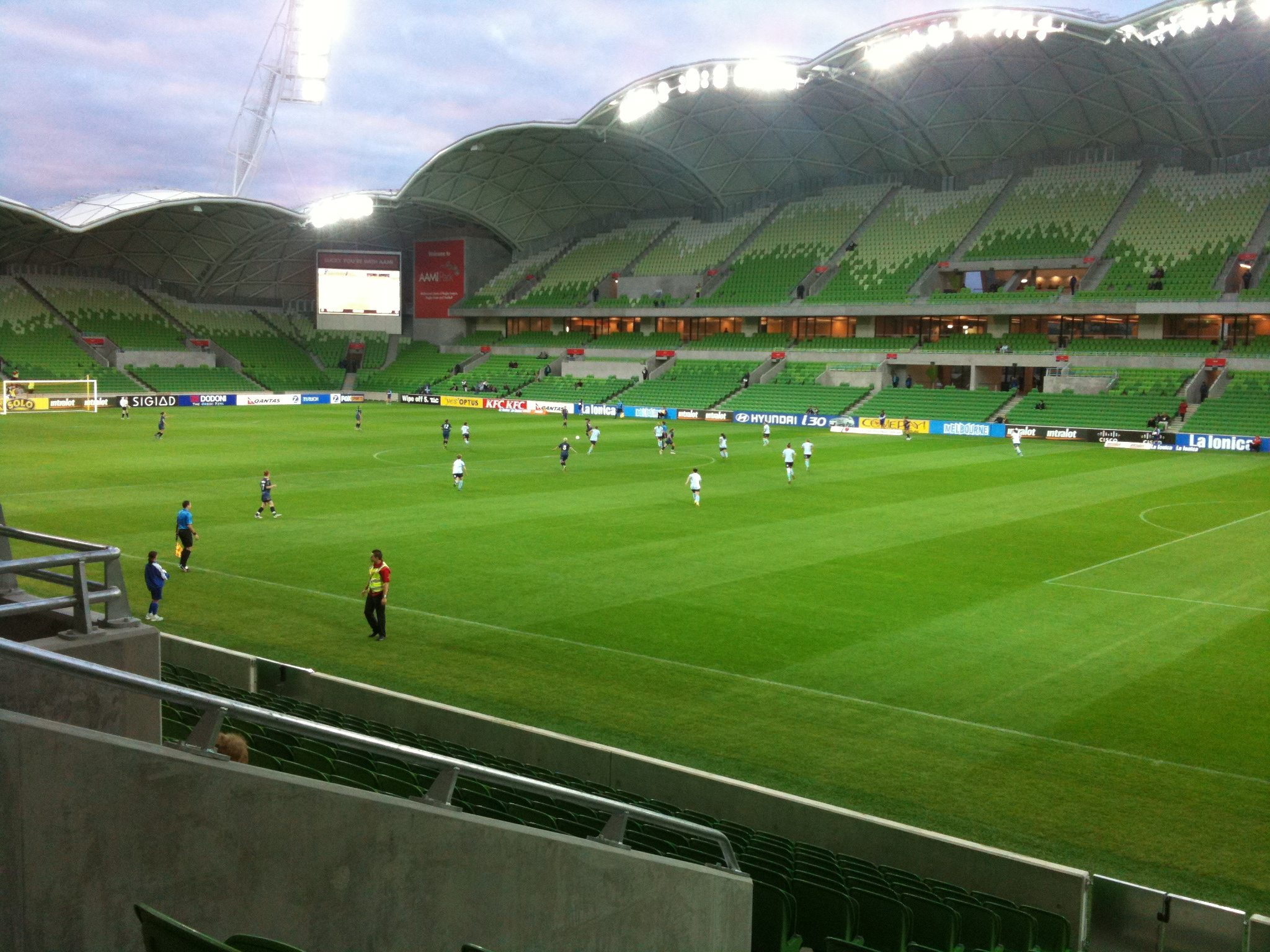
AAMI Park

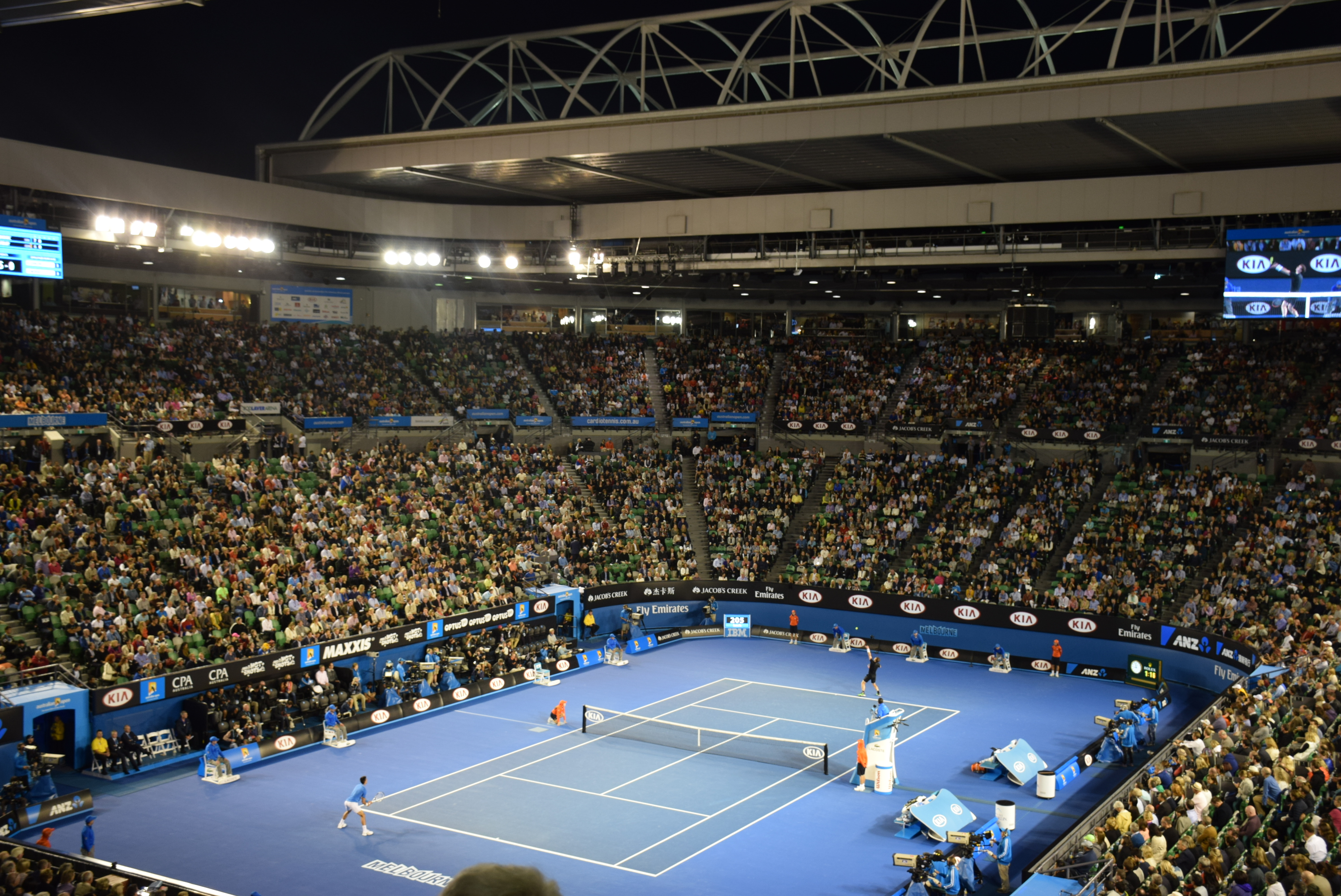
Australian Open at Rod Laver Arena

=== Sport ===
Sport in Melbourne

==== Association Football in Melbourne ====
- Association Football
  - A-League teams in Melbourne
    - Melbourne City FC
    - Melbourne Victory FC
    - Western United FC
  - Football Victoria
- Australian rules football
  - Australian Football League teams in Melbourne
    - Carlton Football Club
    - Collingwood Football Club
    - Essendon Football Club
    - Hawthorn Football Club
    - Melbourne Football Club
    - North Melbourne Football Club
    - Richmond Football Club
    - St. Kilda Football Club
    - Western Bulldogs Football Club

==== Basketball ====
Basketball in Melbourne

- Melbourne Boomers
- Melbourne United
- NBL1 South
- South East Melbourne Phoenix
- Southside Flyers

==== Commonwealth Games ====
- Commonwealth Games
  - 2006 Commonwealth Games
    - 2006 Commonwealth Games medal table
    - Venues of the 2006 Commonwealth Games
  - 2026 Commonwealth Games
    - Venues of the 2026 Commonwealth Games in Melbourne

==== Cricket ====
Cricket in Melbourne

- Big Bash League teams
  - Melbourne Renegades
  - Melbourne Stars
- Cricket Victoria

==== Olympics ====
Olympics in Melbourne

- 1956 Olympic Games
- Venues for the 1956 Olympic Games

==== Netball ====
Netball

- Collingwood Magpies (netball)
- Melbourne Vixens

==== Rugby ====
Rugby in Melbourne

- Rugby League
  - Melbourne Storm
    - 1998 Melbourne Storm season
    - 1999 Melbourne Storm season
    - 2000 Melbourne Storm season
    - 2001 Melbourne Storm season
    - 2002 Melbourne Storm season
    - 2003 Melbourne Storm season
    - 2004 Melbourne Storm season
    - 2005 Melbourne Storm season
    - 2006 Melbourne Storm season
    - 2007 Melbourne Storm season
    - 2008 Melbourne Storm season
    - 2009 Melbourne Storm season
    - 2010 Melbourne Storm season
    - 2011 Melbourne Storm season
    - 2012 Melbourne Storm season
    - 2013 Melbourne Storm season
    - 2014 Melbourne Storm season
    - 2015 Melbourne Storm season
    - 2016 Melbourne Storm season
    - 2017 Melbourne Storm season
    - 2018 Melbourne Storm season
    - 2019 Melbourne Storm season
    - 2020 Melbourne Storm season
    - 2021 Melbourne Storm season
    - 2022 Melbourne Storm season
    - 2023 Melbourne Storm season
- Rugby Union
  - Melbourne Rebels

==== Sport venues ====
- Albert Park Circuit
- Caulfield Racecourse
- Flemington Racecourse
- Ikon Park
- Marvel Stadium
- Melbourne Sports and Entertainment Precinct
  - AAMI Park
  - John Cain Arena
  - Margaret Court Arena
  - Melbourne Cricket Ground
  - Rod Laver Arena
  - Show Court Arena
- O'Brien Icehouse
- Victoria Park
- Whitten Oval

==== Tennis ====
- 1980 Hortico Melbourne Indoor Championships
- Australian Open

== Economy and infrastructure ==
- Banks
  - ANZ
  - Bank of Melbourne
  - ME Bank
  - NAB
- Hotels in Melbourne
  - Adelphi Hotel
  - Brighton Savoy Hotel
  - Crown Towers
  - Fawkner's Hotel
  - Federal Coffee Palace
  - The Langham
  - Southern Cross Hotel
  - Toorak Manor
  - Transport Hotel
  - Hotel Windsor
- Shopping Centres in Melbourne
  - Chadstone Shopping Centre
  - Eastland Shopping Centre
  - Highpoint Shopping Centre
  - Melbourne Central
  - Pacific Werribee
  - Westfield Doncaster
  - Westfield Fountain Gate
  - Westfield Knox
  - Westfield Southland
- Tourism in Melbourne
  - Central Business District
  - Chinatown
  - Crown Entertainment Complex
  - Docklands
  - Eureka Skydeck
  - Federation Square
  - Luna Park
  - Melbourne Cricket Ground
  - Melbourne Museum
  - National Gallery of Victoria
  - Queen Victoria Market
  - Southbank Promenade
  - St Kilda

=== Transport ===
Transport in Melbourne

- Air transport
  - Airports serving Melbourne
    - Melbourne Airport
    - Avalon Airport
    - Essendon Airport
    - Moorabbin Airport
- Maritime transport in Melbourne
  - Port Phillip Ferries
  - Spirit of Tasmania
  - Station Pier

==== Public transport ====
- 1969 Melbourne Transportation Plan
- Buses in Melbourne
  - Bus operators in Melbourne
- Rail transport
  - Railways in Melbourne
    - City Loop
    - Closed railway stations in Melbourne
    - Major railway stations
      - Flinders Street Station
      - Southern Cross Station
      - Melbourne Central Station
      - Parliament Station
      - Flagstaff Station
    - Railway lines in Melbourne
      - List of Melbourne train lines
      - Future expansion of Melbourne railways
- Trams
  - Tram routes in Melbourne
  - Melbourne tram fleet
  - Proposed Melbourne tram extensions
  - Yarra Trams
- Trains
  - Metro Trains Melbourne
  - Melbourne rail fleet
  - V/Line

==== Roads ====
- Freeways
  - Calder Freeway
  - CityLink Southern
  - CityLink Western
  - EastLink
  - Eastern Freeway
  - Frankston Freeway
  - Monash Freeway
  - Mornington Peninsula Freeway
  - Princes Freeway
  - South Gippsland Freeway
  - Tullamarine Freeway
  - West Gate Freeway
  - Western Freeway
  - Western Ring Road
- Highways in Melbourne
- Toll roads in Melbourne
- VicRoads

== Education ==
Education in Melbourne

- Schools in Melbourne
  - List of government schools in Melbourne
  - List of non-government schools in Melbourne
  - List of high schools in Melbourne
- Universities in Melbourne
  - Australian Institute of Music
  - Australian Catholic University
  - Deakin University
  - La Trobe University
  - Monash University
  - Royal Gurkhas Institute of Technology
  - Royal Melbourne Institute of Technology
  - Swinburne University of Technology
  - University of Melbourne
  - University of Divinity
  - Victoria University
- Research institutes in Melbourne
  - Australian Regenerative Medicine Institute
  - Australian Stem Cell Centre
  - Australian Synchrotron
  - Baker Heart and Diabetes Institute
  - Bio21 Institute
  - Burnet Institute
  - Howard Florey Institute
  - La Trobe Institute for Molecular Science
  - Melbourne Neuropsychiatry Centre
  - Murdoch Children's Research Institute
  - Peter MacCallum Cancer Centre
  - St. Vincent's Institute of Medical Research
  - The Walter and Eliza Hall Institute of Medical Research

== Healthcare ==
- Hospitals in Melbourne
  - Angliss Hospital
  - Austin Hospital
  - Box Hill Hospital
  - Frankston Hospital
  - Jessie McPherson Private Hospital
  - Monash Children's Hospital
  - Monash Medical Centre
  - Royal Children's Hospital
  - Royal Melbourne Hospital
  - Royal Victorian Eye and Ear Hospital
  - Royal Women's Hospital
  - St Vincent's Hospital
  - Sunshine Hospital
  - The Alfred Hospital
  - The Northern Hospital
  - Werribee Mercy Hospital

== See also ==
- Melbourne
- Outline of geography
  - Outline of Australia
    - Outline of Sydney
