= Brighton Savoy Hotel =

Hotel in Victoria, Australia

Brighton Savoy

General information
- Location: 150 Esplanade, Brighton, Victoria, Victoria, Australia
- Coordinates: 37°54′55.1″S 144°59′15.4″E
- Opening: 1959; 67 years ago

Technical details
- Floor count: 3

Other information
- Number of rooms: 60
- Number of restaurants: 1
- Parking: on-site

Website
- www.brightonsavoy.com.au

Brighton Savoy was a 4.5 star hotel located in the Bayside suburb of Brighton, Victoria in Australia. The location for Brighton Savoy was originally built in 1909.

In June 2023 the hotel was sold for 120 million dollars to the Prime Land group.

The hotel website continues to operate as an accommodation, hospitality, travel, wedding, dining and experience blog specialising in digital marketing. Promoting the local bayside community and offering an accommodation booking service with Expedia

Owned by the Lee family of Brighton for over 58 years, Brighton Savoy was a beach-front hotel and an award-winning events and wedding reception venue.

In October 2025 the hotel site was demolished be redeveloped as an apartment complex to be called Maison Savoy. The existing two level basement carpark will be incorporated into the new development

On the 16th April 2026 Lowe Living, has officially commenced construction on its $160million, ultra-exclusive Maison Savoy project with a turning of the sod ceremony.

== History ==
Prior to Brighton Savoy's establishment as a hotel, the location for Brighton Savoy was originally built in 1909 as a luxurious private mansion. In the 1930s, St Leonard's Presbyterian Girl's College used it as accommodation and an official boarding house for girls from the country. By the 1940s, it was known as Manoa and then as the 'Savoy Private Hotel'. The ballroom was often used for functions and guests began booking it for weddings. In 1959, permits for extension were granted, allowing for a motel with function rooms to be constructed.

Brighton Savoy made a name for itself as a function venue, hosting the Second Logie Awards in 1960 during which Graham Kennedy won the Logie Award for Most Popular Personality. Brighton Savoy was bought by the Lee family in 1967, under whose ownership and management it remains today.

In December 2022 the Brighton Savoy website became a digital marketing platform offering guest post advertising opportunities for businesses in the International and Australian hospitality, wedding, accommodation, travel, and tourism industries.

In February 2023 the Brighton Savoy commenced offering a unique location for film, TV, and advertising projects. With elegant architecture, grand ballrooms, and versatile spaces, it caters to a range of cinematic needs. The venue is available exclusively to production teams, ensuring privacy and seamless shooting. It provides modern amenities while maintaining its historic charm. Previous shoots include commercials, music videos, and TV series.

In June 2023 The Brighton Savoy commenced affiliate market with Expedia.com, allow accommodation, flights and cruises to be book on the site.

== Notable guests ==
Brighton Savoy has hosted a variety of notable guests, including: English glamour model Sabrina and Australian politician Bob Hawke.

== Brighton Beach Web camera ==
In 2020, the hotel introduced a free live streaming beach camera that features Brighton Beach. The camera vision has been well received by both locals and international viewers, who utilise the vision as a quick wind and weather check for Kite surfers or as a tranquil viewing experience.

== Bayside Tourism Network ==
In 2014 the Brighton Savoy's Managing director Michael Lee was appointed to the Bayside Council's Bayside Tourism Network.

Tourism Network members contribute to successful local projects such as the Concourse Car and Bike Show, Shops on Show, Christmas in Bayside and much. The Bayside Tourism Network aims to better tourism in Bayside. As of January 2023 Michael is still a member of the network group.

== Music and art ==
In June 2014, Brighton Savoy's venue was the location for music and art, including the location for the Melbourne-based performance artist, choreographer and dancer, Daniel Pegler's video "Clone".

In August 2014, it was the video location for the music video by South African-born Australian actor, YouTuber, singer and songwriter Troye Sivan for his song "Happy Little Pill" released by EMI Recorded Music Australia Pty Ltd.

== In the media ==
In January 2014, Brighton Savoy was publicised in the Bayside Leader newspaper in an article titled 'Brighton Savoy hotel criticised for sending out Valentine's Day mistress group email' in response to Brighton Savoy sending an e-mail offer to their e-mail subscribers stating "Come and join us with your special friend, partner or mistress for a romantic evening of sunsets, roses, wining and dining in the Seaview Restaurant". The Bayside Leader reported that one of their readers 'Linda' (last name withheld) said she was "appalled by the tone of the Brighton Savoy email promoting a February 14 feast in its restaurant." In the article, Michael Lee, Brighton Savoy owner is quoted as saying "Our social media department has been severely rebuked. I apologise sincerely. I can understand why some people would be offended."

On 27 April 2020, hotel owner Michael Lee was featured in an article by the Australian Financial Review, where he discussed the impact of COVID-19 on the Australian hotel industry.

As a result of Covid lockdowns the Brighton Savoy was closed in March 2020, you can view the Covid experience for a hotel in Melbourne Australia

State and Federal Government COVID-19 policies severely restricted the hotel's ability to trade and as a result the hotel was closed for 18 out of 24 months from March 2022 to November 2021. During this period the hotel actively lobbied many different media outlets from Channel 9, Channel 7, Sky news, Herald Sun, Financial Review, 3AW, The Guardian and many more to gain support and a roadmap.
