= King Street Bridge (Melbourne) =

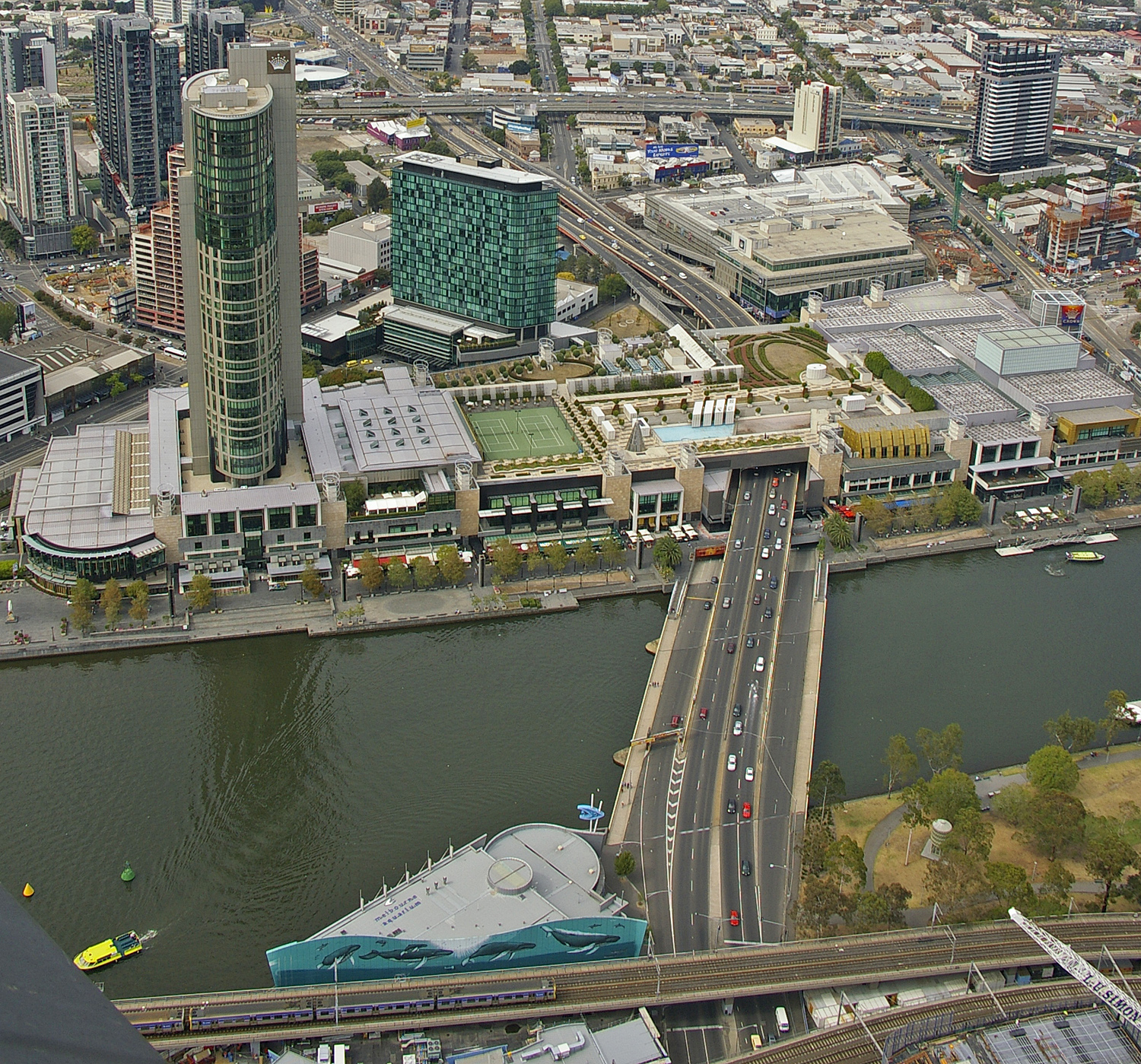
- The bridge, looking towards Crown Casino from the Rialto Towers
- Coordinates: 37°49′19″S 144°57′29″E
- Carries: King Street (vehicles, pedestrians, cyclists)
- Crosses: Yarra River
- Locale: Melbourne, Victoria, Australia
- Begins: Melbourne city centre
- Ends: Southbank
- Other name: Kings Bridge
- Maintained by: VicRoads
- Preceded by: Queens Bridge
- Followed by: Clarendon Street Bridge

Characteristics
- Design: Plate girder bridge
- Material: Steel
- Pier construction: Concrete

History
- Designer: Hardcastle & Richards
- Constructed by: Utah Construction Company
- Fabrication by: BHP
- Opened: 12 April 1961; 65 years ago

Location
- Interactive map of King Street Bridge

The King Street Bridge, also known as the Kings Bridge, is a plate girder bridge that carries King Street over the Yarra River in the city centre of Melbourne, Victoria, Australia. The bridge continues south as an elevated viaduct, with the Crown Casino built around it in later years. The bridge is welded, steel girder with concrete deck and cantilever-suspended span construction, with suspended spans up to approximately 30 metres (100 ft) long.

When it opened in 1961, the bridge had eight lanes across the Yarra River, two through lanes in each direction connecting King Street to Kings Way, in addition to two lanes on each side that connected to King Street to Yarra Bank Road. At the south end north facing on and off ramps connected to Whiteman Street, and the running lanes from the viaduct descend to ground level, with tram route 58 emerging from City Road to the median strip. In the 1990s, the development of Crown Casino closed Yarra Bank Road, and the bridge ramps were connected to the basement carpark of the casino complex.

The south end of the bridge has been undergoing differential settlement between the approach ramps resting on fill, and the suspended section supported by bored piles.

== History ==
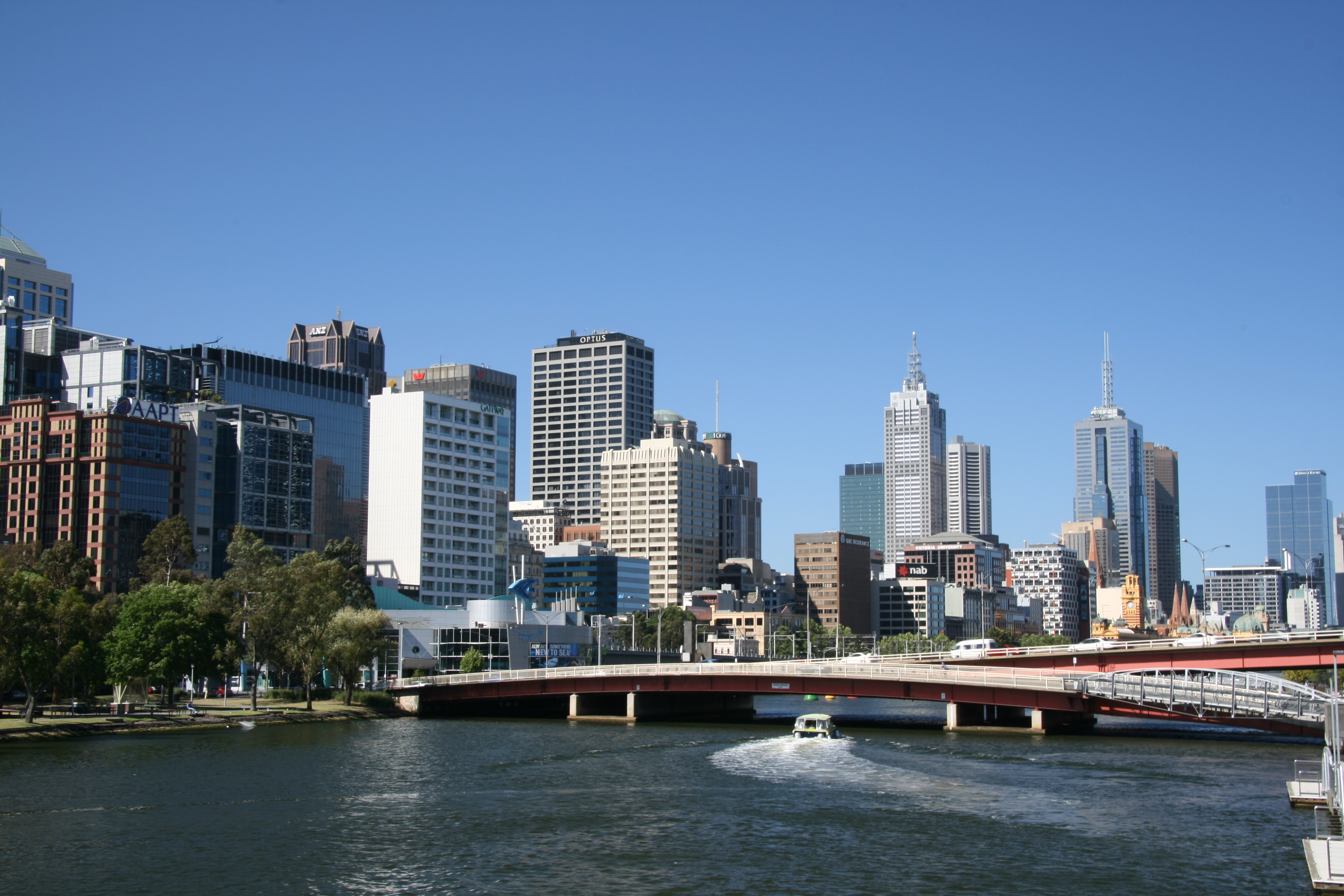
Viewed from the west

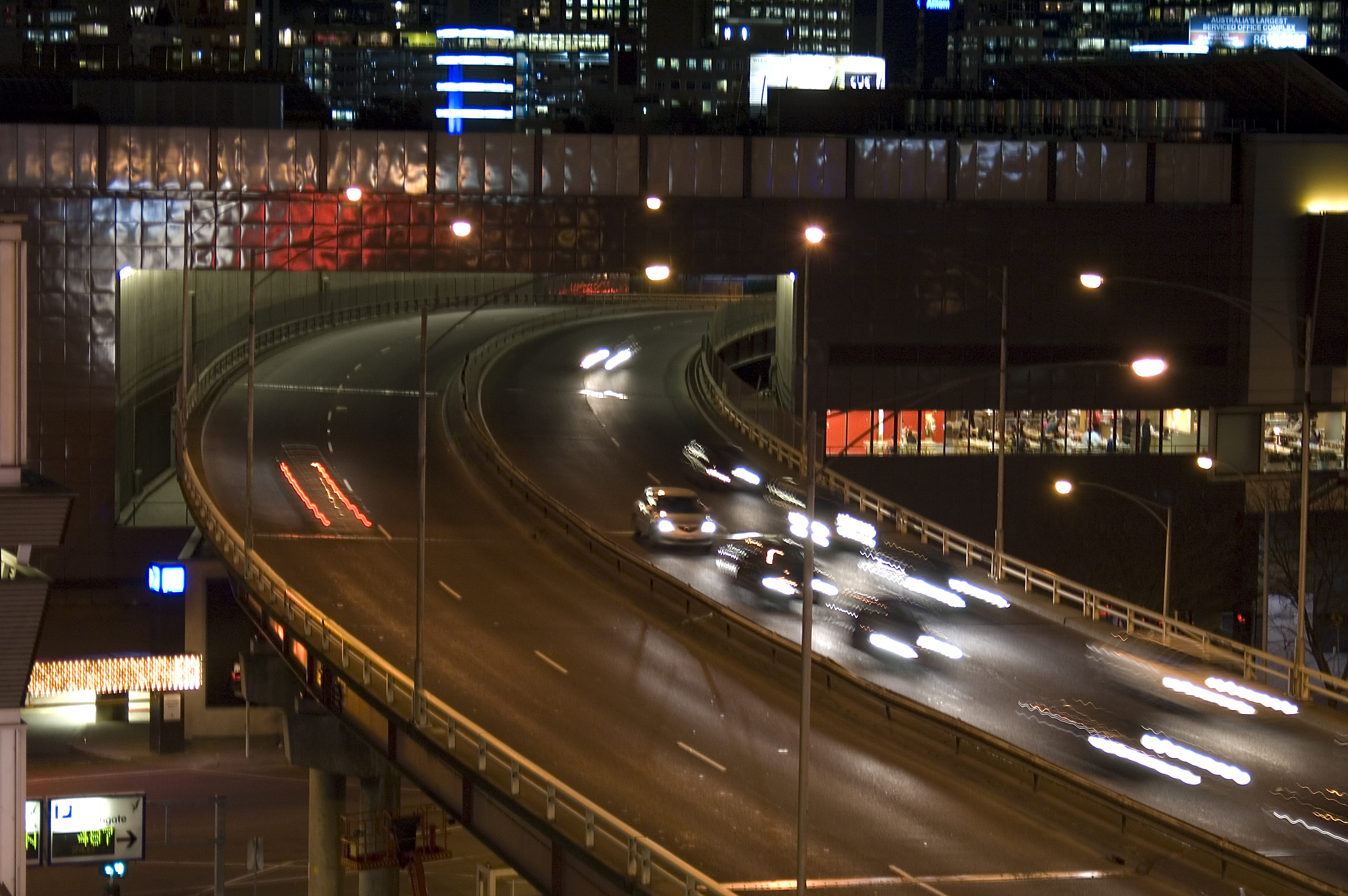
Elevated section of Kingsway headed north through Crown Casino

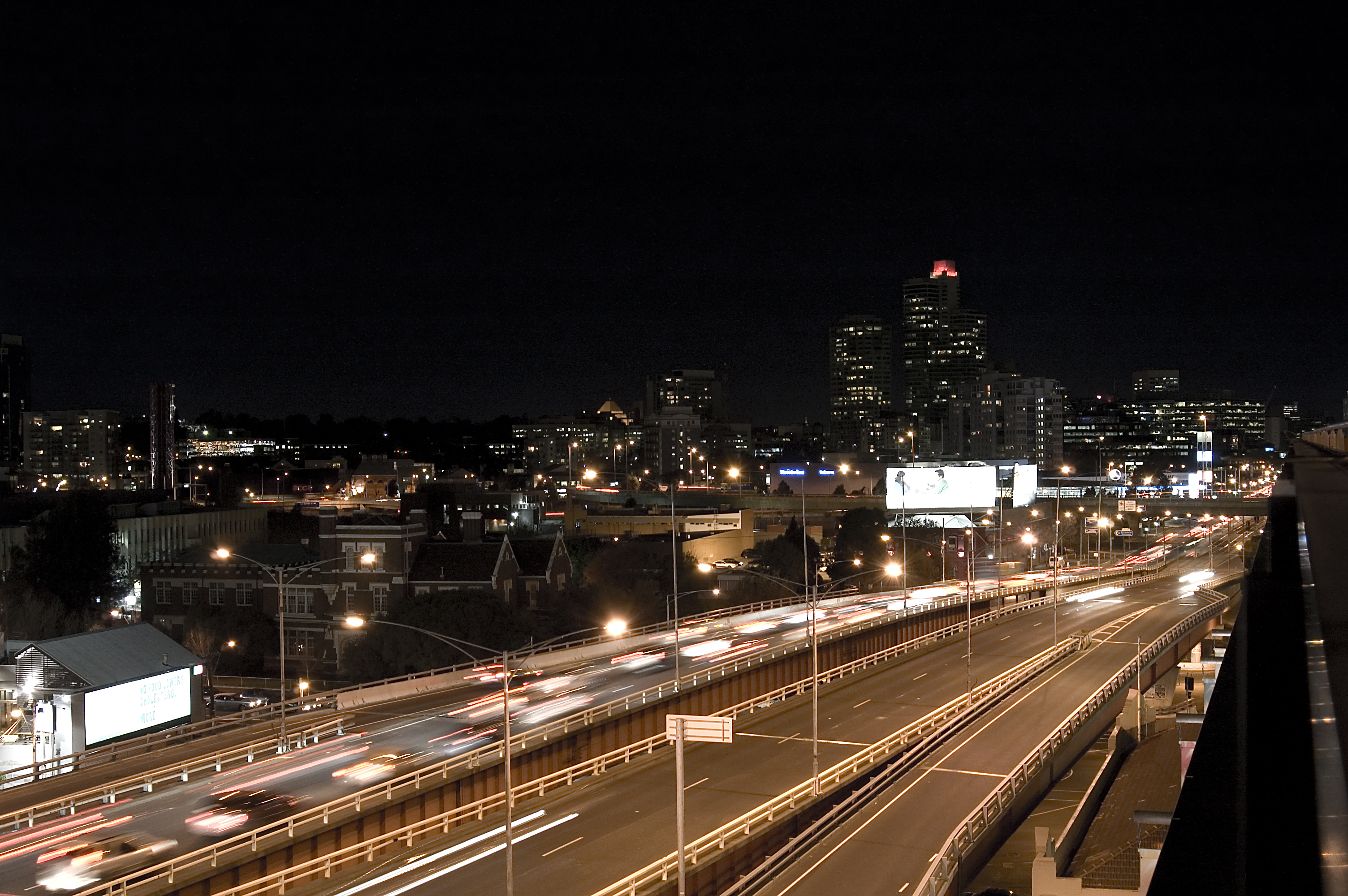
Looking south to the end of the elevated section of Kingsway

The Country Roads Board, under instructions from the government, prepared specifications in 1956 for a bridge to cross the Yarra River. Expectations were of world-wide tenders for the design and construction of a bridge 410 feet (120 m) long and 149 feet (45 m) wide and having a continued elevated structure 1,880 feet (570 m) long and 63 feet (19 m) wide over the Yarra River at King Street, together with a viaduct crossing above the Port Melbourne and St Kilda railway lines, Whiteman Street, Queensbridge Street, City Road and Hanna Street, and returning to the present level of Hanna Street (later Kings Way) near Grant Street, South Melbourne. Together with the construction of the Flinders Street overpass, the whole project was estimated to cost A£3.5&nbps;million. Seven organisations submitted a total of 14 tenders for the work when tenders closed on 29 January 1957, and after examination by the Board's officers, the government accepted the tender of Utah Australia.

Contractors from Utah Australia began their operations on the site on 25 November 1957, building a temporary bridge to give access to the eventual location of the bridge's piers over the river. The passing of the King-street Bridge Act 1957 through the Parliament of Victoria on 18 December 1957, granted formal permission for the bridge to be built, gave the Country Roads Board powers to take ownership of relevant lands and not to inhibit the operations of the Port Melbourne and St Kilda railway lines during construction, declared the road a "public highway" once completed, and apportioned the total cost of to be borne as follows: 65% by the Victorian government, 30% by the City of Melbourne, and 5% by the City of South Melbourne.

The King Street Bridge was designed in 1959 by Hardcastle & Richards, consulting engineers for Utah Australia, on behalf of the Country Roads Board, and constructed over the next two years. The substructure of the main bridge was completed in November 1959, and the east and west lanes of the low-level bridge over the Yarra were completed except for hand-railing and lighting.

Traffic commenced using the east and west lanes of the low-level bridge in November 1960, and on 12 April 1961, the main bridge was opened by the Premier of Victoria Henry Bolte.

== Collapse ==
Soon after completion, on 10 July 1962, one span collapsed under the weight of a 43-tonne (47-short-ton) semi-trailer, though the weight was within the bridge limits.

The following, except for the "Reconstruction" section, is taken from the report of the Royal Commission.

=== Short history ===
- September 1956. Design and construct tenders called by the Country Roads Board of Victoria (CRB) as the Constructing Authority.
- May 1957. Tenders awarded.
- September 1957. Work started.
- April 1961. Open to traffic.
- October 1961. Bridge handed over to Melbourne and Metropolitan Board of Works (MMBW) as a metropolitan highway.
- July 1962. Bridge collapsed.
- September 1962 to August 1963. Royal Commission into the Failure of Kings Bridge.

=== Participants for construction ===
- CRB (Country Roads Board) – Constructing authority and contract principal
- UTAH Aust Ltd – Principal contractor
- J&W Johns & Waygood – Subcontractor to Utah for fabrication, erection and painting of girders
- H&R Hardcastle & Richards, consulting engineers, subcontractor to Utah for detailed design of superstructure
- BHP Broken Hill Propriety Ltd. for supply of steel

=== Design ===
The superstructure design by H&R incorporated standard design details for girders and cover plates as was common at the time for mild steel construction. CRB had allowed in the tender the use of high tensile steel to British Standard BS 968:1941. H&R chose to use this steel to reduce weight, so economising on the cost of the foundations. Design and construction of the foundations was undertaken by UTAH.

Included in the CRB tender documents were comprehensive specifications for fabrication in high tensile steel to be read in conjunction with and additional to those of BS 968 -1941. (It was suggested that the Standard may have had erroneous guidelines that were not supported by experience, and that were relied upon for this design).

Neither UTAH nor J&W ever really appreciated the differences that high tensile steel presented in its fabrication, particularly with regards to welding. Therein started the road to failure.

=== Material supply ===
J&W, when placing their order for steel from BHP, failed to require additional tests as per the CRB specifications. As a result, BHP only supplied ladle analyses. BHP even stated to J&W at some stage that Izod tests for ductility as per the CRB specifications were useless.

Not all tensile and Izod tests for different plate thicknesses were carried out.

Steel supplied by BHP was generally very close to the maximum tolerances regarding chemical composition. It was later revealed that the chemical composition of plates sometimes exceeded specification even when ladle analysis was within specification. BHP also did not appreciate the welding requirements for high tensile steel and even advised J&W on occasion that even when the chemical composition shown by ladle analysis exceeded specification, the steel was still weldable. Brittleness was of prime importance and under test, some samples did not even show a yield point.

=== Cover plates and welding ===
H&R placed the transverse welded ends of cover plates of tension flanges in regions of low stress as permitted by the specifications. Had proper consideration been given during fabrication to weld preparation, the failure of the bridge may not have occurred. The greatest oversight appeared to be the lack of, or insufficient, preheat around the weld area to limit the intensity of residual stresses in the heat affected zone. In these circumstances, brittle fracture was almost guaranteed. In fact, all the cracks occurred in the HAZ of the plate material. (On the other hand, it appears unlikely that preheating could be consistently applied, and that difficulties in application could have resulted in variations in the properties of the steel, including strength loss and stress inconsistencies over the affected or nearby areas – possibly causing similar or other types of failure, such as long-term fatigue).

Izod tests for plate and welds were specified. Many Izod tests, particularly for welds, were repeated after an initial failure until a pass was achieved.

The Commission Report stated that "A more callous disregard of the value of acceptance tests it would be difficult to imagine."

=== Fabrication inspection ===
During final inspection of girders, under significant pressure of time and very unsatisfactory circumstances, it was likely that the cracks which eventually caused the bridge to fail were missed.

As J&W were responsible for all plate tests, for which they were not particularly convinced were necessary, there was a great deal of bickering between CRB inspectors and J&W shop staff. The Commissioners in their report made the statement that "We hardly know whom to blame the more, J&W for its cavalier attitude or CRB for putting up with it."

=== Reconstruction ===
As authority in charge of the bridge at time of failure, MMBW was responsible for the design of the reconstruction method.

MMBW Highways Division carried out this work. The engineering staff were William (Bill) Burren, chief engineer, Highways Division; Stan Long, 2nd in charge, Bruce Day, chief structural engineer; Shandor Mokos and Tom Dobson, senior structural engineers; and Graham Ebbage, assistant structural engineer. All are deceased (2020) bar Ebbage who went on to design bridges in Melbourne, Brisbane and Hong Kong.

It had to be assumed that all girders contained cracks, whether presently detected or not. It was therefore decided to post tension all girders so as to leave no parts in tension.

As each span consisted of four girders, it was decided to construct large heavily reinforced concrete blocks at the ends of each pair of girders. These were to house the anchor blocks of the post tensioning cables. These blocks were held between the girders by heavy high tensile rods passing through each block from girder to girder, averaging about 19 rods each.

The cables were of the Freyssinet type with cast iron wedges fastening each cable into a mating block. Each cable was made up of a number of strands each containing seven high tensile wires. As an example, on span no. 11, 110 feet long, the total prestressing force employed amounted to about 11000 tonnes.

To protect the cables from corrosion, the cables were enclosed in fibre cement ducts and then high pressure grouted. These are what some people now see as pipes under the bridge.

The reconstruction was carried out by John Holland Constructions. Bruce Day was MMBW site engineer for the contract.

Next bridge upstream	Yarra River	Next bridge downstream
Queens Bridge (vehicles; pedestrians; cyclists)	King Street Bridge	Clarendon Street Bridge (trams; vehicles; pedestrians; cyclists)
