= Princes Bridge =

Bridge across the Yarra River in Melbourne, Victoria, Australia

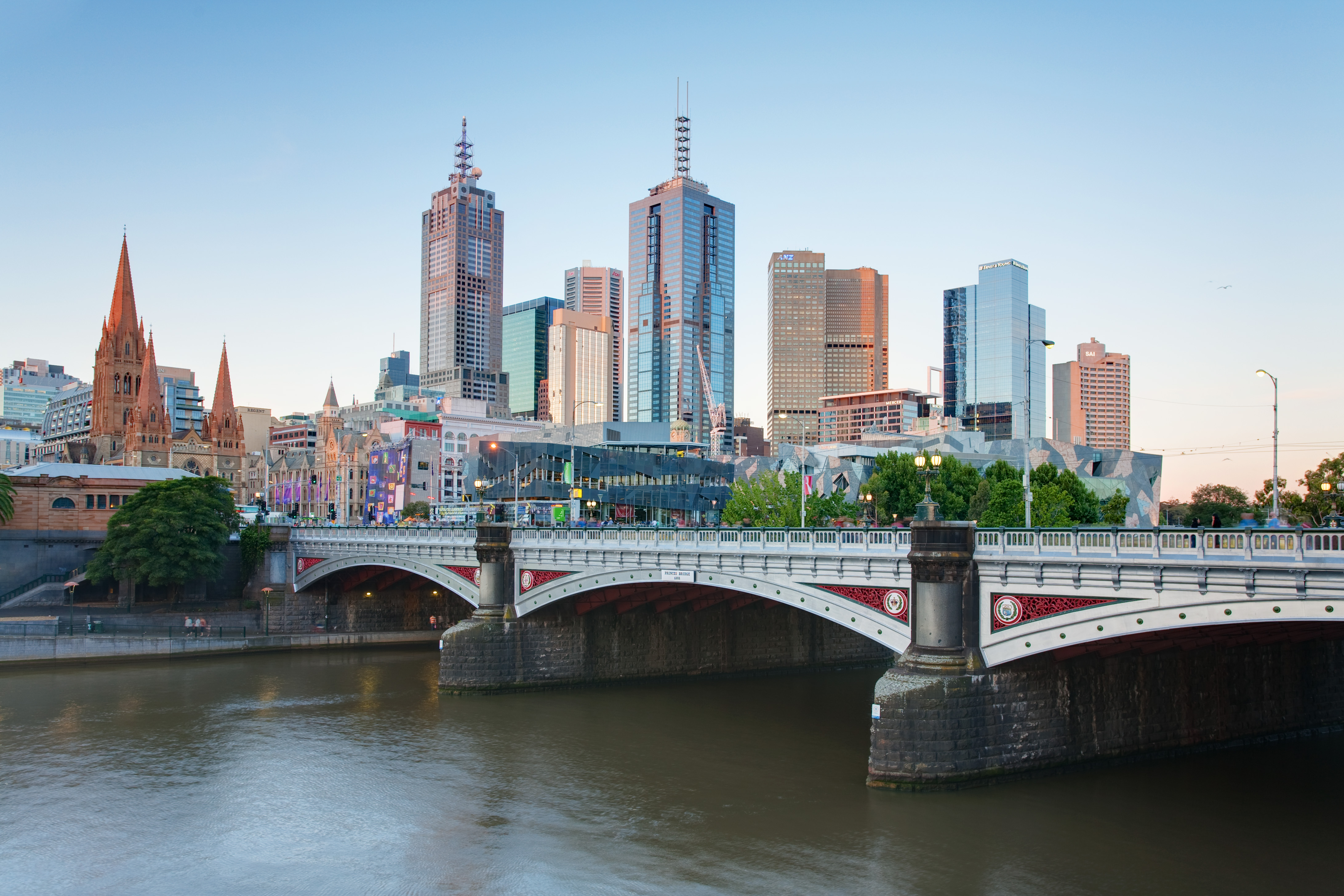
- The bridge looking towards the city centre, Federation Square, St Paul's Cathedral and partially Flinders Street station, 2007
- Coordinates: 37°49′09″S 144°58′06″E
- Carries: Trams, road vehicles, pedestrians, cyclists
- Crosses: Yarra River
- Locale: Melbourne city centre, Victoria, Australia
- Preceded by: Swan Street Bridge
- Followed by: Evan Walker Bridge

Characteristics
- Design: Girder bridge
- Material: Steel
- Total length: 120 m (390 ft)
- Width: 30 m (98 ft)
- No. of spans: 3

History
- Designer: John Grainger
- Construction start: 1886
- Opened: 4 October 1888

Victorian Heritage Register
- Official name: Princes Bridge
- Type: Registered place
- Designated: 20 August 1982
- Reference no.: H1447
- Heritage overlay no.: HO790
- Category: Transport - Road

Location
- Interactive map of Princes Bridge

The Princes Bridge, originally Prince's Bridge, is a girder bridge across the Yarra River, located in the city centre of Melbourne, in Victoria, Australia. It is built on the site of one of the oldest river crossings in the city, and forms a gateway into the central city from the south. The bridge connects Swanston Street on the north bank of the Yarra River to St Kilda Road in Southbank, and carries road, tram and pedestrian traffic.

The present bridge was built in 1888 and was added to the Victorian Heritage Register on 20 August 1982 in recognition of its historical, social, architectural and aesthetic importance.

Because of its position, Princes Bridge is often a focal point for celebratory events in Melbourne such as the Moomba Festival, New Year's Eve and many celebrations taking place on the Yarra River where it flows through the city.

== History ==
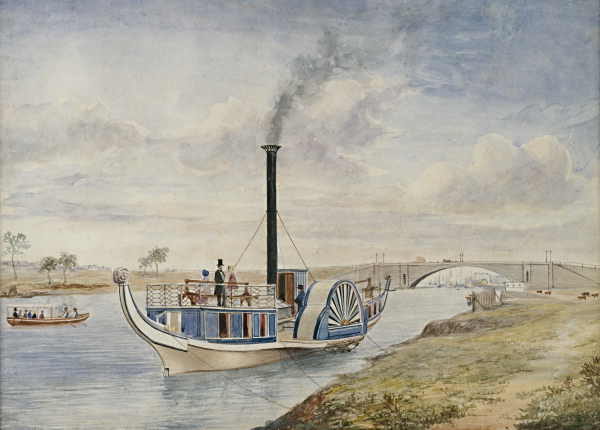
The 1850 bridge appears in this sketch of a paddlesteamer gondola on its way to Cremorne Gardens in 1855.

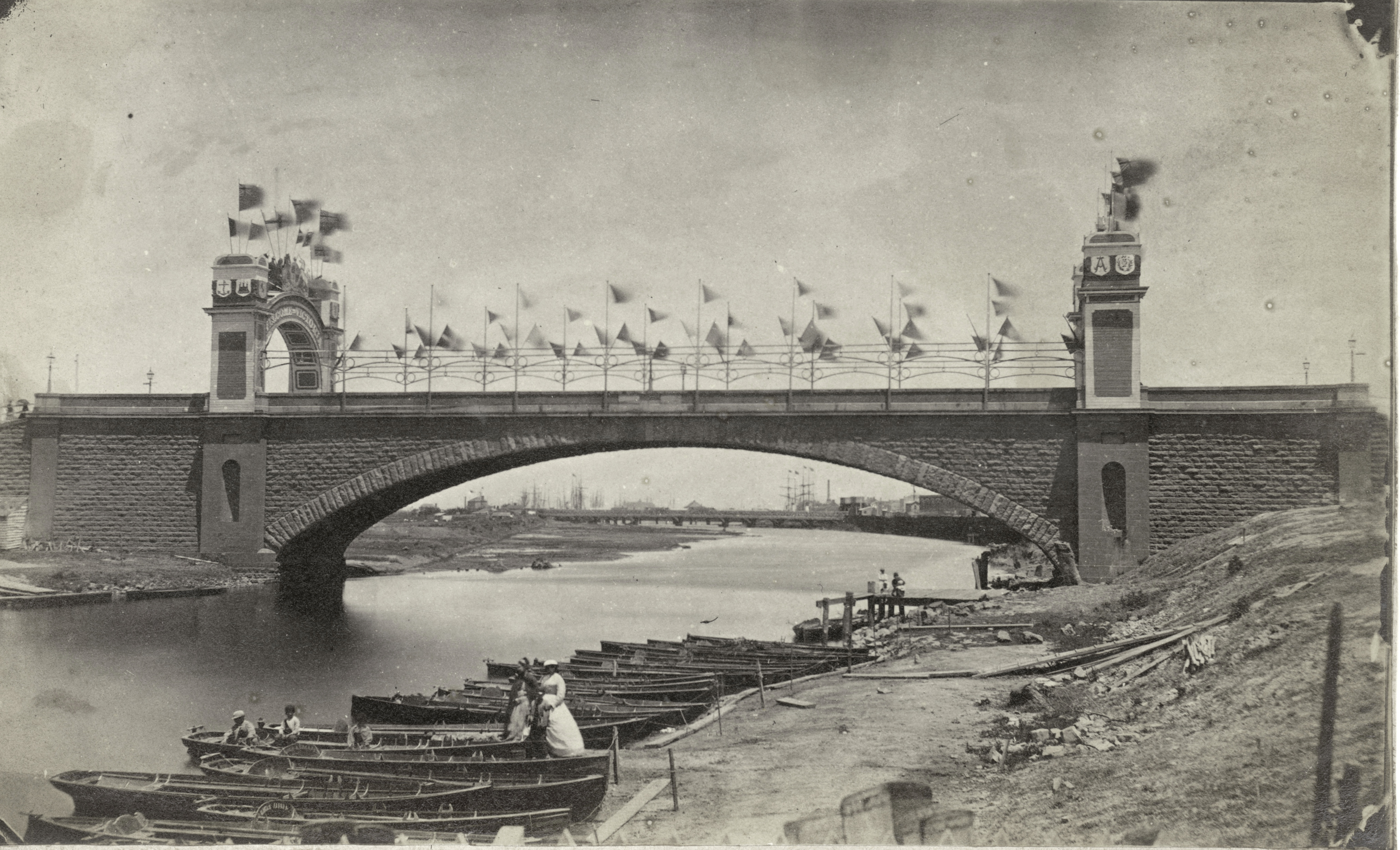
Princes Bridge, Melbourne, c. 1869

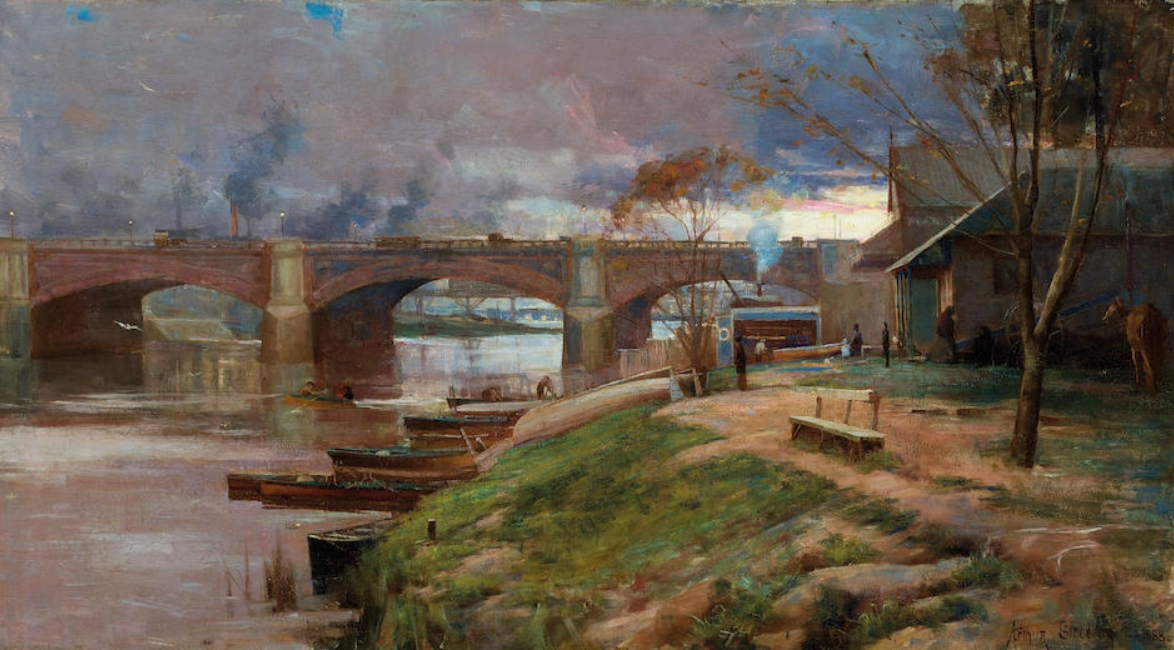
The newly constructed Princes Bridge, painted in 1888 by Arthur Streeton of the Heidelberg School art movement

=== First bridge ===
When the first European settlers settled in Melbourne in 1835, there was no permanent crossing point of the Yarra River. Over time various punt and ferry operators set up business to ferry people and other traffic across the river. The colonial government in Sydney was unreliable in providing funds for the construction of a bridge, resulting in most of Melbourne's early infrastructure being provided by private enterprise. On 22 April 1840, a private company was formed to construct a bridge across the Yarra. Traders in Elizabeth Street vied with those in Swanston Street to have the through traffic that would be generated by a bridge. On the south bank of the river, St Kilda Road was still a dirt track.

The Superintendent of the Port Phillip District, Charles La Trobe, favoured an Elizabeth Street crossing, but despite such official pressure the private company favoured the construction conditions at Swanston Street, which had become regarded as the growing town's main street. In 1844, a wooden trestle bridge was built across the river, and was a toll bridge colloquially known as Balbirnies Bridge. The bridge was built for £400 from June-October 1845 just to the East of where Princes Bridge stands today. Described as "a primitive construction of piles & planking, 120ft. in length & with a road-way 17ft. wide, flanked on one side by a railed-off footpath", it was in use for five years, 1845–48. Tolls were leased to Mr. R. A. Balbirnie, whence the name derived. In disuse from 1848, it was demolished Oct 1852, although famed chronicler of early Melbourne, the journalist "Garyowen" reported some remnant piles from the bridge could still be seen the Yarra's waters as late as 1883.

=== Second bridge ===
The foundation stone for a new bridge was laid in 1846, and the bridge was opened in on 15 November 1850. The opening was incorporated amongst extensive celebrations for royal assent to the Australian Constitutions Act 1850. This act enabled separation from NSW of the Port Phillip District, establishing Victoria as a separate colony effective on 1 July 1851. The bridge was a single-span 150 ft (46 m) bluestone and granite arch bridge, with a rise of only 24 ft (7 m). At its building, it was one of the longest, flattest stone arch bridges in the world. Paid for with government funds, the bridge was designed by David Lennox and built by James Linacre. It was opened on 15 November without tolls.

At the foundation-laying ceremony, Superintendent La Trobe named the structure "Prince's Bridge" in honour of Albert, Prince of Wales. It seems also to have been known as "Lennox’s Bridge," after its designer.

=== Third (current) bridge ===
Within a year of the bridge's opening, gold was discovered in country Victoria and Melbourne saw a massive increase in population. In addition to the increase in traffic crossing the bridge, there was also a need to handle increased shipping traffic on the Yarra River, and the river was widened to cope with this. By that time the Yarra River had been heavily modified both upstream and downstream, and the major floods of the early years were becoming less common. In the late 1870s it was decided to replace the 1850 bridge, and a competition was held in 1879. This was won by architect and engineer John Grainger (1855–1917), (Note: Grainger was the father of the Australian composer Percy Grainger.) only recently arrived in Adelaide, in partnership with local architect Mr Jenkins, with a design largely as eventually built. Jenkins was likely included simply as a local representative, with the design mainly by Grainger, who already had experience with bridges, and who was working alone by the time the bridge was completed. Construction was delayed over funding and other issues, and it was not until 1884 that the old bridge was disassembled and replaced by a temporary structure. The stones were lettered and numbered and neatly stacked, to allow future re-erection at another location. In the event this did not occur, as the materials were instead reused in the replacement bridge.

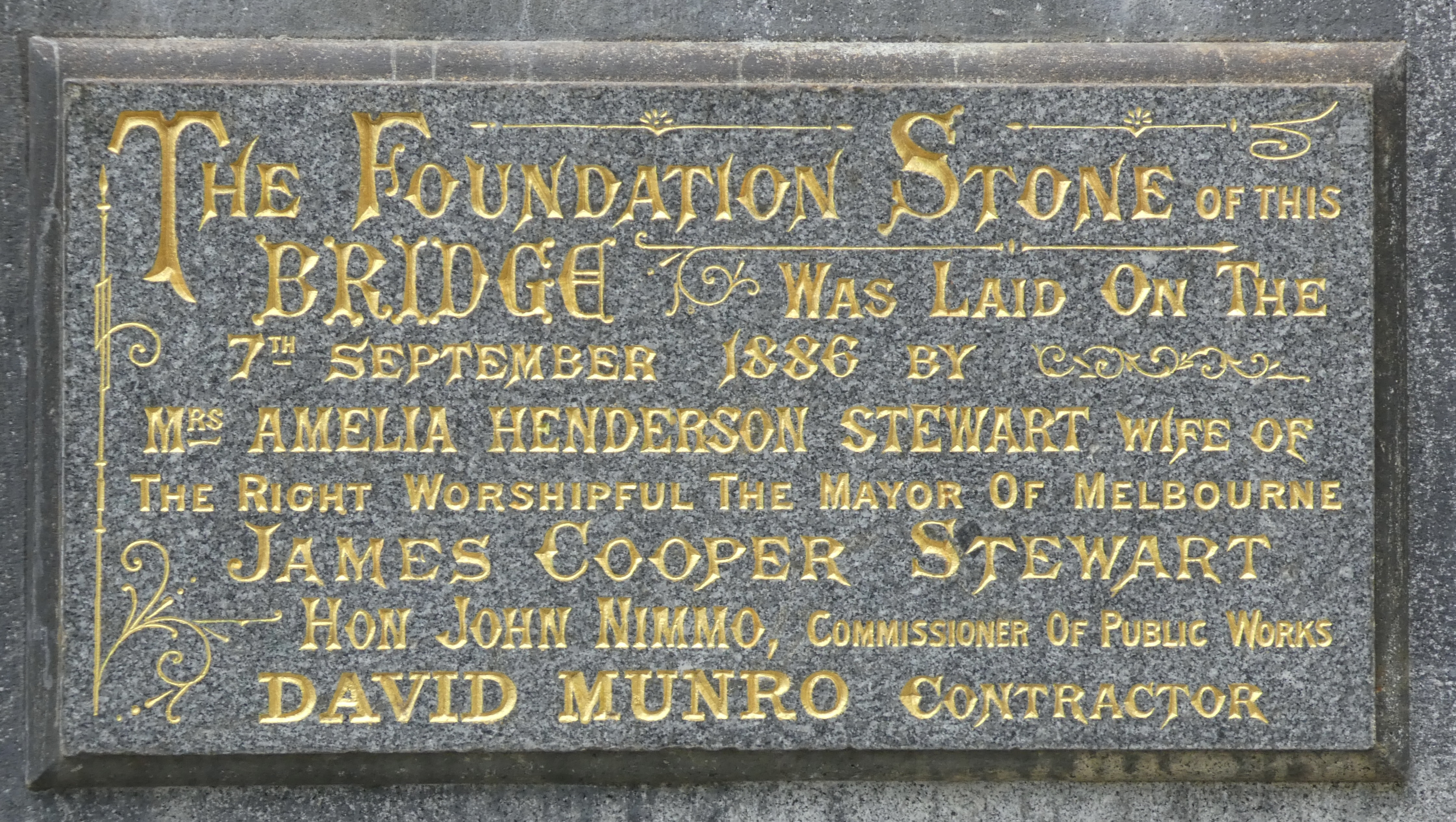
Restored foundation stone, 2025

David Munro & Co. (Note: Munro was also responsible for the construction of Queens Bridge and the nearby Sandridge Bridge.) supplied the winning bid for the construction of £136,998 9s.9d., incorporating reused materials from the old bridge and ironwork fabricated by Langlands foundry in Melbourne.

The foundation stone of the new bridge was laid on 7 September 1886, and a memorial stone with a suitable inscription was built in over its position in the west end of the south abutment. The new bridge was opened on 4 October 1888, in time for the second International Exhibition to be held in Melbourne. As with many historic Melburnian buildings and bridges, the bridge is built on solid bluestone and concrete bulwarks with plenty of cast iron. The abutments, piers and wing walls are built of solid bluestone.

In 1924, the bridge was reinforced to take the weight of the electric trams which were soon to replace the previous cable trams along St Kilda Road and the side-streets. The name of the bridge is now rendered as Princes Bridge, in line with the policy that possessive apostrophes are not used in place names.

Princes Bridge was also the name of a railway station located on the northern side of the river, to the east of the bridge, on the current site of Federation Square. It was linked to Flinders Street station by the railway tracks that run underneath the northern approach to the bridge.

Until about June 2013 there were two vehicle lanes and a tram lane across the bridge in each direction; the wide footpaths on each side were divided for pedestrians and bicycles. At that time the bicycle lanes were moved to the road surface and the number of vehicle lanes was reduced to a single lane in each direction – starting with the Western (in-bound) side.

== Traffic ==
Pedestrians account for the majority of traffic over the bridge, but other forms of traffic include motor vehicles, trams, buses and bicycles, as well as an occasional tourist-orientated horse-drawn carriage. The destination of pedestrian traffic is two way, with many commuters parking at the Arts Centre and going to work in the CBD, as well as visitors to the Melbourne Arts Precinct on the Southbank side.

== Design ==
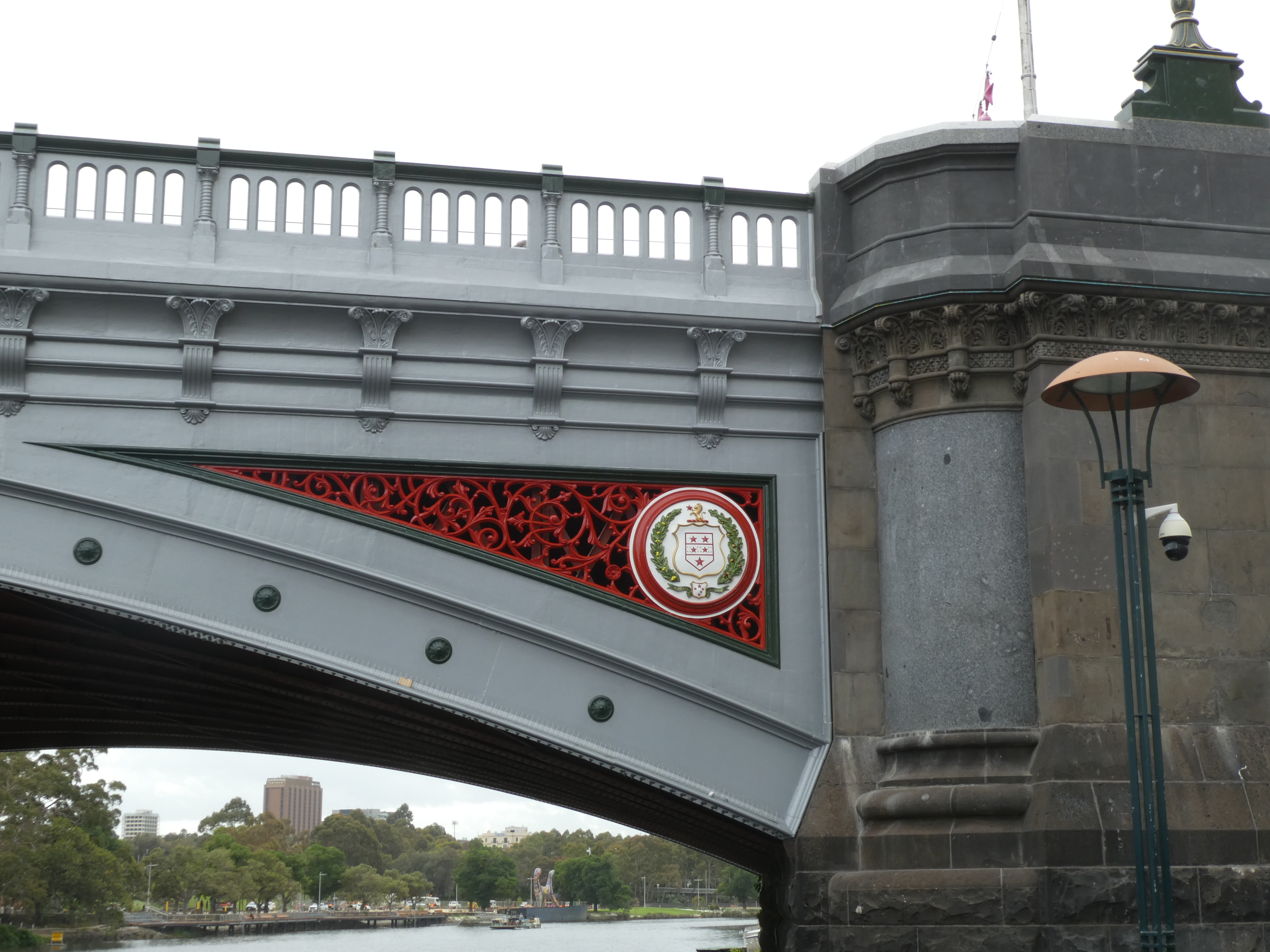
Restored bridge in 2025

Princes Bridge is 30 metres (99 ft) wide and 120 metres (400 ft) long, with Harcourt granite squat half columns resting on the bluestone piers that support the three iron girder arch spans. The coat of arms on the bridge belong to the municipal councils who contributed towards the cost of construction. Other design features include an elaborate balustrade along the top of the bridge, and lamp standards crowning each pier.

The bridge design bears a close resemblance to the earlier Blackfriars Bridge over the River Thames in London, a resemblance which was noted at its opening. Princes Bridge is wider, 30 metres compared with 26 metres, but with 3 spans of 33 metres and an overall length of 131 metres, it is much shorter than Blackfriars Bridge's 5 spans with a central span of 61 metres. Both are excellent surviving examples of Arch Bridge design in the late 19th century.

The bridge underwent a restoration before the 2006 Commonwealth Games and again in 2025.

== Gallery ==
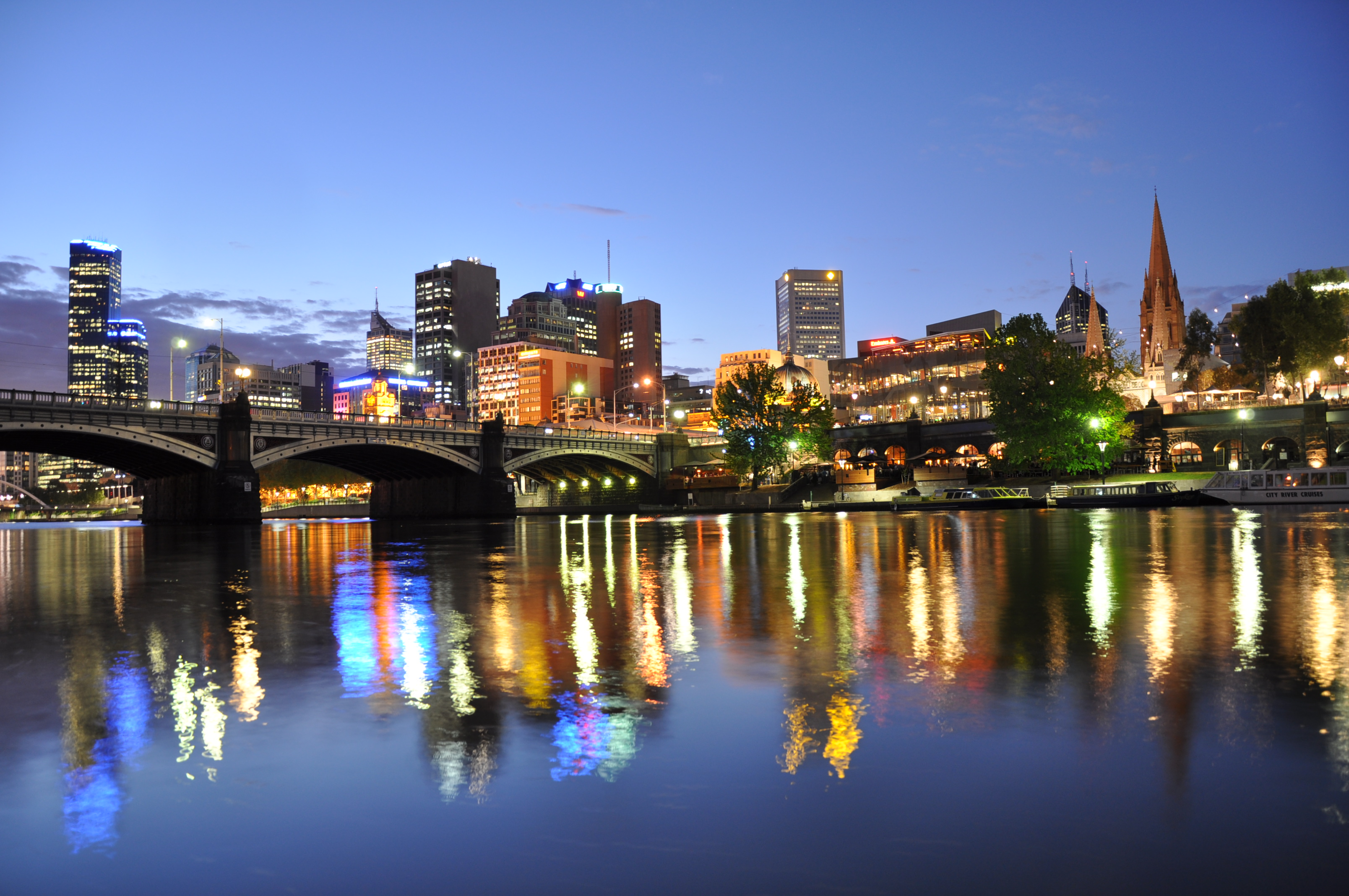
Princes Bridge and the Melbourne CBD from the Yarra River

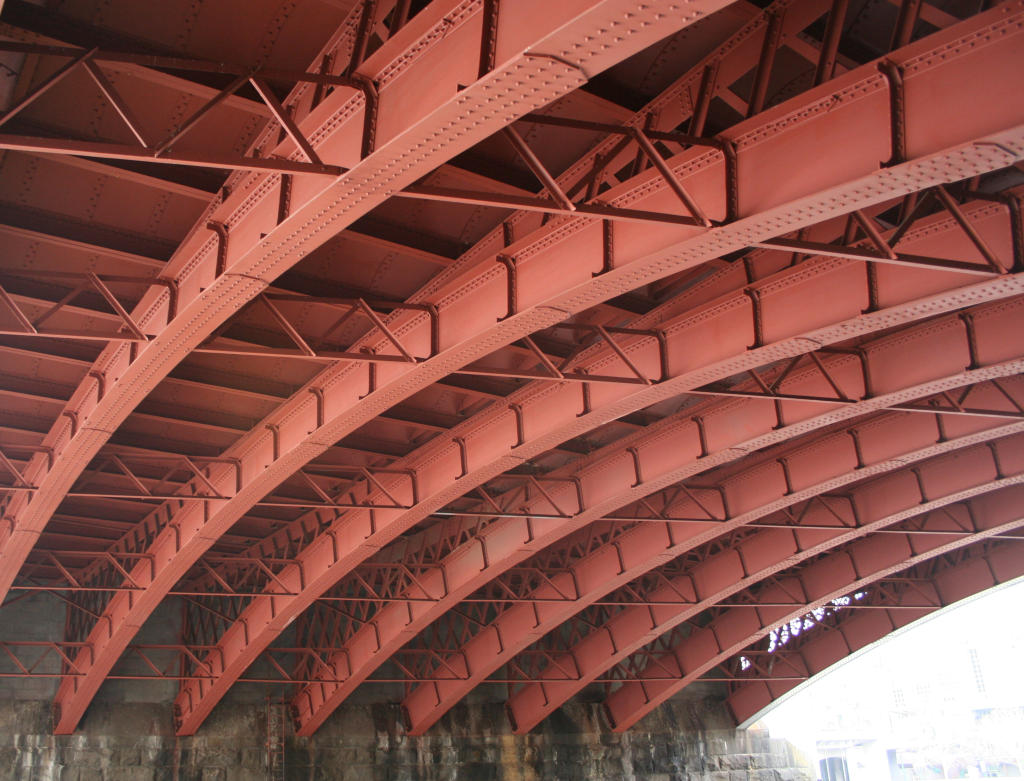
Underside of the iron girder arches

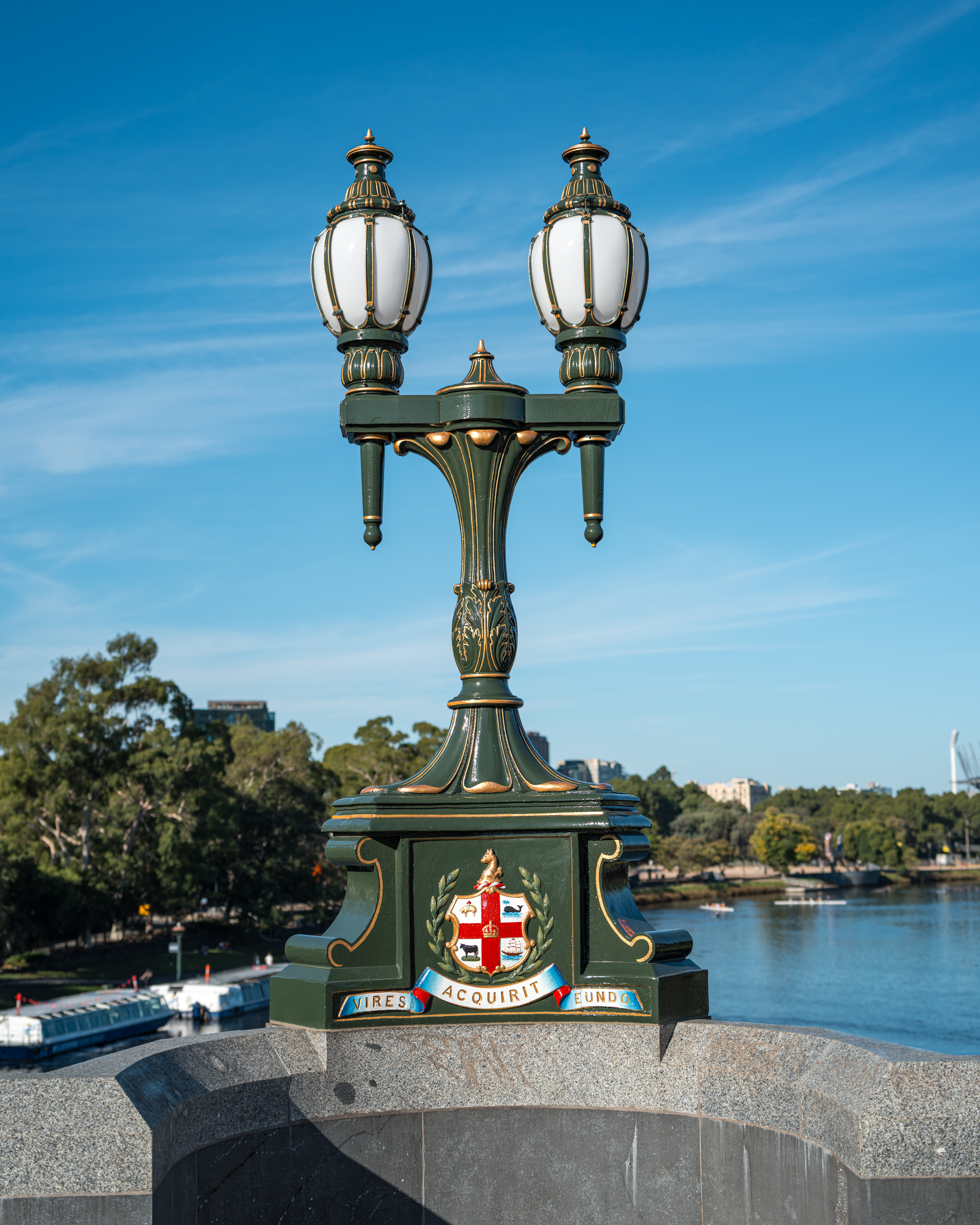
A lamp on the bridge

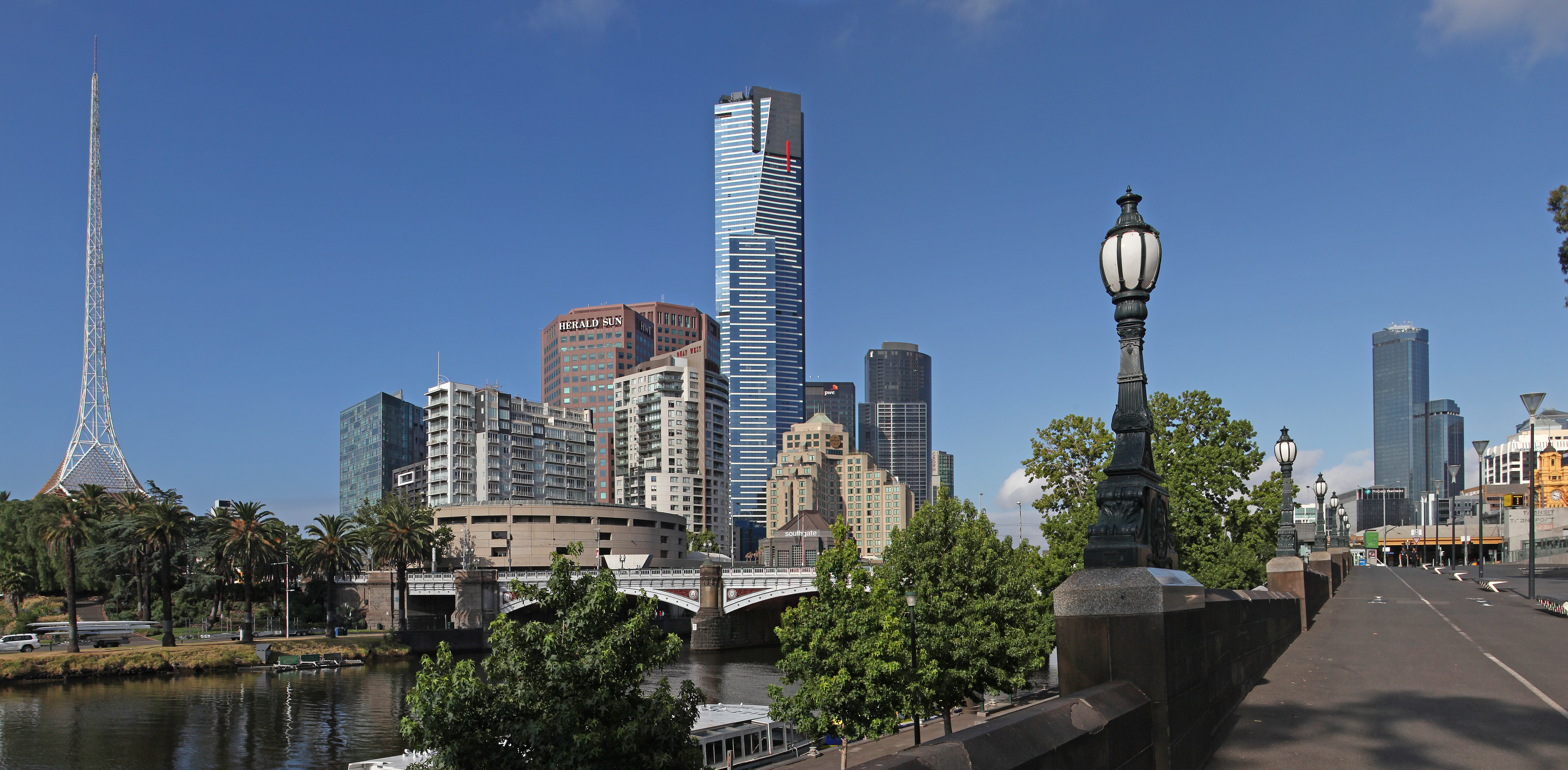
Southbank with Princes Bridge in the foreground

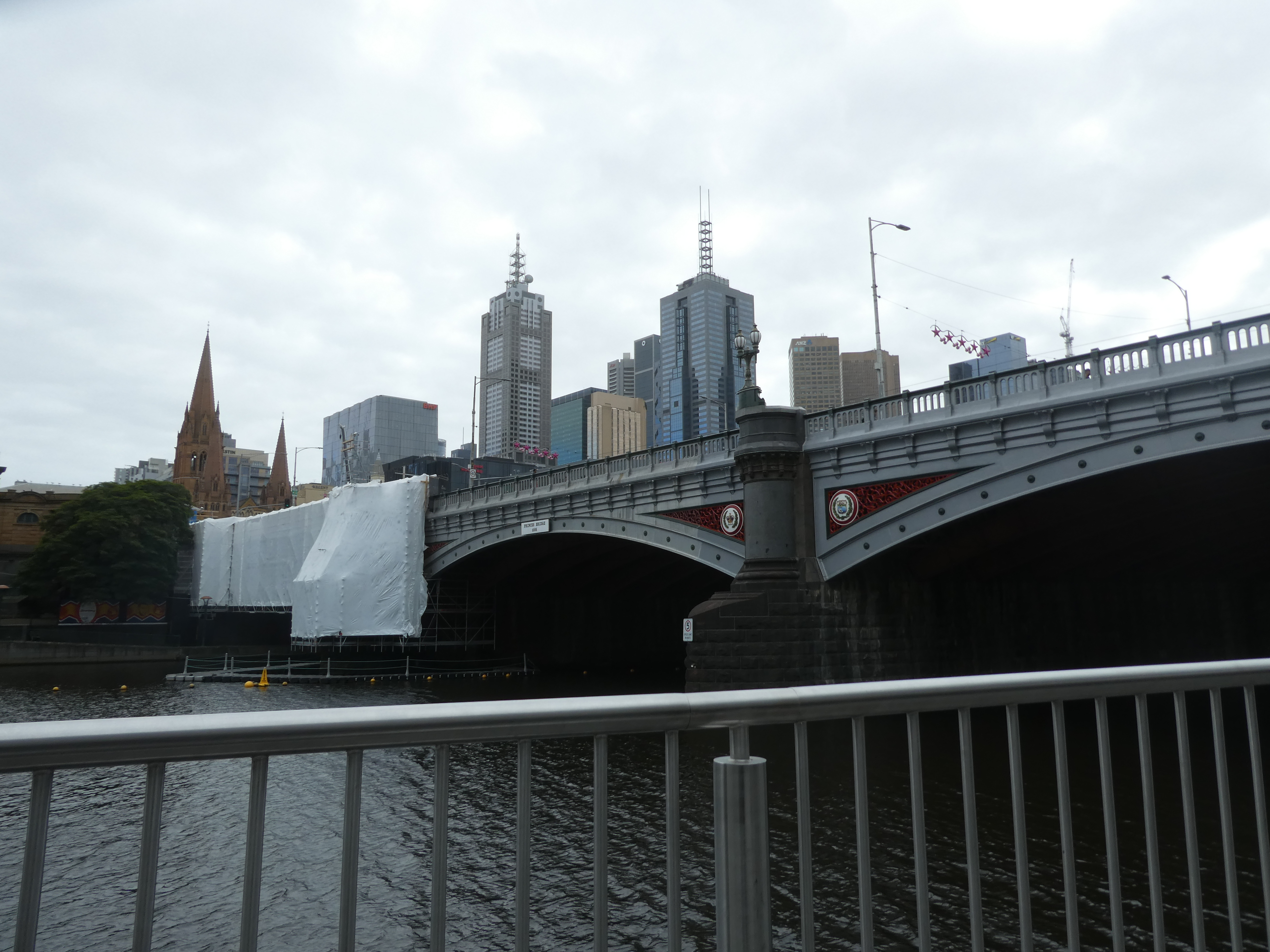
Restoration works, 2025

== See also ==
- Crossings of the Yarra River

== Notes ==
Next bridge upstream	Yarra River	Next bridge downstream
Swan Street Bridge (vehicles; pedestrians; cyclists)	Princes Bridge	Evan Walker Bridge (pedestrians; cyclists)
