= Harold Charles Richards =

Australian civil engineer

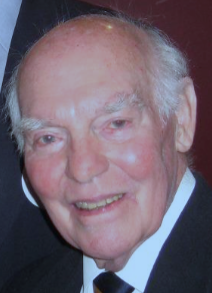
- Born: 17 November 1925; Melbourne, Victoria
- Died: 2 June 2014 (aged 88); Anglesea, Victoria
- Education: Royal Melbourne Institute of Technology
- Occupation: Civil engineer
- Employer: Hardcastle & Richards
- Known for: Contributions to engineering education, philanthropy
- Spouse: Joyce
- Children: Anthony, Margaret, Noel, Rosalie, Naomi

Harold Charles Richards (12 October 1925 – 2 June 2014) was an Australian civil engineer who co-founded the consulting engineering firm Hardcastle & Richards.

== Career ==
Harold Richards studied engineering at the Royal Melbourne Institute of Technology. In 1951, he worked in the Design Section of Johns and Waygood, which was responsible for many of Australia's post-war infrastructure developments. In 1952, he co-founded Hardcastle & Richards with business partner Roy Hardcastle, as a result of winning the design competition for the Olympic Stadium for the 1956 Melbourne Olympic Games. However, a change in government caused the cancellation of the project. The firm expanded to have offices in Melbourne, Perth, Sydney, Brisbane and Broken Hill. The firm was involved in many civil engineering projects, including the King Street Bridge over the Yarra River. In 1962, Hardcastle & Richards were invited by the School of Engineering at the University of Melbourne to participate in guiding students' final year design projects. These projects were based on actual projects in which the firm had been involved. This association with engineering education lasted five decades.

Other positions held:

- Chairman of the Victorian Institute of Marine Science, 1994-1997
- Chairman of the Marine and Freshwater Research Institute, 1997-1998
- Member of the Board of Management, Greenvale Centre and Mount Royal Hospital, 1990-1991
- President Emeritus, Broadmeadows College of TAFE, 1989-1993
- Elder, St John's Uniting Church in Australia, 1977-2014
- Councillor, Shire of Bulla, 1965-1985
- President, Shire of Bulla, 1972
- President of the Association of Consulting Engineers Australia, 1977-1980
- Vice-President of the Australian College of Professions, 1975
- National Vice-President, Institution of Engineers Australia, 1973-1975
- Member of the National Capital Planning Committee, 1973-1978
- Member of Board of Management, North West Hospital, Melbourne, 1991-1995

== Philanthropy ==
For almost 50 years, Hardcastle & Richards were major donors to the School of Engineering at the University of Melbourne and to RMIT University. In 1979, a bronze relief by artist Michael Meszaros, entitled Compression and Tension was presented to the Department of Civil Engineering to mark the 25th anniversary of the founding of the firm. Richards was the founder of the Rotary Club of Carlton in 1985 and its Charter President.

== Honours ==
- Member of the Order of Australia, 1980, for service to technical education
- Honorary Associate Professor, Department of Civil and Environmental Engineering, University of Melbourne
- Elected Fellow, Institution of Engineers Australia
- Paul Harris Fellow, Rotary International, 1995
- Honorary Life Member, Rotary Club of Carlton, 2013
