= Bruce Day =

Bruce Day may refer to:

- Bruce Day (musician)
- Bruce Day (engineer)
