= Evan Walker Bridge =

Footbridge across the Yarra River in Melbourne, Australia

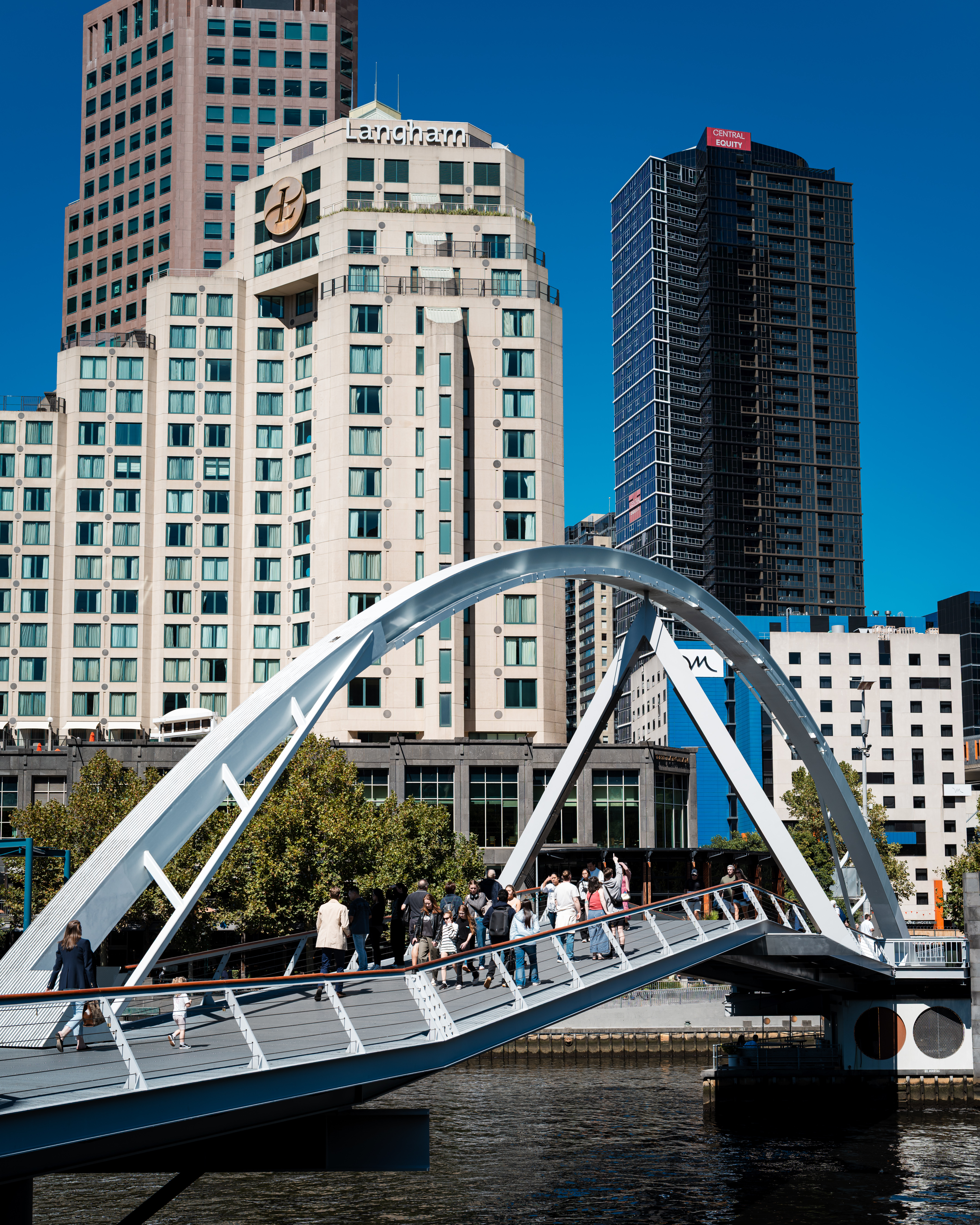
- The bridge, from the northern bank
- Coordinates: 37°49′11″S 144°57′54″E
- Carries: Pedestrians; bicycles (shared use)
- Crosses: Yarra River
- Locale: Melbourne, Victoria, Australia
- Begins: Melbourne city centre
- Ends: Southbank
- Other names: Southbank Pedestrian Bridge (1990—2015); Love Lock Bridge [colq.] (2012—2015)
- Named for: Evan Walker AO (since 2015)
- Maintained by: City of Melbourne
- Preceded by: Princes Bridge
- Followed by: Sandridge Bridge

Characteristics
- Design: Tied-arch bridge
- Material: Steel
- Longest span: 45 metres (148 ft)

General information
- Opened: March 1990; 36 years ago

Design and construction
- Architecture firm: Cocks Carmichael Whitford
- Structural engineer: Irwin Johnston & Partners
- Main contractor: Costain
- Awards and prizes: Walter Burley Griffin Award for Urban Design (1990); Enduring Architecture Award (2018)

Location
- Interactive map of Evan Walker Bridge

The Evan Walker Bridge is a shared use bicycle and pedestrian bridge across the Yarra River between Southbank and the city centre of Melbourne, Victoria, Australia.

== Background ==
In May 1980, The Age launched the "Give the Yarra a Go" campaign aimed at creating public awareness of the Yarra River landscape and to encourage bicycle and pedestrian paths on the banks of the Yarra River.

== Design and construction ==
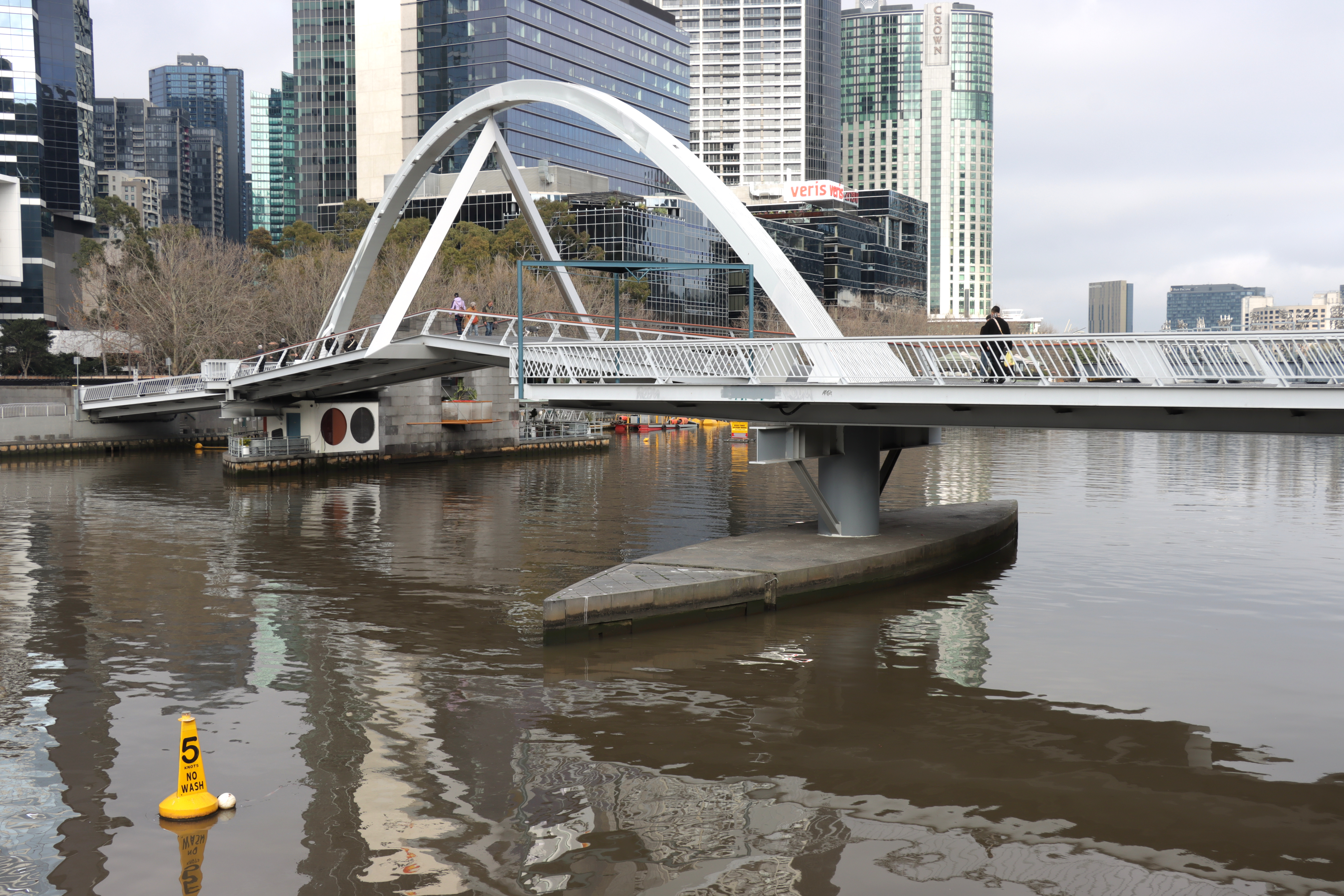
Evan Walker Bridge looking south-west with the 'Ponyfish Island' bar visible underneath.

In February–March 1986, a design competition was held for a pedestrian bridge to link Flinders Street station and Flinders Walk with Southbank Promenade. Selected architects included local and international firms. The winning entry featured a steel tied-arch form, designed by Cocks, Carmicheal & Whitford. The project team consisted of Robert Troup, Peter Carmichael and John Wardle working in association with the Public Works Department and the Victorian Ministry for Planning and Environment. The civil and structural engineers were Irwin Johnston & Partners. Costain was the builder.

In an 1987 industry journal, the firm discussed their design:

"The significance of the river in the ordering of the southern city edge of the CBD and the intention to implement major river edge works of an urban character in this section of the river were seen to be the major design determinates.

The inherent differences between a bridge specifically designed for pedestrians and one that is primarily a vehicular bridge was explored, as was the presence of the existing bridges and their contribution to the river environment in this precinct.

The bridge design, as well as fulfilling its primary role as a means for people to cross the river, allows a further opportunity for it to become a passive recreational resource, a place on the river.

The configuration is of two jetties orthogonal to the river banks linked by a diagonal central span supported by an arch that is itself diagonal to the span. This is deliberate, accentuating the considerable lateral distance the bridge must accommodate to reach its respective landing points.

From the Southbank, direct views across the river are denied by a bluestone wall, rising sheer from the island below. The island is seen as a fragment of the nearby bank, complete with a tree notionally displaced from the Southbank landscaping.

Leaving the northwalk, the views are virtually unrestricted with the end of this section given over to a covered seating area isolated from the main foot traffic. A pylon loosely modelled on a rowing shell, a familiar form on this part of the river, supports this northern jetty and forms the springing point of the arch over the central span.

The arch, a traditional bridge form, supports the raking walkway at the midpoint on a steel triangle, a simple form that modestly attempts to establish a presence against a busy urban skyline.

At night two elements, the arch and the tree will be strongly illuminated and the rest of the bridge kept in relative darkness. The intention is that the seemingly inadequate dimension of the arch and the displaced tree reflected in the dark waters of the river will give the bridge a somewhat surreal quality."

== Opening and reception ==
The bridge was opened as the Southbank Pedestrian Bridge during Moomba 1990. In November 1998, conservation architect Peter Lovell described it as 'one of the largely unrecognised architectural gems of Melbourne', calling it 'a beautifully designed and engineered structure which is a pleasure to use and view.' In 1990 the project was awarded the Walter Burley Griffin Award for Urban Design. The bridge was later awarded the 2018 Enduring Architecture Award at the Victorian Architecture Awards, 28 years after its opening.

== Riverside bar/cafe ==
On 23 January 1999, politician and entrepreneur Clem Newton-Brown opened the "Clem Cafe" nestled below the Southbank Pedestrian Bridge. It came after three years and many planning applications to the City of Melbourne, who ultimately supported his idea but warned that rising water flooded the area in winter. Then other logistical challenges began; how to dispose of wastewater and how to transport furnishings onto the concrete platform. Solutions came in the form of salvage tanks for waste and barges for transport. The cafe is shaped like the bow of a ship so that when the Yarra River rises, the waters part on either side of its waterproof panelling. Engineers and the bridge's original team of architects were consulted on the cafe's design, who recommended it be bolted to the concrete platform beneath the bridge. Prior to the development, the space was an unofficial skateboarding spot. In 2010, Grant Smillie, Jerome Borazio and Andrew Mackinnon re-opened the venue as Pony Fish Island, which became an instant success as well as a permanent addition to the Melbourne hospitality scene. It was named in part after the mythical Ponyfish seen in the cult film ‘A Life Aquatic’.

== Love Locks project ==
Between 2012 and 2015, the bridge was known colloquially as Love Lock Bridge — due to thousands of padlocks being attached to the railings. The City of Melbourne, which maintains the bridge, cited "a concern about the integrity of the bridge" and announced plans to remove the padlocks as part of routine maintenance. Lord Mayor Robert Doyle said in May 2015: "There are now 20,000 locks on that bridge and the wires are starting to sag and in some places because of that sag locks are being placed over two wires together". Doyle also said it was estimated up to 40,000 keys had been thrown into the river, posing a risk to the environment. The locks would not be cut off, but slid off the support wires, which would be detached from the bridge and replaced.

The padlocks were given to six artists, who used them as materials to create love-themed artworks. These artworks were displayed at Melbourne Town Hall in 2016 before being raffled for charity. A City of Melbourne spokesperson described the Love Locks Project as a "one-off artistic initiative" created in response to the large number of locks removed at the time. The spokesperson explained that small numbers of locks are routinely removed by City of Melbourne officers to "preserve the structural integrity of the bridge."

== Naming ==
On 28 July 2015, the bridge was officially renamed in honour of the late Evan Walker AO, a former planning minister who was integral to the development of Melbourne's Southbank precinct, dubbed the "father of Southbank".

== See also ==
- Crossings of the Yarra River

Next bridge upstream	Yarra River	Next bridge downstream
Princes Bridge (trams; vehicles; pedestrians; cyclists)	Evan Walker Bridge	Sandridge Bridge (pedestrians; cyclists)
