= Queens Bridge (Melbourne) =

Bridge in Melbourne, Victoria, Australia

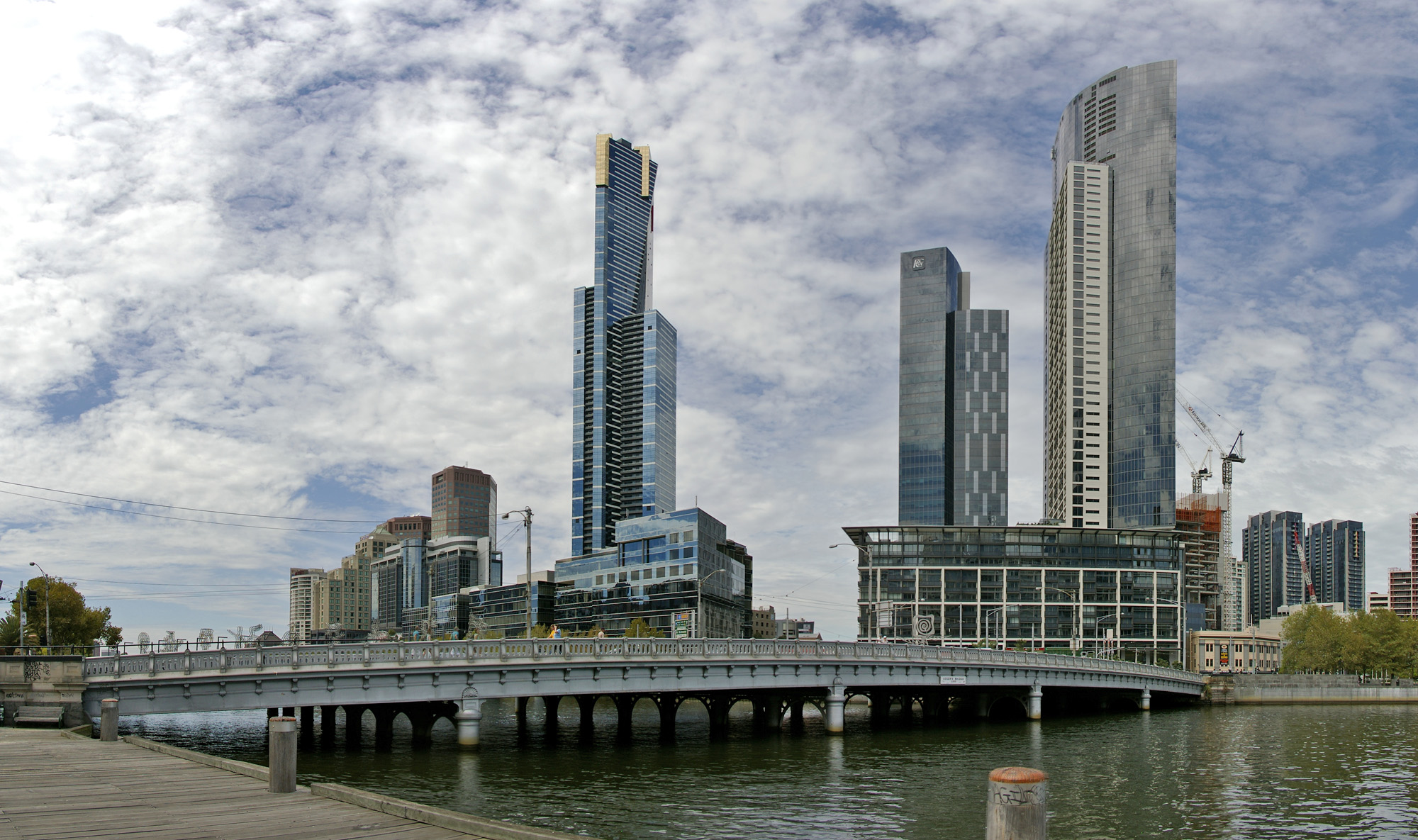
- Coordinates: 37°49′14″S 144°57′41″E
- Carries: Vehicles; trams; pedestrians; cyclists
- Crosses: Yarra River
- Locale: Melbourne, Victoria, Australia
- Official name: Queen's Bridge
- Named for: Queen Victoria
- Preceded by: Sandridge Bridge
- Followed by: King Street Bridge

Characteristics
- Design: Arch bridge
- Material: Wrought iron plate girders
- Total length: 96 m (314 ft)
- Width: 30 m (99 ft)
- No. of spans: 5
- Piers in water: 4

History
- Designer: Frederick M. Hynes
- Constructed by: David Munro
- Built: 1887–1889
- Opened: 18 April 1890; 136 years ago
- Replaces: Falls Bridge

Victorian Heritage Register
- Official name: Queens Bridge
- Type: Registered place
- Designated: 20 August 1982
- Reference no.: H1448
- Heritage overlay no.: HO791
- Category: Transport - Road

Register of the National Estate
- Official name: Queen's Bridge
- Type: Defunct register
- Designated: 21 March 1978
- Reference no.: 5195

Location
- Interactive map of Queens Bridge

The Queens Bridge (officially the Queen's Bridge) is a flat arch road bridge across the Yarra River, located in the city centre of Melbourne, in Victoria, Australia. The bridge was opened in 1889, and consists of five wrought iron plate girder spans.

The bridge was added to the Victorian Heritage Register on 20 August 1982 in recognition of its architectural, aesthetic and historical importance; and on 21 March 1978, the bridge was added to the now defunct Register of the National Estate.

== History ==
The bridge was constructed by contractor David Munro and replaced a timber bridge built in 1860.

The bridge is a very flat arch, and has five spans constructed of wrought iron plate girders. The bridge rests on iron cylinders in groups of eight, filled with concrete, with arched bracing between. It connects Market Street and William Street on the north bank to Queensbridge Street to the south. Trams on route 58 also cross the bridge.

In 1910, Houdini leapt from the bridge while shackled, and escaped in less than a minute.

== Yarra Falls ==
Queens Bridge is situated at the location of the Yarra Falls, a waterfall that had existed on the Yarra River. The Aboriginal clans of Woiwurrung and Boon wurrung called the falls "Yarro Yarro," which means "it flows" or "ever-flowing" and used it as a crossing point between their lands.

In June 1835, John Batman arrived at Yarra Falls and recognised the surrounding land as a good site to build a village. The site became the landing spot for ships in Melbourne, because the falls had prevented ships from travelling further upstream, which influenced the overall design of Melbourne.

In 1839, a dam was built on the falls, using convict labour, in order to secure the fresh water supply for the growing city. However, it did not last long, nor did its replacement. In 1845, a bridge was built at the site by a private company, but that was replaced by a government-funded Princes Bridge in 1850, which stood until the removal of the Falls.

== See also ==
- Crossings of the Yarra River

Next crossing upstream	Yarra River	Next crossing downstream
Sandridge Bridge (pedestrians; cyclists)	Queens Bridge	King Street Bridge (vehicles; pedestrians; cyclists)
