= Sandridge Bridge =

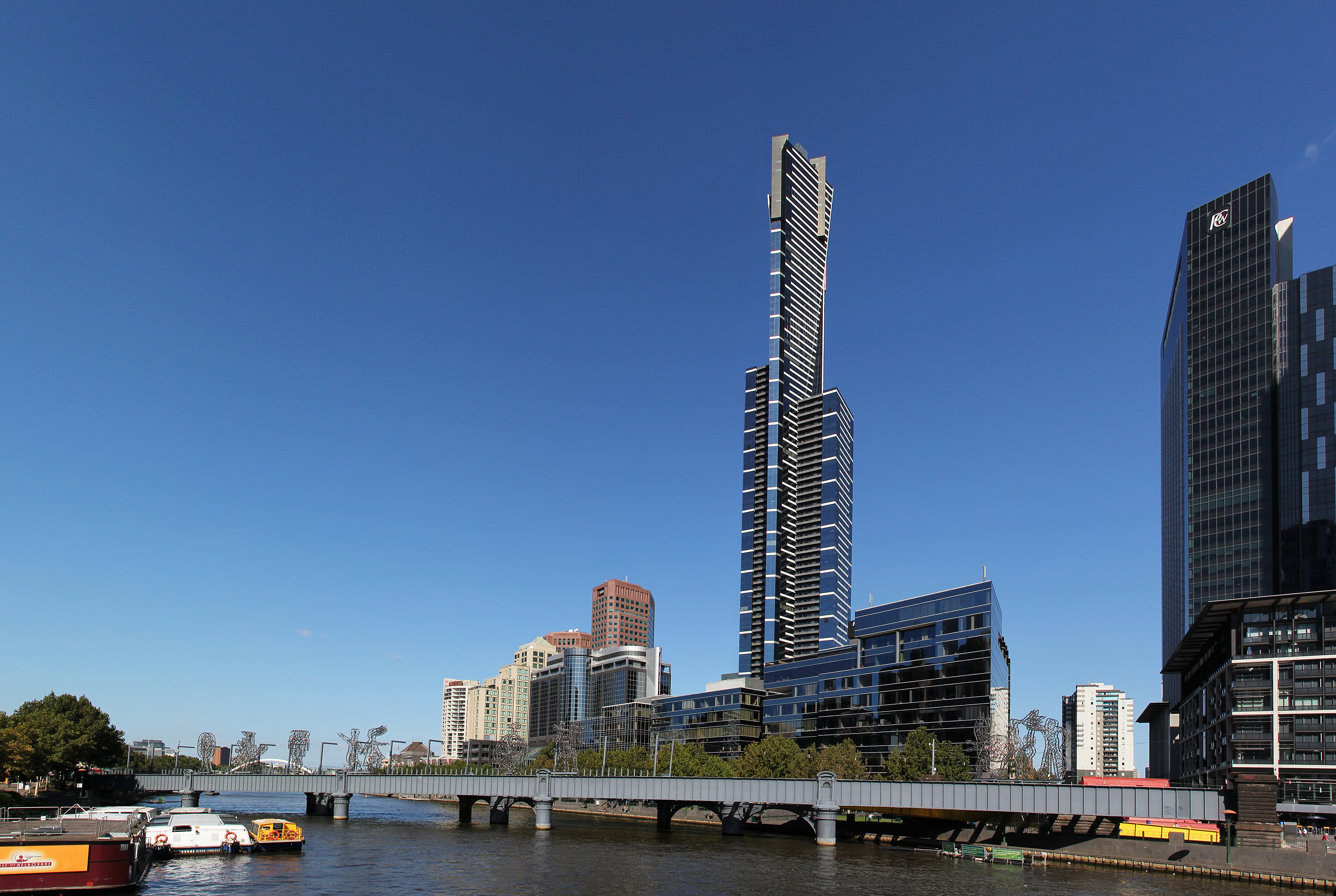
- Coordinates: 37°49′13″S 144°57′45″E
- Carries: Pedestrians, cyclists (since 2006); – (1987–c. 2006); – Port Melbourne and St Kilda lines (1888–1987)
- Crosses: Yarra River
- Locale: Melbourne, Victoria, Australia
- Begins: Melbourne city centre
- Ends: Southbank
- Preceded by: Evan Walker Bridge
- Followed by: Queens Bridge

Characteristics
- Design: Girder bridge
- Material: Steel
- Total length: 178.4 m (585 ft)
- Width: 17 m (56 ft)
- Longest span: 36.9 m (121 ft)
- No. of spans: 5
- Piers in water: 3?

Rail characteristics
- No. of tracks: 4 (since removed)
- Track gauge: Standard gauge
- Electrified: 1920s

History
- Designer: Victorian Railways
- Contracted lead designer: David Munro
- Built: 1886-1888
- Construction cost: A$18.5 million (2006)
- Opened: 1888; 138 years ago
- Rebuilt: 2006
- Replaces: Timber trestle bridge (1858)

Victorian Heritage Register
- Official name: Sandridge Railway Line Bridge
- Type: Registered place
- Designated: 25 November 1993
- Reference no.: H0994
- Heritage overlay no.: HO762
- Category: Transport - Rail

Location
- Interactive map of Sandridge Bridge

The Sandridge Bridge is a steel girder bridge across the Yarra River, located in inner-city Melbourne, in Victoria, Australia. Completed in 1888, as the third bridge on the site, the bridge used to carry railway lines and, in 2006, was redeveloped as a pedestrian and cycle path, featuring public art. The 178-metre-long (584 ft) bridge runs diagonally to the river and is one of the bridges that connects the Melbourne city centre with Southbank.

The bridge was added to the Victorian Heritage Register on 25 November 1993 in recognition of its historical, technical and architectural significance.

== History ==
=== First bridges ===
The first bridge was built in 1853 for the Melbourne and Hobson's Bay Railway Company Port Melbourne railway line, which ran from Flinders Street to what was then known as Sandridge, now Port Melbourne, on Hobsons Bay, Port Phillip. It was the first railway in Australia to operate with steam locomotives. In 1857, the St Kilda railway line was opened, which ran parallel with the Sandridge line across the bridge.

The original bridge was replaced in 1858 by a timber trestle bridge carrying two tracks with the tight curve of the original railway removed by rebuilding the bridge on a more oblique angle, as seen today.

=== Current bridge ===
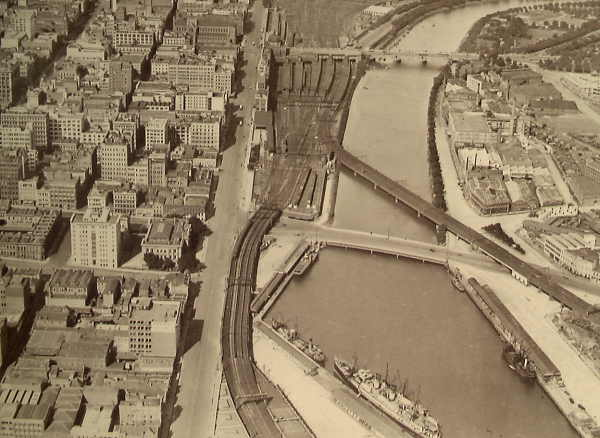
Sandbridge Bridge c. 1927 - it is the middle bridge

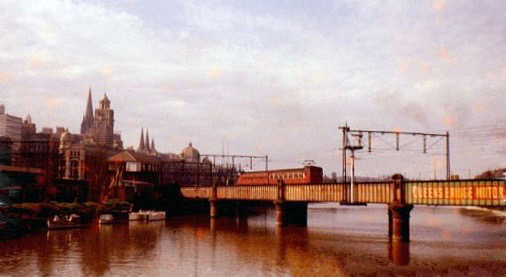
Train crossing the bridge, 1959

The current bridge was designed by the Victorian Railways and the construction contract was let to David Munro & Co in 1886, the four-track bridge opening for traffic in 1888. The actual junction of the Port Melbourne and St Kilda lines was at Flinders Street, with the two pairs of tracks running parallel until Clarendon Street, where the St Kilda line diverged south. Constructed at a 33-degree angle to the river bank, it was one of the first railway structures in Melbourne to use steel girders rather than iron, and the workforce included a young engineering student, John Monash. On either side of the river, the steel girders were supported by bluestone and brick buttresses and, on the south side, the structure continued as a brick viaduct. In the 1920s, overhead electrical stanchions were added as part of the electrification of the line, and the original timber deck was replaced with rail and concrete slabs.

The use of the bridge by the Port Melbourne and St Kilda railway lines ceased in 1987, when both lines were converted to light rail. There were proposals for the light rail lines to continue over the Sandridge Bridge into Flinders Street station, but they were diverted from the railway reserve at Clarendon Street and run into the city via Spencer Street. The light rail lines operate today as the route 96 tram to St Kilda, and route 109 tram to Port Melbourne.

The viaduct over Queensbridge Street and the embankment across the South Bank were listed by the National Trust and were noted as being historically significant, but were removed. Only the bridge over the river itself was retained, with a number of different redevelopment plans proposed during the 1990s.

== Redevelopment ==
In 2001, the Victorian Government held an expressions of interest process for refurbishment of the bridge, seeking commercial involvement. However, the process was unsuccessful and, in 2003, the Melbourne City Council and the Department of Sustainability and Environment took over. They committed $15.5 million to restore the bridge, create a plaza on the Southbank side, and make connections to walkways on the Yarra north bank. In 2005, it was announced that artist Nadim Karam had been commissioned to create ten abstract sculptures in a group titled The Travellers, which represents the different types of immigrants who traditionally arrived by train over the bridge from Station Pier, Port Melbourne. Nine of the sculptures move across the bridge in a 15-minute sequence, travelling on bogies running between the two bridge spans.

The refurbished bridge was unveiled three days before the 2006 Commonwealth Games in Melbourne, at a final cost of $18.5 million. It included a new pedestrian and cycle path, and public space, connecting a new Queensbridge Square at Southbank to Flinders Walk on the north bank. However, only the eastern half of the bridge was reopened, the western half being stabilised and fenced off from public access.

On 11 June 2007, the bridge was vandalised when a sledgehammer was used to smash 46 of the 128 glass panels of the Travellers exhibit. Each glass panel offers information about Australian indigenous peoples or the countries of immigrants to Australia, from Afghanistan to Zimbabwe. It was expected to cost between A$200,000 and A$300,000 to repair and city councillors were considering using more durable materials to replace the glass.

In 2007, the project was awarded the Melbourne Prize by the Victorian Chapter of the Australian Institute of Architects, for its design and its contribution to the public life of Melbourne.

== Specifications ==
The bridge is 178.4 metres (585 ft) long and is made up of five spans, measuring in length, from the south bank to the north bank: 36.9 metres (121 ft), 36.6 metres (120 ft), 36.3 metres (119 ft), 36.9 metres (121 ft) and 31.7 metres (104 ft). The bridge is 17 metres (56 ft) wide and the girders are 2.74 metres (9 ft 0 in) high from the top to the bottom flange.

== Gallery ==
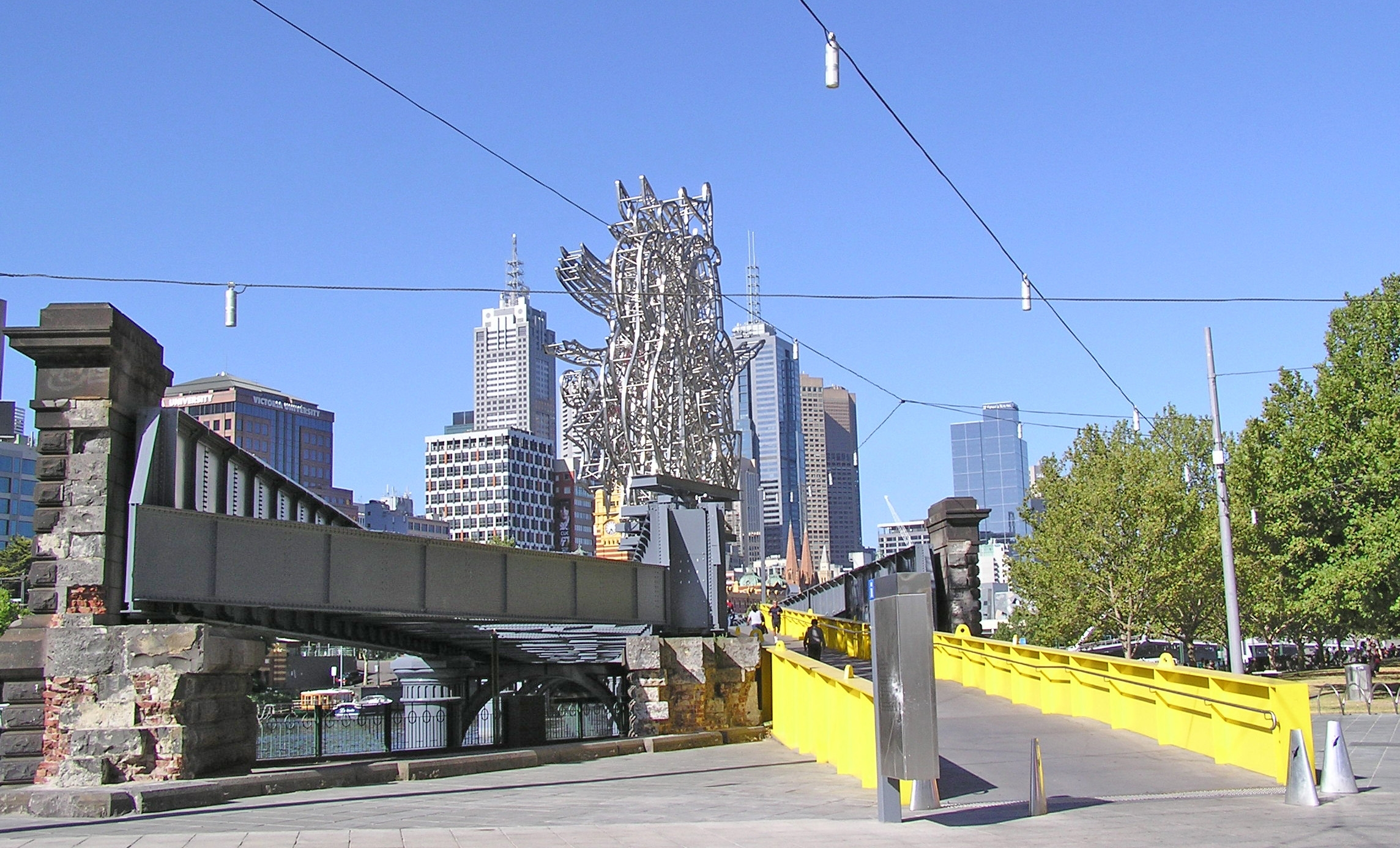
The bridge after redevelopment

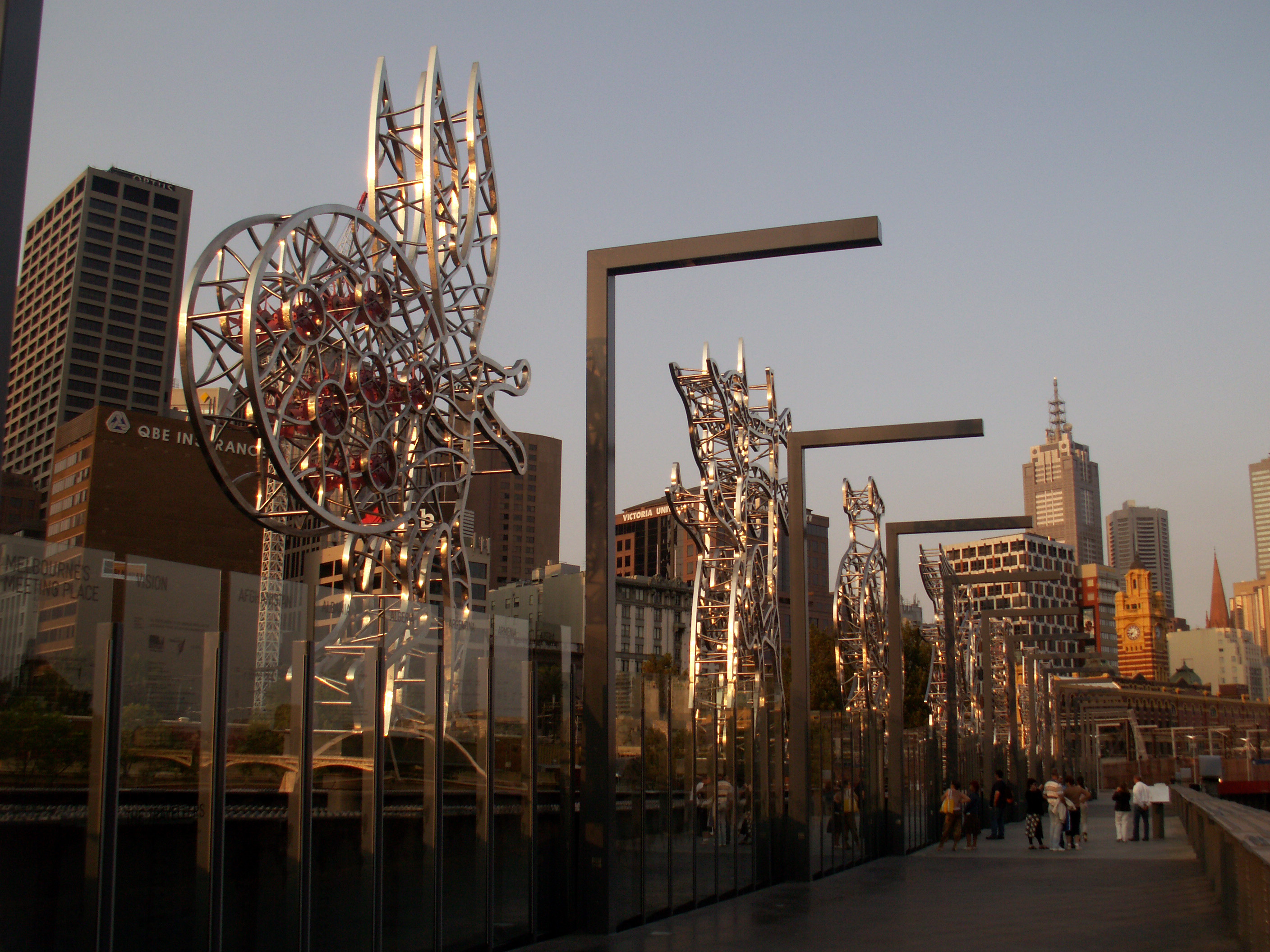
Sculptures on the Sandridge Bridge

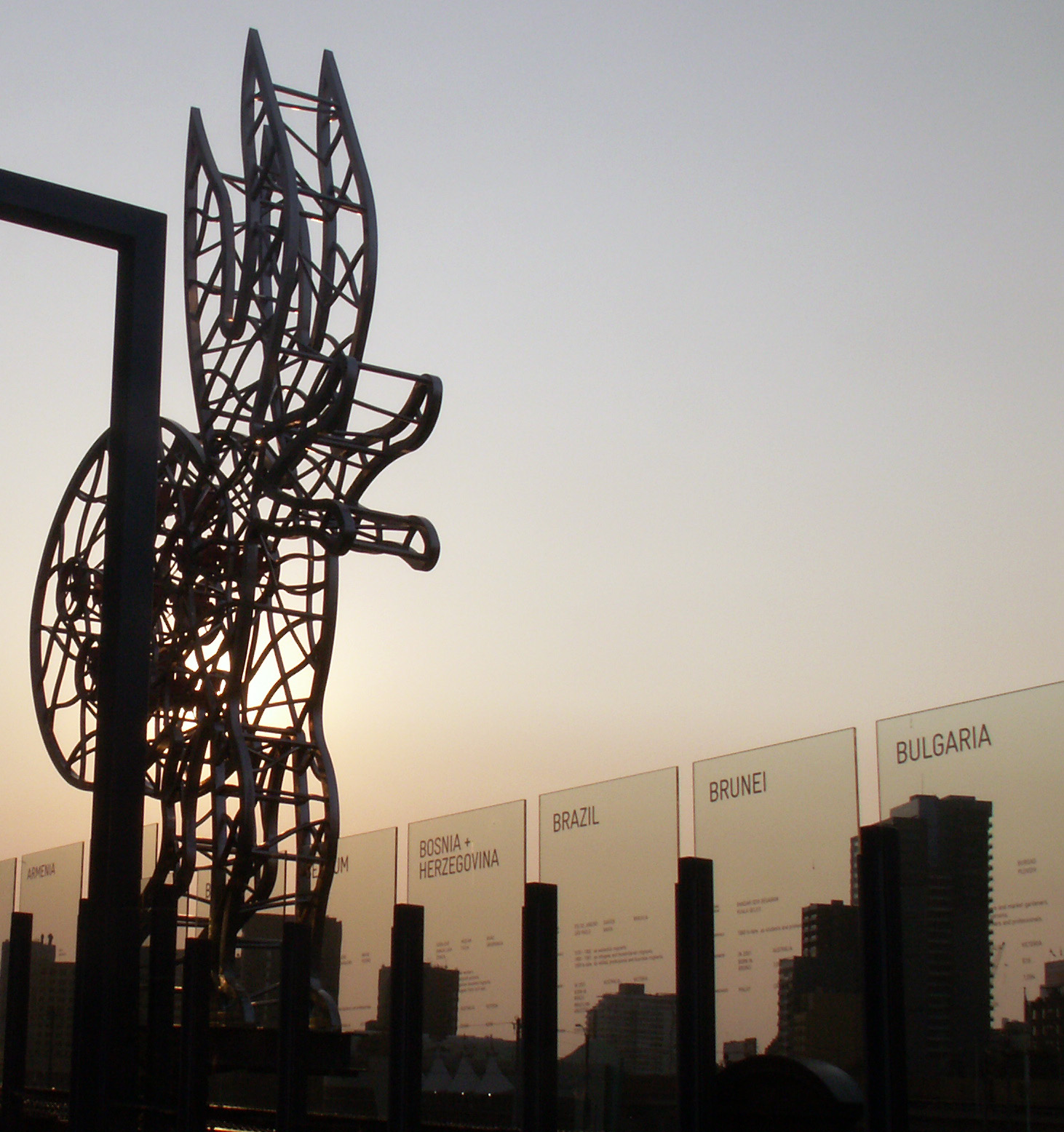
The glass panels contain information about each country from which immigrants came to Melbourne

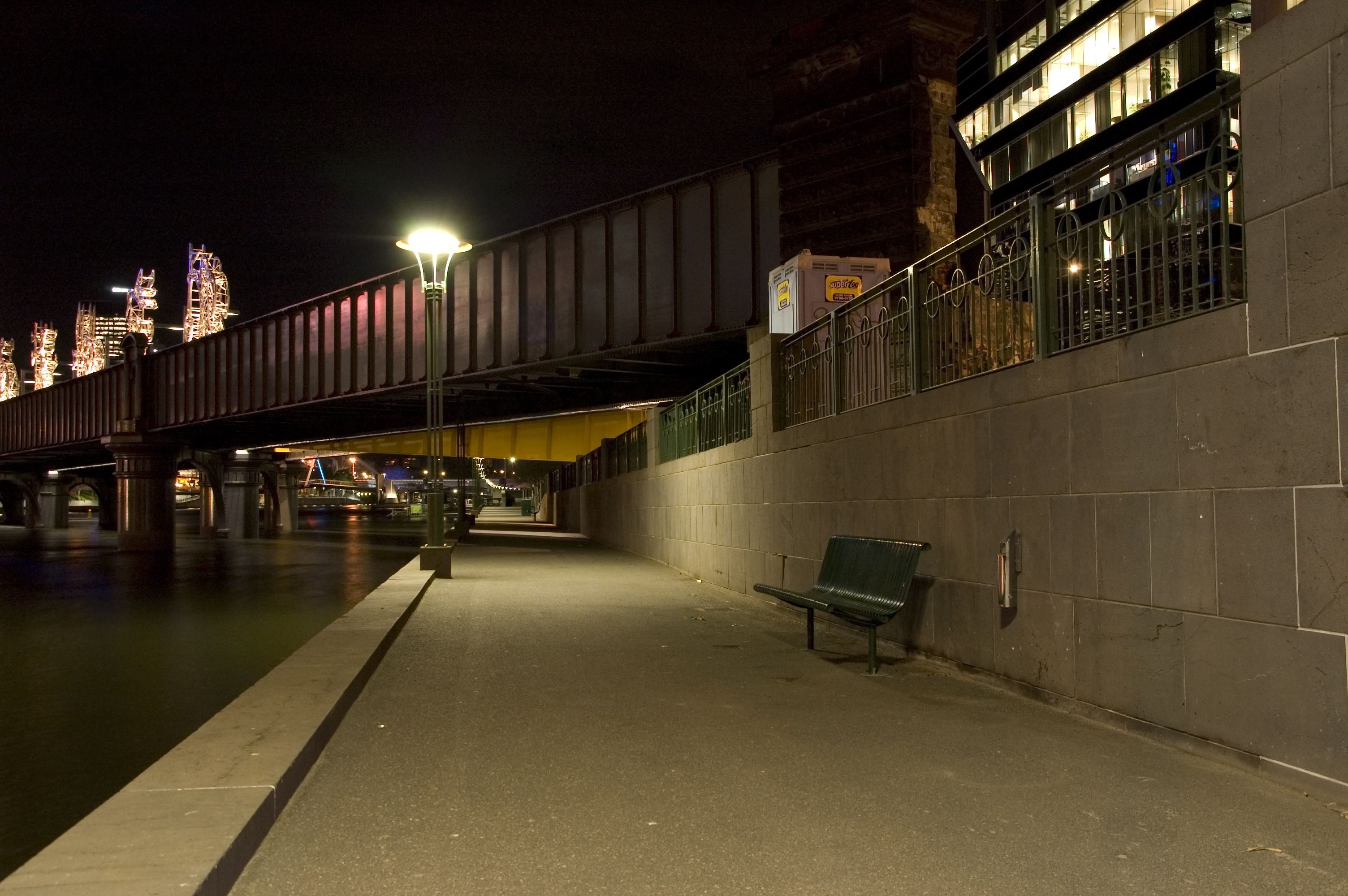
The bridge, viewed from the Southbank end

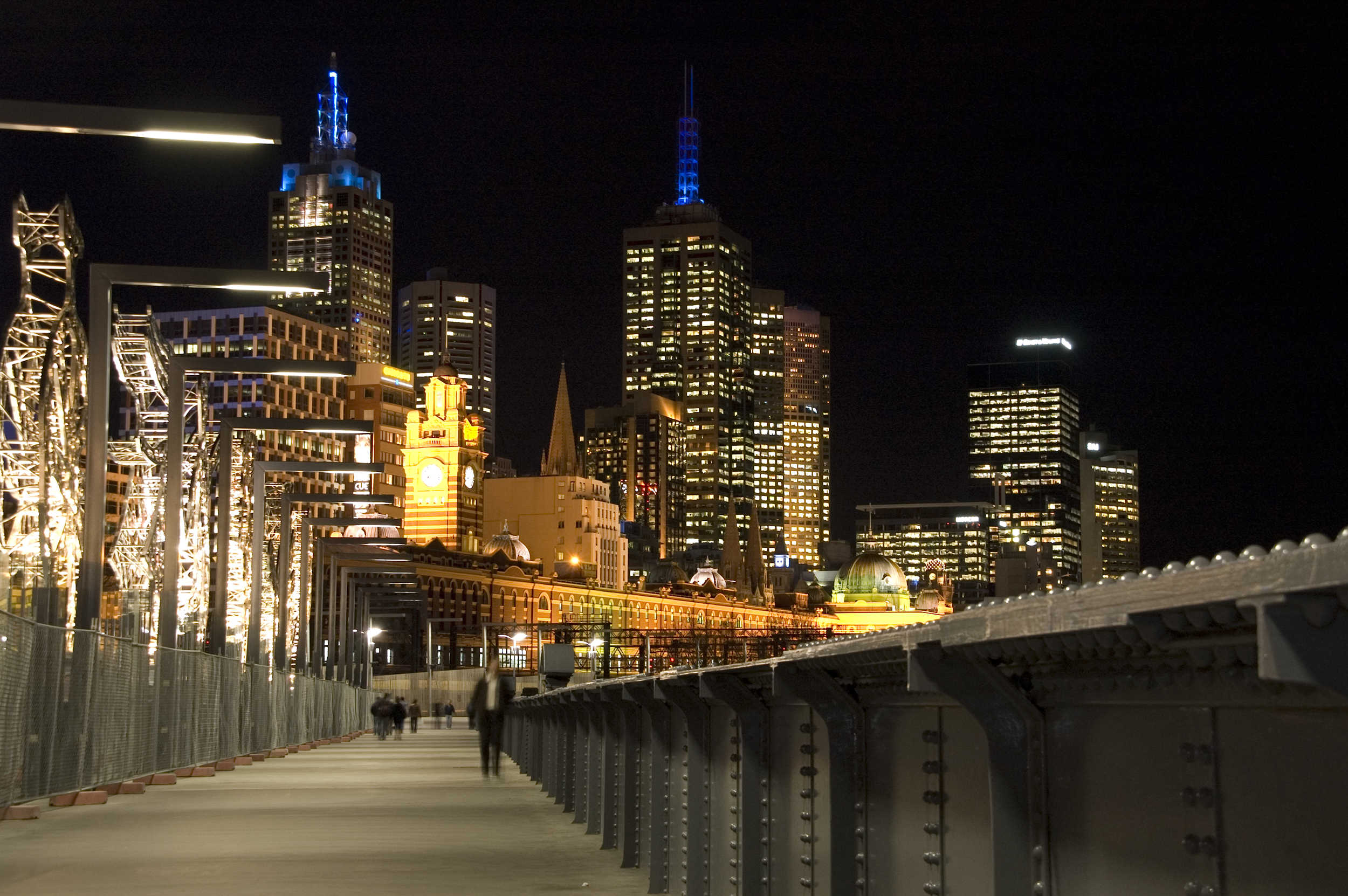
Vandalised glass panels, sectioned off behind temporary fencing

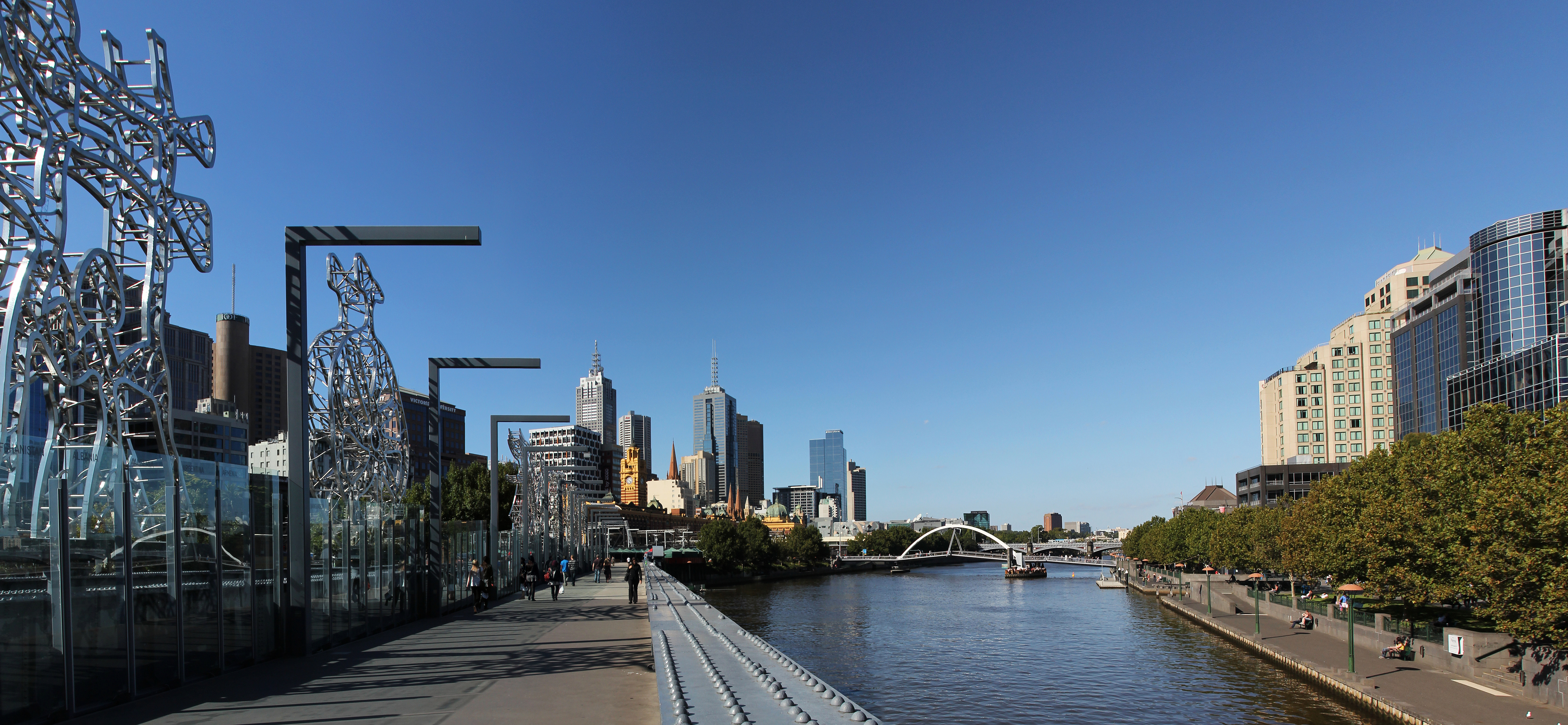
The bridge towards Flinders Street station

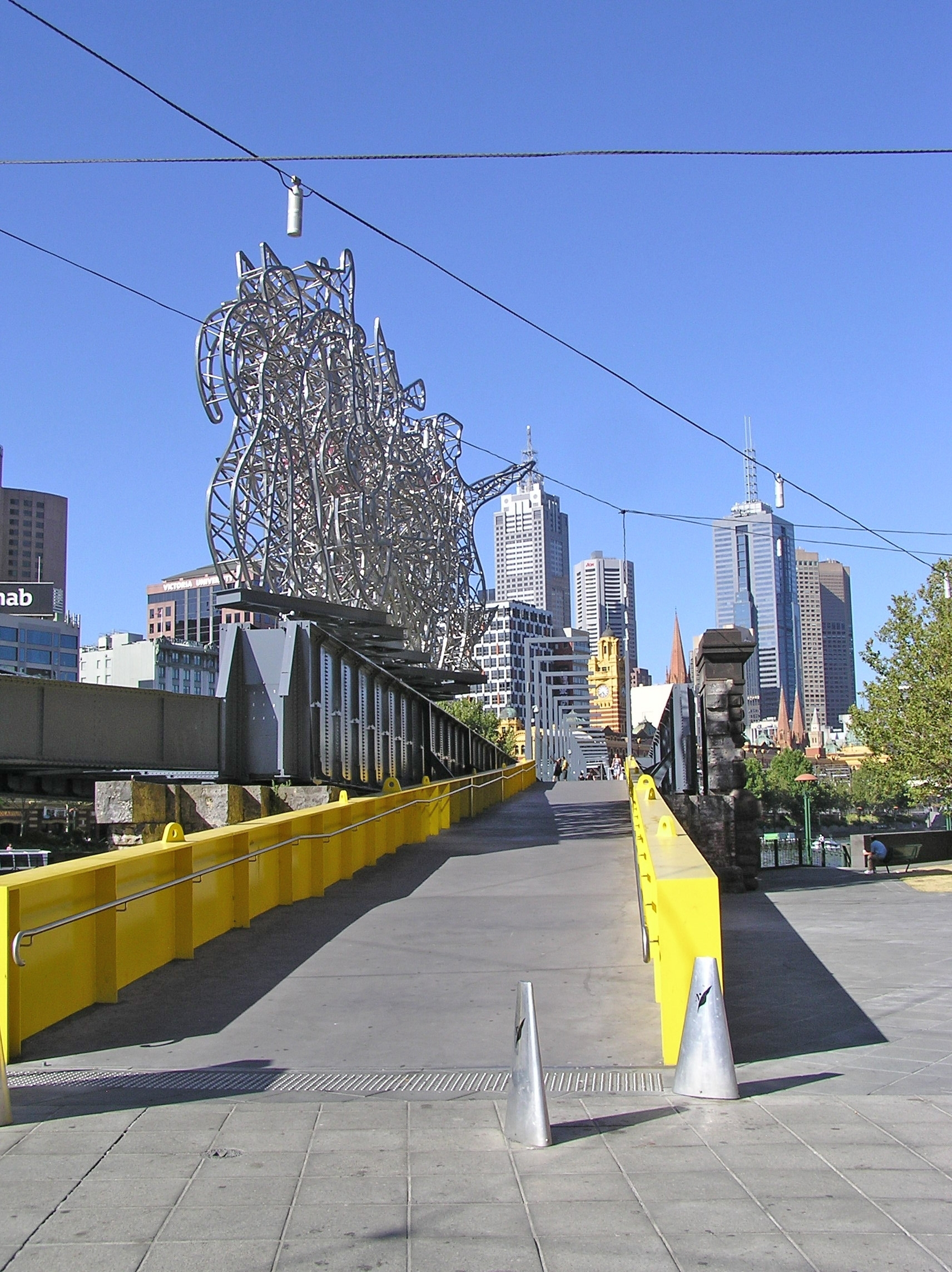
Looking over the bridge from the Southbank end towards the city centre

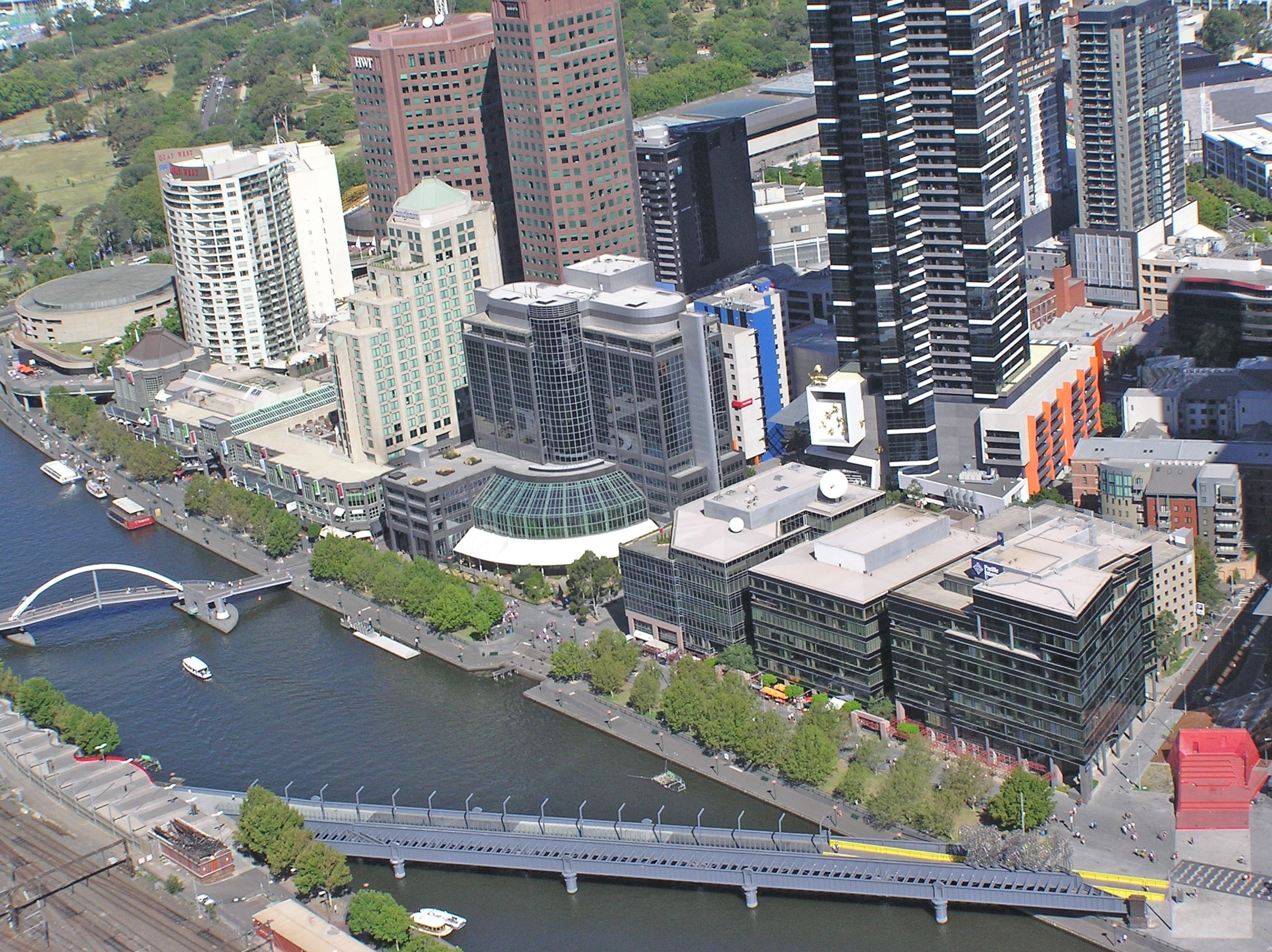
Aerial view of the bridge with the city centre, left, and Southbank, right

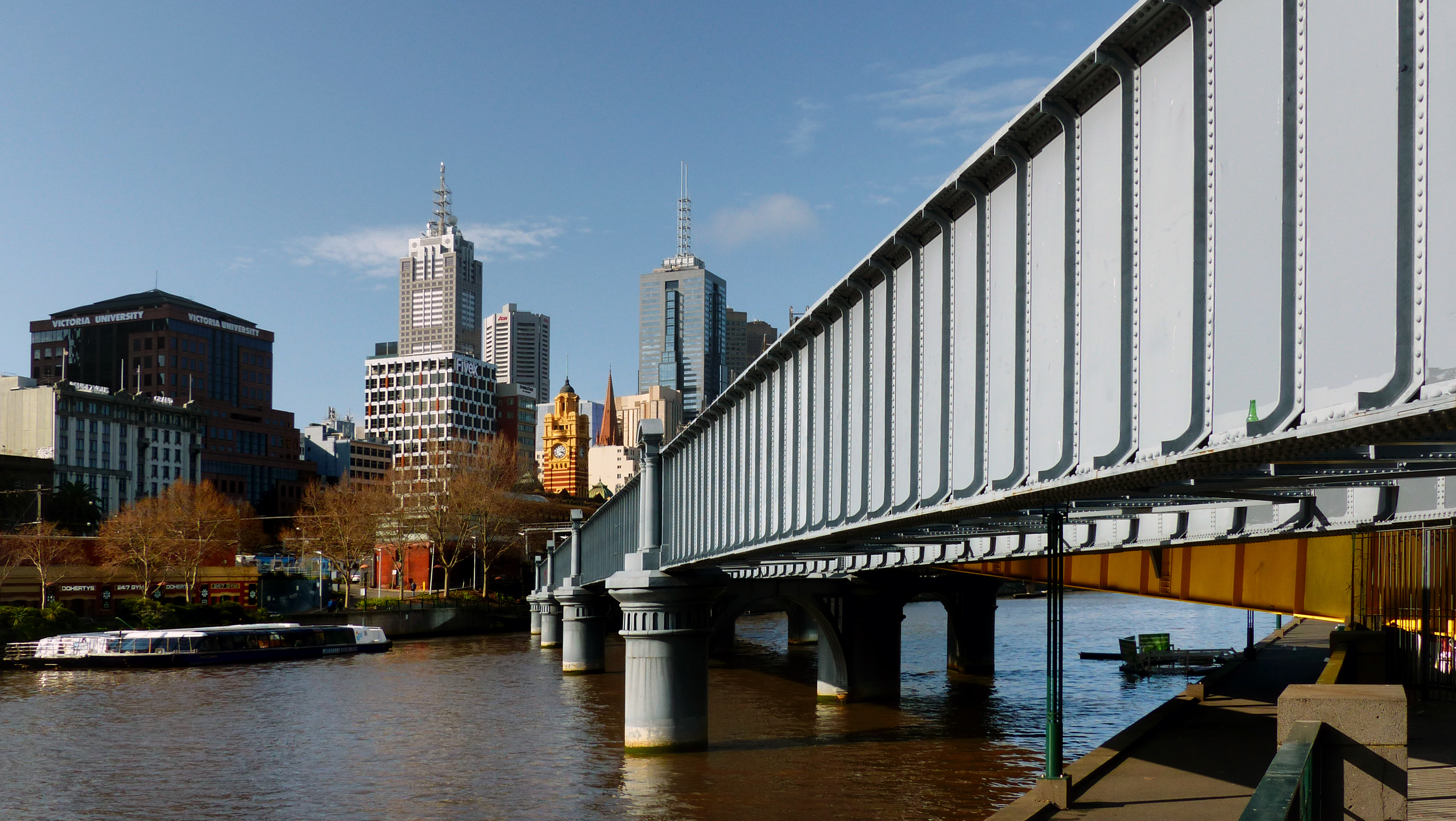
The bridge and piers, in 2015

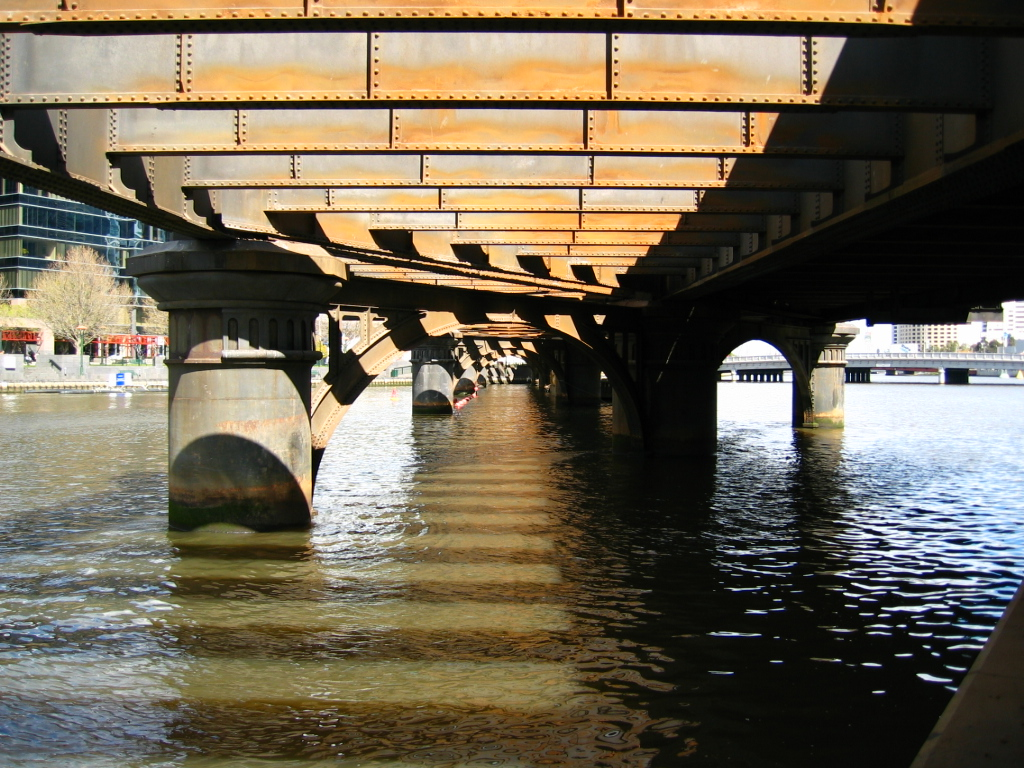
Underside of the bridge, 2003

== See also ==
- Crossings of the Yarra River

Next crossing upstream	Yarra River	Next crossing downstream
Evan Walker Bridge (pedestrian)	Sandridge Bridge	Queens Bridge (road)

Preceding station	Disused railways	Following station
Flinders Street	Port Melbourne line	Montague
Flinders Street	St Kilda line	South Melbourne
	List of closed railway stations in Melbourne	
