= Hardcastle & Richards =

Engineering company in Melbourne, Australia

Hardcastle & Richards Pty Ltd
- Type: Public
- Industry: Engineering and professional services consultancy; environmental management; design; project management
- Founder: Roy T. Hardcastle; Harold Charles Richards
- Headquarters: Melbourne, VIC, Australia
- Key people: Russell Smith(Managing Director)
- Products: Service
- Revenue: A$8.6m (2012)
- Number of employees: 130 (2012)

Hardcastle & Richards Pty Ltd (1952 - ?) (H&R) is a consulting engineering company which was established by Roy T. Hardcastle AO and Harold Charles Richards AM in Melbourne, Victoria, Australia in 1952.

== Origin ==
Both Roy Hardcastle (who obtained his BCE at the University of Melbourne in 1948) and Harold Richards were major contributors to the Melbourne School of Engineering, University of Melbourne for over 50 years as educators and donors as visiting alumni and in the case of Richards, Associate Professor. Their involvement began in 1962 when Richards recalled: ‘Professor Francis at the University invited us in 1962 to participate in his students’ final year projects...I think this was an industry first.’

== Philanthropy ==
Harold and Roy have been consistent donors to the School of Engineering. Harold also donated to International House, while Roy was a member of the University of Melbourne Committee of Convocation, and a regular attendee at Heritage Society events. Roy Hardcastle was awarded the Ray Tonkin Award by the Heritage Council of Victoria for volunteer services to heritage in Melbourne during National Heritage Week in April 2012, in recognition of more than 40 years of voluntary service to industrial and engineering heritage. Hardcastle was a member of the Government Building Advisory Council from 1972 and a founding member of the Historic Buildings Preservation Council in 1974, representing Engineers Australia until 1985.

== Takeover ==
The company was taken over by Dames & Moore in 1995 at a time it had grown to about 130 staff under Managing Director Russell Smith. At this time it had offices in Melbourne, Perth, Sydney, and Broken Hill, Australia, as well as operations in Jakarta, Indonesia and had net revenues of A$8.6 million. The firm was involved in '...multidisciplinary engineering and project management services for the mining, infrastructure and industrial markets plus offshore structural and process engineering for the oil and gas sector', However, the company had ceased by 2006 when it was last listed at 616 St Kilda Road, Melbourne. However, the Broken Hill division was taken over by the US URS Corporation and continues to operate serving the mining industry.

== Patents ==
The company holds patents for a Reciprocating feeder feed ejector and a Haulage system for pit mining.

== Projects ==
- Tharwa Bridge New South Wales, 1978.
- Sunbury Community Facilities, 1976.
- Ore Haulage Facilities at Z.C. Mines, Broken Hill 1988
- Noojee trestle bridge, 1989.
- Deborah Reef project, 1989,
