= Bruce Day (engineer) =

Hubert Bruce Day
- Born: 8 December 1927
- Died: 5 December 2015 (aged 87); Melbourne
- Citizenship: Australia
- Engineering career
- Discipline: engineer
- Institutions: Institution of Civil Engineers, Institution of Engineers Australia

Hubert Bruce Day (8 December 1927 – 5 December 2015) was an Australian structural engineer, who undertook bridge design works for the Melbourne & Metropolitan Board of Works and Country Roads Board in Melbourne, Australia from the 1950s to 1980s.

Bruce Day was the principal design engineer for the bridge over Punt Road on the South Eastern Freeway, the first major metropolitan freeway in Melbourne. He also designed the elevated roadway section of stage two of the freeway over the Yarra River and Gardiners Creek. Day was involved in the investigation of the causes of the partial collapse of the Kings Way Bridge, for which he designed post tensioning strengthening. He oversaw the design of three bridges for St Kilda Junction while designing one of them himself. Graham Ebbage designed the westernmost bridge spanning Queens Road. These bridges provided grade separation of major roads and tram bridges. Ebbage went on to design bridges in Brisbane and Hong Kong. In the mid 1970s, Day designed the bridges for the Eastern Freeway stage 1, ensuring that aesthetic considerations were given prominence in this sensitive and controversial project.

The National Trust Historic Concrete Bridges Study identified a number of Day's bridge designs as being of state or regional significance for inclusion on the National Trust Register and Victorian Heritage Register. In particular the South Eastern Freeway elevated section bridges were identified as being of regional significance and the Eastern Freeway Stage 1 Bridges were identified as being of State Significance.

Day made an important contribution to the landscape character and built environment of Melbourne, and played a major role in transforming the city during a period of great change when freeways became the natural means of moving traffic.

== Publications ==
- Abstract of Concrete Bridge Articulation by H.B. Day
