= East End Theatre District =

District of Melbourne, Victoria, Australia

Coordinates: 37°48′45.8″S 144°58′10.3″E

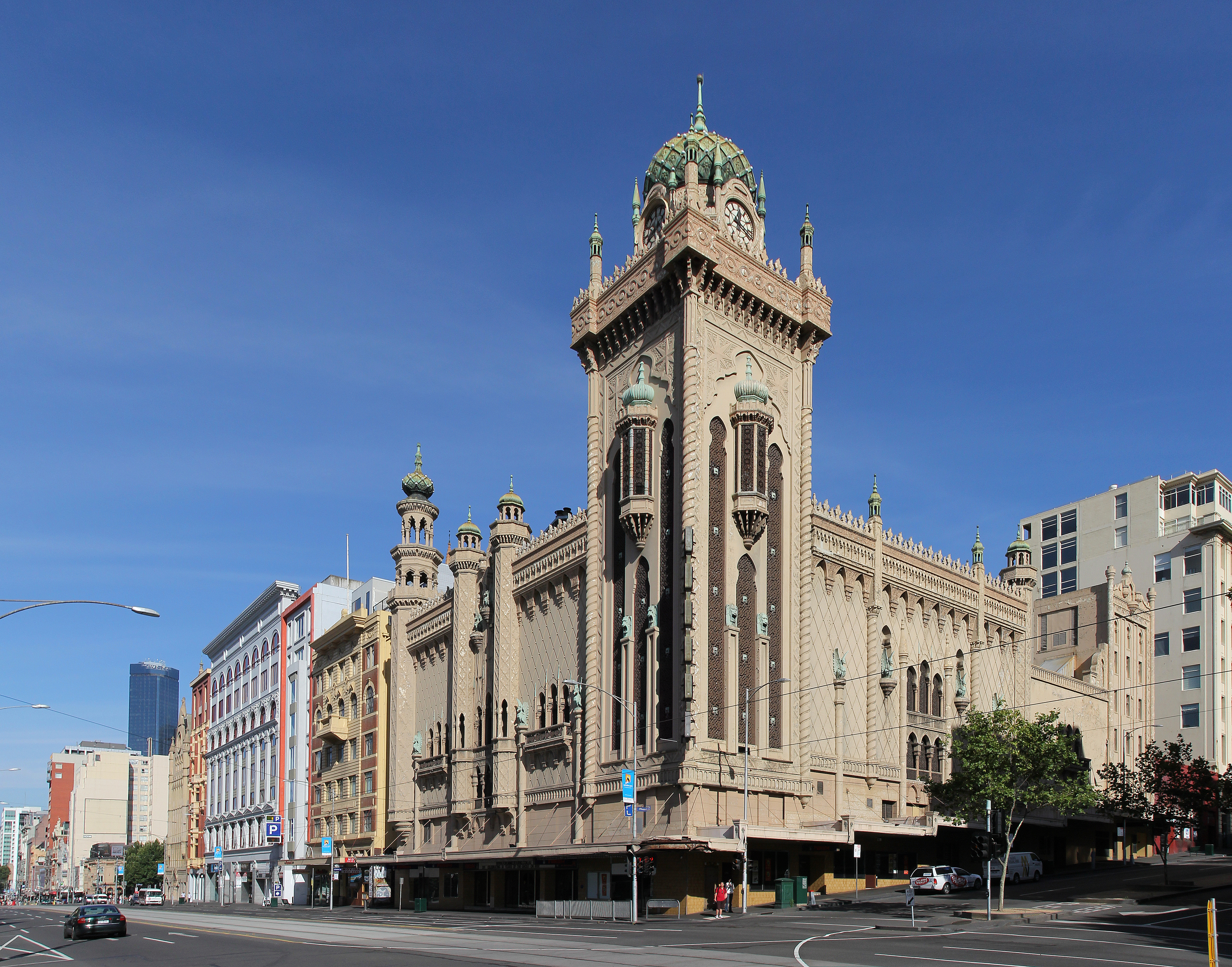
Forum Theatre

The East End Theatre District is a precinct within the central business district (CBD) of Melbourne, Victoria, Australia, and is bounded by Spring, Flinders, Swanston and Lonsdale Streets. The district is home to eight theatres, including the Princess Theatre, Her Majesty's Theatre and the Regent Theatre. These theatres mostly house commercial productions of musicals, plays and other events, in contrast with the city's Southbank Arts Precinct across the Yarra River which focuses on publicly funded companies.

== History ==
The East End of Melbourne was effectively formed by the Hoddle Grid, with Elizabeth Street the dividing line between east and west. The Hoddle Grid was laid out in 1837, following the founding of the Melbourne settlement in 1835.

Melbourne's first theatre, the Pavilion, was constructed adjacent to the Eagle Tavern on Bourke Street in 1842. The second theatre, the Queen's, was also constructed as part of a pub, however it was, and remains, the only major theatre in Melbourne's CBD built west of Elizabeth Street.

== East End theatres ==
Seven purpose-built theatres survive within the East End. The Melbourne Town Hall also serves as a performance space, regularly hosting theatrical shows, concerts, and live comedy. Other major entertainment venues in the East End Theatre District include live music venues 170 Russell and Max Watt's House of Music, Hoyts Melbourne Central, Palace Kino, Chinatown and ACMI cinemas.

Theatre	Address	Opened	Capacity	Owner/Operator	First production	Image
Athenaeum Theatre	188 Collins Street	1872	880	AT Management	Dear Brutus	
The Capitol	113 Swanston Street	1924	602	RMIT		
Comedy Theatre	240 Exhibition Street	1928	1003	Marriner Group	Our Betters	
Fortyfivedownstairs	45 Flinders Lane	2002	150			
Forum Melbourne	154 Flinders Street	1929	2520			
Her Majesty's Theatre	219 Exhibition Street	1886	1700	Hayden Attractions	Bad Lads	
Princess Theatre	163 Spring Street	1854	1452	Marriner Group		
Regent Theatre	191 Collins Street	1929	2141	Marriner Group		
Town Hall	100 Swanston Street	1886	1,990	Council of the City of Melbourne		

== Former theatres ==
The East End has been home to over 25 different theatres since 1841. Some of the major former theatres are listed below.

Theatre	Address	Opened	Closed	Capacity	Owner/Operator	First production	Image
Auditorium	171 Collins Street	1913	1934				
Bijou Theatre	225 Bourke Street	1876	1934				
Gaiety Theatre	217 Bourke Street	1890	1934				
Haymarket Theatre	133 Bourke Street	1862	1871				
King's Theatre	131 Russell Street	1908	1976				
Olympic Theatre	Corner of Exhibition and Lonsdale streets	1855	1860			The Lady of Lyons	
Palace Theatre	20 Bourke Street	1912	2014				
Pavilion	Corner of Swanston and Bourke streets	1841	1845				
Playbox Theatre	55 Exhibition Street	1969	1984				
Prince of Wales Opera House	249 Bourke Street	1872	1898				
Russell Street Theatre	19-25 Russell Street	1955	1994				
Theatre Royal	232 Bourke Street	1855	1872			The School for Scandal	
Tivoli Theatre	249 Bourke Street	1901	1966				
Total House	170 Russell Street	1965	1978				

== Economic impact ==
In July 2016, the East End Theatre District was reported to have made an economic contribution of $692 million, and an economic impact of $226 million, to the state of Victoria.

== See also ==
- List of theatres in Melbourne
