= Angela Rawlings =

Canadian writer and poet (born 1978)

- Born: September 8, 1978 (age 47)
- Writing career
- Pen name: a.rawlings, a rawlings
- Website: arawlings.is

Angela Snæfellsjökuls Rawlings or Angela Marie Rawlings (known as a rawlings) is a Canadian-Icelandic interdisciplinary artist-researcher who works with languages as dominant exploratory material. Their practice seeks and interrogates relationality between bodies—be they human, more-than-human, other-than, non.

== Career ==
In 2001, rawlings received the bpNichol Award for Distinction in Writing when she graduated from York University. From 2001 to 2011, she worked with several Canadian arts organizations, including The Mercury Press, The Scream Literary Festival, Sumach Press, Word: Canada's Magazine for Readers + Writers, and The Lexiconjury Reading Series. In 2005, Rawlings hosted the poetry documentary series Heart of a Poet. She is also co-editor of Shift & Switch: New Canadian Poetry (The Mercury Press, 2005), an anthology featuring over forty emerging poets.

As an arts educator, rawlings has led creative writing workshops for Ryerson University (now Toronto Metropolitan University), terminus1525.ca, Learning through the Arts, League of Canadian Poets, Ontario Arts Council's Artists in Education Program, the Toronto District School Board, Writers in Electronic Residence, the Toronto Public Library system, the State Library of Queensland (Australia), Menningarverkefnið Hlaðan (Vogar, Iceland), Reykjavík UNESCO City of Literature (Reykjavík, Iceland), and NTNU (Trondheim, Norway). They have co-facilitated workshops with Ciara Adams, Julie Lassonde, and Nilan Perera. They currently teach at Iceland University of the Arts.

Rawlings' first book, Wide slumber for lepidopterists was published in spring 2006 by Coach House Books. A reviewer in The Antigonish Review said of it "This lengthy, schematic poetic experiment is a pataphysical eco tour through the world of lepidopterists and dreamer's physiology". It has been the subject of scholarly analysis. In November 2006, Theatre Commutiny staged a full-length performance of the book as part of Harbourfront Centre's Hatch: Emerging Performance Projects series; Rawlings performed in and co-produced the show. In April 2007, Wide slumber for lepidopterists received a nomination for the Gerald Lampert Award for Best First Book of Poetry. The book was also awarded Alcuin Award for Book Design, and was listed in The Globe and Mail's top 100 books of 2006. In Autumn 2008, Belgian composer Sebastian Bradt created a choral score entitled X Our Rotten Beauties that uses text from Wide slumber for lepidopterists. In 2014, Icelandic composer Valgeir Sigurdsson via record label Bedroom Community and in collaboration with VaVaVoom Theatre Company created a full-length music theatre performance of the book, which debuted at the Reykjavík Arts Festival and featured in the 2024 Prototype Festival.

Rawlings has also worked in theatre, music, and dance. They taught ballroom, Latin, and swing dances from 2001-3. In 2005, she co-produced On the Money for Toronto's Fringe Festival, a play awarded the festival's Patron's Pick. They have also worked with Toronto's Theatre Gargantua, was on the board of directors for bluemouth inc. from 2008 to 2010, and is the president for Susanna Hood's hum dansoundart board of executives. rawlings has collaborated with improvising musicians and dancers such as Joe Sorbara and Jonathon Wilcke; sound poets such as Jaap Blonk and Paul Dutton; and the Logos Foundation's invisible and robotic instruments. They were a member of Christine Duncan's Element Choir and Nýlókórinn. rawlings is a co-member of Völva (with Maja Jantar) and Moss Moss Not Moss (with Rebecca Bruton).

Rawlings has been involved in several interdisciplinary collaborations. In 2010, rawlings lent voice to bluemouth inc.'s New York City production of The Sea Museum. In 2010 and 2011, bluemouth inc. joined rawlings to present an original work called The Centre for Sleep and Dream Studies for The Scream Literary Festival and Rhubarb Theatre Festival at Buddies in Bad Times, both in Toronto. From 2009 to 2011, rawlings developed drift with Nilan Perera and Julie Lassonde, which was performed in Toronto and Calgary.

In 2008, Rawlings received the Chalmers Arts Fellowship; this enabled them to spend 2009 and 2010 living and working in Belgium, Canada, and Iceland. In 2011, Rawlings was the artistic director of the International Poetry Festival in Reykjavík. In 2012, Rawlings was selected to hold the position of Queensland Poet-in-Residence; during their tenure, they spent three months travelling throughout Queensland, Australia to give performances, run workshops, offer manuscript consultations, and develop the transdisciplinary digital project Gibber. In 2022, together with Alexander Shelley, rawlings co-curated SPHERE festival, a four day festival of music, visual arts, performance, and conversations between artists and scientists, in collaboration with the Royal Danish Library, Nordic Bridges, and the Canadian Museum of Nature.

Rawlings holds an MSc in Environmental Ethics and Natural Resource Management from the University of Iceland and a PhD in Theatre and Performance Studies at the University of Glasgow. From 2021-2023, Rawlings held a postdoctoral fellowship at HM Queen Margrethe II's and Vigdís Finnbogadóttir's Interdisciplinary Research Centre on Ocean, Climate and Society (ROCS), led by professor in Biological Oceanography Katherine Richardson Christensen.

== Activism ==
In 2024, Rawlings legally adopted the middle name Snæfellsjökuls in order to donate their kennitala to the campaign "Snæfellsjökul fyrir forseta", a geocultural intervention to nominate the glacier Snæfellsjökull to run for president in the 2024 Icelandic Presidential Elections which introduces the concept of the Rights of Nature into societal consciousness and government policy consideration in Iceland. Angela has had a long-lasting relationship with the glacier. In 2024, Jordan Scott published the children’s book Angela’s Glacier which was inspired by Rawlings’ relationship with Snæfellsjökull.

== Bibliography ==
=== Anthologies ===
- 131.839 slög með bilum. Helsinki: Ntamo, 2007 (includes translated excerpt from WSfL).
- A Global Visuage. Vienna: ch edition, 2012 (contributor).
- A Sing Economy. New York: Film Forum Press, 2008 (contributor with François Luong).
- Af steypu. Reykjavík: Nýhil, 2009 (includes excerpt from ljóðapoems).
- Desire, Doom, & Vice, a Canadian Collection. Stratford: Wingate Press, 2005 (contributor).
- I'll Drown My Book: Conceptual Writing by Women. Los Angeles: Les Figues Press, 2012 (includes excerpt from Rule of Three).
- New Icelandic Poetry in Translation. Toronto: BookThug, 2009 (includes translated excerpt from EFHILMNORSTUVWY).
- Pissing Ice: An Anthology of 'New' Canadian Poets. Toronto: BookThug, 2004 (contributor).
- Regreen: New Canadian Ecological Poetry. Sudbury: Your Scrivener Press, 2009 (includes excerpt from EFHILMNORSTUVWY).
- Shift & Switch: New Canadian Poetry. Toronto: Mercury Press, 2005, second printing (editor).
- Strong Words: Year Two. Toronto: Indiepolitik, 2007 (contributor).
- The Common Sky: Canadian Writers Against the War. Toronto: Three Squares Press, 2002 (contributor).

=== Books ===
- Sound of Mull. Glasgow: Laboratory for Aesthetics and Ecology, 2019 (author)
- si tu. Zagreb: MaMa, 2017 (author)
- o w n. Vancouver: CUE Books, 2015 (author with Heather Hermant and Chris Turnbull)
- Wide slumber for lepidopterists. Toronto: Coach House Books, 2006, third printing (author)

=== Chapbooks ===
- The Great Canadian. Buffalo: Low Frequency Press, 2015 (author with Chris Turnbull).
- ljóðapoems. Edmonton: Olive Reading Series, 2008 (author).
- W I D E R: B-sides, rarities, and remixes. New York City: belladonna*, 2006 (author).
- [a,r] [s'c]. Calgary: housepress, 2002 (co-written with Stephen Cain).

=== Digital publications ===
- Jöklar. 2014 (author).
- RUSL. 2014 (author).
- Figure: A Poetry Oracle. 2014 (co-author with Sachiko Murakami).
- Gibber. Queensland Poetry Residency, 2012 (author, designer).

== Education ==
- 2015-2019 Ph.D. University of Glasgow. Dissertation: Performing Geochronology in the Anthropocene: Multiple Temporalities along North Atlantic Foreshores.
- 2011-2014 M.Sc. University of Iceland. Major: Environmental Ethics and Natural Resource Management.
- 1997-2001 B.A. (Hons) York University. Major: Creative Writing. Minor: Fine Arts Cultural Studies.
