= Stephen Fowler =

Stephen Fowler may refer to:

- Stephen Fowler (born 1982), American Idol contestant/semifinalist from the eighth season
- Steven J Fowler (born 1983), English poet, writer and avant-garde artist
