= Peter Bassano =

English conductor and trombonist (1945–2025)

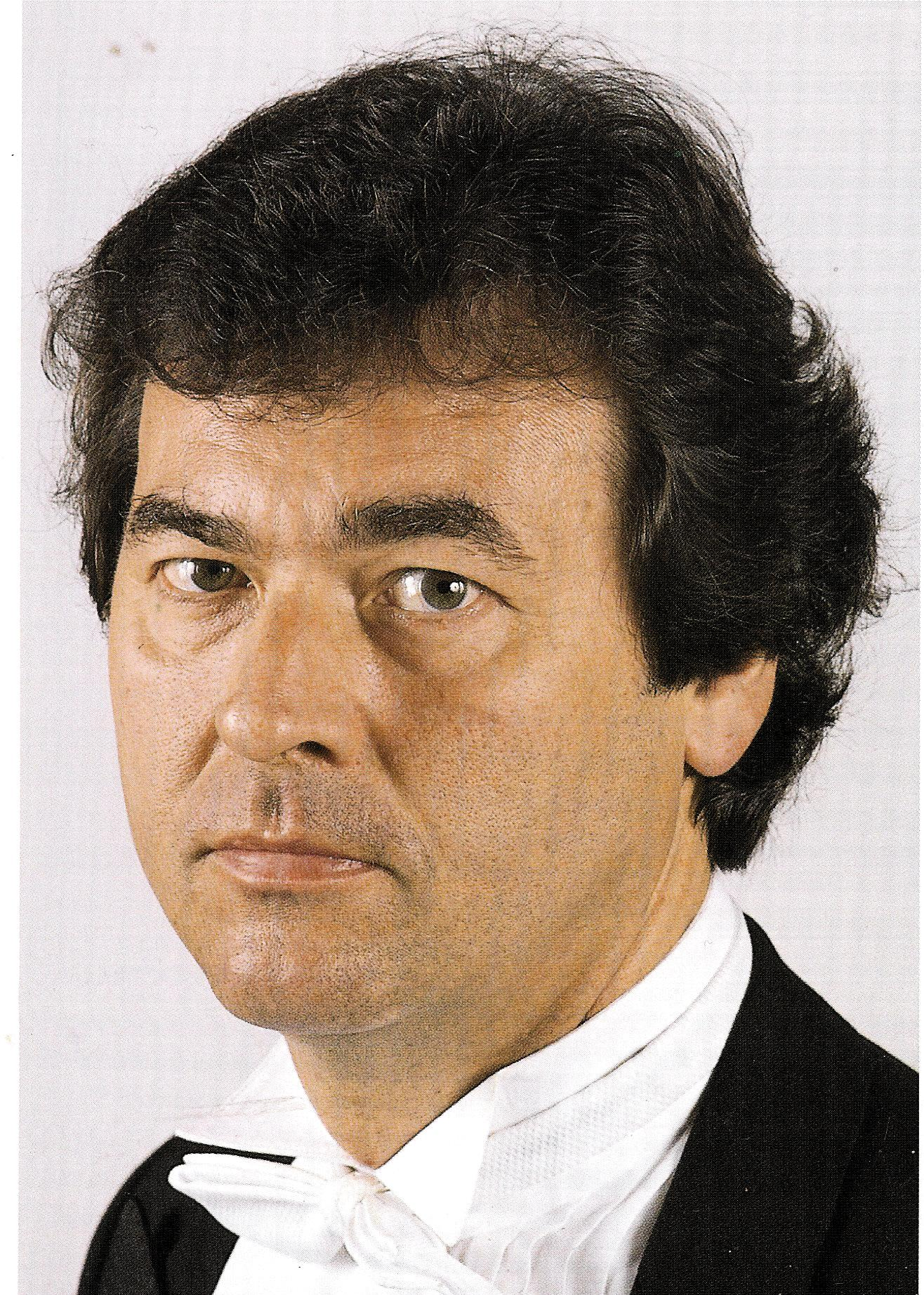
Peter Bassano

Peter Bassano (15 April 1945 – 1 February 2025) was an English conductor and trombonist.

== Background ==
His descent from Anthony Bassano the oldest brother of a family of six Venetian musicians brought to England by King Henry VIII is registered at the College of Arms. Three generations of the Bassano family dominated instrumental music at the English Court from 1540 until the death of Charles I. In May 2012 Peter featured in BBC TV's Franceso da Mosto's Shakespeare in Italy filmed in Bassano del Grappa. Bassano was the author of two books, Shakespeare and Emilia and Before the Music Stopped. Bassano died on 1 February 2025, at the age of 79.

== Performing career ==
Bassano had been Music Director of the Oxford University Sinfonietta – whose broad repertoire spans from Biber to Birtwistle – The Virtuosi of the Mannheim Court, The City of Rochester Symphony Orchestra, the professional choir, The Gentlemen of the Chappell, The Equale Baroque Players, Wendover Choral Society, City of Cambridge Brass Band and Oxford Touring Opera. He had appeared as guest conductor with the Britten-Pears Orchestra, Brook Street Band, Orquestra da Camara de Cascais e Oeiras, Corelli Chamber Orchestra, Helsinki Philharmonic, Eton College Symphony Orchestra, Hong Kong Academy Wind Orchestra, Imperial College Symphony Orchestra, Royal Melbourne Philharmonic Choir, National Youth Wind Orchestra, Royal Philharmonic, Royal College of Music Symphony Orchestra and Sinfonietta, Royal Oman Symphony, State Symphony Orchestra of Mexico, Ulster Youth Orchestra, Vaasa City Orchestra as well as at many conservatoires, choirs and bands around the world.

He studied trombone and singing at the Royal College of Music 1965–68. As a trombonist, he was a member of London's Philharmonia Orchestra for 27 years but retained a commitment to the performance of wider musical genres than just the symphonic, including early music on original instruments. He played the sackbut for David Munrow's Early Music Consort, Musica Reservata, the English Baroque Soloists, the Gabrieli Consort and His Majesties Sagbutts and Cornetts as well as playing the trombone occasionally for the Fires of London and the London Sinfonietta. As an orchestral musician he played under Abbado, Barenboim, Bohm, Boulez, Boult, Britten, Copland, Sir Andrew Davis, Sir Colin Davis, Elder, Gardiner, Giardelli, Giulini, Harnoncourt, Henze, Klemperer, Knussen, Kubelik, Leinsdorf, Levine, Lutoslawski, MacMillan, von Matačić Maxwell Davies, McCreesh, Mehta, Muti, Maazel, Norrington, Ozawa, Penderecki, Previn, Rattle, Rostropovich, Salonen, Santi, Simonov, Sinopoli, Stockhausen, Svetlanov, Temirkanov, Tippett, Tilson-Thomas, Willcocks and Zinman.

He was elected for two terms to the Philharmonia's Council of Management and was a member of the Orchestra's Artistic Planning Committee of four, the others being Amelia Freedman, Robert Ponsonby and John Wallace.

His career as a free-lance trombone player took him to all of the London orchestras, playing in many West-end musicals, including Golden Boy, Man of la Mancha, Threepenny Opera, The Great Waltz, the National Theatre (Much Ado about Nothing, H, Three Sisters), a run of Stravinsky's The Soldier's Tale at the Young Vic, the Philip Jones Brass Ensemble, films – Brother Sun and Sister Moon, Meaning of Life, Oliver, Ryan's Daughter, Ivanhoe, Superman 2, The Devils, The Lion in Winter, Watership Down and Women in Love – and television – All Creatures Great and Small, Black Beauty, Elizabeth R, I, Claudius, The Gay Lord Quex, The Pallisers – and touring and recording with the Bee Gees, Pink Floyd and the Beatles on the chart topping Hey Jude.

He was the founder, trombonist and Artistic Director of the brass quintet, Equale Brass. This ensemble, which was composed of Philharmonia players John Wallace, John Miller (trumpets), Michael Thompson (horn) and John Jenkins (tuba), made seven records, toured worldwide, and commissioned twenty seven new works from composers as diverse as David Bedford, Peter Skellern, Roger Smalley and John Tavener. Bassano acted as Secretary to the Equale Trust, a registered charity that supported the commissioning of composers and sought sponsorship for the work of Equale Brass.

== Higher education ==
Bassano returned to the Royal College of Music as professor of trombone in 1978, he was appointed Head of Brass Faculty and Staff Conductor in 1993, a position he held until 2004. He had given masterclasses at the Paris Conservatoire, Sibelius Akademy (Helsinki), Hong Kong Academy, Royal Swedish Academy, Canberra, Melbourne and Sydney Conservatoires and had been a guest lecturer at Cambridge, Duke, Edinburgh, Indiana, Open, Oxford, Tokyo University of the Art, Queen's, Salford, Trinity and York Universities. He had written numerous articles for the British musical and national press – including The Daily Telegraph, The Guardian, The Independent and The Times – and presented research on the Bassano Family, Beethoven, Byrd, Shakespeare and Veronese. Bassano had served as a competition adjudicator for the BBC Young Musician of the Year, European Music Prize for Youth, Royal OverSeas League, Royal Philharmonic Society, Charterhouse, Eton College, Brass Band Championships in Bergen, Stavanger and Linz in the UK in Midlands, Northern Ireland, Scotland, West of England and Yorkshire areas. He had been an external examiner for the Birmingham Conservatoire, Guildhall School of Music and Drama, Royal Academy of Music, Royal Northern College of Music, Royal Welsh College of Music and Drama, Royal Scottish Academy of Music and Drama and Trinity Laban Conservatoire of Music and Dance.

== Conducting career ==
Throughout the second half of his playing career he also worked as a conductor taking conducting lessons from Sir John Eliot Gardiner, Nikolaus Harnoncourt, Elgar Howarth, Sir Charles Mackerras, Sir Roger Norrington, Jorma Panula and Bramwell Tovey. It was these teachers plus his own broad playing experience that shaped his distinctive and historically aware approach to interpretation.

He was assistant conductor to Paul McCreesh and his Gabrieli Consort and Players on the award-winning Venetian Coronation and Music at San Rocco and Sir John Eliot Gardiner for his Berlioz Romeo and Juliet recording projects. His recording of music by the early Bassanos and the musical associates of Giovanni Bassano the Gabrielis Andrea and Giovanni and Monteverdi, Venice Preserved on the ASV label received critical acclaim.

In Great Britain, he had conducted at the Royal Festival Hall sharing the podium with Vladimir Ashkenazy in the Royal Philharmonic Orchestra's International Series and at the Royal Albert Hall in a BBC Promenade Concert and at Symphony Hall, Birmingham. In addition he has made several Festival appearances at Aldeburgh, Chester, Greenwich, Nottingham, the Three Choirs.

He had conducted the RCM Chamber Choir (including the first performance in modern times of Beethoven's Trauerklange), introduced a standing RCM Symphony Orchestra to an historically aware performance of Berlioz Sinfonie fantastique and directed the Baroque Orchestra in performances of three of Bach's Brandenburg Concertos at Buckingham Palace. In January 1995 he was one of the first conductors to appear at the newly built Paris concert hall, Cité de la Musique conducting the complete instrumental music of Gabrieli's 1597 Sinfonae Sacrae. He returned to this major Paris venue in July 1998 to conduct two concerts with the Grimethorpe Colliery Band to ecstatic reviews and high-profile TV coverage.

A champion of new music, he had commissioned and conducted the first performances of Tim Souster's Echoes (Manchester/BBC Radio 3), Joseph Horovitz's Tuba Concerto (Nottingham Festival) and Andrew Powell's Falstaff: Theme and Episodes (Paris, Cité de la Musique), Chris Batchelor's Weasel Words & Winning Ways, Max Charles Davies's Trinity-Credo, Simon Dobson's Four Britten Sketches and Fanfare for Peter, Aaron Einbond's Floral Decorations for Bananas, Edmund Jolliffe's Breathe, Gabriella Swallow's Spit, Ivor Bonnici's Three Movements for Chamber Orchestra and the UK premiere of Esa-Pekka Salonen's Stockholm Diary, Robert Saxton's Sonata on a theme of Orlando Gibbons, Britta Bystom's Rebellion in Greenery, Wilfred Heaton's Healing Stream, Christopher Gunning's Wicken Fen Jacon Bride's Percussion Concerto and Sebastian Currier's Remix.

== Honorary awards ==
- Fellow of the Royal College of Music 1997
- Member of the Royal College of Music 1982
