= Melbourne Athenaeum =

Theatre in Melbourne, Victoria

Athenaeum
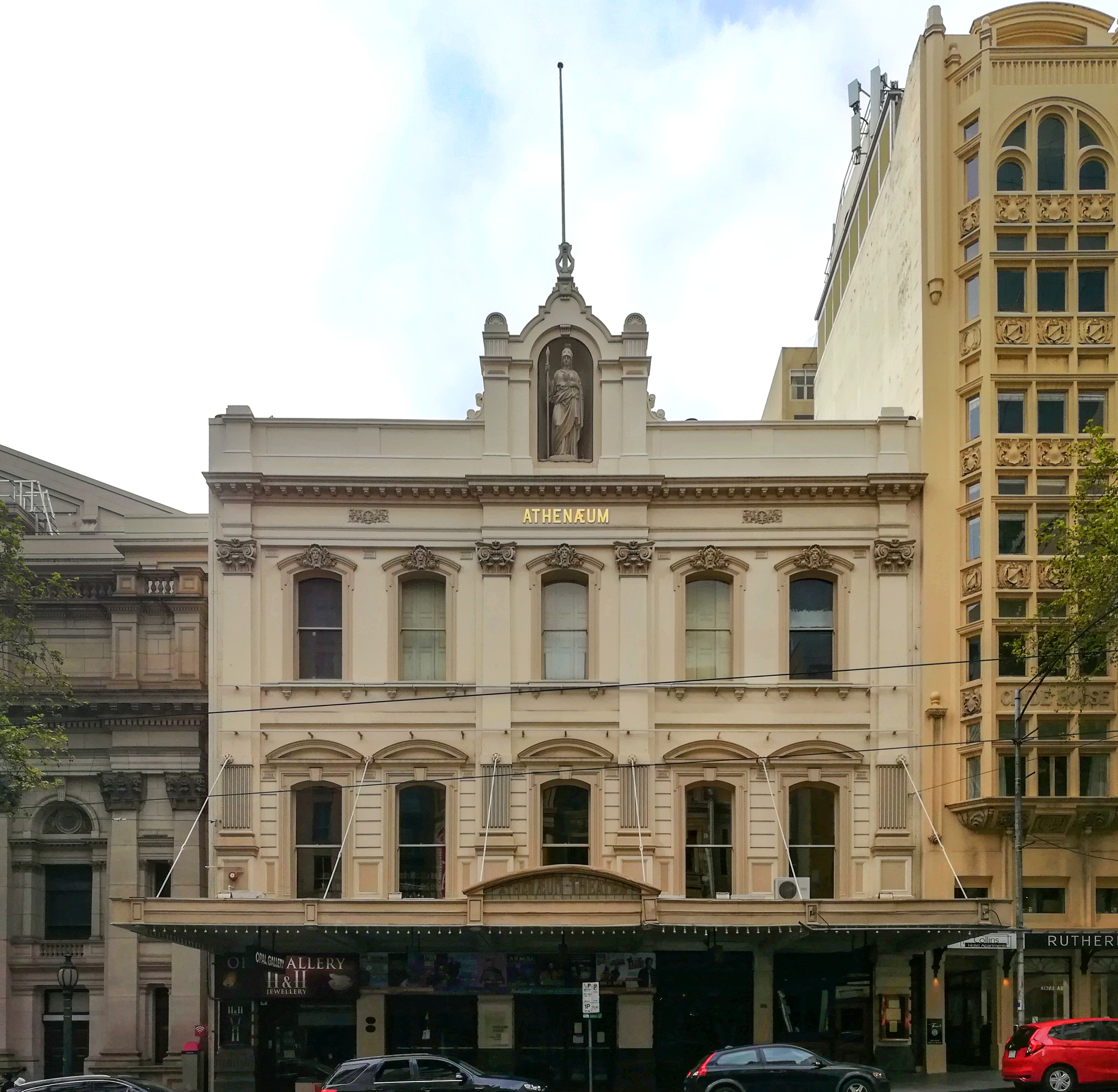
- The Melbourne Athenaeum
- Interactive map of Athenaeum
- Address: 188 Collins Street; Melbourne, Victoria; Australia
- Coordinates: 37.81504°S 144.96736°E
- Capacity: 880 (theatre one)
- Designation: Victorian Heritage Register, Register of Historic Buildings
- Current use: Live theatre, comedy, library, readings

Construction
- Opened: 1839
- Rebuilt: 1885-1886
- Years active: 186–187
- Architect: Smith & Johnson

Website
- www.athenaeumtheatre.com.au

The Athenaeum or Melbourne Athenaeum at 188 Collins Street is an art and cultural hub in the central business district of Melbourne, Victoria, Australia. Founded in 1839, it is the city's oldest cultural institution.

Its building on Collins Street in the East End Theatre District sits opposite the Regent Theatre, and currently consists of a main theatre, a smaller studio theatre, a restaurant and a subscription library. It has also served as a mechanics' institute, an art exhibition space, and a cinema.

== Architecture ==
The Athenaeum is a restrained boom-style neoclassical three-storey building designed by architects Smith and Johnson with stuccoed facade with pilasters, label moulds, and bracketed cornice. It was completed in 1886 on the site of the original building of 1842, and is surmounted with a parapet with a niche housing a statue by Richard Kretzschmar of Minerva (Athena, hence 'Athenaeum'), goddess of reason, wisdom, arts and literature. The building was added to the National Trust's Register of Historic Buildings in 1981 and is listed on the Victorian Heritage Register.

== History ==
=== Early history ===
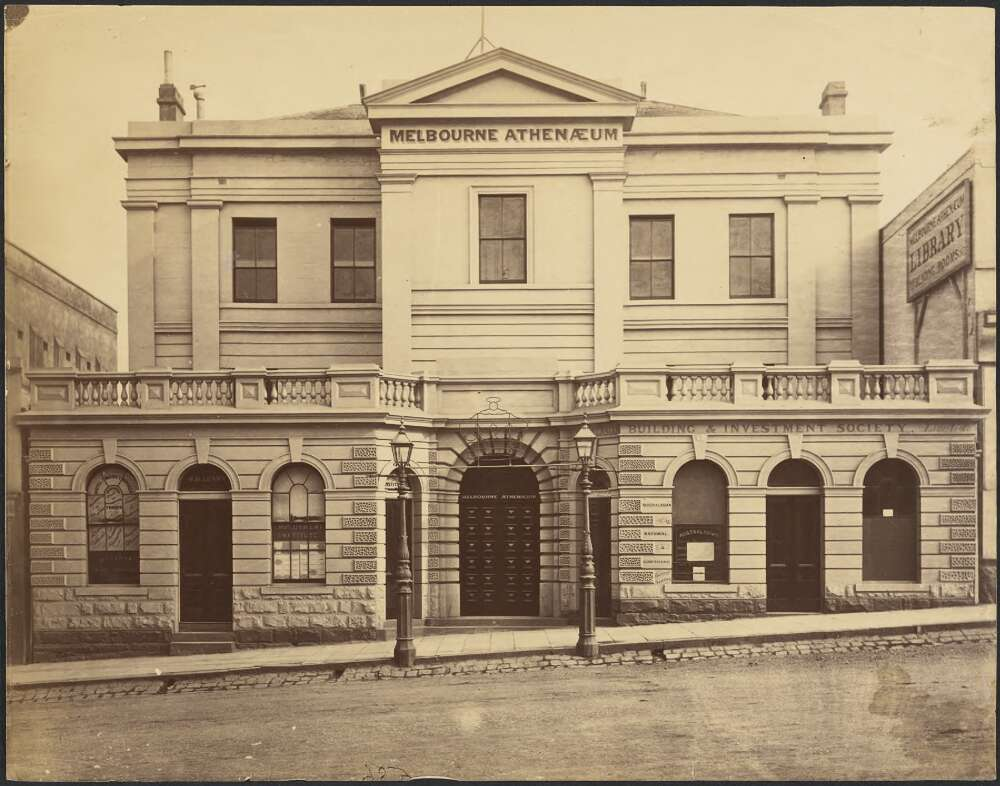
American & Australasian Photographic Company (Sydney, NSW). Melbourne Athenaeum original building before 1873.

In August 1840, the Melbourne Mechanics Institution acquired land spanning 110 feet along Collins Street and extending to Little Collins Street, for a sum of £285. The initial structure, a two-story brick building known as the Hall of Arts was completed in December 1842.

The first President was Captain William Lonsdale, the first Patron was the Superintendent of Port Phillip, Charles La Trobe and the first books were donated by Vice-President Henry Fyshe Gisborne. Originally called the Melbourne Mechanics' Institute, it was renamed the Melbourne Mechanics' Institution and School of Arts in 1846.

The Melbourne City Council met in the ground floor of the building until 1852 when the Melbourne Town Hall was built. The Institute received an annual grant of £150 from the government, and in 1854, an additional £5,000 was granted for construction of a new building, but from 1857, it had to rely on its own funds. By 1851, the membership count reached 488 individuals. Additionally, it served as the headquarters for the First Church of Christ, Scientist.

Construction on the new building began in 1855, but only the front portion was finished. The rear hall, intended to be designed by Charles Webb, was deferred until 1871 and ultimately completed in 1872. Alfred Smith served as the architect, while Turnbull and Dick were the builders. The Institution changed its name to the Melbourne Athenaeum in 1872 During the period when its own church was being reconstructed, Scots Church utilized the premises as its temporary location.

Among the office bearers of the institution in the nineteenth century was the author Marcus Clarke who was the chairman of the library committee in 1877. As now, a focal point was the library and by 1877, membership was 1,681 and in 1879 there were 30,000 visits to the library. In 1880 it was reported 'that the floor of the large hall was the only one in Melbourne expressly constructed for dancing'. The remodeled facade was finally concluded in 1886. The statue of Minerva, which was modelled by Richard Kretzschmar on that at the Vatican, was funded through Alderman Thomas Moubray's gift of 100 guineas.

=== Theatre and cinema ===
In October 1896, the first movie was shown in the Athenaeum Hall. This may not have been the first in Australia however, as a cinematograph was being demonstrated at the Melbourne Opera House in August. On 26 January 1901 Life in Our Navy, a 60,000 foot film of life on HMS Jupiter, was shown by G. H. Snazelle, who provided additional entertainment.

The Hall became a regular venue for screening films and the premiere of The Story of the Kelly Gang by the Tait brothers, the world's first dramatic feature film, was at the Athenaeum in 1906.

The theatre in its present form, a proscenium arch theatre with 880 seats on three levels, was created in 1924, for its lessee Frank Talbot by architect Henry Eli White. Renamed Athenaeum Theatre, it was one of the first venues in Australia to screen talking pictures, presenting The Jazz Singer in February 1929. From the 1920s to the early 1970s, the theatre was mainly used as a cinema. Talbot was lessee and manager from 1922 to 1936. The Melbourne Theatre Company (MTC) leased the theatre from 1976 to 1985 when the lease was taken over by various entrepreneurs who formed AT Management in 1997.

The upstairs studio theatre ("Ath 2"), created from the former art gallery by the MTC, has been used as a theatre space and the venue for The Last Laugh Comedy Club after it moved from North Melbourne.

=== Art gallery ===
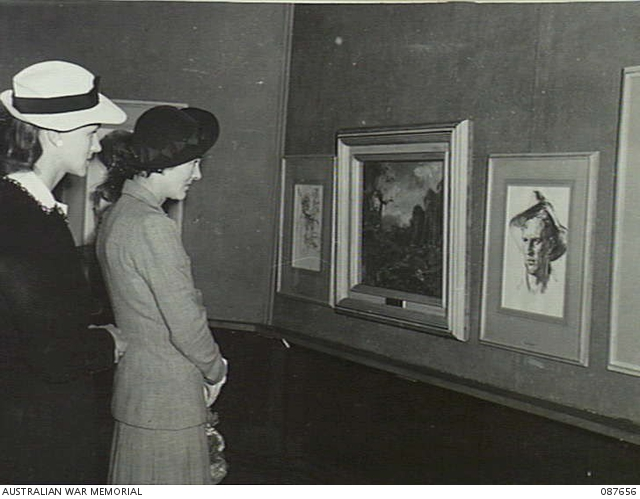
Mrs. G.M. Norris, with Mrs K. D. MacDougal, examining an Exhibition of Paintings by the Official War Artist Captain Ivor Hele at the Athenaeum Gallery

Artist Jo Sweatman recalled that it was Frederick McCubbin's wife Annie who first proposed the Athenaeum as a possible art gallery. In 1910 Walter Withers, Bernard Hall, Frederick McCubbin and John Mather approached Athenaeum secretary Reginald W.E. Wilmot to discuss its potential as a venue for exhibitions. Consequently the upper hall, previously used as a small museum, was installed with a lantern on the roof by architects Sydney Smith and Ogg, in order to light the art gallery. Officially established as The Athenaeum Art Gallery, it hosted the first exhibition of Frederick McCubbin's The Pioneer in 1904.

After WWI had reduced the frequency of shows, in 1919 and after a complete refurbishment, the Australian tonalists staged their first group exhibition there, one of whom, Clarice Beckett, held nine solo shows there between 1923 and 1932, with a posthumous exhibition mounted there after her premature death. 'Jock' Frater held his first solo show there in 1923, marking his break from the Tonalists. The gallery was much in demand and artists had to book a year in advance. It showed paintings by Rupert Bunny, Hans Heysen, Albert Namatjira, Tom Roberts, John Rowell, Ernest Buckmaster, Constance Stokes and Arthur Streeton, before closing in 1971. The gallery also hosted talks by the Melbourne Society of Women Painters, including one in 1935 at which Mary Cecil Allen spoke.

=== Exhibitions held at the Melbourne Athenaeum ===
- 1904, from 24 October: Australian Landscapes by John Mather
- 1906: Yarra Sculptors' Society: Eighth Annual Exhibition, Sculpture, Painting, Prints
- 1910: Yarra Sculptors' Society: Tenth Annual Exhibition
- 1910, October: Victorian Artists' Society'
- 1910: Wynnum School of Arts, Sculpture, Paintings, Prints
- 1910, 15 September–1 October: Paintings and Drawings by L. Bernard Hall
- 1911, 7–24 April: Frederick McCubbin
- 1911, 24 July–14 August: Rupert Bunny
- 1912, 14 August–1 September: Fred and Louis McCubbin
- 1912, 26 September–17 October: J. Mather's Paintings
- 1913, September: Twelve Melbourne Painters'
- 1915, from 4 March: Pictures by Hans Heysen
- 1916, 30 August–13 September: The late Mr.J. Mather's paintings
- 1917, 12–22 September: Australian Art Association. Fifth Annual Exhibition
- 1918, 6–20 July: Salon des Poilus. Exhibition of Pictures for sale in aid of the French Red Cross
- 1919 September, A Meldrum Group
- 1919, November: Margery Withers 1919
- 1920, 18–28 May: Norah Gurdon
- 1920 June, A Meldrum Group
- 1920, from 1 October: Australian Art Association, Annual Exhibition
- 1921: The Women's Art Club. Annual Exhibition of Paintings, Sculpture and Craft Work
- 1921 May, A Meldrum Group
- 1921, August: Twenty Melbourne Painters
- 1921, 30 October–5 November: Arthur Streeton. Sunlit suburbs of Sydney
- 1922, November: Group exhibition: Margery, Nancy & Meynell Withers
- 1923, 10–23 April: Norah Gurdon
- 1923 June: Clarice Beckett
- 1923 July, Twenty Melbourne Painters
- 1923, August: Women's Art Club
- 1923, August: Twenty Melbourne Painters
- 1924 May, Twenty Melbourne Painters
- 1924, 1–11 October: Women's Art Club
- 1924 September: Clarice Beckett
- 1925, 20–30 May: Norah Gurdon
- 1925, June: Women's Art Club
- 1925 July: Clarice Beckett
- 1925, from 3 September: Australian Art Association, Annual Exhibition
- 1925, September: Twenty Melbourne Painters
- 1925 September, Twenty Melbourne Painters
- 1926 July 20–31: Clarice Beckett
- 1926, September: Twenty Melbourne Painters 8th annual exhibition
- 1926, 1–11 December, Women's Art Club
- 1927, 1–12 March: Rupert Bunny
- 1927, 28 April–7 May: Norah Gurdon
- 1927 July, Women's Art Club
- 1927 September: Clarice Beckett
- 1927, September: Twenty Melbourne Painters
- 1928, 6–17 March: Watercolours and woodcuts by E.W. Syme
- 1928 July: Clarice Beckett
- 1928, 11–21 July: Rupert Bunny
- 1928, September: Twenty Melbourne Painters 10th annual exhibition
- 1928, October: Women's Art Club Annual Exhibition
- 1928 October, Melbourne Society of Women Painters
- 1929, April: Jo Sweatman
- 1929, July: Margery Withers
- 1929, September: Twenty Melbourne Painters
- 1929 October, Melbourne Society of Women Painters
- 1929 November: Clarice Beckett
- 1930, August–September: Ernest Buckmaster
- 1930 September, Twenty Melbourne Painters
- 1930 October: Clarice Beckett
- 1930 October, Melbourne Society of Women Painters
- 1931, from 1 July: Seven Australian Painters
- 1931 September, Twenty Melbourne Painters
- 1931 October: Clarice Beckett (show opened by Max Meldrum)
- 1931 October, Melbourne Society of Women Painters
- 1932, July: Margery Withers
- 1932 September, Twenty Melbourne Painters
- 1932 October: Clarice Beckett
- 1933, 9–20 May: Jo Sweatment. Australian landscapes, Athenaeum Gallery,
- 1933, 4–15 July: Rupert Bunny
- 1933 September, Twenty Melbourne Painters
- 1933, 27 October –11 November: Australian Art Association, Annual Exhibition
- 1933: An exhibition by Melbourne Painters in aid of Hermannsburg Water Supply Central Australia
- 1934, 27 February–10 March: Exhibition of Paintings by the late E. Phillips Fox and Ethel Carrick
- 1934, 31 July–11 August: Exhibition of Paintings and Drawings by Members of the Contemporary Art Group
- 1934, September: Twenty Melbourne Painters 16th annual exhibition
- 1934 October, A Meldrum Group
- 1934, 17–22 December: Oscar Binder, Exhibition of etchings
- 1935, 30 April–11 May: Jo Sweatman (catalogue)
- 1935, 6–17 August Exhibition by Members of New Melbourne Art Club
- 1935, September: Twenty Melbourne Painters
- 1935, 17–28 September: Jane Wilkinson Whyte. Work: old and new
- 1936, 18 April–2 May: Annual exhibition of the Victorian salon of photography, incl. Julian Smith, Spencer Shier and Athol Shmith
- 1936, 14–25 July: Exhibition by Members of New Melbourne Art Club
- 1936, 11–22 August: Exhibition of Paintings and Drawings by Members of the Contemporary Art Group
- 1936, September: Twenty Melbourne Painters 18th annual exhibition
- 1936, 8–19 September: Dorothy Whitehead
- 1937, May: Jo Sweatman (catalogue)
- 1937, 12–24 July: Exhibition by Members of New Melbourne Art Club
- 1937, 10–21 August: Exhibition of Paintings and Drawings by Members of the Contemporary Art Group
- 1937, 30 November–11 December: John Gardner, Oil Paintings, Prints
- 1938, 19–30 July: Exhibition by Members of New Melbourne Art Club
- 1938, September: Twenty Melbourne Painters
- 1938, 26 September–8 October: Dorothy Whitehead exhibition
- 1939, 21 August– 2 September: Exhibition by Members of New Melbourne Art Club
- 1940, from 5-–16 March: Maud Glover Fleay and Annie Gates
- 1940, 19–22 March: Exhibition in support of the Red Cross
- 1940, 20–31 August: Exhibition by Members of New Melbourne Art Club
- 1941, from 23 August: Exhibition by Members of New Melbourne Art Club
- 1943, 20 April–1 May: Josephine Muntz-Adams: Exhibition of paintings
- 1959, from 1 June: Len Annois. The Yarra Valley from Studley Park to Templestowe.
- 1942, from 23 July: Exhibition by Members of New Melbourne Art Club
- 1943, 18–29 May: Jo Sweatman
- 1944, September: Twenty Melbourne Painters 26th annual exhibition
- 1945, 22 May–2 June: Jo Sweatman
- 1945, October: Twenty Melbourne Painters
- 1946, 3–14 September: Twenty Melbourne Painters Society
- 1947, May: Jo Sweatman
- 1947, September: Twenty Melbourne Painters, Athenaeum Gallery, 1947
- 1948, September: Twenty Melbourne Painters, Athenaeum Gallery, 1948

=== Proposed demolition and replacement ===
It was listed in 1948 as one of the key sites for the modernisation of Melbourne. Plans were prepared for a modern building including as new library and gallery, however the development did not proceed.

=== Subscription library ===
Membership of the Athenaeum's subscription library peaked at 7,579 in 1950, after the State Library of Victoria ceased lending of its books in 1939. Membership reduced over the subsequent decades to 1,600 by the mid-1980s, and 750 by the late 2000s. Membership is now increasing.

== Today ==
Today, the Athenaeum Theatre is used for theatre, comedy and music performances, including as a principal venue for the Melbourne International Comedy Festival and Melbourne Opera. The Wheeler Centre for Books, Writing and Ideas presents discussions and talks at the theatre.

The subscription library has a 30,000-strong collection and hosts regular events, talks, book clubs and a screen club.

== See also ==
- List of theatres in the Melbourne City Centre
- List of heritage listed buildings in Melbourne
