= Frank Talbot (theatre) =

Australian impresario

Frank Talbot (1866 – 17 July 1949) was an Australian impresario remembered for his association with the Athenaeum theatre of Melbourne.

== History ==
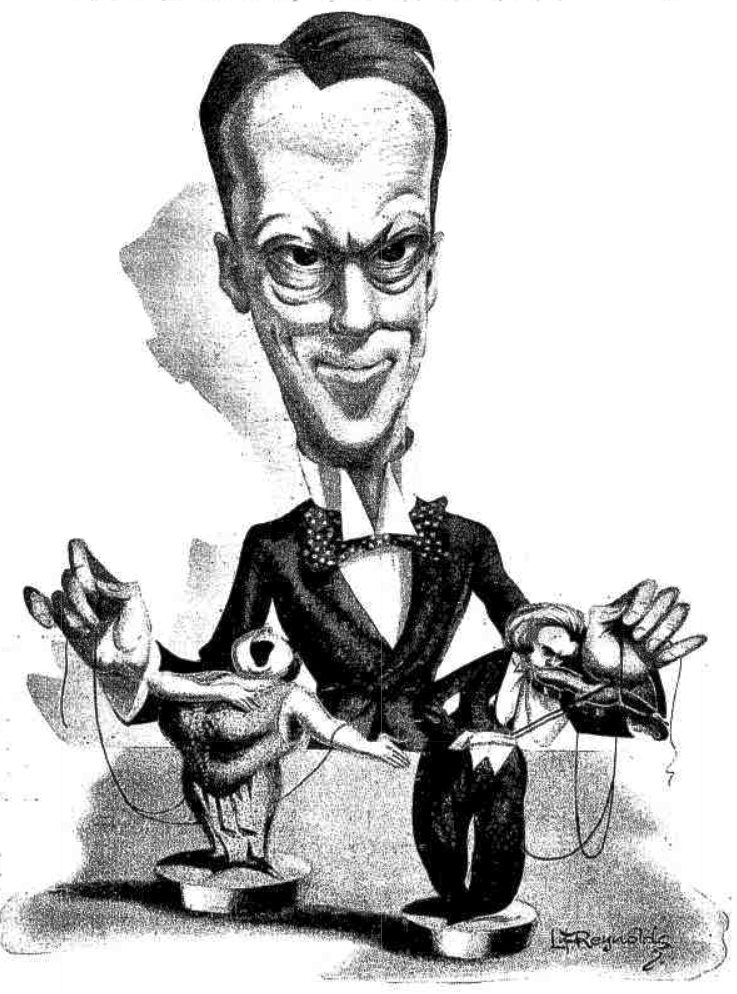
Caricature by Leonard Frank Reynolds

Talbot was born Francis Talbot Patten in Ballarat, and early acted as stage manager for amateur plays Charley's Aunt, The Private Secretary and Dr Bill, a farce by Hamilton Aide. He later promoted the Australian sleight of hand magician Czerny (the journalist Alfred G. Lumsden).

From 1918, in conjunction with the Carroll brothers, E. J. Carroll and Dan Carroll, he screened Australian films Ginger Mick and The Sentimental Bloke in London.

Working for J. & N. Tait in the 1920s, Talbot acted as personal assistant to some of their attractions, such as Emma Calve. He managed tours of Marie Narelle, Jessie McLachlan, Calve, Kubelik, the pianist Leonard Borwick, Clara Butt, Paul Dufault and the Countess Cisneros.

J. C. Williamson's persuaded him to "jump ship" and for them he managed tours of the Royal Comic Opera Co., Grace Palotta, Julius Knight, Muriel Starr, and the dancer Adeline Genee.

In 1923 he secured a long-term lease on the Athenaeum building in Collins Street, and over the following year architect Henry Eli White (who remodeled the Princess and the Palace) transformed it into a comedy theatre.

In 1934, galled at the stranglehold Hollywood had over Australian film distribution, he dedicated the Athenaeum to screening British films. His death coincided with the Australian release of that masterpiece of British film-making, The Red Shoes.

He died in a private hospital from complications arising from a fractured thigh. He sustained the injury on 12 July on the Princes Bridge after being accidentally knocked to the ground by a young female pedestrian hurrying to catch a train.

== Family ==
Lorna Dorothea Patten married Martin
