= Susan Alexjander =

American sound artist, musical composer and teacher

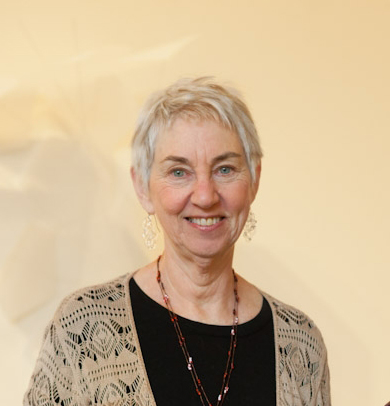
- Susan Alexjander
- Born: United States
- Education: B.A. in English Literature (1966); Master's in Theory and Composition, San Jose State University (1982)
- Occupations: Sound artist, musical composer, teacher
- Known for: Microtonal music based on natural frequencies, DNA music
- Notable work: "Sequencia" (1990); Soundtracks for film installations Collaborations with scientists and artists
- Website: Our Sound Universe

Susan Alexjander is an American sound artist, musical composer and teacher living and working in Portland, Oregon. Finding inspiration in the natural world and in science, she is fascinated by the vibrational frequencies of natural phenomena, ranging widely from the microscopic (elements, DNA) to the macroscopic (body rhythms, water, stars, time). She has created a microtonal system based on the frequencies of DNA, transforming natural vibrational patterns into sounds to create music. She has collaborated with both scientists and artists, and her compositions have been performed both nationally and internationally.

== Education ==
Alexjander received a B.A. in English Literature, with teaching credentials, in 1966. She received a master's degree in Theory and Composition from San Jose State University, California in 1982. Although her initial musical training was classical, she became interested in the gamelan and explored Indian classical music, studying and performing with Lou Harrison.

== Teaching ==
Alexjander has taught at San Jose State and Goddard College and has been an adjunct faculty member of Union Institute in Sacramento, California. She also presents workshops on the physics and metaphysics of sound. She is the Director of Science & The Arts, founded in Aptos, California to investigate the frequencies of the universe and their musical properties.

== Compositions and collaborations ==
External media

Audio
- Episode 136: Good Vibrations, Science History Institute, 2011

Video
- Susan Alexjander, Aqua Symposium, Documentary by Joe Good
- Fluid, Dance performance, choreographed by Lavinia Magliocco, composed by Susan Alexjander, 2012
- Eikos, Paloma Griffin, violin; Susan Alexjander, synthesizer; Lavinia Magliocco, dance

In one of her earliest collaborations, with biologist David W. Deamer from the University of California, Alexjander created music based on movements of the atoms and molecules that make up human DNA. An infrared spectrophotometer was used to measure the wavelength of infrared light absorbed by sections of DNA and to identify frequencies for each DNA molecule. The ratios of the light frequencies were then converted into perceptible ratios of sound frequencies, often involving microtonal changes, to create "strange, beautiful music". The resulting album Sequencia, a pioneering experiment in sound creation, was recorded on Earth Day, 1990. Its tuning system, a type of Just intonation, is based on the molecular frequencies of the four bases of DNA: adenine, guanine, cytosine and thymine. It includes 60 tones over a range of two-and-a-half octaves, around a spontaneous "tonal center". Alexjander's compositions in this tonal system are influenced by the microtonal nature of Indian classical music.

"The magic of 'mapping' frequencies from one medium to another allows us to hear inner, unheard sounds... Everything is talking to everything else!"

Other collaborations include:

- film soundtracks for video installations Into Being - The River (2003), Zero Waiting (2005) and Fragile Memories (2015) with filmmaker Diana Hobson
- Music for Rebecca Kamen's installation Divining Nature: An Elemental Garden (2010)
- Eikos (2012) for violin, synthesizer and dancer Lavinia Magliocco
- Traces of the Cosmos (2012) with Jan Madill (painter)
- Coming On The Backs of Whales, soundtrack for Ocean with a room-sized cloth sculpture by Thais Mazur and cinema photography by Lisa Denning
- Crazy Jane performances with Cascadia Composers
- Continuum (2015) multimedia installation, in collaboration with sculptor Rebecca Kamen, featuring Portal: Black Holes/White Holes (2015) and NeuroCantos. In Portal Alexjander creates a soundscape using sonic frequencies to represent a pair of orbiting black holes, in honor of the 100th anniversary of Albert Einstein’s discovery of general relativity In NeuroCantos, Alexjander combines sounds based on neurons firing, with the words of poet Steven J. Fowler and scientist Santiago Ramón y Cajal.

== Awards ==
- Fellowship, Alden B. Dow Creativity Center, Midland, Michigan, to explore the geometry of the mineral kingdom as musical data
- Composer's Residency at Leighton Studios in Banff, Alberta, Canada
