= List of theatres in Melbourne =

This is a list of theatres in Melbourne in Victoria, Australia.

== Melbourne City Centre ==
The Melbourne City Centre has two distinct areas with concentrations of theatres: the East End, situated in the Hoddle Grid, which contains many of Melbourne's historic theatres; and Southbank, which is home to the more contemporary venues of the Melbourne Arts Precinct.

=== East End, Hoddle Grid ===
Name	Address	Opened	Seats	Use	Notes	Image
Athenaeum Theatre	188 Collins Street	1927	880	theatre, comedy	Former hall remodelled as theatre in 1927	
Capitol Theatre	113 Swanston Street	1924	600	films, comedy, talks, theatre	Cinema purchased by RMIT in 1999	
Comedy Theatre	240 Exhibition Street	1928	997	theatre, comedy	Replaced one of Melbourne's earliest theatres, the Olympic Theatre	
Deakin Edge	Federation Square	2003	269–450	live music, events, talks		
Forum Theatre	154 Flinders Street	1929	1,320	live music, comedy	Downstairs Auditorium seats 800, Upstairs Auditorium seats 520	
Her Majesty's Theatre	219 Exhibition Street	1886	1,700	theatre, opera	Opened as the Alexandra Theatre	
Melbourne Town Hall	100 Swanston Street	1887	1,990	theatre, live music	Main Auditorium was rebuilt and enlarged in 1925	
Princess Theatre	163 Spring Street	1857	1,488	theatre, comedy	Opened as Astley's Amphitheatre in 1854, renovated as the Princess Theatre in 1857	
Regent Theatre	191 Collins Street	1929	2,143	theatre, opera	Former cinema reopened as a theatre in 1996	

=== Arts Precinct, Southbank ===
Name	Address	Opened	Seats	Use	Notes
Beckett Theatre, Coopers Malthouse	113 Sturt Street	1990	198	theatre	Converted from a brewery built in 1892
Chunky Move Studio	111 Sturt Street	2002	144	dance	Part of the Australian Centre for Contemporary Art
Fairfax Studio	100 St Kilda Road	1984	376	theatre	Part of the Theatres Building of the Arts Centre Melbourne
Hamer Hall	100 St Kilda Road	1982	2,466	live music, comedy, theatre	Part of Arts Centre Melbourne.
Hanson Dyer Hall	43 Sturt Street	2019	400	live music	Ian Potter Southbank Centre, Melbourne Conservatorium of Music
Iwaki Auditorium	120–130 Southbank Boulevard	1994	350	live music, events	Part of the ABC's Southbank Centre
The Lawler, Southbank Theatre	140 Southbank Boulevard	2009	150	theatre	Home of the Melbourne Theatre Company
Elisabeth Murdoch Hall	31 Sturt Street (cnr Southbank Boulevard)	2009	1,000	live music	Melbourne Recital Centre
Merlyn Theatre, Coopers Malthouse	113 Sturt Street	1990	512	theatre	Converted from a brewery built in 1892
The Palms at Crown	8 Whiteman Street, Southbank	1997	800	live music, comedy, theatre	Casino showroom
Primrose Potter Salon	31 Sturt Street (cnr Southbank Boulevard)	2009	136	live music	Melbourne Recital Centre
Federation Hall	234 St Kilda Road		221	live music, cinema	Part of the Victorian College of the Arts
Playhouse	100 St Kilda Road	1984	884	theatre	Part of the Theatres Building of the Arts Centre Melbourne
Sidney Myer Music Bowl	Kings Domain, St Kilda Road	1959	2,030	live music	Lawned area can hold an additional 10,000 patrons
State Theatre	100 St Kilda Road	1984	2,085	theatre, opera, live music	Part of the Theatres Building of the Arts Centre Melbourne
The Sumner, Southbank Theatre	140 Southbank Boulevard	2009	550	theatre	Home of the Melbourne Theatre Company
Tower Theatre, Coopers Malthouse	113 Sturt Street	2005	99	theatre	Converted from a brewery built in 1892
Plenary Hall, Melbourne Convention and Exhibition Centre	1 Convention Centre Place, South Wharf	2009	5541	theatre, live music	Can be divided into three smaller theatres

=== Independent/fringe ===
Notable venues for independent or fringe theatre in the Melbourne City Centre.

Name	Address	Opened	Seats	Use	Notes
Athenaeum Theatre 2	188 Collins Street	1979		comedy, theatre	Upstairs studio theatre at the Melbourne Athenaeum
The Butterfly Club	5 Carson Place	1999	76	cabaret, theatre, comedy	
fortyfivedownstairs	45 Flinders Lane	2002	120	theatre, live music	

== Inner-Melbourne ==
Name	Address	Opened	Seats	Use	Notes
Alex Theatre St Kilda	Level 1, 135 Fitzroy Street, St Kilda	2015	499	theatre, comedy	Theatre 1 with 499 seats and Theatre 2 with 291 seats
Brunswick Mechanics Institute	270 Sydney Road, Brunswick	1999	112	theatre	
Chapel Off Chapel	12 Little Chapel Street, Prahran	1995	255	theatre	
Dancehouse	150 Princes St, Carlton North	1992	104	dance	
Festival Hall	300 Dudley Street	1919	1,741	live music	Up to 5,445 capacity standing
Footscray Community Arts Centre	45 Moreland Street, Footscray		174	theatre, music, events	
Gasworks Arts Park	21 Graham Street, Albert Park	1992	192	theatre	
La Mama Theatre	205 Faraday Street, Carlton	1967	40	theatre	
La Mama Courthouse	349 Drummond Street, Carlton	1987	90	theatre	Former Carlton Courthouse built in 1887
Meat Market	5 Blackwood Street, North Melbourne	1880		theatre, dance, live art	Part of Arts House
Melba Hall	Royal Parade, Parkville	1913	340	Music	
Melba Spiegeltent	35 Johnston Street, Collingwood			circus, cabaret	
National Theatre	cnr Barkly & Carlisle Streets, St Kilda	1972	783	theatre, dance	Originally opened as the Victory Cinema in 1921
Northcote Town Hall	189 High Street, Northcote		350	theatre	
North Melbourne Town Hall	521 Queensberry Street, North Melbourne			theatre, dance, live art	Part of Arts House
Palais Theatre	Lower Esplanade, St Kilda	1927	2,896	theatre, comedy, live music	Largest seated theatre in Australia
The Plenary, MCEC	South Wharf	2009	5,540	live music, dance, events	Also configurations seating 1,482, 1,484 and 2,468
Red Stitch Actors Theatre	Rear, 2 Chapel Street, St Kilda East		80	theatre	
Richmond Theatrette	415 Church Street, Richmond		80–120	theatre	
Theatre Works	14 Acland Street, St Kilda	1985	144	theatre	
Thornbury Theatre	859 High Street, Thornbury			theatre	
Trades Hall	54 Victoria Street, Carlton		340		

== Suburban ==
Name	Address	Seats	Use	Notes
Frankston Arts Centre	27–37 Davey Street, Frankston	800	theatre, events, live music	Houses Victoria's second largest proscenium arch
The Bowery Theatre at St Albans Community Centre	Princess Street, St Albans	202	theatre, dance, live music, events	
Clocktower Centre	750 Mt Alexander Road, Moonee Ponds	503–545	theatre, conferences, events	
Whitehorse Centre	Rear of, 379–397 Whitehorse Road, Nunawading	408	theatre, live music	
Karralyka Theatre	Mines Road, Ringwood	430	theatre, live music	
Darebin Arts and Entertainment Centre	Cnr Bell Street & St Georges Road, Preston	385	theatre, events	
Wydnham Cultural Centre	177 Watton Street, Werribee	477	theatre, dance, live music	
Drum Theatre	Lonsdale Street & Walker Street, Dandenong	521	theatre, dance, live music	
Plenty Ranges Arts and Convention Centre	35 Ferres Boulevard, South Morang	497	theatre, events	
Robert Blackwood Hall	49 Scenic Boulevard, Clayton	1598	live music, events	Part of Monash University's Clayton campus
Alexander Theatre	49 Scenic Boulevard, Clayton	586	theatre, live music, dance	
George Wood Performing Arts Centre	Yarra Valley Grammar School, Kalinda Road, Ringwood	895	live music, events, dance	
George Jenkins Theatre	McMahons Road, Frankston	426	theatre, dance, conferences	Part of Monash University's Peninsula campus
Bunjil Place Theatre	2 Patrick Northeast Drive, Narre Warren	846	theatre, events, live music	
Bunjil Place Studio	2 Patrick Northeast Drive, Narre Warren	200	theatre, events	

== See also ==
- List of theatres in Sydney
- List of theatres in Hobart
