= Bijou Theatre, Melbourne =

Former theatre in Melbourne, Australia

Coordinates: 37°48′50.3″S 144°58′02.5″E

Bijou Theatre
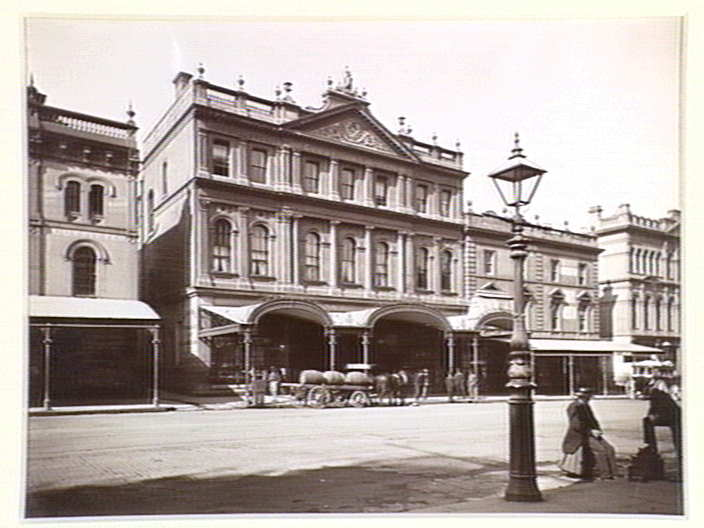
- Bijou Theatre, Melbourne
- Interactive map of the Bijou Theatre area

General information
- Location: Bourke Street, Melbourne
- Opened: 1876
- Demolished: 1934

The first theatre on the site at 217–223 Bourke Street, Melbourne was the Victorian Academy of Music, built for Samuel Aarons, which opened with a performance by Ilma de Murska on 6 November 1876. Seating about 1600, it was designed by Reed & Barnes, and located on a deep site, with the theatre at the rear, located above a wide passageway running through the site, called the Victoria Arcade. The arcade featured billiard and refreshment rooms, and access to the theatre was from a grand stair off Bourke Street, as well as stairs running off the arcade.

The first lessee was G. B. W. Lewis, who staged concerts and plays on alternate evenings, and in 1880 changed name to the Bijou Theatre, as if to distinguish it from the larger Theatre Royal and Opera House, in the same block. In June 1884 it was purchased for £47,000 by John Alfred Wilson (c. 1832–1915), who later developed the site next door as a hotel. Lewis was followed as lessee in 1885 by the Majeronis, who had often played in that theatre. Business was slow however, and when Majeroni fell behind in the rent, Wilson transferred the lease to Brough and Boucicault.

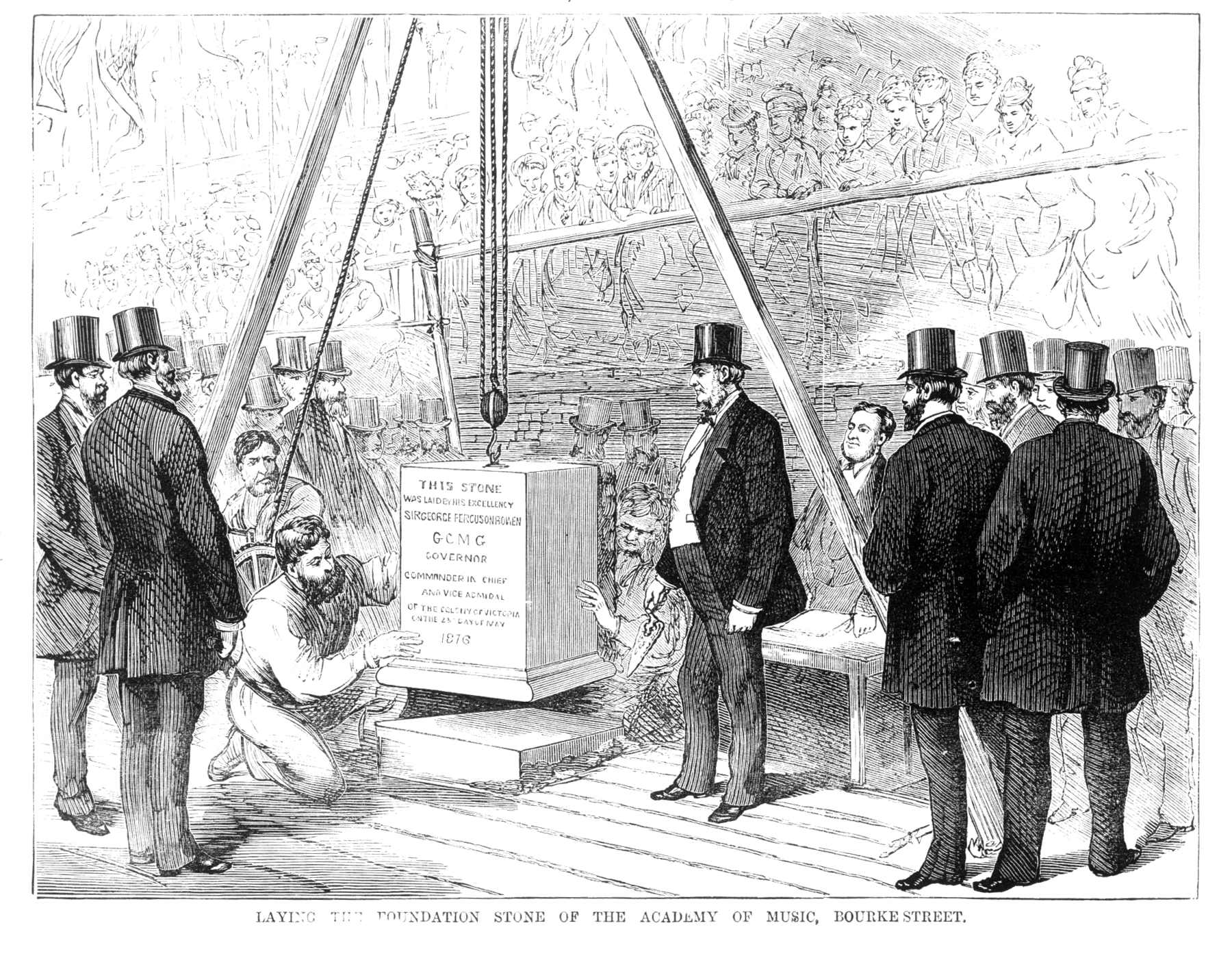
Wood engraving showing the laying of the foundation stone for the Academy of Music, June 12, 1876

In 1888–9, Wilson built the Palace Hotel next door, behind existing shops at 227–223 Bourke Street, accessed via the Victoria Arcade. The hotel included a very large dining room at ground level.

The Bijou Theatre was destroyed by fire on Easter Monday, 1889, which spared the hotel and the front part of the arcade. A new, larger Bijou Theatre seating up to 2000 with two balconies and six boxes was built on the site, designed by George Raymond Johnson, opening in early 1890. At the same time, the dining room of the Palace Hotel was refitted as a smaller theatre, the Gaiety, also accessed via the arcade.

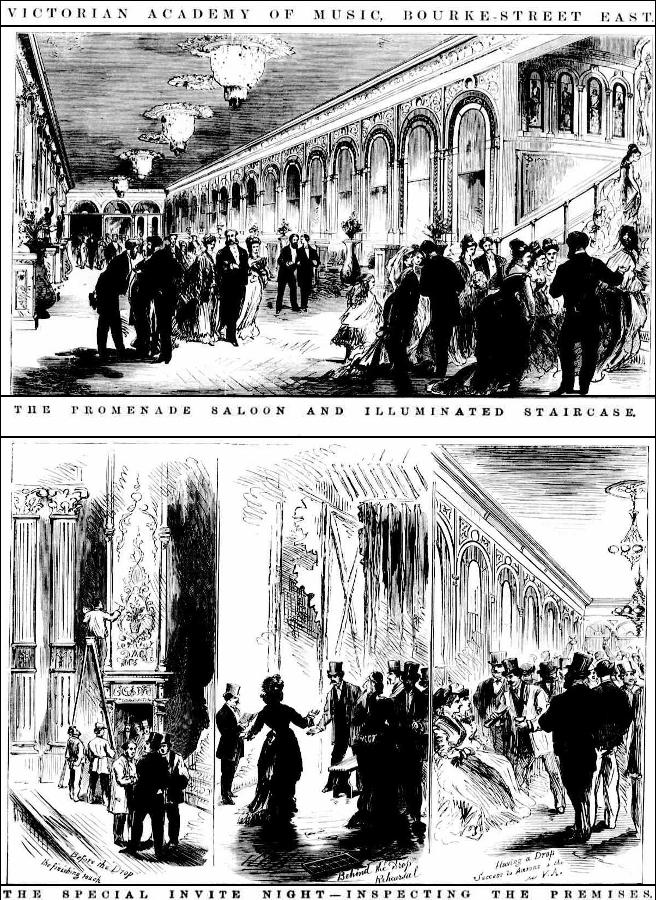
Scenes at the opening of the Academy of Music 1876

The Bijou was the scene of self-styled adventurer Louis De Rougement's brief appearance on the Australian stage in 1901— no sooner did he start to recount details of his amazing adventures than he was mercilessly howled down by the audience. The theatre was further renovated and altered in 1907. Later lessees included Harry Rickards and William Anderson. In 1915 Ben Fuller management bought the freehold of the Palace Hotel and the Gaiety, and the lease of the Bijou, and promoted it as the 'Home of Clean Vaudeville', with performers including 'Stiffy and Mo' and George Wallace. From 1929, Gregan McMahon and others subleased the theatre.

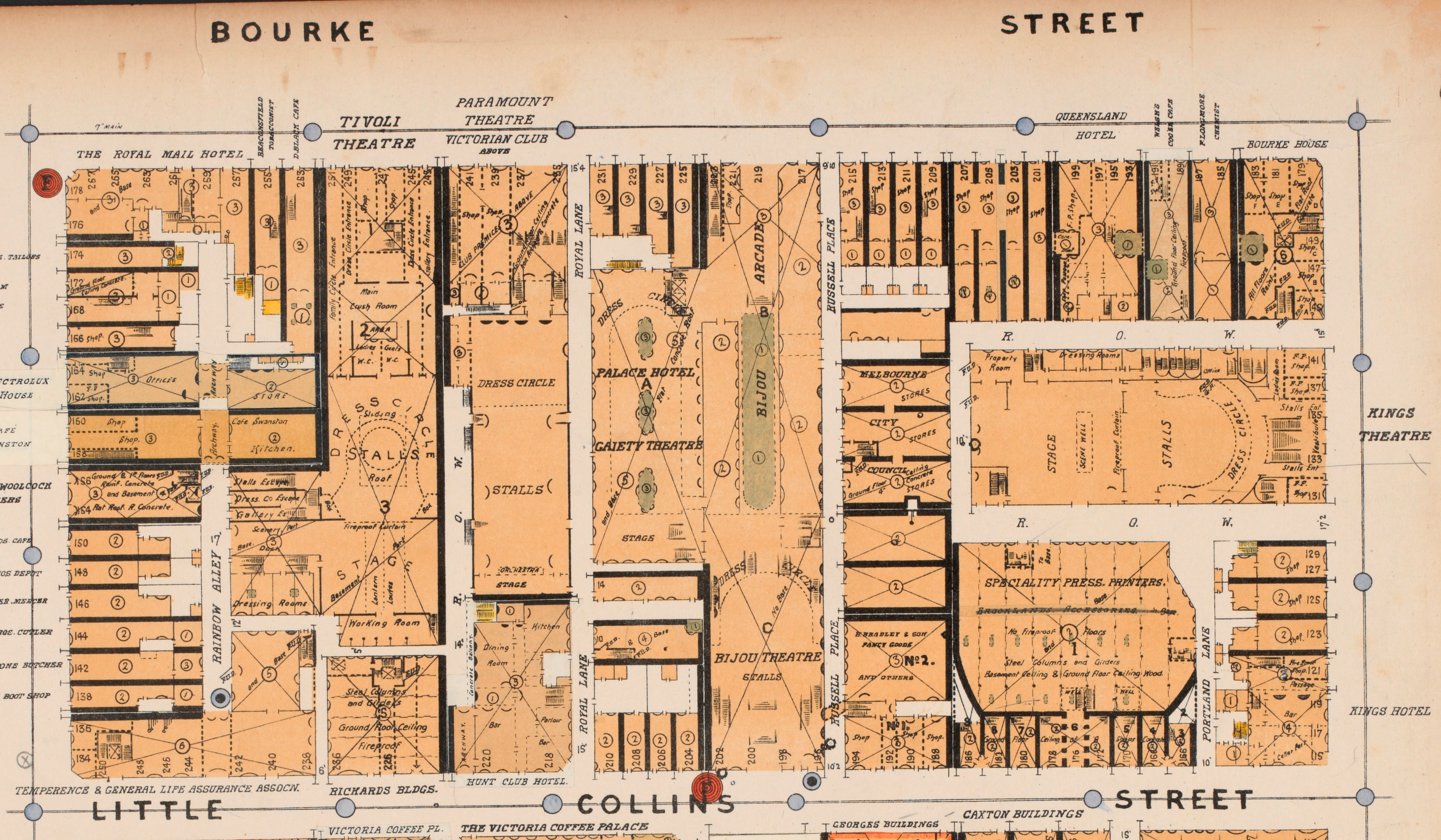
1923 Fire Insurance plan of the block of Bourke Street showing the Bijou and Gaiety Theatres and other theatres nearby.

In 1930, the Gaiety was converted to a full time cinema renamed the Roxy, with Fullers announcing grand plans for the whole complex, and closing the hotel. After weathering the Great Depression, with plans by Fullers to build a new large theatre and modern hotel, the theatres were closed and demolished along with the hotel starting in February 1934. The demolition came only a few months after the demolition of the Theatre Royal opposite, removing three live theatres from the one-time centre of Melbourne's entertainment district. The new venue never eventuated, and the façade was left standing until 1938, when the part of the site once occupied by the front portion of the arcade was sold to the Commonwealth Bank, which built a 10 storey bank and office building, completed in 1941. Fuller revived his plans after WWII, but the remainder of the site stayed vacant and used as a car park.
