= Steven J Fowler =

English poet (born 1983)

Steven J. Fowler
- Born: 1983 (age 42–43)
- Other name: SJ Fowler
- Occupations: Poet, writer and artist
- Known for: Founder of European Poetry Festival

Steven J. Fowler or SJ Fowler (born 1983) is a contemporary English poet, writer and avant-garde artist, and the founder of European Poetry Festival.

== Personal ==
Fowler studied Sociology at Durham University.

== Work ==
Fowler has produced a diverse body of work across poetry, performance, experimental theatre, visual poetry, concrete poetry and sound poetry, short stories and non-fiction.

He has received commissions from Tate Modern, BBC Radio 3, Whitechapel Gallery, Tate Britain, The London Sinfonietta, Wellcome Collection and Liverpool Biennial. Since 2012 he has been associate artist at Rich Mix Arts Centre, and since 2014 poet in residence at award-winning landscape architecture firm J&L Gibbons.

Fowler is lecturer in Creative Writing and English Literature at Kingston University, and has taught at Tate Modern, Poetry School and Photographer's Gallery. Fowler is the poetry editor at 3:AM Magazine.

=== Poetry ===
Since his debut in 2011, Fowler has published nine collections of poetry.

=== Visual art ===
His work with visual art reflects an active contemplation of the aesthetic qualities of language or linguistic mediums in concrete poetry, photo poetry, writing art, calligrams and asemic writing. Building on traditions like Dadaism and calligraphy art, it explores writing materials, the composition of handwriting and mark-making and the role of illustration and legibility in determining poetic meaning. He has been exhibited at the Victoria & Albert Museum, Southbank Centre, and in galleries in Vilnius, Berlin, Copenhagen, Lugano and Virginia.

=== Sound poetry ===
He featured in The Liberated Voice (2019) exhibition at Palais de Tokyo, which recounted the history of phonetic and sound poetry in the 20th and 21st century, and his other projects include Lunalia (2018), a collaboration with artist and opera singer Maja Jantar, Soundings, a project with Wellcome Library and several collaborations with celebrated improviser Phil Minton. He is a member of Minton's Feral Choir.

=== Performance ===
His work has become known internationally for his "innovation in the field of live literature", in a practice that reflects the ideas put forth by performance artists such as David Antin. Concerned with the potential of liveness, as opposed to the traditional poetry reading, Fowler's repertoire spans a diverse range of experimental practices, including improvised talking performances, action painting and pugilistica.

=== Film ===
The Animal Drums premiered at Whitechapel Gallery Cinema in December 2018, "charting the particular, baffled and morbid character of English attitudes to mortality". Projects prior to include Enthusiasm (2016) with Noah Hutton, which looks at the collision point between internal and external languages.

Disappearing Wormmood (2020), a collaboration with filmmaker Tereza Stehlikova, explored the overlooked aesthetic of Borough of Brent's Willesden Junction and Wormwood scrubs, "striving to see a closer place, alien, idiosyncratic and yet familiar".

=== Theatre ===
Two full-length plays, Dagestan (2015) and Mayakovsky (2017), were performed at Rich Mix, London. Dagestan was produced by Penned in the Margins. "Set in the shadowy world of global security", Dagestan invited the spectator to "enter the minds of private military contractors to uncover a culture of violence, gallows humour and moral uncertainty". Mayakovsky, commissioned by Dash Arts for the Rich Mix's centenary commemoration of the Russian Revolution, explored the life and death of Russian poet Vladimir Mayakovsky, a prominent figure of the Russian Futurist movement.

=== Curatorial projects ===
==== European Poetry Festival ====
Fowler is the founder and director of the European Poetry Festival. Since its inception, the festival has seen more than 100 European poets gather in front of audiences across UK and Ireland for events pioneering performance and collaboration in contemporary European literary and avant-garde poetry.

==== Writer's Centre Kingston ====
In 2017, Fowler was appointed director of Writers' Kingston, Kingston University's "literary cultural centre dedicated to creative writing in all its forms with an annual program of events from talks, to workshops and festivals".

==== Poem Brut ====
Fowler is founder and curator of Poem Brut, an initiative that has generated more than a dozen events since 2017, alongside multiple exhibitions, workshops, conferences and publications. Its aim is to "offer an alternative understanding of 21st-century literature" by "embracing text and colour, space and time, handwriting, composition, abstraction, illustration, sound, mess and motion, [to affirm] the possibilities of the page, the voice and the pen in a computer age".

==== Enemies Project and the Poetry Camarade ====
In 2013, Fowler launched the Enemies Project, which curates original collaborative works, performances and exhibitions between poets, artist, photographers, sculptures and other creative practitioners. His "Camarade" events asks pairs of poets, many of whom have never met before, to produce new collaborative works for the night of the reading.

=== Collaborations ===
In his own practice as well as his curatorial work, Fowler is a pioneer in collaborative inter-disciplinary practice. Collaborators include poets, artists, photographers, dancers, sculptors, film makers and writers. He has published two books based around the concept of collaborative practice: Enemies (2013) and its sequel Nemesis (2019).

== Selected bibliography ==
=== Poetry ===
- Come and See the Songs of Strange Days (Broken Sleep Books, 2021)
- I Will Show You The Life of the Mind (on prescription drugs) (Dostoyevsky Wannabe, 2020
- The Guide to Being Bear Aware (Shearsman Books, 2017)
- {Enthusiasm} (Test Centre, 2015)
- Dusk and Her Embrace (Thicket Press, 2015)
- The Rottweiler's Guide to the Dog Owner (Eyewear Press, 2014)
- Enemies: the selected collaborations of SJ Fowler (Penned in the Margins, 2013)
- Fights (Veer Books, 2011)
- Minimum Security Prison Dentistry (Anything Anymore Anywhere Press, 2011)
- Levels of Care, co-written with Krišjānis Zeļģis (Sampson Low, 2025)

=== Art books ===
- Sticker Poems (Trickhouse Press, 2021)
- Crayon Poems (Penteract Press, 2020)
- Aletta Ocean's Alphabet Empire (Hesterglock Press, 2018)
- I fear my best work behind me (Stranger Press, 2017)

== Selected collaborators ==
- Aase Berg
- Jerome Rothenberg
- Joe Dunthorne
- Sam Riviere
- Eirikur Orn Norddahl
- Morten Søndergaard
- Zoë Skoulding
- J. R. Carpenter
- Luke Kennard
- Phil Minton
- Maja Jantar
- Rebecca Kamen
- Lotje Sodderland
- Krišjānis Zeļģis
