= Krišjānis Zeļģis =

Latvian poet and brewer

- Born: 22 July 1985; Talsi, USSR, modern day Latvia
- Education: University of Latvia
- Occupations: Poet, Brewer
- Years active: 2001–present

Krišjānis Zeļģis (born 22 July 1985) is a Latvian poet and brewer.

== Biography ==
Krišjānis Zeļģis was born in Talsi in what was then the Latvian Soviet Socialist Republic, but today is Latvia. After finishing school he studied library science at the University of Latvia and worked as a light technician at the Latvian National Theatre. He has also had a variety of other jobs including picking grapes on a vineyard in France, and working as a builder on a stadium in Mexico. He later studied in the faculty of Geography and Land Sciences at the University of Latvia, where he earned a bachelor's degree in Earth Science. Currently he is a brewer, and co-owner, at the Latvian brewery Malduguns.

His poetry started to be published in different journals and online in 2001. His debut poetry book "Visas tās lietas" ("All Those Things") was published in 2010 and was nominated for a "Diena" annual culture prize and as a best debut in Latvian literature prize. He translated, alongside Ivars Šteinbergs, Aleksandra Meņšikova's poetry anthology "17 dzejoļi" ("17 Poems") from Russian into Latvian. In 2015 a small collection of Zeļģis's poems was published in a limited release of 25 copies under the title "Mīļākie" ("Loved Ones"). His poems have been translated into Russian by both Semjons Haņins and Jeļena Glazova. Zeļģis also writes prose and in 2016 he won a prize at the Latvian Prose Reading Festival for his story "Vectēvs" (Grandfather). He has been featured twice on poetry compilation CDs; on "Dzejas piegrieztne" in 2011 and "Robežstūmējs" in 2013.

Zeļģis's book "Zvēri" has been translated into English as part of the 'Parthian Baltic' project. It was released under the title "Beasts" in April 2018. The same year "Zvēri" was also translated into Catalan. It was released under the title "Bèsties" in December 2018 In 2020. there was yet another translation of "Zvēri" published. German publisher "Parasiten presse" based in Cologne published the German translation of the book under the title "Wilde tiere".

In 2016 Zeļģis also worked as a visual artist on the "Omega 3" exhibition in Mooste, Estonia.

In 2025 receives Jānis Baltvilks prize in children literature for his children poetry book "Patīk".

== Bibliography ==
=== Poetry ===
- "Visas tās lietas ("All Those Things"). Riga: Mansards, 2010.
- "Mīļākie" ("Loved Ones"). Riga: Ļoti, 2015.
- "Zvēri" ("Beasts"). Riga: Neputns, 2016.
- "Skaistuma klātbūtne" ("Presence of a beauty"). Riga: Neputns, 2020.
- "Pieaugušie" ("Grown ups"). Saldus: Valters un Dakša, 2021.
- "Patīk" ("I like"). Riga: Liels un mazs, 2024.
- "Levels of Care" (co–written with Steven J Fowler). London: Sampson Low, 2025

=== Translations ===
- "Я такими глупостями больше не занимаюсь" ("I don't do this silly stuff anymore"). Trans. to Russian Aleksandrs Zapoļs. Moscow: AGRO-RISK, 2016.
- "Beasts" ("Zvēri"). Trans. to English Jayde Will. Swansea: Parthian Books, 2018.
- "Bèsties" ("Zvēri"). Trans. to Catalan Xevi Pujol Molist. Girona: Curbet Edicions, 2018.
- "Wilde Tiere" ("Zvēri"). Trans. to German Adrian Kasnitz. Cologne: Parasiten presse, 2020.

=== Anthologies ===
- "Europoe". An anthology of 21st century innovative European poetry. London: Kingston University press, 2019.
- "Poezijos Pavasaris" Anthology. Vilnius: Lietuvos rašytojų sąjunga, 2019.
- "Ανθολογία Νέων Λετονών Ποιητών / Jauno Latviešu Dzejnieku Antoloģija" Athens: Vakxikon Publications, 2019.
- "Nemeses". Selected collaborations of SJ Fowler, Volume 2. London: HVTN Press, 2019.
- "Mind Túl Vagyunk A Határon": Baltic Poetry festival anthology. Budapest: Szépírók Társasága, 2019.
- "Introvertide ball", Läti luule antoloogia. Tallinn: Hea Lugu, 2022.
- "Versópolis. Nueva poesía Europea". Mexico: Círculo de Poesía, 2023.
- "Alfabeedi sünnimaa". Tallinn: Paranoia, 2024
