= Melbourne Arts Precinct =

Arts precinct in Southbank, Melbourne, Australia

Coordinates: 37°49′18″S 144°58′4″E

The Melbourne Arts Precinct is home to a series of galleries, performing arts venues and spaces located in the Southbank district of Melbourne, Victoria, Australia. It includes such publicly-funded venues as Arts Centre Melbourne, National Gallery of Victoria and Southbank Theatre, along with various offices and training institutions of arts organisations.

As of 2022 the precinct is undergoing a major transformation, including the build of Australia’s largest contemporary art gallery, The Fox: NGV Contemporary.

== History ==
In 2008, it was announced by the Government of Victoria the precinct would receive a A$128 million upgrade, with the major refurbishment of Hamer Hall as its centrepiece. The combined Melbourne Recital Centre and MTC Theatre complex, which opened in February 2009, won the Moore Stephens Award for Public Buildings at the Property Council of Australia - the country's highest award for a public building.

In 2014, the Victorian government released the Melbourne Arts Precinct Blueprint, initiated by the former state Premier and Minister for the Arts Ted Ballieu for a cost of $900,000 (given by both federal and state government). Led by Creative Victoria, its intention was to establish a vision for the precinct along with prioritising any future development.

In 2018, the Government of Victoria announced an initial $208 million investment in the first phase of a major redevelopment of the precinct, including a new contemporary art gallery, NGV Contemporary; significant upgrades to Arts Centre Melbourne’s State Theatre, back-of-house facilities, and critical maintenance works; and 18,000 m^{2} (190,000 sq ft) of new and renewed public space. This initial investment also included the purchase of the building at 77 Southbank Boulevard, to be demolished so NGV Contemporary could be built.

This investment was increased to $1.46 billion in the Victorian Budget 2020/21. and lifted further to $1.7 billion in November 2021.

== Description ==
The Melbourne Arts Precinct is located in Southbank, centred on St Kilda Road. It differs from the East End Theatre District in the city centre, as most of the galleries and venues in the precinct are publicly funded.

Administrative offices, broadcast studios, schools and training institutions of many arts organisations are also located in the precinct.

== Transformation project ==
The transformation project, which was announced in 2018, is being overseen by a new government corporation, the Melbourne Arts Precinct Corporation (MAP Co), which is also responsible for the revitalisation of Federation Square. Katrina Sedgwick, former CEO of ACMI, was appointed as the inaugural CEO of MAP Co in March 2022.

In April 2022, it was announced that the new gallery, part of the National Gallery of Victoria (NGV) would be named The Fox: NGV Contemporary, in recognition of a $100 million donation from Lindsay Fox and his wife Paula Fox.

The gallery is designed by Angelo Candalepas and Associates, leading a collective of 20 architectural, design and engineering firms which won a national competition.

== Public venues and galleries ==
- Arts Centre Melbourne, including Hamer Hall, the State Theatre, the Playhouse, the Fairfax Studio and other venues
- National Gallery of Victoria
- Various venues at the Victorian College of the Arts, including Grant Street Theatre, Space 28, Federation Hall and the Margaret Lawrence Gallery
- Buxton Contemporary
- Southbank Theatre
- Melbourne Recital Centre
- Iwaki Auditorium at the ABC Centre
- Australian Centre for Contemporary Art (ACCA), with its building also referred to as Ngargee (a Bunurong word for describing "gathering for celebration")
- The Coopers Malthouse
- Sidney Myer Music Bowl
- Federation Square, which is home to The Ian Potter Centre: NGV Australia, ACMI (formerly the Australian Centre for the Moving Image), and the Koorie Heritage Trust.

== Arts administration and education ==
- ABC Centre of the Australian Broadcasting Corporation, including
  - Studio 31
  - Melbourne Symphony Orchestra (MSO)
- The Australian Ballet, including the Australian Ballet School
- Chunky Move at ACCA
- Creative Victoria
- Melbourne Conservatorium of Music
- Melbourne Theatre Company (MTC).
- Malthouse Theatre
- Musica Viva
- Victorian College of the Arts (University of Melbourne)
- Victorian College of the Arts Secondary School (VCASS)

== See also ==
- List of theatres in the Melbourne City Centre
- Melbourne Arts Precinct Corporation
