= The Theatre Centre =

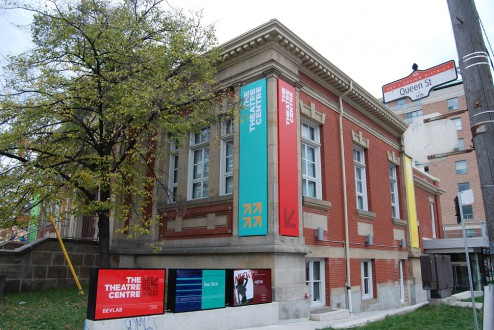

The Theatre Centre is a performing arts organization and theatre venue in Toronto . It is nationally recognized as a live-arts incubator for the cultural sector in the city, and also provides a meeting space for Toronto residents. The Theatre Centre's mission is to nurture artists, invest in ideas and champion new work and new ways of working.

The Theatre Centre is located on the traditional lands of the Anishinaabe, Haudenosaunee, and Huron-Wendat First Nation peoples.

== History ==
The B.A.A.N.N. Theatre Centre was formed in 1979 by a co-operative of five independent theatre companies – Buddies in Bad Times, Autumn Leaf Theatre, AKA Performance Interface, Necessary Angel, and Nightwood Theatre. These groups wanted a space to create, rehearse and present new works. By the mid-1980s, the founding companies had the Theatre Centre.

In 1984, the R+D (Research and Development) program was established and became the leading proponent for theatrical exploration in the city. In 2004, R+D was replaced by a two-year Residency Program. Over the years, The Theatre Centre has supported many companies, productions, artists and ideas. Artists participating in this program have included Jennifer Tarver, Chris Leavins, Sarah Garton Stanley, bluemouth inc., Ame Henderson, ATSA, Cathy Gordon, Independent Aunties, Juliet Palmer, Michael Rubenfeld, One Reed Theatre, Jon McCurley & Ame Lam, Susanna Hood, and Ravi Jain.

In 2002, The Theatre Centre presented its first Free Fall, a biennial festival for works from Canada and other countries.

Franco Boni has been the artistic director of The Theatre Centre since 2003.

In March 2014, Theatre Centre moved into the Carnegie Library building at 1115 Queen Street West following a $6.2 million redevelopment of the property.

== Activities ==
The Theatre Centre pursues a mandate of supporting artists who wish to develop works of an experimental or alternative nature, that challenge the definitions of theatrical performance by embracing music, dance, visual art and new media. The company provides space, mentorship, exposure and a sense of community through a series of carefully conceived programs.

== Café/Bar ==
The Theatre Centre Café/Bar provides refreshments and exhibits sculptural, video, and performance installations.

== Programs ==
=== Residency ===
The Theatre Centre's Residency Program is a structured two-year program that provides groups/artists with the necessary space, funding and mentorship to craft ideas into finished products. Residency facilitates a highly collaborative artistic process that brings together a variety of participants, both artists and non-artists.

Residency has its roots in the previous R&D programme, Participants in the R&D programme have included Tomson Highway, Daniel Brooks, Daniel MacIvor, Alisa Palmer, Darren O’Donnell, Alejandro Ronciera and Kelly Thornton.

=== Tracy Wright Global Archive ===
Launched in 2014 to honour the life of artist Tracy Wright, the Tracy Wright Global Archive is the project that challenges artists to explore a burning question and create a new work by engaging deeply with communities and locations across the globe.

In its first year, the Theatre Centre gave four Canadian theatre artists the opportunity to travel to four locations around the world to investigate their own burning question:

==== Prophecy Fog ====
As part of the Archive project. Jani Lauzon traveled to Giant Rock in the Mojave Desert near Landers, California. Prophecy Fog, a new project emerging from Lauzon's investigation of this space, weaves together the performance skills of Lauzon, with the expertise of projection designer Alex Williams and the compositions of award-winning composer Marsha Coffey, to elicit a conscious remembering of ancient prophecies that speak to rock teachings, star beings and earth changes.

==== Whose Revolution? ====
For his Archive project, Marcus Youssef arrived in Cairo on January 12, 2014, the evening of Egypt's third constitutional referendum since 2011. He left two weeks later, the day after the revolution's third anniversary. In between he was detained briefly by undercover police, witnessed his first car bomb, interviewed a dozen journalists, activists, academics and artists. He also spend time with his Egyptian family for the second time in his life. His question: what is a revolution? His current answer: a better question might be whose.

Whose Revolution? is part memoir of a family and exile, part snapshot of a country in the midst of massive change, and part investigation into what we can ever claim to actually know about another culture or place.

==== Walk When You Walk ====
For her Archive project Denise Fujiwara investigated the notion of walking as a medium for transformation. She visited the path of the Shikoku Pilgrimage on the island of Shikoku in Japan. Fujiwara invited small groups to walk in a contemplative way through The Theatre Centre's neighbourhood. Fujiwara shared perspectives and koans that aimed to allow participants to experience time, space and themselves in ways that belie the seeming simplicity of the act of walking.

==== What Happened to the Seeker? ====
For her Archive project, Nadia Ross went to India and asked the question What Happened to the Seeker? The project is a story told in three mediums: exhibit, video and performance. Her aim was to find out what happened to that original impulse and asks: how could that collective desire for truth end in such disappointment? As she walks the path of the original Seekers, she does comes face to face with the “thing that was never lost and that can never be found”, and shares her discovery in a story told in triptych form.

=== Progress Festival ===
Progress is an international festival of performance and ideas presented by the SummerWorks Performance Festival in partnership with The Theatre Centre. The festival is collectively produced by a series of Toronto-based curating companies, operating within a contemporary performance context.
