= Bluemouth inc. =

bluemouth inc.
- Formation: 1998
- Type: Theatre group
- Location(s): Toronto, Ontario, Canada, and New York City
- Website: www.bluemouthinc.live

bluemouth inc. is an experimental theater company known for creating immersive performance works. It holds split residence in New York City and Toronto and is an intersection of dance, performance art, visual media, electronic music, lyric poetry, and psychological realism. Collaborative and interdisciplinary in its approach, its hosts non-traditional theatrical and event-based performative productions.

== History ==
=== Early Works (1998 - 2008) ===
The company began in 1998 with the presentation of its first work, Mapping Currents, at the Edgy Women Festival in Montreal. In 2000, bluemouth inc. relocated to Toronto and officially incorporated.

In 2002, the company started work on a new project called Something About a River, which took place at three locations along the buried Garrison Creek in Toronto. This work was eventually presented as a complete five-hour performance entitled Something About a River and was nominated for six Dora Mavor Moore Awards winning for Outstanding Independent Production.

The Memory of Bombs was developed the following year through a residency at the Theatre Centre in Toronto and workshopped at the 2004 Summerworks Theatre Festival. This project was then revised and presented under its new title – How Soon is Now – the following year during the Theatre Centre's site-specific season. It was subsequently nominated for five Dora awards.

At the same time, the company began disseminating its work internationally by remounting a number of projects in New York City. From 2005 to 2009 the company remounted Lenz, What the Thunder Said, American Standard, Death by Water, and How Soon is Now.

=== Dance Marathon (2009) ===
In 2008, the company was awarded a Fresh Ground New Works commission from Harbourfront Centre for the creation of Dance Marathon, a duration-based immersive performance inspired by the dance marathons of the Great Depression. This piece was developed in Toronto and at Montreal's Place Des Arts and premiered at Harbourfront's World Stage Festival in February 2009.

Following its premiere, Dance Marathon toured extensively, including The Cork MidSummer Festival, Ireland (2009), the Winter Olympics in Vancouver (2010), APAP Festival, New York City (2010), Dance Massive, Melbourne & Ten Days on the Island, Tasmania (2011), The Edinburgh Festival Fringe, The Traverse Theatre, Scotland (2011), Dance Umbrella, BITE Barbican Centre, London (2011), World Stage, Harbourfront Centre, Toronto (remount 2012), Norwich Norfolk Festival, Norfolk-Norwich, UK (2013), Magnetic North Festival, Halifax, Canada (2014), Mayfest, in Bristol, UK (2015) and the fabrik Festival, in Potsdam, Germany (2015).

=== It Comes in Waves (2015) ===
It Comes in Waves premiered on Toronto Island from July 13–24, 2015, as a co-production between Necessary Angel Theatre Company, bluemouth inc., and PANAMANIA. Written by Jordan Tannahill with bluemouth inc. and directed by Jennifer Tarver, the production was created as an immersive, site-specific journey exploring themes of memory, transformation, and communal ritual.

Audiences began the experience on a ferry ride and were guided across various locations on the island, blurring boundaries between performer and observer. Jennifer Tarver, Necessary Angel's Artistic Director, noted: "They made space alive and unpredictable, disarming all expectations of behaviour, the nature of meaning, and the audience/performer relationship." "It Comes in Waves". Necessary Angel Theatre Company.

The production featured long-time bluemouth collaborators including Stephen O’Connell, Lucy Simic, Ciara Adams, and Richard Windeyer, and incorporated live music by Gabi Charron-Merritt and immersive visual and spatial design by Andjelija Djuric and Patrick Lavender. The performance was praised for its sensory richness and atmospheric storytelling, and its lighting design by Patrick Lavender received a Dora Mavor Moore Award for Outstanding Lighting Design in 2016. "It Comes in Waves". Necessary Angel Theatre Company.

=== Café Sarajevo (2020) ===
Café Sarajevo premiered at the M1 Singapore Fringe Festival , before being presented at Toronto's Theatre Centre as part of the Progress Festival in 2020. Created and Performed by Mariel Marshall, Peter Musante, Lucy Simic and Stephen O’Connell, it was staged in a black box studio space and framed as a live podcast recording. The performance centered around company member Lucy Simic being interviewed about her return to Sarajevo, the city of her heritage, twenty years after the Bosnian War. The audience, equipped with bluetooth headphones, listened to a combination of live dialogue, background scoring, and sound effects. Audience members were invited to participate by reading dialogue from scripts on music stands, acting as locals Simic met in Sarajevo. In one scene, volunteers represented England and Croatia in a simulated World Cup match, emphasizing both shared play and sudden trauma as simulated explosions disrupted the scene.

Audience members also used personal virtual reality viewers showing documentary footage from Simic's trip. As described by scholars Jenn Stephenson and Mariah Horner in Play: Dramaturgies of Participation, these immersive techniques cultivated "proximal and social intimacy," encouraging the audience to embody and reflect on themes of division, belonging, and forgiveness.

=== Game of Life (2025) ===
Game of Life premiered at The Theatre Centre in Toronto in March 2025. The work consists of two parts:

Elephant: A participatory performance incorporating storytelling, dance, games, music, and food.

Lucy AI: An interactive installation created in collaboration between bluemouth inc. and ReImagine AI, led by David Usher, based on the memories and voice of company member and co-founder Lucy Simic.

The piece draws on Simic's experiences living with Stage 4 cancer. In her review, Paula Citron called Game of Life "wildly imaginative in concept and uniquely inventive in execution" and noted its fusion of multiple art forms. She described the work as "a testament to [the artists] and to their reverence for the healing power of their art."

== Leadership ==
- Stephen O’Connell (Co-founder & Core Member)
- Lucy Simic (Co-founder & Core Member)
- Lisa Humber (Core Member)
- Mariel Marshall (Core Member)

== Awards and honors ==
bluemouth inc. has been nominated for 13 Dora Mavor Moore awards, and won 3, the first was in the category Outstanding Independent Play for "Something About a River" (2004), and second was for Outstanding Lighting Design by Patrick Lavender, for "It Comes in Waves" (2016) and Outstanding Innovative Experience for "Game of Life" (2025).
