= Melbourne Arts Precinct Corporation =

Organisation running Australian arts project

The Melbourne Arts Precinct Corporation (MAP Co) is a Victorian Government corporation responsible for the $1.7 billion transformation of the Melbourne Arts Precinct.

MAP Co also operates Federation Square and will operate the new 18,000 square metre public space that will be built in the precinct.

MAP Co was established in 2022, with Katrina Sedgwick appointed as its inaugural CEO in March 2022.

The Melbourne Arts Precinct transformation will include the construction of a new gallery – The Fox: NGV Contemporary – that will connect with NGV International and Arts Centre Melbourne by the new 18,000 sqm public space.

== Directors of MAP Co ==
The board of directors of MAP Co, announced in July 2022, is:

- James MacKenzie (chair)
- Peter Konidaris (deputy chair)
- Cath Bowtell
- Aneetha de Silva
- Belinda Duarte
- Tony Ellwood
- Ari Suss
- Christine Wyatt

== See also ==
- Federation Square
- Melbourne Arts Precinct
