= Rebecca Kamen =

American sculptor

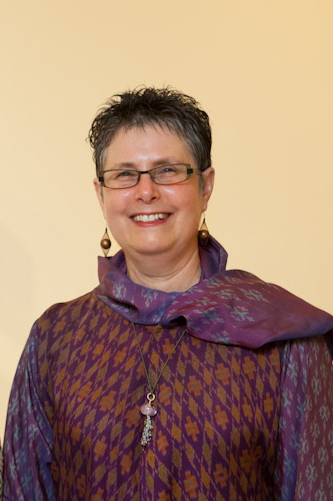
- Born: 1950 (age 74–75); Philadelphia, Pennsylvania, U.S.
- Occupation: Artist
- Website: rebeccakamen.com

External videos
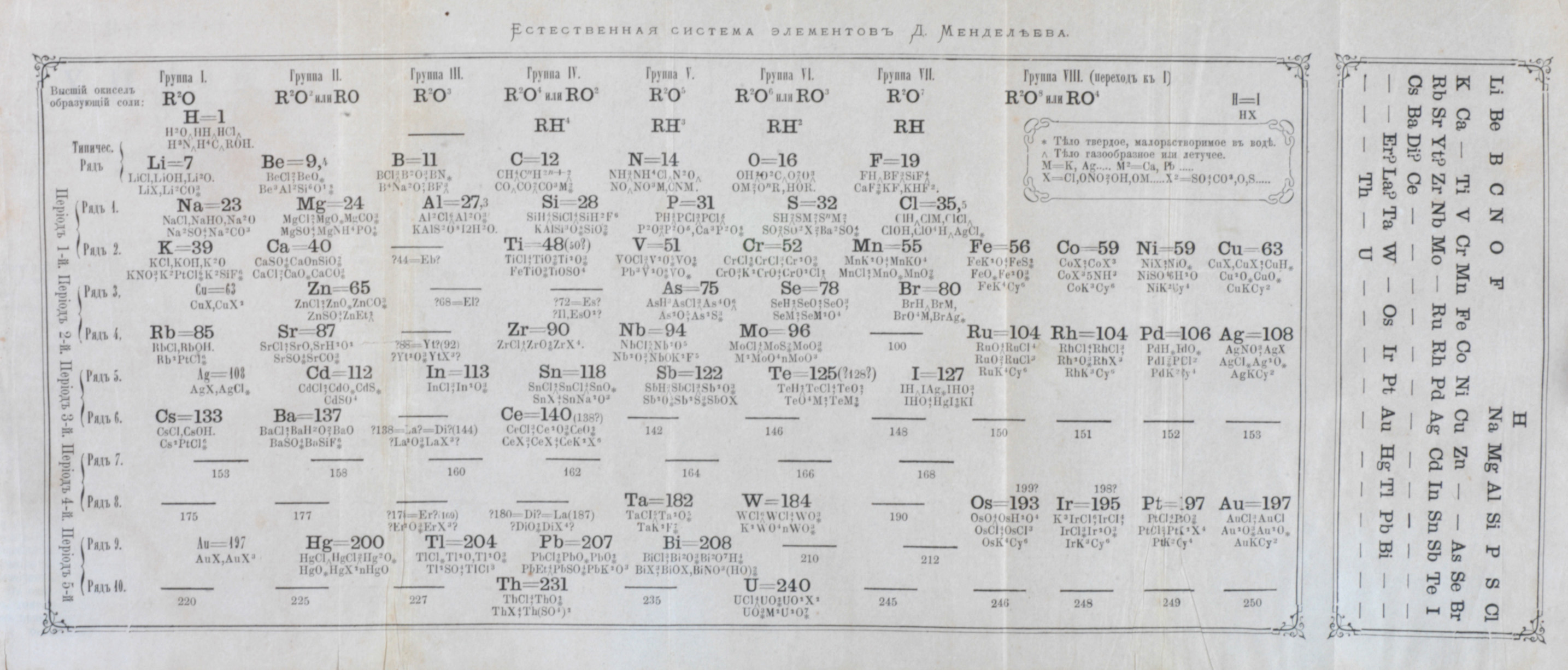
- "Bridging Art and Science: Rebecca Kamen at TEDxChristiansburg", September 22, 2012, TEDx Talks
- "Rebecca Kamen - Divining Nature"
- "Rebecca Kamen and Discoveries"

Rebecca Kamen (born 1950) is an American artist. Kamen's artwork is influenced and inspired by scientific work in many areas, from medieval alchemical manuscripts to the periodic table, to theories of black holes. Informed by science, her works attempt to illuminate its hidden beauty.

Kamen is professor emeritus at Northern Virginia Community College (NOVA) where she taught for over 35 years. She continues to be involved with STEM education and consulting nationally. She has exhibited nationally and internationally, and her works are included in many private and public collections. She has received a number of awards and honors.

== Early life and education ==
Born in Philadelphia, Pennsylvania, Kamen experienced difficulty in both school and college because of dyslexia, which was not diagnosed until much later in her life. Dyslexia is a neurological condition that causes difficulties in reading and mathematics, but may enhance some visual processing abilities. Kamen was fascinated by science, but her difficulties with reading and math convinced her not to pursue a scientific career. College counselors questioned whether she was intelligent enough to attend college, and she was admitted on probation. She chose to study art education at Pennsylvania State University in part because it did not require classes in math, a subject that is often difficult for dyslexic people. Kamen earned a B.S. in art education from Pennsylvania State University in 1972.

Creating artwork enabled Kamen to use haptic skills, engaging her sense of touch to perceive and remember objects. Kamen went on to receive an M.A. in art education from University of Illinois at Urbana, (1973) and a Master of Fine Arts degree in sculpture from the Rhode Island School of Design (RISD) in 1978.

== Teaching ==
Beginning in 1978, Kamen taught at Northern Virginia Community College (NOVA). In 1985, Kamen made the first of many trips to China. After meeting noted Chinese sculptor Zhao Shu Tong, Kamen began a six-year collaborative cultural exchange project teaching children about science, art, and American and Chinese culture. Many of her subsequent works have been influenced by Chinese and Japanese art and gardens.

After more than 35 years, she officially retired from teaching. She continues to be involved with the STEM to STEAM initiative in Virginia, Maryland, and the District of Columbia. She has organized the Aspiring Science Summer Internship Program (ASSIP) at George Mason University, where summer interns work in cross-disciplinary teams doing hands-on scientific research, and interpret their research artistically. The program emphasizes the commonality of creative work in the sciences and the arts. She has been a consultant for the development of online chemistry courses by Harvard University's Science Media Group. She is a speaker in the USA Science & Engineering Festival's Nifty Fifty speaker series.

== Awards and honors ==
In 2001 Kamen was awarded a President's Sabbatical Award from Northern Virginia Community College. She has been the recipient of a Virginia Museum of Fine Arts Professional Fellowship, a Pollack Krasner Foundation Fellowship, a Strauss Fellowship, an NIH Artist in Residency, VCCS Professional Development Grants, and a Travel Grant from the Chemical Heritage Foundation.

In 2011, Kamen received a Chancellor's Commonwealth Professorship from the Virginia Community College System. She has partnered with academic and scientific research institutions throughout the United States, including Harvard University, the Massachusetts Institute of Technology, the National Institutes of Health, and George Mason University.

In 2012, Kamen was awarded a fellowship from the National Institutes of Health.

In 2017 she was an Artist-in-Residence at the McColl Center for Art + Innovation.

== Artworks ==
Kamen believes that artists and scientists have similar missions, searching for meaningful patterns and attempting to create compelling narratives about invisible worlds. She is interested in the revelatory role of scientific discovery. The following are some of her works:

=== Divining Nature: An Elemental Garden ===
Her work Divining Nature: An Elemental Garden transformed the Periodic Table into a sculptural garden of 3-dimensional mylar flowers, arranged in a Fibonnaci-like spiral. Each of the 83 naturally occurring atoms is represented by a flower. Details of each flower's petals convey information about the orbitals of the elements. The mylar orbital petals are supported by fiberglass rods to create pagoda-like 3 forms. The work grew out of a two-year period of research in which Kamen was influenced by Mendeleev's original periodic table, by travels in India and Bhutan, by Buddhist mandalas, and by medieval alchemy books. The full exhibit, with The Platonic Solids, first appeared at the Greater Reston Arts Center, Reston, VA- (2009). It has since been acquired by George Mason University Department of Science for permanent installation in the atrium of the science building.

=== The Platonic Solids ===
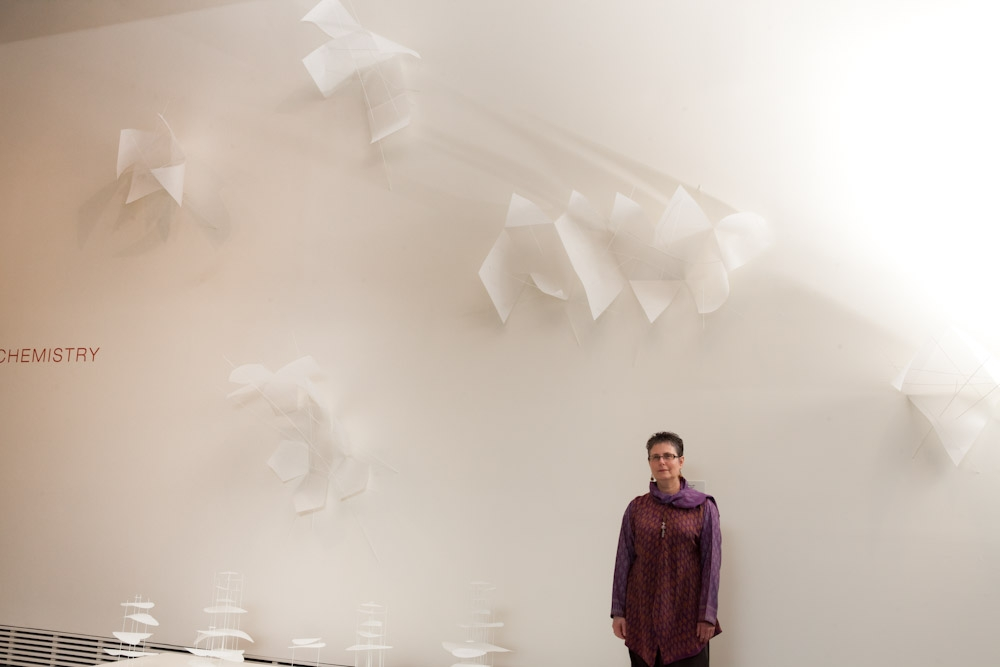
Rebecca Kamen in front of her installation The Platonic Solids at the Chemical Heritage Foundation, 2011

The Platonic Solids was inspired by Plato's conception of the five classical elements: earth, air, fire, water, and ether. In Plato's work Timaeus (c. 350 BCE), the five forms of matter are related to elemental solids and shapes (the cube, the octahedron, the -tetrahedron, the icosahedron, and the dodecahedron). In Kamen's work these regular polyhedra, created from fiberglass rods and sheets of mylar, are held against the larger plane of the wall, demonstrating "tension and compression". The work appeared in 2011 as part of the exhibit Elemental Matters: Artists Imagine Chemistry, at the Chemical Heritage Foundation, Philadelphia, PA. It was accompanied by a sound component by bio-musician Susan Alexjander, Elements in Descending Order of Creation from Collapsing Stars. The exhibit also included Kamen's sculpture Hydrogen, Helium, Carbon, Nitrogen, Oxygen, Silicon, Phosphorus, Sulfur.

=== Butterflies of the Soul ===
In 2012, Kamen was awarded a fellowship from the National Institutes of Health, and spent a summer visiting and talking to scientists in their laboratories in Bethesda, Maryland. That knowledge became the basis for a series of artworks, inspired by the brain, which were shown at the Porter Neuroscience Research Center.

Kamen's work, Butterflies of the Soul was inspired by neuroscientist Santiago Ramon y Cajal, who won the 1906 Nobel Prize, for his examination of the human nervous system. Cajal observed cells under the microscope, a new approach to the study of the brain and its functions. In Kamen's sculpture, threadlike mylar "butterflies" perch on intertwining translucent green mylar and acrylic "branches". The result is reminiscent of neural structures. Kamen's sculpture is inspired by Cajal's drawings of Purkinje cells, which are involved in motor control and cognitive functions.

== Exhibitions ==
Kamen has participated in a substantial number of solo and group exhibitions. Her first solo exhibition was in 1980, at the University of Richmond, Virginia. In 2014, she held a 20-year retrospective solo exhibition at Duke Hall Gallery, James Madison University. Fundamental Forces, an exhibition of sculpture and painting with sound artist Susan Alexjander, focused on the four fundamental forces in physics, is on display at the National Academy of Sciences to July 6, 2015.

In the 2021 multi–media exhibition Creative Resilience: Art by Women in Science, produced by the Gender Section of the United Nations Educational, Scientific and Cultural Organization (UNESCO), Kamen's artwork "Corona and Illumination", an acrylic painting inspired by colorized SARS-CoV-2 electron microscopic images, and biographical information were featured along artworks by more than 50 other women from around the globe working in science and art.
