= Dancehouse (Melbourne) =

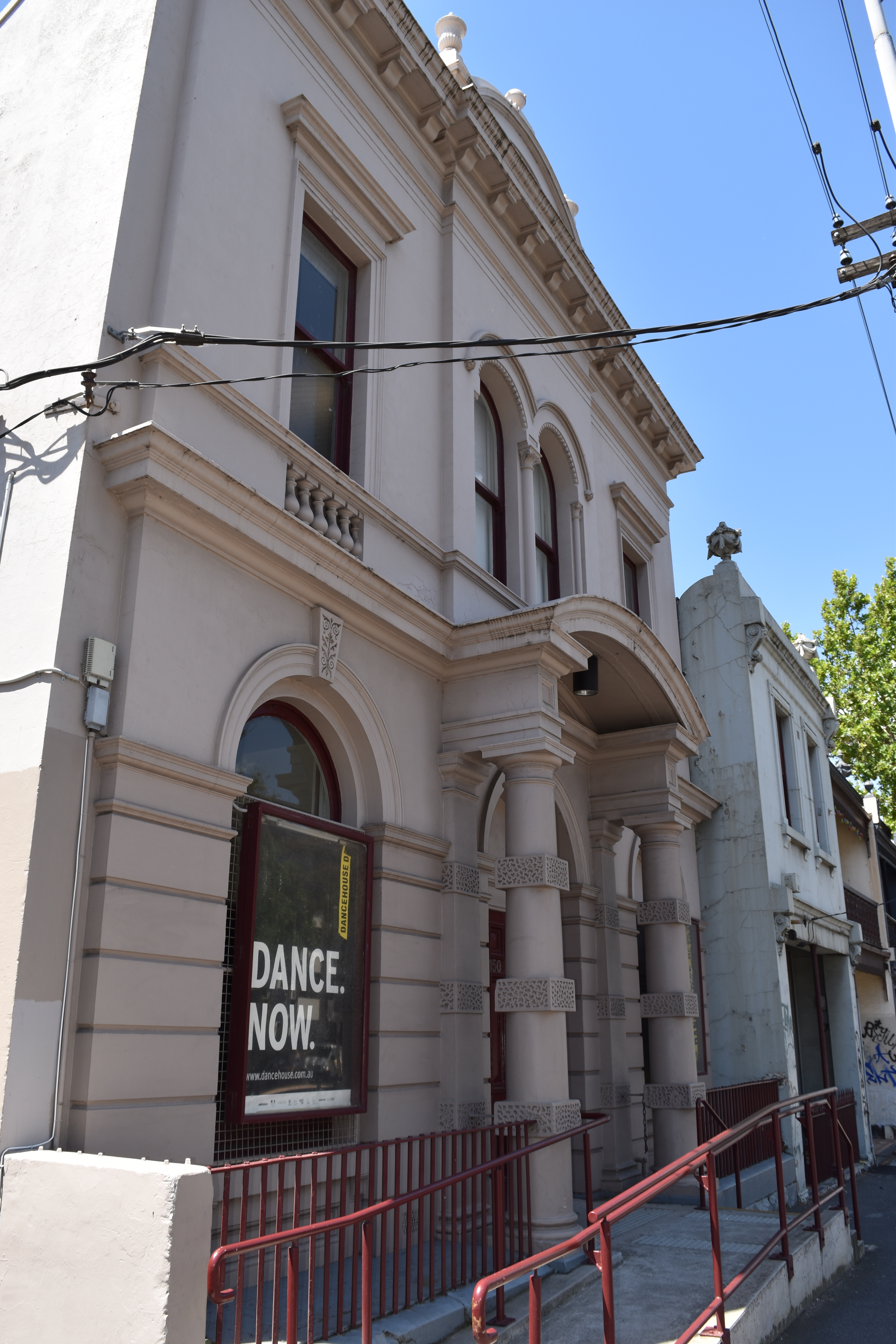
- Interactive map of Dancehouse
- Address: 150 Princes Street
- Location: Carlton North, Victoria
- Coordinates: 37.792169°S 144.9704912°E

Dancehouse is a centre for independent contemporary dance in the Carlton North area of Melbourne, Australia.

It was established in 1992 by a group of independent dance practitioners at the Carlton Hall in Princes Street, formerly occupied by the Carlton Community Centre. Carlton Hall, built in 1877, has a long association with dance as a venue for social dances, dance classes and dance performance.

Dancehouse contains three spaces: the 104-seat Sylvia Staehli Theatre, an Upstairs Studio and a gallery (used for performances and workshops). It holds curated performance seasons and residencies for dance artists, as well as masterclasses and other events.

It presents Melbourne's biennial Dance Massive festival with Arts House and Malthouse Theatre, and is also involved with the Keir Choreographic Award.
