= Gaiety Theatre, Melbourne =

Australian theatre

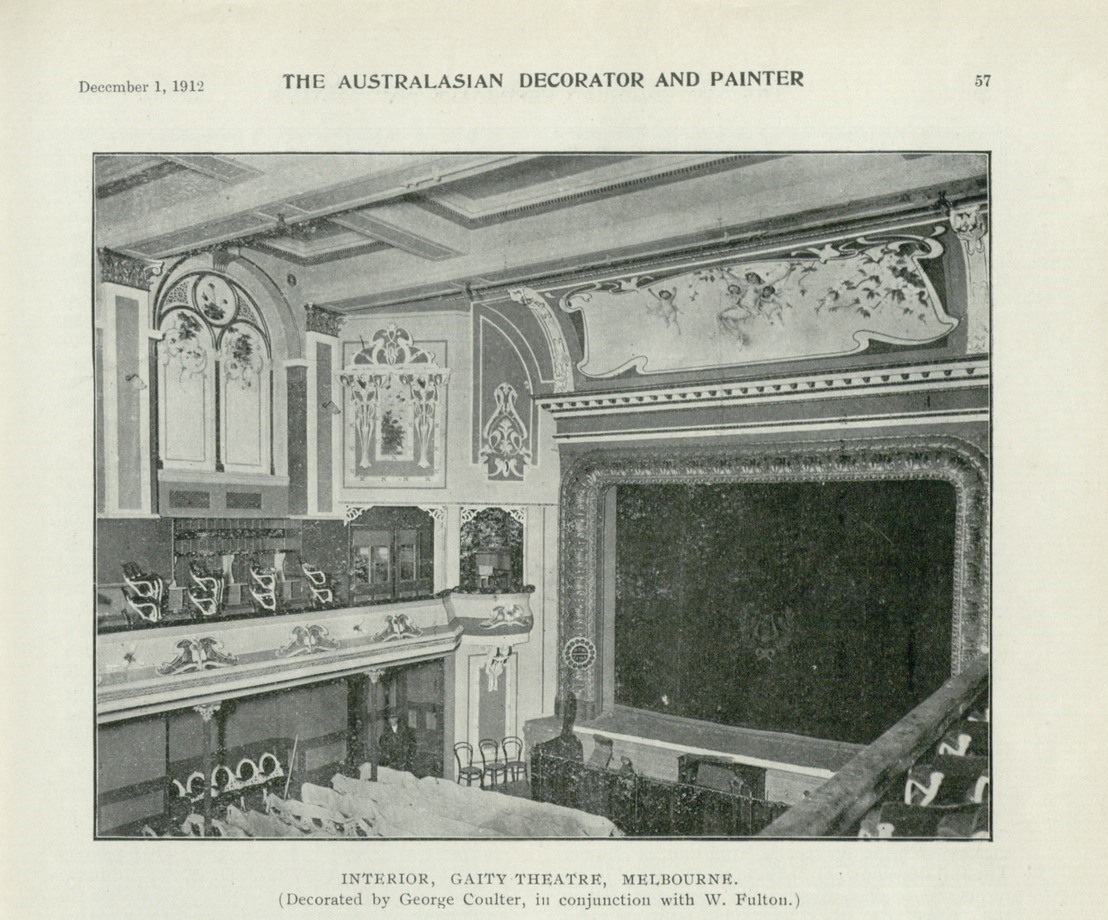
Interior of the Gaiety after a redecoration in 1912

The Gaiety Theatre was a theatre in Melbourne, Australia, which operated from 1889 to 1930, when it became the Roxy movie theatre until it was demolished in 1934.

== History ==
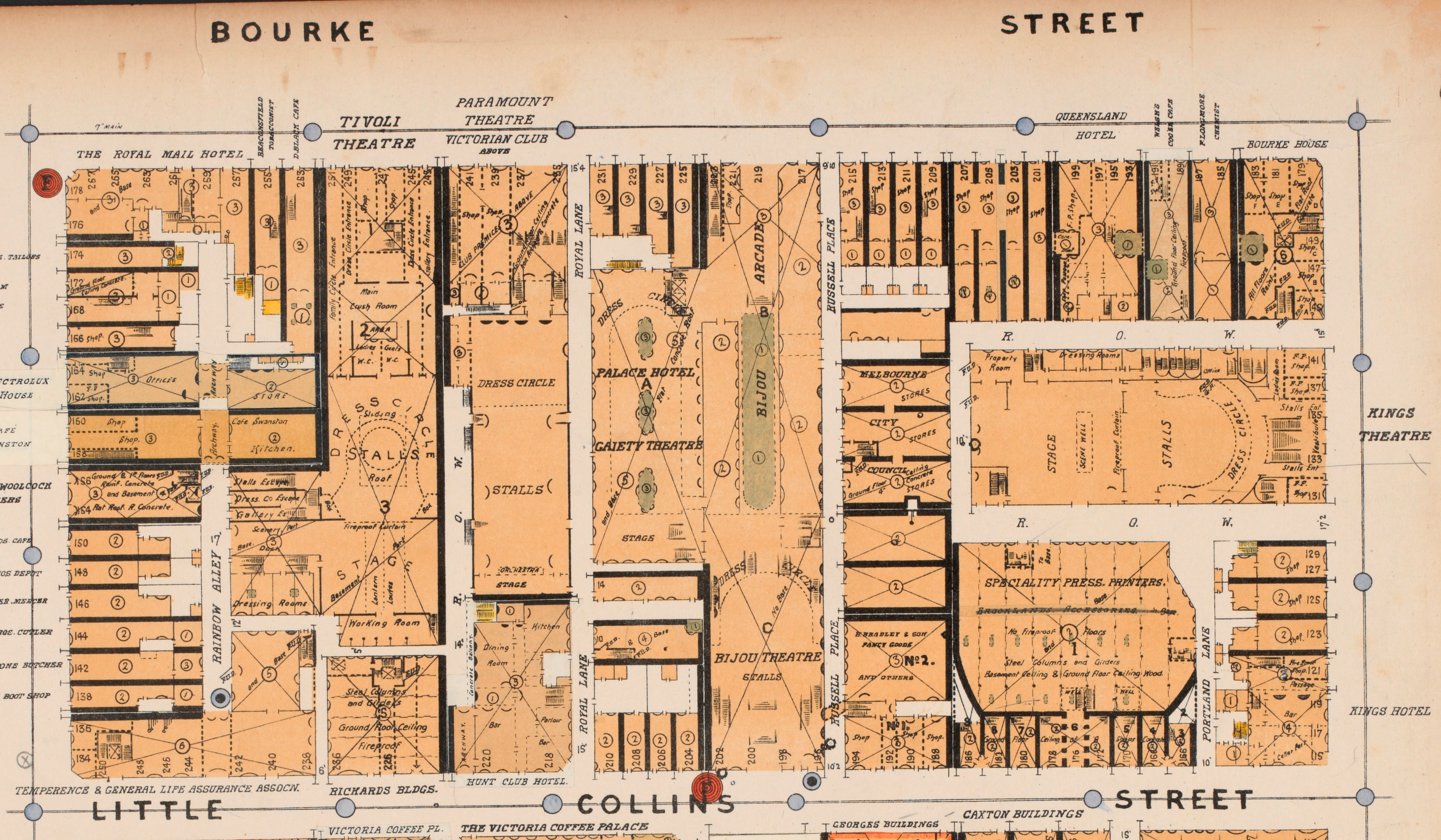
Plan of the block of Bourke Street in 1923 showing the Gaiety and the Bijou in the centre, and other theatres.

The history of the Gaiety is connected to that of the Bijou Theatre at 217-223 Bourke Street, which began as the Academy of Music in 1876, set at the very rear of the site, accessed via the Victoria Arcade. Renamed the Bijou in 1880, it was bought in 1880 by John Alfred Wilson (c. 1833–1915), who had made a fortune in gold mining, and had a wide range of business interests. In 1888 or 1889 Wilson bought the adjacent site and built the Palace Hotel, with a large dining room at ground level, both accessed from the Victoria Arcade. In 1890 the Bijou was destroyed by fire, and immediately rebuilt to a larger scale, and at the same time the Palace Hotel dining room was refitted as a theatre, called the Gaiety. The architect for both was George Johnson.

After a succession of lessees, in 1915 the freehold of the Palace Hotel and Gaiety, along with the lease of the Bijou, was bought by theatrical entrepreneur Ben Fuller. By this time, the Gaiety often showed films as well as live acts, and in the 1920s was operated by Hoyts as the New Gaiety. In 1930, it was refurbished for talking pictures and renamed the Roxy movie theatre, as part of plan for a larger development of the two theatres. The hotel was closed in 1929, and having weathered the Great Depression, Fullers demolished the Bijou, the Roxy and the hotel for his grand scheme in 1934, which never eventuated. Instead, the site was subdivided, with the section once occupied by the front part of the arcade was sold to the Commonwealth Bank in 1938 for a 10 storey office building, completed in 1941, while the site of Bijou theatre itself and of the Palace Hotel and Gaiety Theatre remained vacant and used as a carpark.
