= Dance Massive =

Dance Massive is a festival for Australian contemporary dance. It is held in Melbourne every two years, generally in March.

Dance Massive was first held in 2009, originally established by Arts House, Dancehouse and the Malthouse Theatre. It has since expanded to also include events at venues such as Abbotsford Convent, Temperance Hall and The SUBSTATION.
