= Tivoli Theatre, Melbourne =

Venue in Melbourne's East End Theatre District

Coordinates: 37.813627°S 144.966602°E

The Tivoli Theatre was an important venue in Melbourne's East End Theatre District, located at 249 Bourke Street near Swanston Street. The first theatre on the site opened in 1866, rebuilt in 1872 as the Prince of Wales Opera House, rebuilt again in 1901 as the New Opera House, and renamed the Tivoli in 1914 when it joined the Tivoli circuit. The theatre closed in 1966.

== Early years ==
Following the Victorian gold rush, Melbourne became a sizable thriving city, and the area of Bourke Street near Swanston developed as the theatre and entertainment precinct. One such venue was the Australia Hall, a small variety theatre built above livery stables. It opened on 2 November 1866, described as "of the exceedingly unpicturesque order of architecture." It was eventually redecorated and rechristened several times, before burning down in 1869.

Three years later, in 1872, a new theatre was erected on the site by Henry Hoyt (omnibus and tramway pioneer), designed by George H. Johnson. Opening on 24 August, the Prince of Wales Opera House was a large, four–level auditorium seating 2,500 patrons. Its first lessee was opera impresario William Saurin Lyster.

== Harry Rickards ==
In 1893, British actor-manager Harry Rickards bought the Garrick Theatre in Sydney, which he renamed the Tivoli, and presented music hall style entertainments. In 1895, he expanded into Melbourne, taking on the lease of the Opera House, establishing the beginnings of the Tivoli circuit. He became known for importing international talent such as Charles Godfrey Leland, Ada Reeve, Marie Lloyd and W. C. Fields.

== New Opera House ==
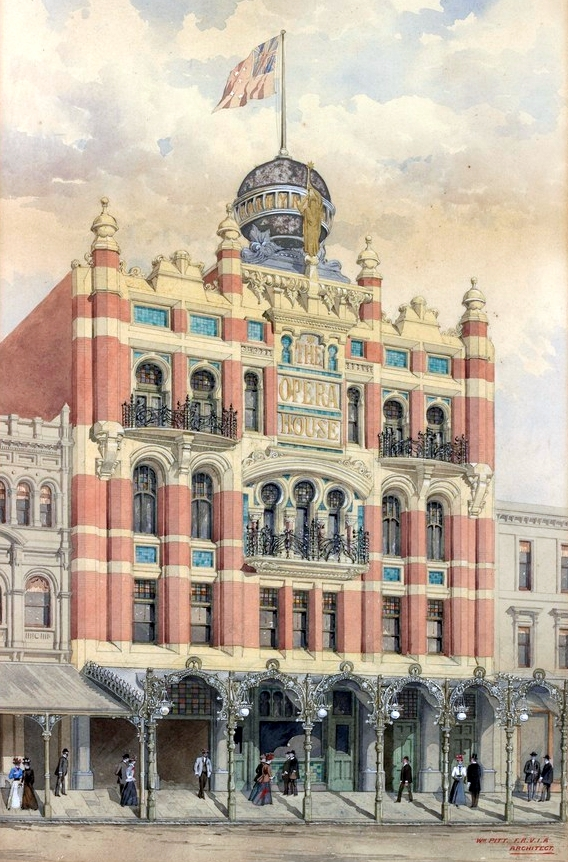
Facade illustration of the New Opera House, Melbourne, 1900. Source: State Library of Victoria.

At the turn of the century, safety concerns forced the closure and eventual demolition of the Opera House. Rickards commissioned the Melbourne architect William Pitt to design a replacement, and the New Opera House opened in May 1901 with a bill headed by British comedian Marie Lloyd. Designed in a broadly Edwardian style, with tall arches and red brick and cement render detailing, it included keyhole arches of the rarely used exotic Moorish style, and featured a landmark illuminated globe on the roof. The auditorium, over three levels, featured more elaborate Moorish style decoration. Rickards died in London in 1911, leaving a circuit that had expanded into theatres in Adelaide, Brisbane and Perth, which was Australia's major presenter of vaudeville.

The New Opera House, as well as the Tivoli business, was sold to boxing entrepreneur Hugh D. McIntosh. In 1914, in line with the other venues on the circuit, the New Opera House was renamed the Tivoli.

== Tivoli, the home of variety ==
For the next half-century, the Tivoli was Melbourne's home of variety, presenting both local and international performers, including Winifred Atwell, Sophie Tucker, Tommy Trinder, Nelson Eddy, and Tommy Steele. French dancer and model of the first bikini, Micheline Bernardini, appeared from 1948 to 1958 in a number of revues. By the 1950s the Tivoli circuit was famous for its scantily-clad chorus girls, who were colloquially known as "Tivoli tappers". In 1956 the Tivoli in Melbourne was refurbished in a padded streamlined style,

During the 1950s and early 1960s there were also various pantomime matinees in the summer holidays, featuring puppets, acrobats and comic performers such as John Bluthal, Johnny Lockwood, Barbara Angell and Max Reddy (often as the Dame).

Regular television broadcasting in Melbourne began with the opening night of Channel 7 in July 1956, which included a 45-minute variety program relayed from the Tivoli stage, featuring Barry Humphries.

== Closure ==
The impact of television soon saw numbers at cinemas and theatres begin to dwindle. The Tivoli circuit was hit especially hard, since many of its most popular variety performance acts, singers and comedians, such as Syd Heylen, Joff Ellen, Happy Hammond and Buster Fiddess, had abandoned live theatre to concentrate on the new medium.

In March 1966, the Jimmy Edwards touring show brought the era of live variety to an end. The Tivoli Theatre Melbourne closed on the evening of 2 April 1966, with the proceedings telecast nationally.

"I don't relish the distinction of being the man who closed the Tiv. Music hall's dead in Britain. Now this one's dead, there's nowhere to go. I'll either become a character comedian or a pauper." — Jimmy Edwards final curtain-closing speech, 2 April 1966

The theatre survived as a cinema for another few months, before being gutted by fire around midnight on the 4th / 5th of April 1967. The theatre was demolished to make way for new offices, shops, and the Tivoli Arcade. This arcade bearing the theatre’s name hosted hippie and counterculture stalls for a time in the late 1960s.

== Legacy ==
The legacy of the Tivoli continues through a generation of performers who 'cut their teeth' on the Tivoli stage; and through Melbourne's theatre restaurants which were born from the Tivoli tradition. Tivoli-style performances continued for a time at the Lido nightclub, and at Tikki and John's.

== See also ==
- Architecture of Melbourne
