= Kubelík =

Kubelík, female Kubelíková is a Czech surname. Notable people with the surname include:

- Jan Kubelík (1880–1940), Czech violinist and composer
- Rafael Kubelík (1914–1996), Czech-born Swiss conductor and composer
