= Total House =

- Location within Victoria Location within Australia
- 37.8120°S 144.9682°E
- Location: 170-190 Russell Street, Melbourne, Australia

History
- Design period: 1960s
- Built: 1964-65
- Built for: Savoy Car Park Company

Site notes
- Architect(s): Bogle & Banfield Associates
- Architectural style: Brutalist

Victorian Heritage Register
- Official name: Total House
- Designated: 29 May 2014
- Reference no.: H2329

Total House is a heritage-listed brutalist commercial building at 170-190 Russell Street, Melbourne, Australia. It hosts a live music venue called 170 Russell, as well as retail premises at street level, a seven-level car park, and four storeys of offices atop the car park. It was listed on the Victorian Heritage Register on 29 May 2014 on the basis that it was "a landmark of post-World War II modernist design and...one of the earliest and best expressions of Brutalist architecture in Victoria".

== Development ==
Total House was designed c. 1963 by Bogle & Banfield Associates, a partnership of architects Alan Bogle and Gordon Banfield, for the Savoy Car Park Company, a company controlled by Banfield, which had been established to develop the site, and built in 1964-65. The building's name stems from the original anchor tenant, Total Oil Products P/L (Australia), a subsidiary of French oil company CFP, whose offices were based in the building from 1966 until the 1970s. In 1991, it sold for $21 million, reputedly the largest Melbourne CBD property sale that year, with KPMG among the building's office tenants at that time.

== Demolition bid and heritage listing ==
Total House was at risk of demolition in 2014 after developer AXF Group purchased the site and sought approval to replace it with a 70-storey hotel tower. However, the building's successful heritage listing, following its nomination by heritage group Melbourne Heritage Action, saw the withdrawal of the proposal. The demolition threat sparked public debate about whether 1960s Brutalist architecture should receive heritage protection, amidst threats to a number of prominent Melbourne buildings of that era.

== 170 Russell ==
The basement hosts a nightclub and live music venue called 170 Russell. Before this, it has hosted a succession of entertainment venues over the decades. It was first envisaged as a cinema with the capacity to stage live theatre, with the possibility of being turned into a nightclub if liquor legislation changed.

From 1965, it housed the Lido Cabaret, described as "the first of its kind in Victoria", "providing dinner and a ‘Paris-type’ show, complete with feathers, high kicks and scanty costumes".

After a period as a Spanish-themed nightclub, from the mid-1970s the basement housed the 600-seat Total Theatre, featuring theatre productions including the Australian premiere of Guys & Dolls and the controversial revue Let My People Come. The theatre was operated by Banfield, who used the car park to subsidise the theatre.

Since 1980, the basement has housed a nightclub and live music venue. It was initially known as Billboard until 2014, and was then rebranded as 170 Russell, the building's street address.
