= Maja Jantar =

Polysonic voice artist based in Belgium

Maja Jantar is a multilingual and polytonic voice artist living in Ghent, Belgium, whose work spans the fields of performance, music theatre, poetry and visual arts. A co-founder of the group Krikri, she has been giving individual and collaborative performances throughout Europe and experimenting with poetic sound works since 1995.

Jantar often collaborates with the theatre company Crew, a group operating on the border between art and science, performance and new technology, as well as with actor and director Ewout d'Hoore. She regularly performs with Belgian poet Vincent Tholomé, with whom she has also given workshops on the use of language and sound. Recently, she performed with Vincent Tholomé and Sebastien Dicenaire at the Centre Pompidou in Paris for the Bruits de Bouche Festival.

From 2001 to present, Jantar has directed ten operas, including Monteverdi's classic Incoronatione di Poppea and Sciarrino's contemporary Infinito Nero. Some of her visual poetry has appeared in various publications, amongst others Zieteratuur (The Netherlands), and her visual work has been shown in several exhibits, recently an ink-and-paper selection from her "Lilith" series could be seen at Kunsttempel Kassel (Germany). In the near future she will continue collaborating extensively with Canadian poet and interdisciplinarian a.rawlings and she will soon be publishing a CD and art book of her visual and audio work with Hybriden Verlag in Berlin.
