= Flinders Street, Melbourne =

Street in Melbourne, Victoria

Coordinates: 37.8186°S 144.9637°E

Flinders Street Victoria
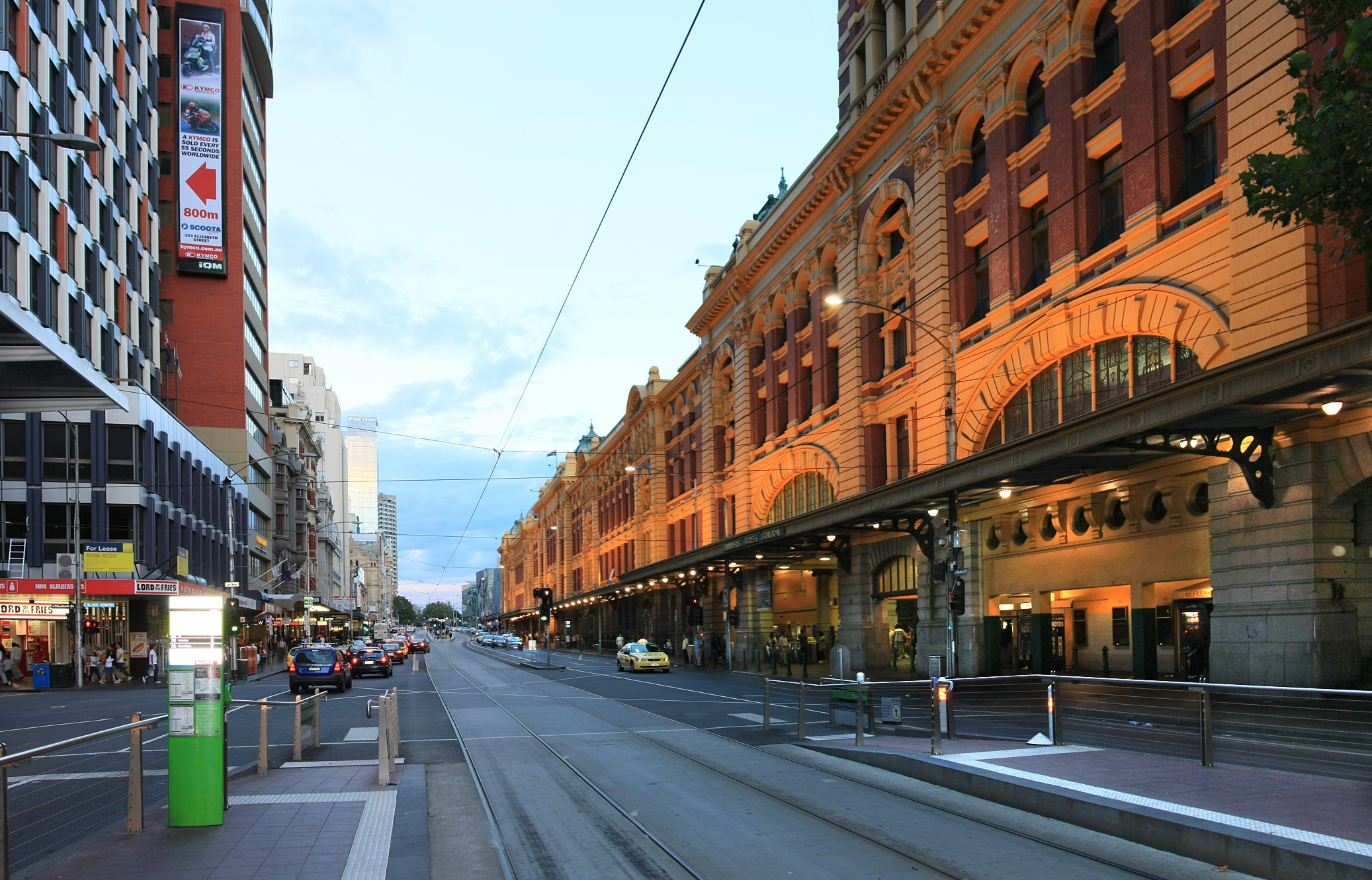
- Flinders Street, facing east from the intersection of Elizabeth Street

General information
- Type: Street
- Length: 2 km (1.2 mi)
- Route number(s): Metro Route 30 (1965–present)
- Tourist routes: Tourist Route 2 (1989–present) (through Docklands)

Major junctions
- West end: Wurundjeri Way; Docklands, Melbourne
- Spencer Street; King Street; Kings Way; William Street; Queen Street; Elizabeth Street; Swanston Street; Russell Street; Exhibition Street; Batman Avenue (toll road); Spring Street
- East end: Wellington Parade; East Melbourne

Location(s)
- LGA(s): City of Melbourne
- Suburb(s): Melbourne

Flinders Street is a street in Melbourne, Victoria, Australia. Running roughly parallel to the Yarra River, Flinders Street forms the southern edge of the Hoddle Grid. It is exactly 1 mi (1.6 km) in length and one and a half chains (99 ft; 30 m) in width.

The street is named after the English explorer, Matthew Flinders, who was erroneously credited with discovering Port Phillip at the time of its naming. It extends eastwards as far as Spring Street and the Treasury Gardens and, originally, terminated at Spencer Street. A continuation westward from Spencer Street called Flinders Street Extension, cut through Batman's Hill to the Melbourne Docklands, was opened in 1890. This short length is now also known as Flinders Street, with continuous numbering.

As the closest street to the river, Flinders Street served Melbourne's original river port near Market Street. The Customs House, now the site of Victoria's Immigration Museum, is on Flinders Street.

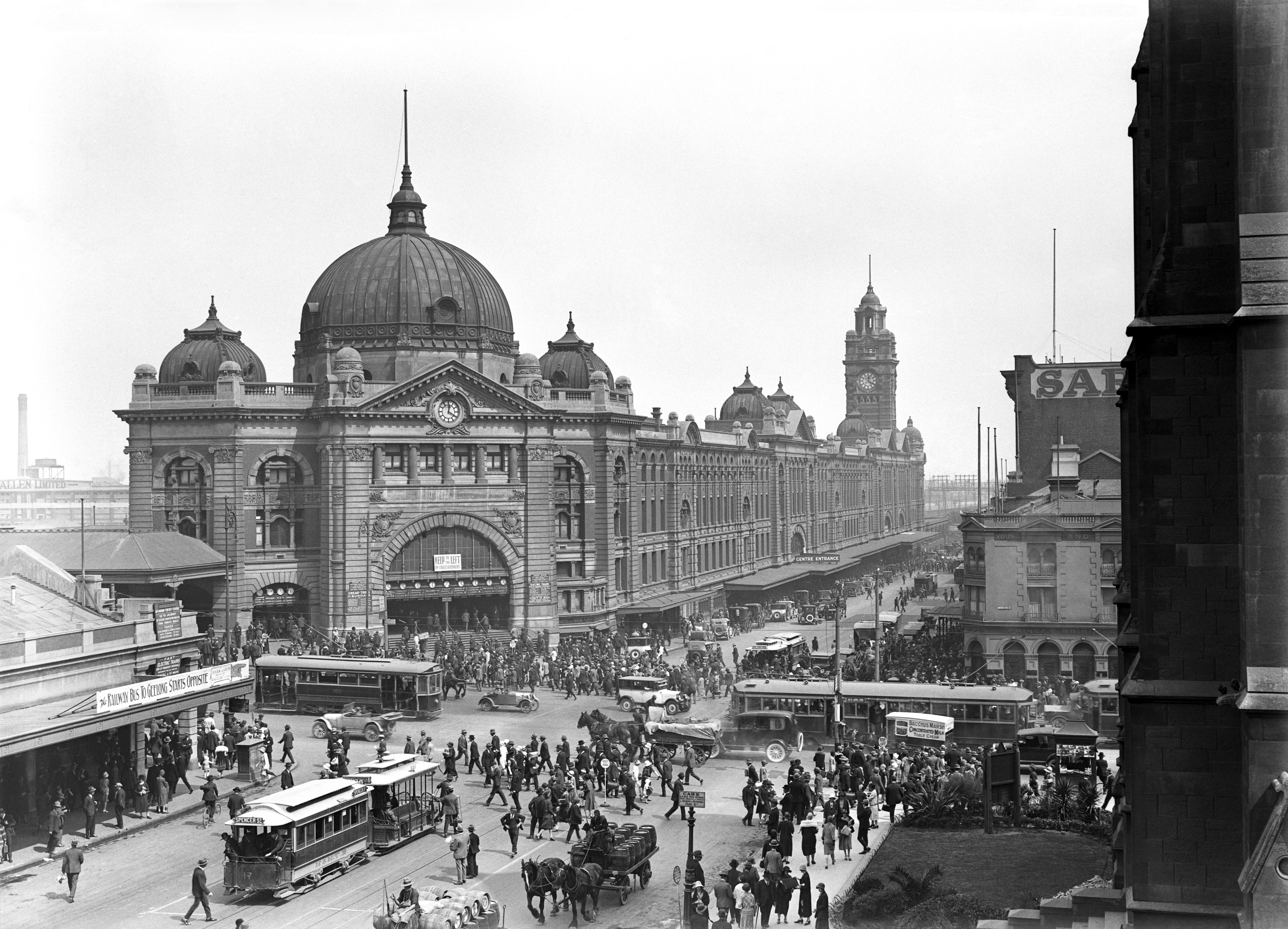
Flinders Street station, located at the intersection of Flinders Street and Swanston Streets, 1927.

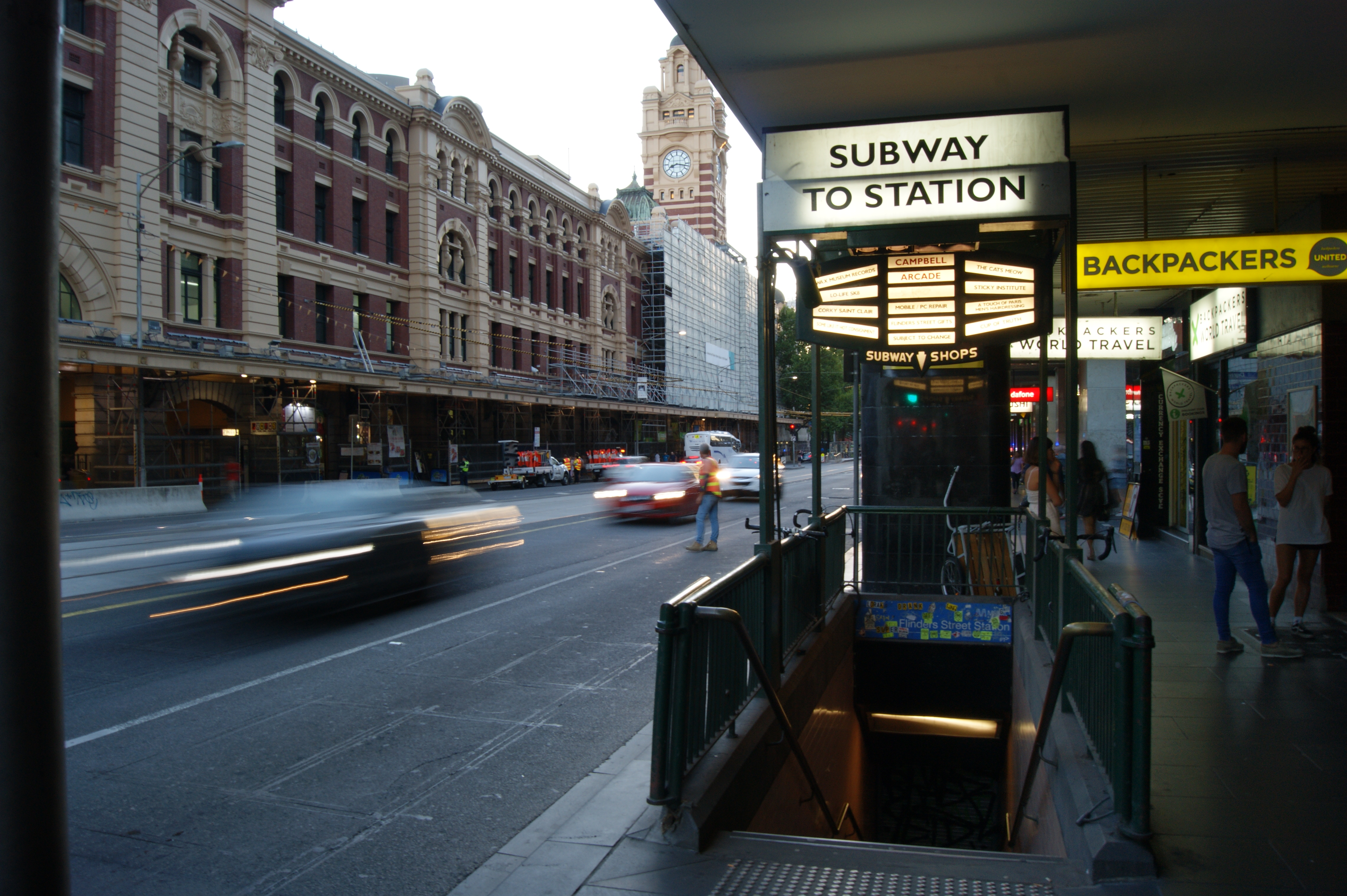
Stairs to the Degraves Street Subway underpass entrance to the station, viewed from the north side of Flinders Street

The street is home to Flinders Street station, the central station in Melbourne's suburban rail network. Tram routes 70 and 75, as well as the City Circle route, run along Flinders Street, and the Flinders Street Viaduct runs roughly parallel to the street, linking the city's two major railway stations.

Other landmarks along Flinders Street include Federation Square, St Paul's Cathedral, Young and Jackson Hotel, the Banana Alley Vaults, the old Herald & Weekly Times building, Melbourne Aquarium and Batman Park, which adjoins the Yarra River.

The land between the south side of Flinders Street and the railway viaduct between Spencer and King Streets was once home to the Melbourne City Markets (generally known as the Fish Market, which was actually located in a separate section on the riverbank), a huge ornate building constructed in 1890. The market buildings were demolished between 1958 and 1960, after which the pa on Flinders Street became a carpark, now the Northbank Place offices, apartments and shops built in 2009. The first Fish Market was also on Flinders Street, built on the site of the corner entrance to Flinders Street Station in 1865.

== King Street Overpass ==
In the late 1950s, an overpass was built to take Flinders Street over its intersection with King Street, as part of the construction of the King Street Bridge and Kings Way. The overpass extended from Downie Street to just east of Custom House Lane.

Excavation commenced on the foundations of the southern side of the overpass on 6 January 1959 and, by 7 September, the first steel girders were erected. Upon completion of the first stage on 21 November 1959, trams were diverted onto temporary tracks laid by the Melbourne & Metropolitan Tramways Board on that part of the structure. On 23 November 1959, construction on the foundations on the northern side of the overpass commenced and, by 20 February 1960, the remainder of the steelwork on that portion was erected. Following the erection of beams and the concreting of decks and permanent tram tracks, trams were diverted from the temporary tracks during the weekend of 11–13 June 1960. The northern traffic lanes heading eastbound were opened to traffic on 1 July 1960, with southbound lanes open not long afterwards.

Many businesses and properties were overshadowed by the overpass which resulted in property values dropping and the closure of hotels, shops and showrooms. Plans to revitalise the area in the early 1960s never eventuated. In May 2002, the state government announced it would be demolished, but it was May 2005 before work commenced, with preparations for Melbourne's 2006 Commonwealth Games acting as a catalyst. The project concluded in August.

== 2017 car attack ==
On 21 December 2017, a driver ploughed through a crowd on Flinders Street, injuring 19 pedestrians. The perpetrator, Saeed Noori, appeared in court on 23 December, charged with 18 counts of attempted murder and one count of reckless conduct endangering life. According to the Melbourne Police, Noori, a 32-year-old Australian of Afghan descent, had a history of assault, drug use and mental health issues. He was remanded in custody and ordered to undergo a psychiatric assessment.

== See also ==
- Wailing Wall (Melbourne)
