= Esling =

Esling may refer to:

- Catharine H. Esling (1812–1897), American writer
- Frederick Esling (1860-1955), Australian railway engineer and chess master
- John Esling (born 1949), Canadian linguist
- William Esling (1868–1946), Conservative and National Government party member of the House of Commons of Canada
