= Flinders Street Viaduct =

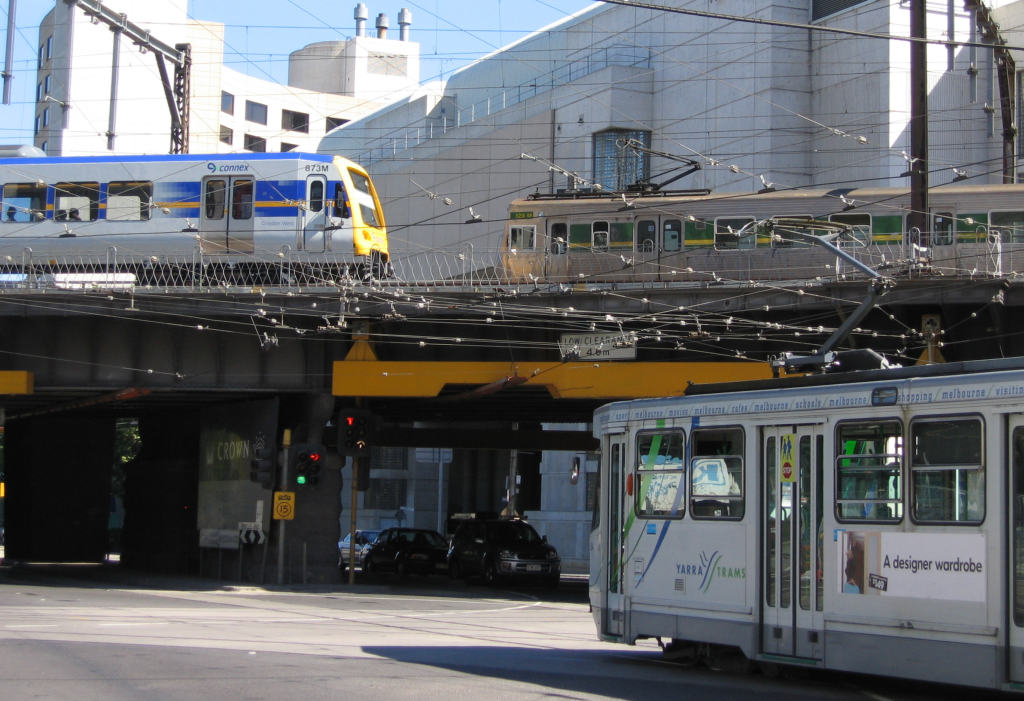
- Trains on the viaduct on the corner of Flinders and Spencer Streets
- Coordinates: 37°49′13″S 144°57′30″E
- Carries: Victorian rail network
- Crosses: From east to west: Queens Bridge Street; William Street; King Street; Spencer Street; Flinders Street
- Locale: Melbourne, Victoria, Australia
- Owner: VicTrack

Rail characteristics
- No. of tracks: 6
- Track gauge: 1,600 mm (5 ft 3 in) broad gauge
- Electrified: 1,500 V DC overhead

History
- Designer: Frederick Esling
- Construction end: November 1891

Location
- Interactive map of Flinders Street Viaduct

The Flinders Street Viaduct is a railway bridge in Melbourne, Australia. Made up of six tracks built at different times, it links Flinders Street station to Southern Cross station, forming the main connection between the eastern and western parts of the Victorian rail network.

The viaduct takes a curving path, passing behind the former Victorian Railways headquarters at 67 Spencer Street, taking a relatively sharp 90 degree turn east from Spencer Street, swinging southward around the back of the former Melbourne City Markets (Note: Often erroneously identified as the Fish Market) (now Northbank Place), with the former Fish Market on its south side (now the west end of Batman Park), then north-east to avoid the former turning basin for ships on the Yarra River, before passing over the Banana Alley Vaults, and entering Flinders Street station.

== Background ==
The first railway in Melbourne was opened in 1854, running from what is now Flinders Street station to Sandridge (now Port Melbourne). New railway lines were built from then on, many of which used Flinders Street station and the adjacent Princes Bridge station as their city terminals. At the same time, a number of country railway lines had been built to the north and west of Melbourne, using Spencer Street station (now Southern Cross) as their terminus.

Many Melbourne residents saw the Spencer Street terminal as undesirable and inconvenient, because it was relatively far from the city centre. As early as 1861, a deputation of residents called on the Railway Commissioner to improve the situation. It was not until 1879 that the Melbourne Railway Station Junctions Act was passed, which authorised a ground level connection between Flinders Street and Spencer Street stations. Three quarters of a mile long, it was classified as a tramway and had limits on operational speeds, noise, and motive power. In addition, it could only be used at night, and had a level crossing at Queensbridge Street.

== History ==
The Railway Construction Act 1884 (the so-called Octopus Act) authorised construction of a permanent link, along with 64 other railway lines around the state. A single track on the viaduct was opened in November 1891, and the whole double line opened for goods traffic the next month, but teething problems limited the viaduct to a single line during February 1892. The viaduct was designed by railway engineer Frederick Esling. He was also the author of a technical paper which identified a puzzling problem related to the horizontal forces on the viaduct due to braking, in combination with side forces from wind-pressure.

The ground-level tramway was removed, although a short section was retained as a siding to serve the new Melbourne City Markets on Flinders Street, not being lifted until 1929.

From December 1894, suburban traffic on the Williamstown and Essendon line began to use the viaduct, after the construction of additional platforms at Spencer Street station. To provide for the growing volume of traffic, the viaduct was duplicated in 1915 to provide four tracks. The extra tracks were built to the immediate south of the existing viaduct, which was then closed and strengthened, before being reopened in 1917.

Until the 1970s, the viaduct remained virtually unchanged. As part of the City Loop project, each of the existing four tracks were integrated into the four independent tunnels around the Melbourne central business district. Two additional tracks were built to the south, but not parallel with the older lines. Instead of steel spans supported by brick pillars, the new viaduct was constructed with precast concrete box girders 722 metres (2,369 ft) long, on concrete supports, each girder carrying a single rail track, with each span 30 to 35 metres (98 to 115 ft) long. Unlike the earlier viaduct tracks, the new ones were able to take a straighter path because the turning basin had long been disused and partly filled in. Work began in December 1975, and the new viaduct was opened on 11 December 1978. Work then began on rehabilitating and upgrading the older viaduct, with two tracks being taken out of use at a time. The new viaduct was signalled to allow trains to travel in one direction only on each line, whereas the four tracks on the older viaduct were re-signalled for bidirectional use, because it was planned that the direction of travel on each Loop track would be reversed between the morning and afternoon peaks.

The land under the viaduct has been put to various uses. For example, when the King Street Bridge was built in 1958, some was turned over to the City of Melbourne, who used it as a car impound yard for parking offences. That ceased in 2003 when the Flinders Street overpass of King Street was demolished. The original viaduct was re-decked in 2000, from near Spencer Street through to near Market Street.

In 1997, the Northbank area was redeveloped, with the turning basin partly restored and the newer viaduct bathed in blue light by night in an artwork titled 'Blue Line' by Peter McNeill-Stitt, that includes 1,400 metres (4,600 ft) of neon tubing. The Melbourne Aquarium was built under and around the newest viaduct between February 1998 and December 1999, and as of 2008 is being expanded under the four track viaduct towards Flinders Street. As part of the Northbank Place development in the late 2000s, three 11-storey mixed-use towers were built on the former Melbourne City Markets site, and resulted in the railway signals needing to be altered due to the altered sight lines for trains coming around the curve. The corresponding area on the south side of the viaduct, including the site of the old Fish Market, has become Batman Park and includes a pathway named "Rebecca Walk" in reference to the Schooner Rebecca.

== Gallery ==
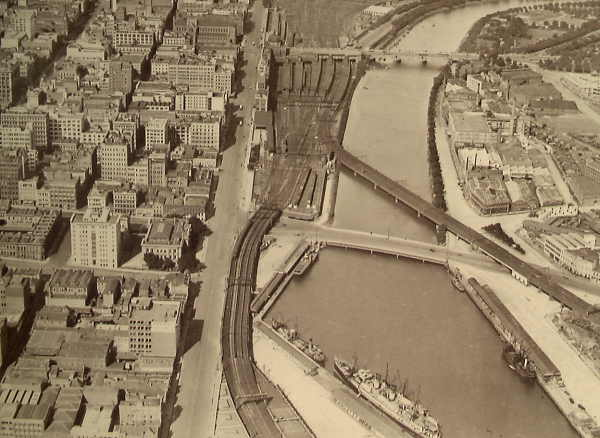
The four track viaduct in 1928, with the Sandridge Bridge crossing the Yarra and the turning basin still in use.

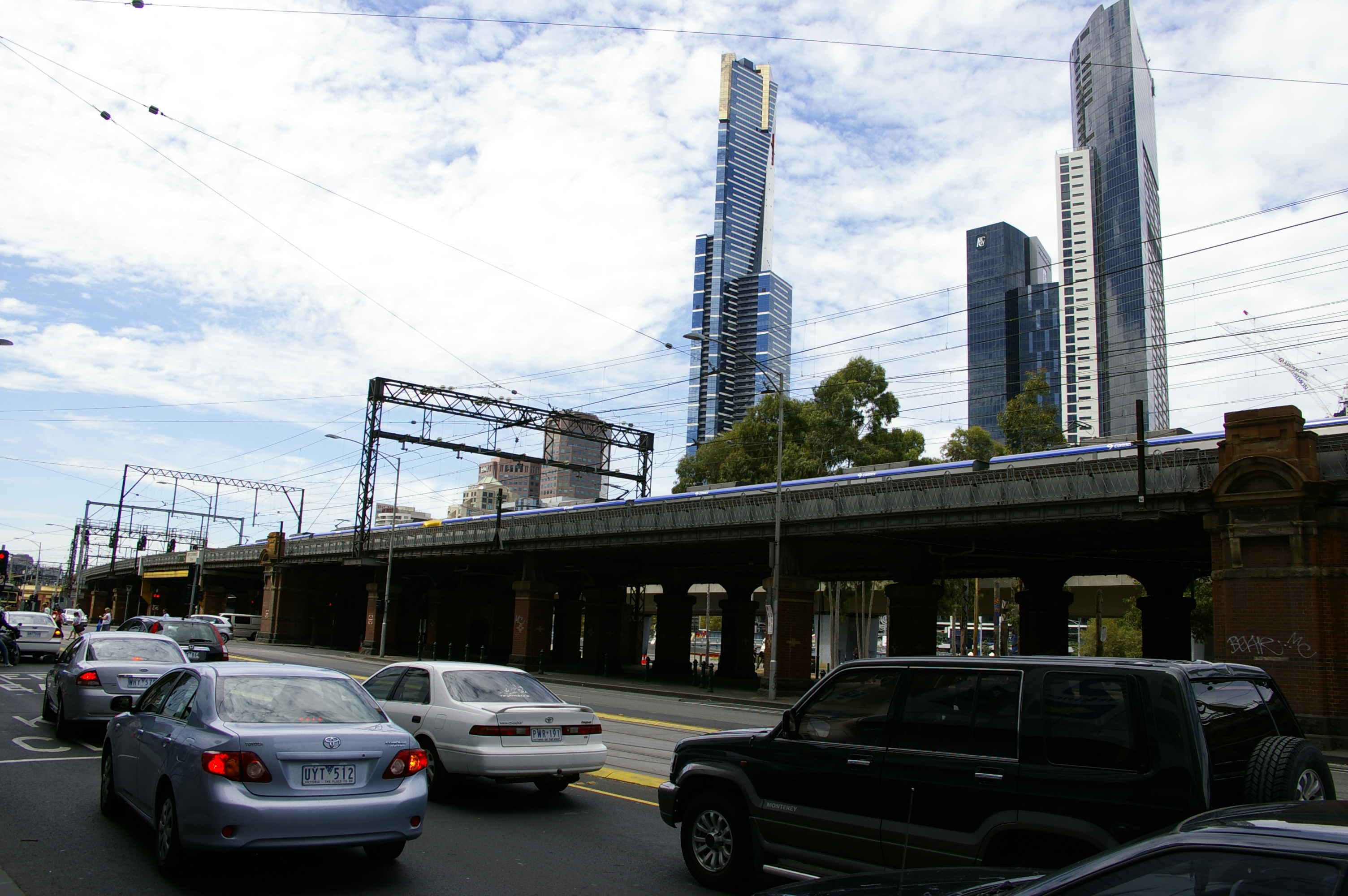
Viewed from Flinders Street itself, looking east.

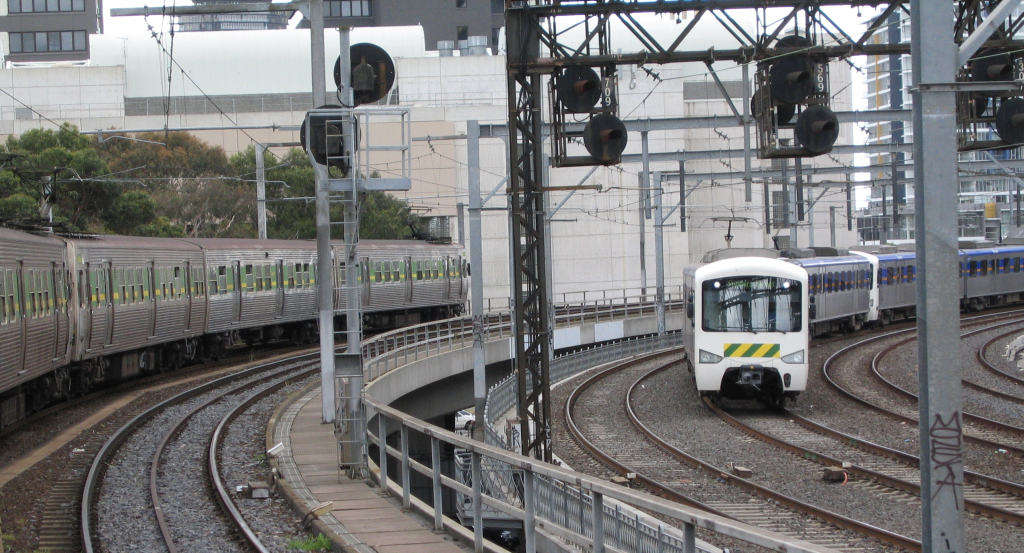
Looking east from a train on the new Viaduct, towards Southern Cross and a train on the old viaduct.

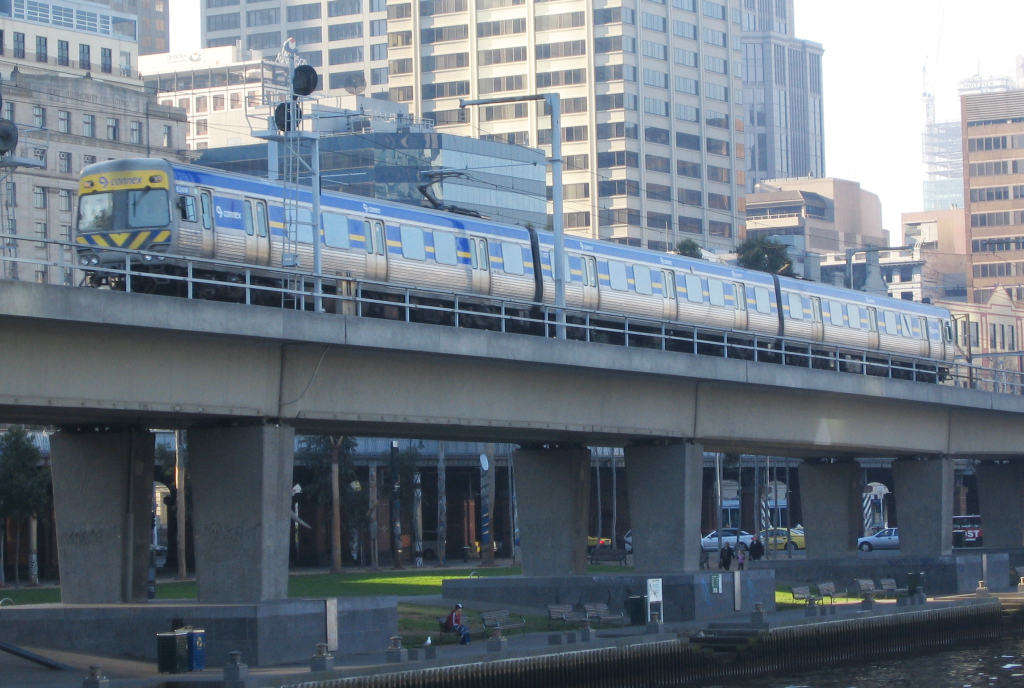
The new Viaduct viewed from the Yarra River.

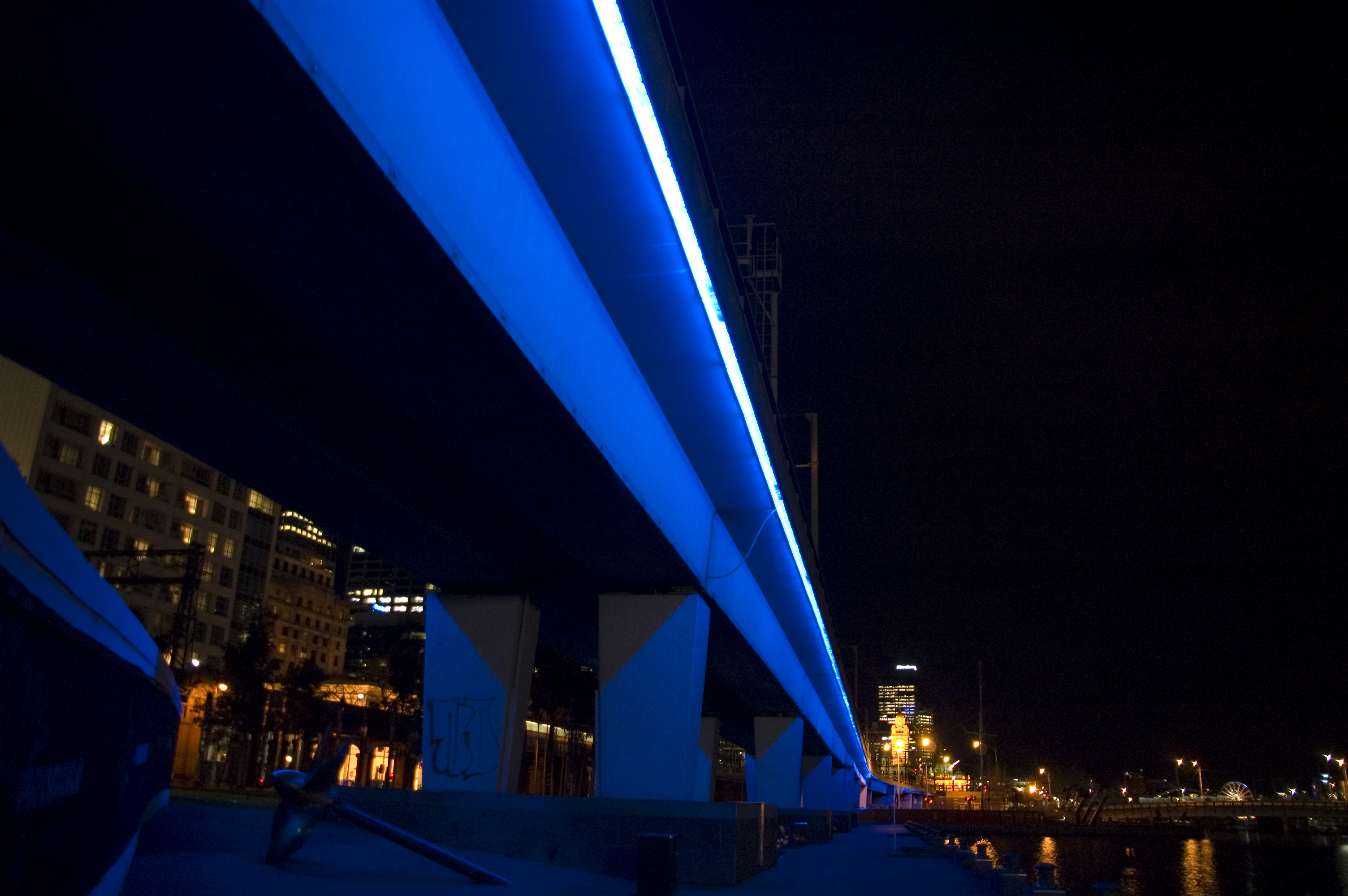
The new viaduct by night.

== See also ==
- Railways in Melbourne
