= City Loop =

Rail tunnel through the Melbourne CBD

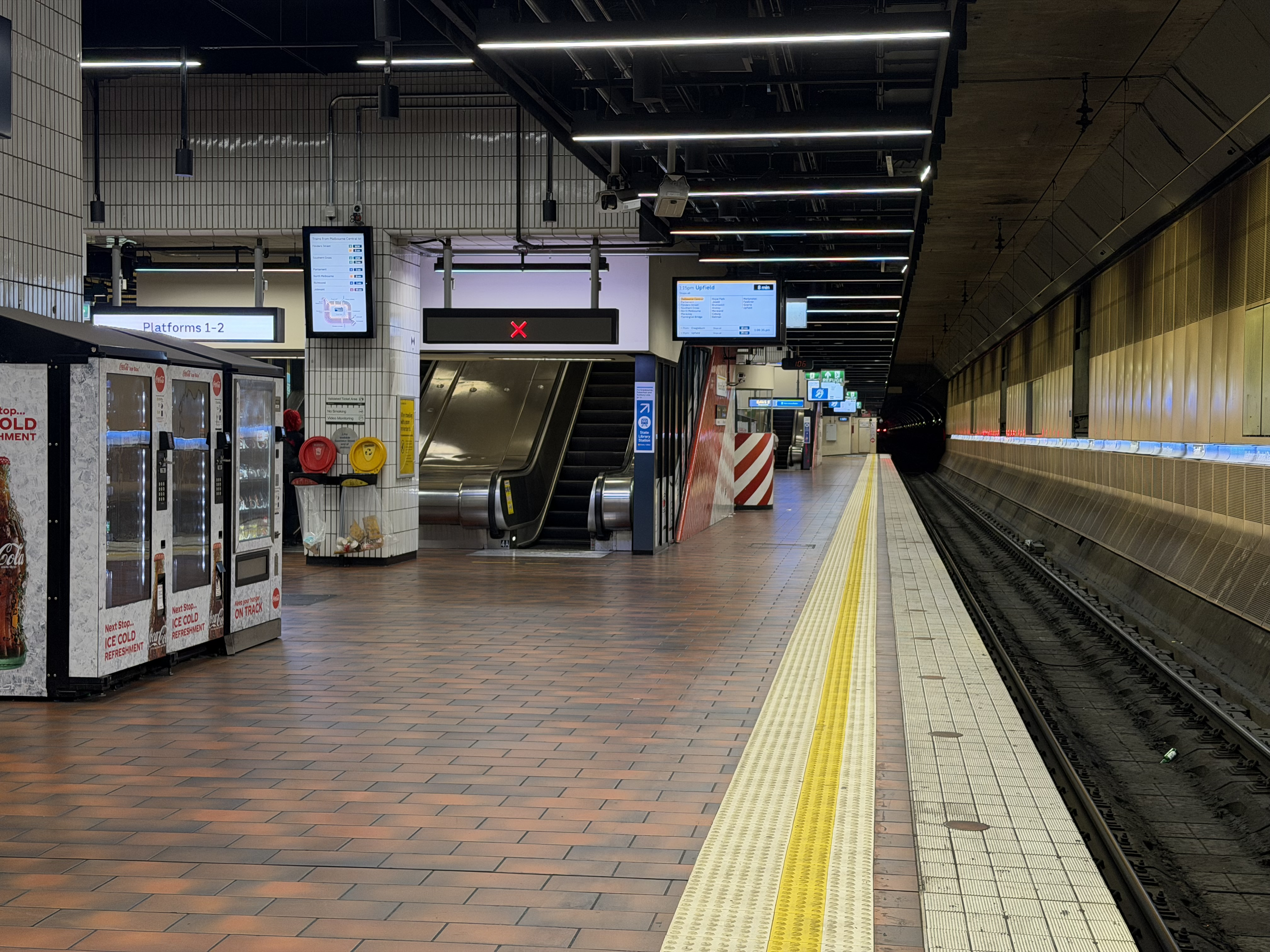
- Platform at Melbourne Central station in the City Loop, February 2026

Overview
- Owner: VicTrack
- Stations: 3

Service
- Services: All suburban lines except Sunbury, Cranbourne, Pakenham, Sandringham, Werribee and Williamstown line trains
- Operator(s): Victorian Railways (1981–1983); Metropolitan Transit Authority (1983–1989); Public Transport Corporation (1989–1997); Bayside Trains (1997–2004); Hillside Trains (1997–2009); Metro Trains Melbourne (2009–present)

History
- Work began: 1971
- Opened: 1981
- Completed: 1985

Technical
- Num of tracks: 2 single bidirectional tunnels Flinders Street – Parliament; 4 single bidirectional tunnels Parliament – Flagstaff; 3 single bidirectional tunnels Flagstaff – Southern Cross
- Character: Underground
- Electrification: 1,500 V DC overhead catenary

The City Loop (originally called the Melbourne Underground Rail Loop or MURL) is a piece of underground metropolitan rail infrastructure in the city centre of Melbourne, Victoria, Australia.

The loop includes four single-track rail tunnels and three underground stations: Flagstaff, Melbourne Central (formerly Museum) and Parliament. The loop connects to Melbourne's two busiest stations, Flinders Street and Southern Cross, and together with the Flinders Street Viaduct forms a ring of four individual tracks around the CBD.

Eleven metropolitan lines of the Melbourne rail network run through the City Loop, organised into four separate groups, the Burnley, Caulfield, Clifton Hill/City Circle, and Northern groups. Each group has its own dedicated single-track tunnel, with trains running on balloon loops around the CBD. The Loop follows La Trobe and Spring Streets along the northern and eastern edges of the CBD's street grid.

Although concepts for an underground railway had been raised since the 1920s, planning was not seriously progressed until the 1960s. The Melbourne Underground Rail Loop Act 1970 finalised the design and established an authority to oversee construction of the project. Tunnelling works began in 1972 and the Loop commenced operation in 1981 with the opening of Museum station, now Melbourne Central. The loop was fully complete in 1985 with the opening of Flagstaff station.

The Metro Tunnel, a new rail tunnel under the CBD built to relieve pressure on the City Loop, began operating following a soft-open on 30 November 2025. From 1 February 2026, the Pakenham, Cranbourne and Sunbury metropolitan lines were fully removed from the Loop to full-time through the Metro Tunnel, while the Frankston line returned to the Caulfield loop tunnel. As a result of this, the Sandringham lines will through-run with the Werribee/Williamstown lines.

== History ==
Before the City Loop was constructed, Flinders Street and Spencer Street (now called Southern Cross) stations were connected only by the four track Flinders Street Viaduct beside the Yarra River. The suburban terminus of Flinders Street had become seriously congested by the 1970s, with a throughput of only ten trains per platform per hour (roughly 1,700 trains a day) — compared to a maximum of 24 if there was through running. Many trains were through routed from the southern and eastern suburbs to the north and west, but the flow was imbalanced and a number of trains were required to reverse their direction. The Epping and Hurstbridge lines stood alone from the rest of the network, having Princes Bridge station for their own exclusive use.

Several plans had been proposed over the preceding decades to alleviate the bottleneck. The one that was adopted was the building of a circular railway allowing trains to continue past Flinders Street, loop around and return to the suburbs. It was expected to boost platform capacity, allowing more trains per platform per hour on the same number of Flinders Street platforms. The loop would also bring train commuters directly into the northern and eastern sections of the CBD, delivering workers closer to their offices, students closer to RMIT University, and government officials directly to the Parliament buildings. Although the city's tram network already covered the CBD extensively, trams are not as efficient as trains when bringing large numbers of commuters into the city.

=== Planning ===
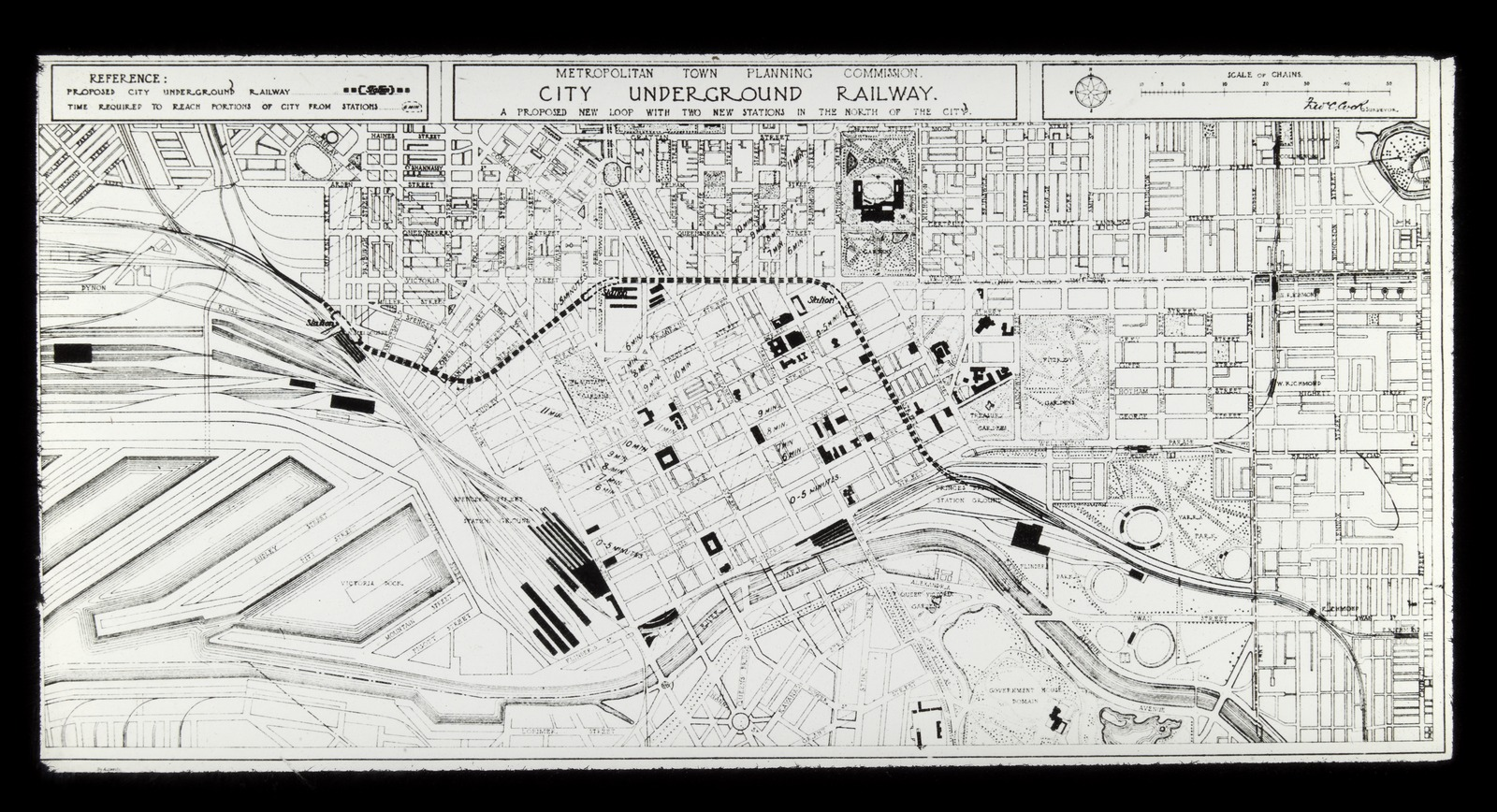
Melbourne Town Planning Commission's 1929 plan for a city rail tunnel, a precursor to the City Loop.

Plans for an underground city railway in Melbourne are almost as old as electrification of the network itself. In 1929, the Metropolitan Town Planning Commission released a report recommending an underground city bypass from Richmond to North Melbourne stations via Exhibition and Victoria streets. The 1940 Victorian Railways Ashworth Improvement Plan recommended a different approach, with additional platforms at the Flinders Street/Princes Bridge station complex to be built over two levels, along with a connection to an underground City Railway. The Victorian Railways promoted another route in 1950 as part of the Operation Phoenix rehabilitation plan, the line running from Richmond towards Jolimont station, under the Fitzroy Gardens and Lonsdale Street then turning north to North Melbourne station. A branch line turned north from William Street, and went through the Flagstaff Gardens. In 1954 the Melbourne and Metropolitan Board of Works released their Planning Scheme for Melbourne report, which included the Richmond – North Melbourne Lonsdale Street route.

A Parliamentary Committee on Public Works reported favourably on a city loop in 1954, and in 1958 a City Underground Railway Committee was appointed by the Transport Minister. It stated bluntly that the aim of the loop was not just to relieve crowding at Flinders Street, but to win back patronage from private cars, and if it did not then the project was a waste of time and resources. The plan included four stations, being cut to the present three by the elimination of one under Latrobe Street.

Melbourne Underground Rail Loop Authority logo used during construction.

The 'City of Melbourne Underground Railway Construction Act' was passed in 1960, and test bores were sunk by the Mines Department in 1961, but no funding was provided. Throughout the next few years many proposals were made for providing more car parking in the city, so in 1963 the Government set up the Metropolitan Transportation Committee to look at both road and rail transport. It released a report in 1965 that included the same rail plan as the 1960 Act.

=== Construction ===
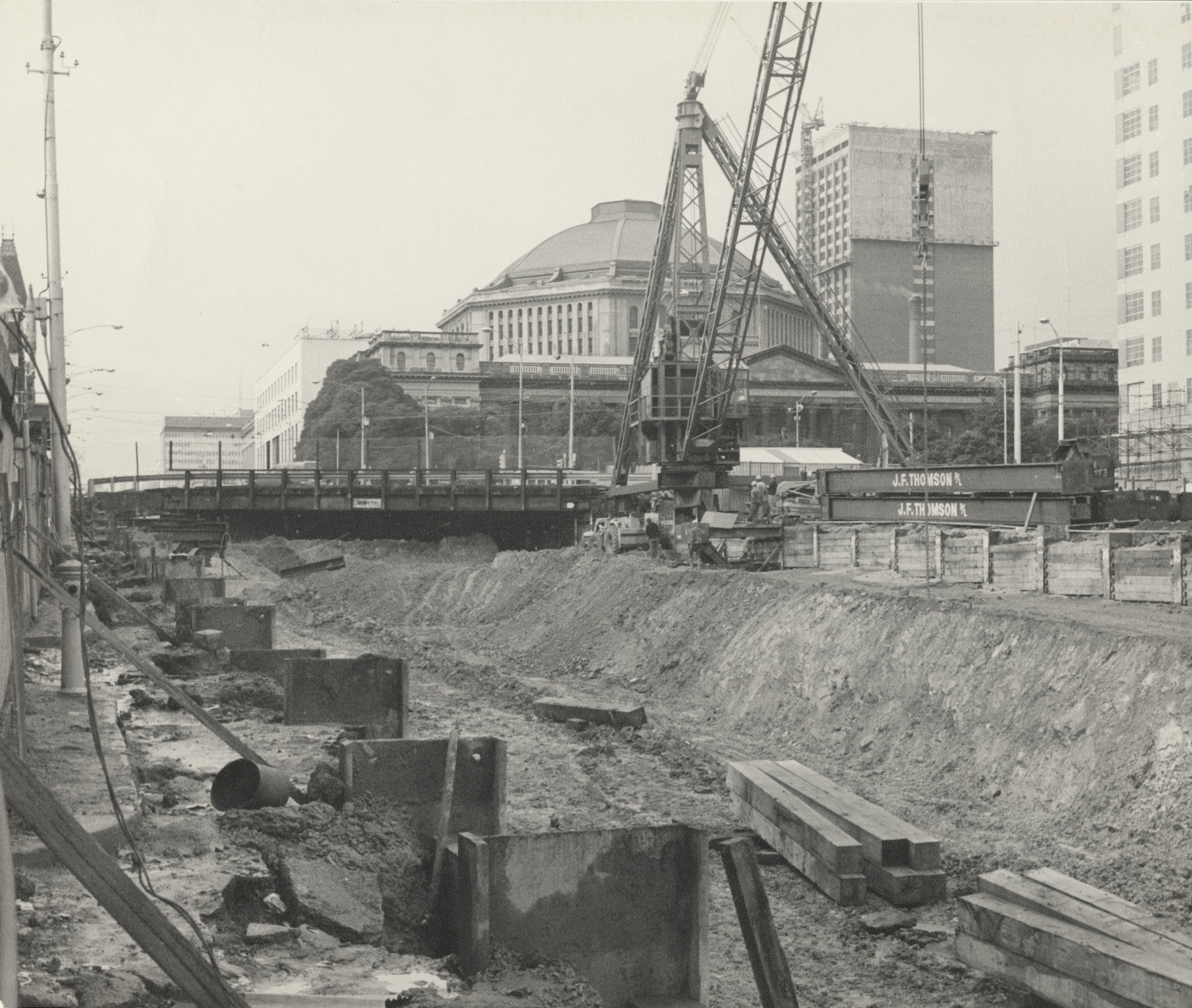
Construction of Museum station in July 1974, showing cut and cover excavation of La Trobe Street, with the State Library of Victoria in the background.

Following the 1969 Melbourne Transportation Plan, the Melbourne Underground Rail Loop Act 1970 (No. 8023) was introduced into parliament by Transport Minister Vernon Wilcox, and the Melbourne Underground Rail Loop Authority (MURLA) was created on 1 January 1971 to oversee the construction and operation of the loop. The City of Melbourne, the Melbourne and Metropolitan Board of Works and the Victorian Railways all made annual contributions to support the operating costs of the authority. An unsuccessful request for funding was made to the Federal Government.

The project was financed using debentures, with the State Government paying 60% of the cost and a special city levy from 1963 funding the remainder. The levy was supposed to be in place for forty years (until 2003), but was ended in 1995. A consortium of four engineering companies was established to construct the project: one from Australia, one from the United Kingdom, one from Canada and one from the United States of America. On 22 June 1971, the first sod of the project was turned by Wilcox in the middle of the Jolimont rail yards.

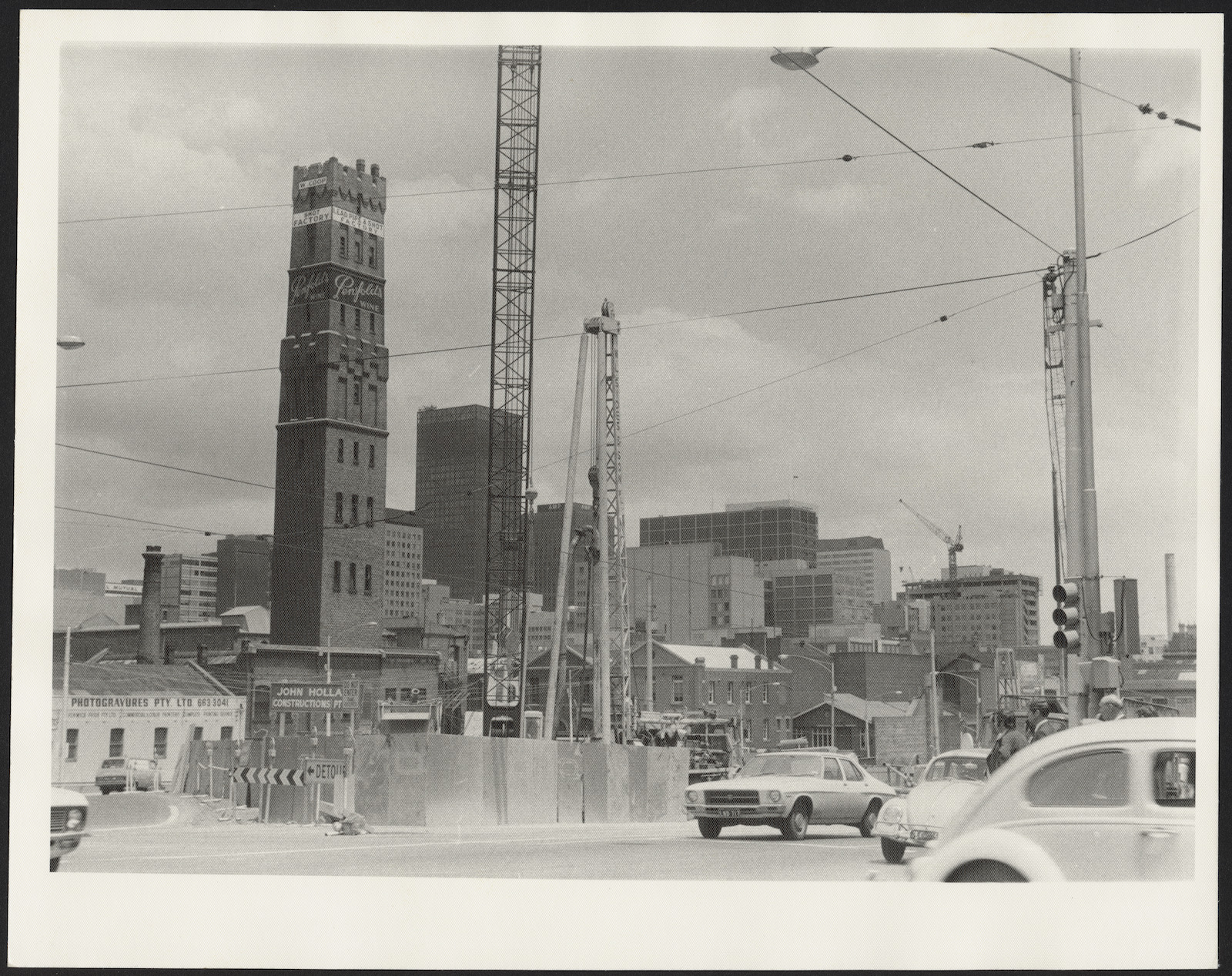
Construction of Museum station in July 1974 looking towards Coop's Shot Tower.

Tunnelling works under the city streets commenced in June 1972, using a tunnel boring machine built by Richmond engineering firm Jaques Limited. as well as conventional boring methods. At North Melbourne, Spencer Street and Jolimont Yard, cut and cover tunnelling was used to build the access ramps, with the above ground running lines being slewed from time to time as work proceeded. The first completed tunnel was the Burnley Loop, with the final breakthrough made on 8 June 1977 near the Museum station site.

The loop comprises four single-track tunnels on two levels, and includes +four pre-existing elevated tracks between Flinders Street and Spencer Street stations. A new double track concrete viaduct was erected beside the existing quadruple track Flinders Street Viaduct in order to replace capacity for non-loop trains. Construction began in 1975 and was completed in 1978. Of the three new stations, Museum was built using the cut and cover method in a 26-metre-deep (85 ft 4 in) box, while Flagstaff and Parliament were excavated using mining methods. During the excavation of Museum station, La Trobe Street and its tram tracks were temporarily relocated to the south onto the site of what is now the Melbourne Central Shopping Centre from December 1973, and were moved back in 1978.

The total length of tunnels in the loop is 12 km (7.5 mi) with 10 km (6.2 mi) of circular tunnels, and 2 km (1.2 mi) of box tunnels. The four tunnels have an average length of 3.74 km (2.32 mi), with a further 1 kilometre (0.62 mi) of track connecting with surface tracks. Some 900,000 m^{3} (1,177,156 yd^{3}) of earth was removed and 300,000 m^{3} (392,385 yd^{3}) of concrete poured to form the stations and line the tunnel walls.

A "double sleeper" floating track system was used to solve the problem of ground-transmitted vibration and track noise, and the loop has some of the best-designed and quietest underground stations in the world. At the time of its construction, Parliament station had the Southern Hemisphere's longest escalators.

Traction power was turned on in October 1980, and the first test train ran on 4 December 1980. In 1965, the cost of the project had been estimated at between £30 and £35 million but, by 1975, inflation had resulted in it rising to $255,600,000. While the final cost was $500 million, the opening of the loop helped reverse a 30-year trend of falling suburban rail patronage.

=== Opening ===
Queen Elizabeth II toured Museum station during her visit to Australia in May 1980, and opened the plaza on top of the Swanston Street entrance, which was named Queen Elizabeth Plaza. Two short documentary films, Loop and Action Loop, were commissioned by the MURLA to advertise the new railway to Melburnians, as well as abroad. A third film was planned, but never shot.

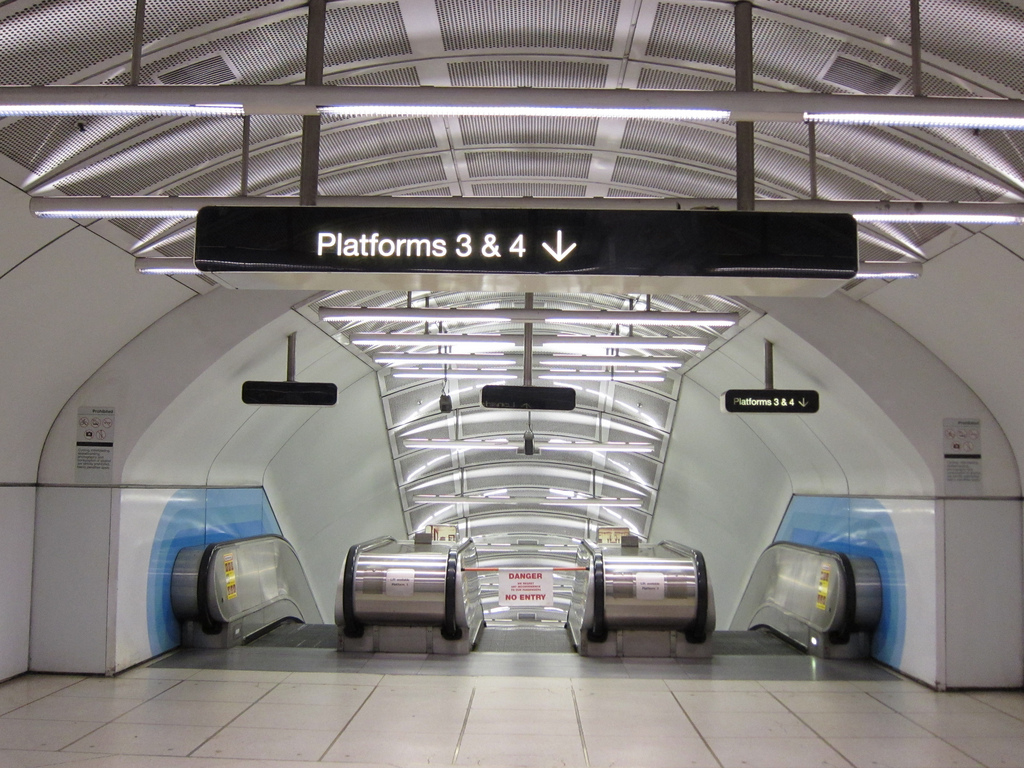
When it opened in 1985, Parliament station had the longest escalators in Australia.

The loop was opened gradually between 1981 and 1985. Museum station and the Burnley and Caulfield tunnels opened first, on 24 January 1981. The City Circle tunnel opened with special services on 6 December 1981, and Clifton Hill services started using the loop on 31 October 1982. Parliament station opened on 22 January 1983, the Northern tunnel on 7 January 1985 (14 January 1985 with limited services) and Flagstaff station on 27 May 1985.

=== Recent ===
In 2021, seven-car High Capacity Metro Trains were introduced to the City Loop on the Caulfield tunnel. As part of that, signalling infrastructure was altered and operations of the Caulfield loop were changed to run consistently anti-clockwise around the loop all-day, every day.

In January 2023, the City Loop and its three stations were closed for two weeks to allow for major safety upgrades to the stations and tunnels. The works will upgrade smoke detection systems, extraction systems, fire detection, fire hydrants, CCTV, and intruder-detection systems. The upgrade was originally started under the Napthine Liberal government in 2014 and was significantly delayed after the collapse of the contractor while works were underway. The cost ballooned from an estimated $43 million in 2014 to $469 million in 2023.

=== Metro Tunnel ===
A map of the Metro Tunnel, with two CBD interchange stations with the City Loop.

Construction began in 2017 on the Metro Tunnel, a new heavy rail tunnel through the Melbourne central business district designed to relieve congestion on the City Loop tunnels. The 9 km (5.6 mi) dual tunnels soft-opened on 30 November 2025 with limited services through the Metro Tunnel running alongside the existing City Loop service timetable, before full opening on 1 February 2026 when Cranbourne, Pakenham and Sunbury line trains commenced running exclusively through the tunnel. The north-south tunnels were first recommended by the Eddington Transport Report in 2008 as a way to increase the central city's rail capacity. The tunnel involved the construction of five new underground stations: Arden, Parkville, State Library, Town Hall and Anzac. There are direct underground pedestrian interchanges with City Loop and other metropolitan services at State Library with Melbourne Central station, and at Town Hall with Flinders Street station.

This Metro Tunnel creates a new cross-city rail corridor, upgrading and connecting the Pakenham and Cranbourne lines in Melbourne's south-east to the Sunbury line in Melbourne's north-west. The removal of these lines from the City Loop will allow for service increases on the Craigieburn and Upfield lines, and for the Frankston line to return to the City Loop with dedicated use of the Caulfield tunnel. Sandringham line trains will run through to Williamstown and Werribee via the Flinders Street Viaduct.

== Layout ==
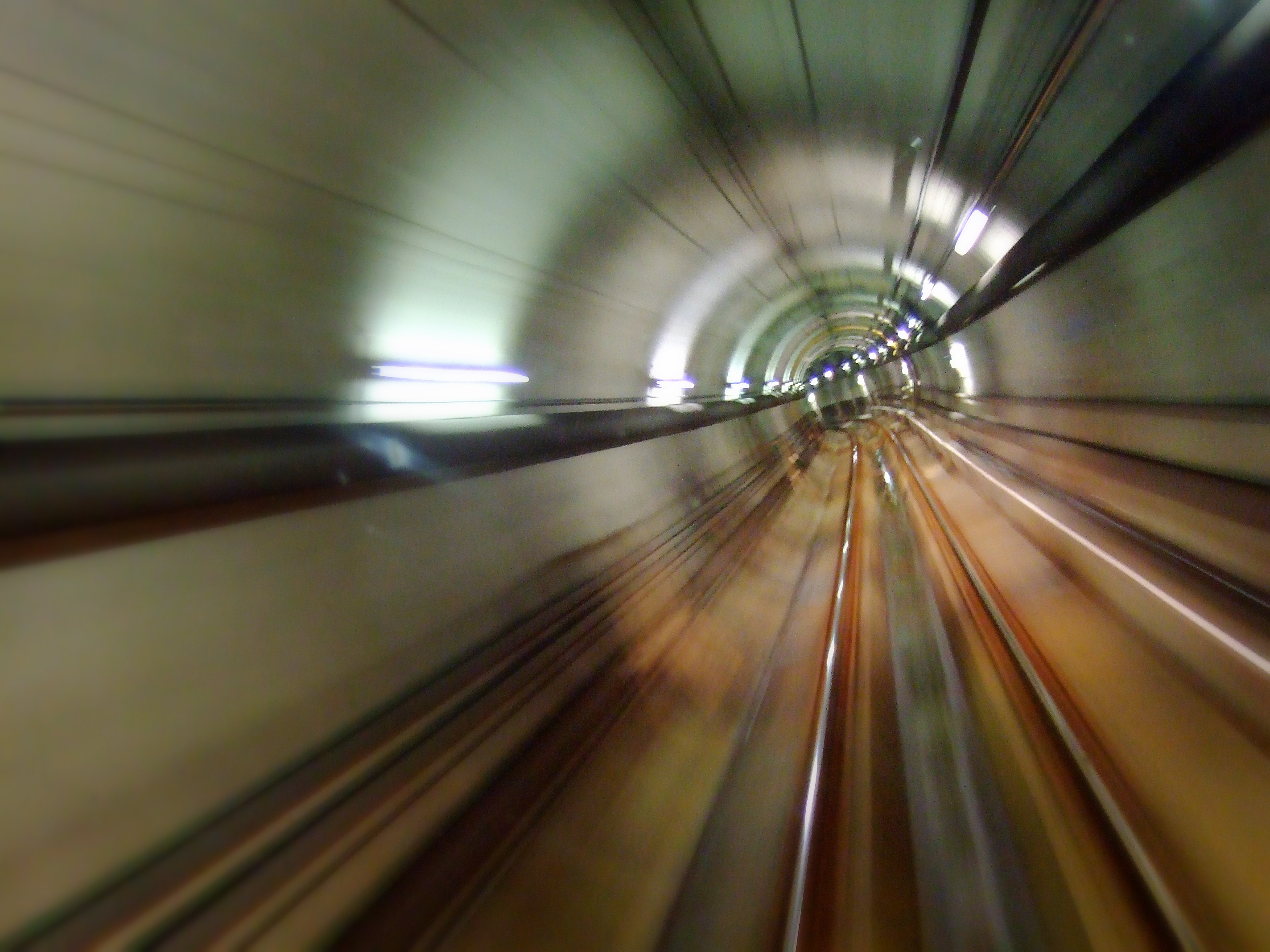
Inside a section of bored tunnel in 2004.

The City Loop consists of four independent single-track tunnels, and services operate as four balloon loops, two of which operate one way during the morning and the other way in the afternoon. The City Loop has four tracks on two levels and all stations have four platforms. The four tunnels have portals on both the eastern and western ends of the city centre. The Burnley and Caulfield tunnels run mostly parallel to each other, beginning at Richmond and ending at Southern Cross. The Clifton Hill tunnel's Western End begins at Southern Cross; the tunnel is the only one that can serve as a full loop, as the tunnel splits into two after Parliament branching off to both Jolimont and Flinders Street.

== Services and direction of travel ==
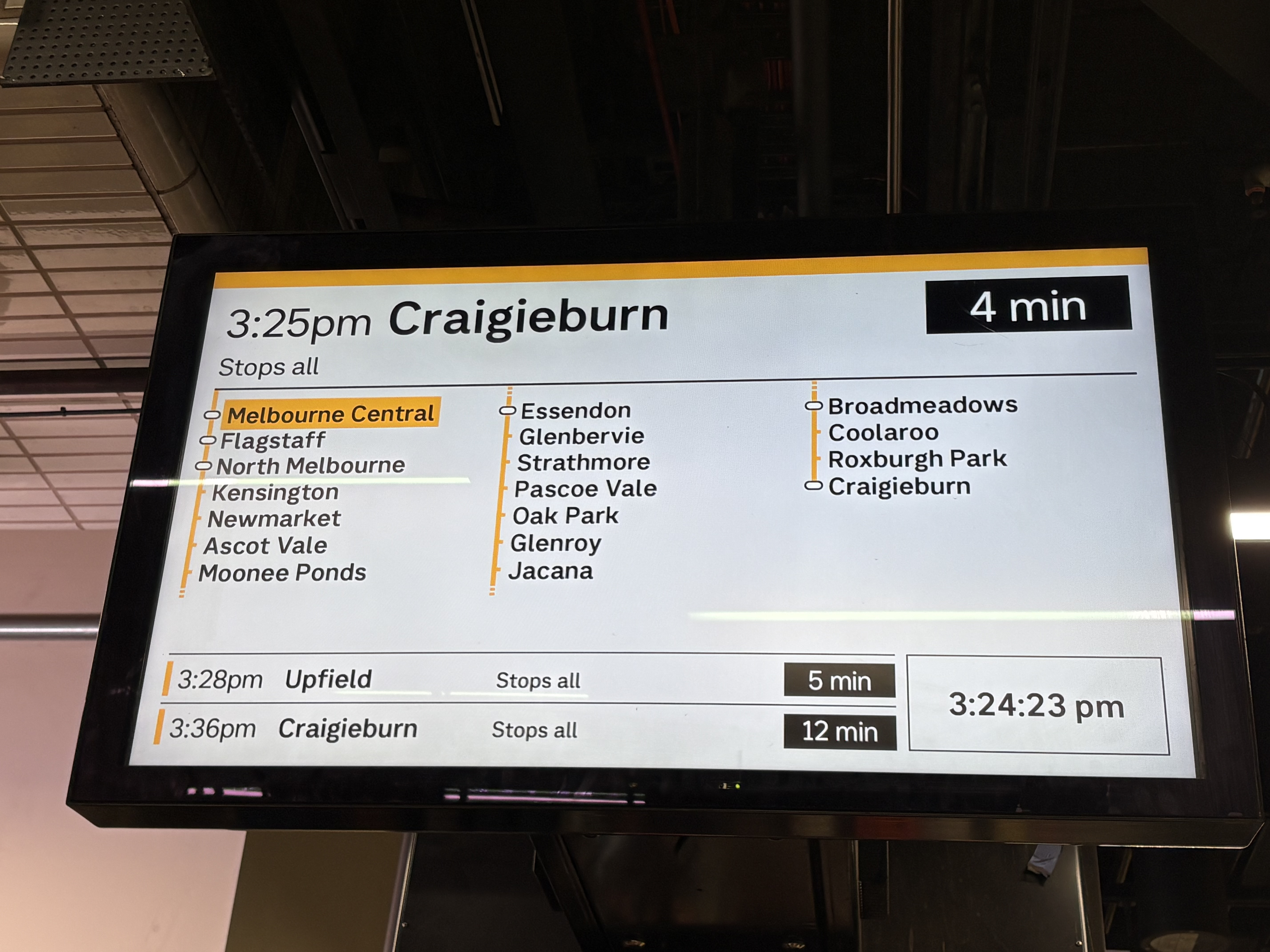
Next train display at Melbourne Central station

All metropolitan lines on the Melbourne rail network except for the Stony Point line serve Flinders Street station or the adjacent Town Hall station, but not all of these lines serve the City Loop.

Depending on direction of travel, city-bound services that use the City Loop either run "via City Loop" (travels around the Loop before arriving at Flinders Street and Southern Cross), or "direct to Flinders Street" (stops at Flinders Street and Southern Cross first, then continues around the Loop to leave the city). At Flinders Street, some trains may also terminate to change services.

Trains on the Werribee and Williamstown lines thorugh run with the Sandringham line, via Flinders Street and Southern Cross, and does not run through the City Loop. Trains on the Pakenham and Cranbourne lines continue towards Sunbury via the Metro Tunnel, which bypasses the City Loop.

The nine remaining metropolitan lines serve the City Loop and are organised into four separate groups: Burnley, Caulfield, Clifton Hill, and Northern. Each group has its own dedicated single track tunnel, and carries several lines. The Alamein, Belgrave, Craigieburn, Frankston, Glen Waverley, Hurstbridge, Lilydale, Mernda, and Upfield lines all run through the loop, although some services run direct to Flinders Street station.

Stopping patterns alternate during weekdays on the Northern and Burnley Groups, with trains switching directions during the day, whereas on the Clifton Hill and Caulfield groups stopping patterns remain consistent all day.

=== Burnley Group ===
- Lilydale , Belgrave , Alamein & Glen Waverley lines

The Burnley Group currently remains as one of the two loops to reverse operations on weekdays.

During the morning, Burnley Group trains from Camberwell runs anti-clockwise through the loop, departing Richmond then running via the City Loop before arriving at Flinders Street. Services departing the city will then run direct to Richmond, and continue out towards the suburbs. The Glen Waverley line runs direct to Flinders Street. Passengers for the City Loop can change at Richmond for a connecting City Loop service.

During the afternoon, most Burnley Group trains run clockwise through the loop, departing Richmond running direct to Flinders Street. Services departing the city will then run via the loop to Richmond and continue out towards the suburbs. Trains running local between Camberwell and the City run direct from Flinders Street.

On public holidays and Weekends, the Burnley Group operates under the same service pattern as weekday afternoons running clockwise from Flinders Street via the loop to Richmond all day.

During Night Network (Saturday 12:30am-5:30am, Sunday 12:30am-7:30am) Services will run direct to and from Flinders Street from Richmond.

=== Caulfield Group ===
- Frankston line

The Caulfield Group currently runs anti-clockwise (departing Richmond running via the City Loop to Flinders Street). This has been the case since timetable changes in 2021.

From 1 February 2026, the Frankston line began exclusive use of the Caulfield tunnels. The Frankston line had formerly used the Caulfield tunnels alongside the Cranbourne and Pakenham lines in regular service until 2011, with limited City Loop services continuing in peak and on weekends until 2021.

During Night Network (Saturday 12:30am-5:30am, Sunday 12:30am-7:30am) Services will run direct to and from Flinders Street from Richmond.

=== Clifton Hill Group ===
- Mernda & Hurstbridge lines

The Clifton Hill Group currently runs clockwise (departing Flinders Street then running via the City Loop to Jolimont). This has been the case since timetable changes in 2013.

During Night Network (Saturday 12:30am-5:30am, Sunday 12:30am-7:30am) Services will run direct to and from Flinders Street from Jolimont.

=== Northern Group ===
- Craigieburn & Upfield lines

The Northern Group currently remains as one of the two loops to reverse operations on weekdays.

During the morning, the Northern Group runs clockwise through the loop, departing North Melbourne, running via the City Loop before arriving at Flinders Street. Services departing the city will then run direct via Southern Cross to North Melbourne and continue out towards the suburbs.

During the afternoon, the Northern Group runs anti-clockwise through the loop, departing North Melbourne then running direct via Southern Cross to Flinders Street. Services departing the city will then run via the City Loop to North Melbourne and continue out towards the suburbs.

On public holidays and Weekends, the Northern Group operates under the same service pattern as weekday mornings running clockwise from North Melbourne via the loop to Flinders Street all day.

The Werribee line formerly used the Northern tunnels in regular service until 2011, with City Loop services continuing on weekends until 2021. (Note that the Williamstown line never historically ran via the City Loop). From 1 February 2026, the Sunbury line also ceased running through the City Loop, instead running via the Metro Tunnel.

During Night Network (Saturday 12:30am-5:30am, Sunday 12:30am-7:30am) Services will run direct to and from Flinders Street from North Melbourne whilst skipping Southern Cross. (On Sunday mornings between 5am and 7:30am all services will stop at Southern Cross but will still run direct to and from Flinders Street).

=== Summary table ===
Direction colour key
via City Loop, then Flinders Street	direct to Flinders Street, then City Loop

Platform number	1	2	3	4
Lines	Clifton Hill Group	Caulfield Group	Northern Group	Burnley Group
Lines	Mernda & Hurstbridge	Frankston	Craigieburn & Upfield	Lilydale , Belgrave , Alamein & Glen Waverley
Weekday mornings	Clockwise	Anti-clockwise	Clockwise	Anti-clockwise
Weekday afternoons	Clockwise	Anti-clockwise	Anti-clockwise	Clockwise
Weekends	Clockwise	Anti-clockwise	Clockwise	Clockwise
Notes		Formerly used by the Cranbourne, Pakenham and Sandringham lines.	Formerly used by the Sunbury and Werribee lines.	Alamein trains only operate via the City Loop on weekdays. Trains from Glen Waverley never operate via the City Loop. Services to Blackburn and Alamein do not operate via the City Loop during weekday afternoons.

== Stations ==
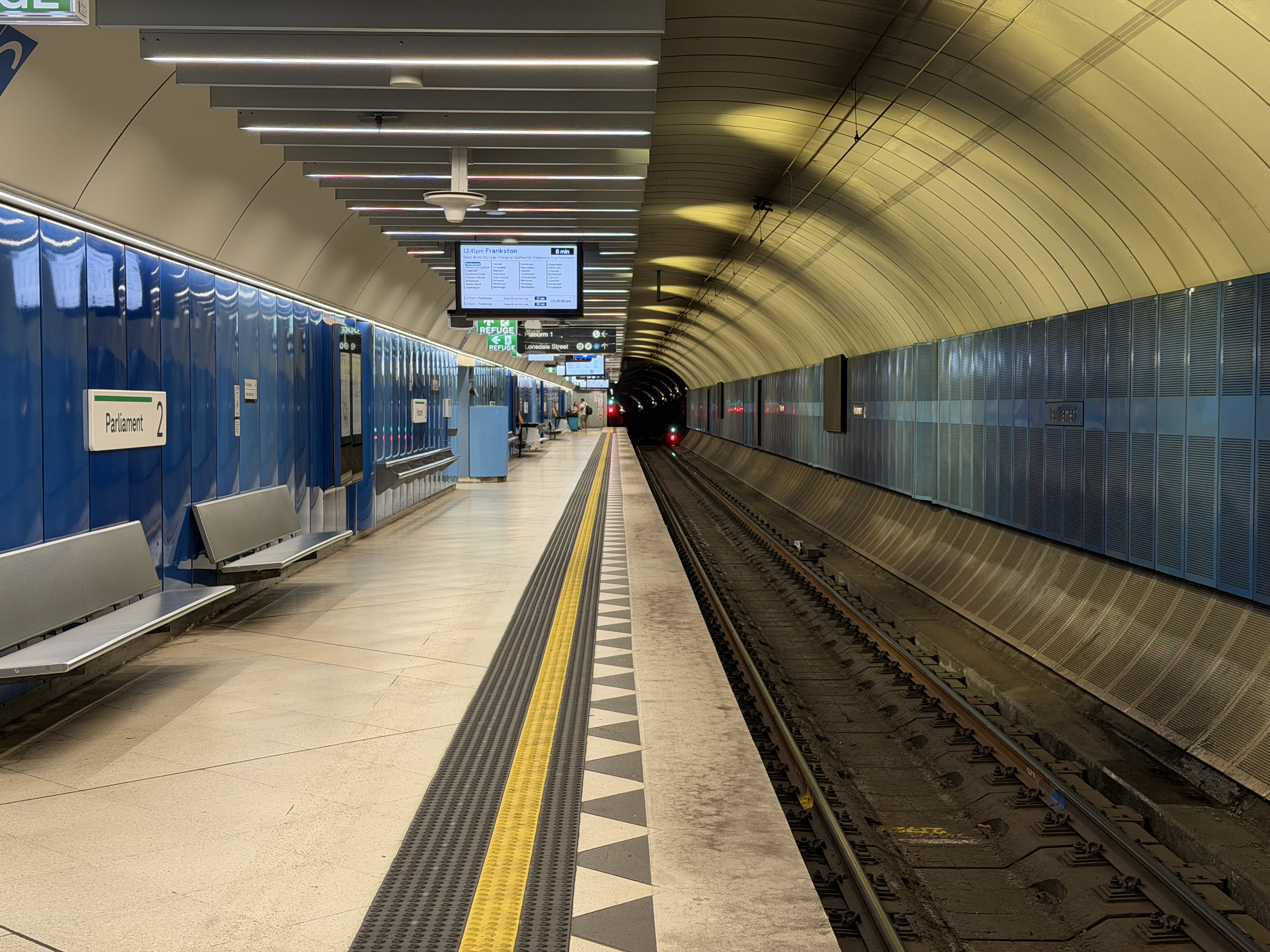
Parliament station Platform 2 in February 2026

The City Loop has three underground railway stations at Parliament, Melbourne Central, and Flagstaff. The stations were opened in the 1980s, with Melbourne Central being the oldest, opening in 1981, and Flagstaff the last to open in 1985. Each railway station features four tracks with two island platforms stacked on top of each other.

=== Parliament ===
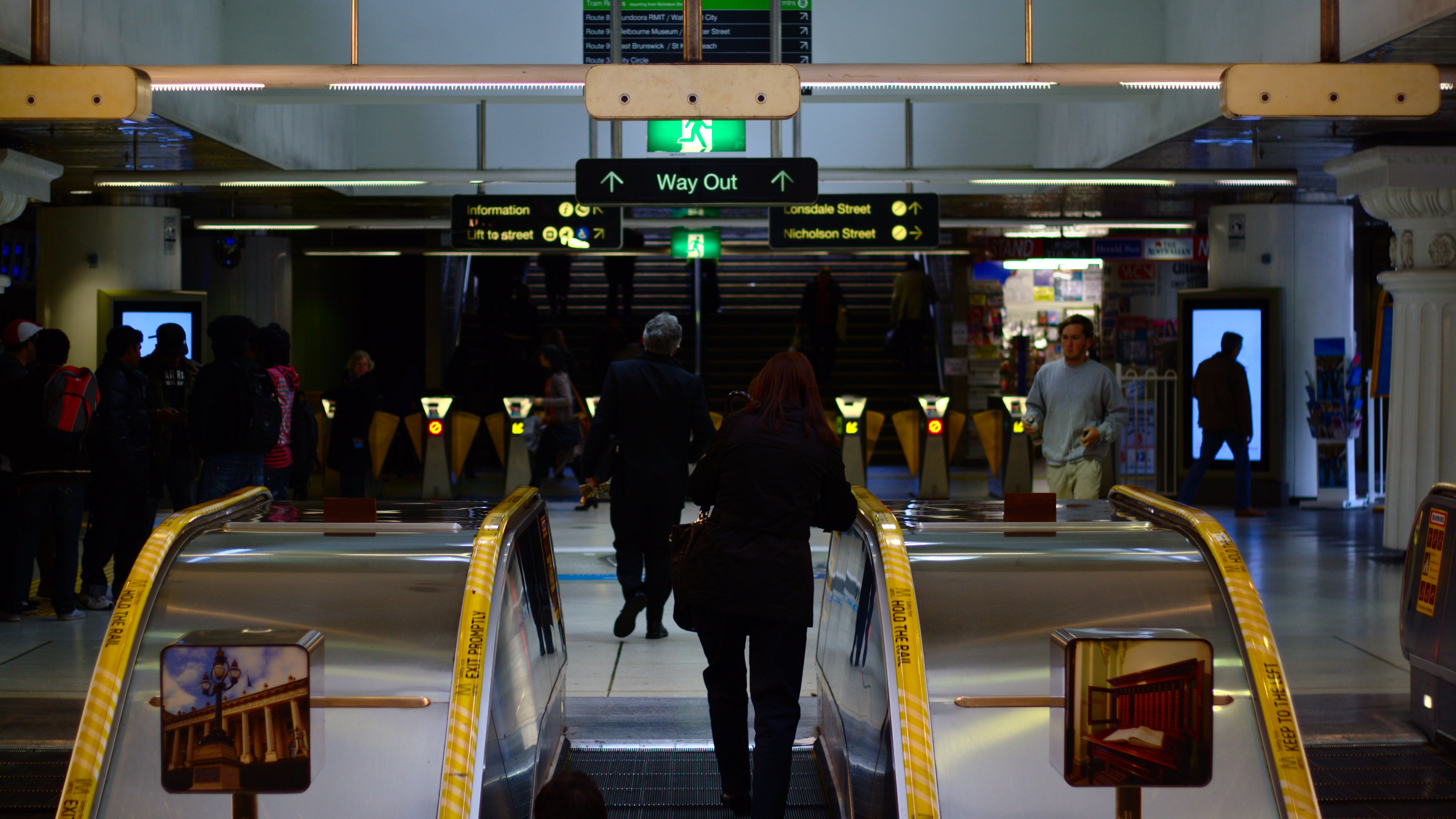
Escalators at Parliament station

Parliament station opened in 1983 and serves the eastern end of the CBD. The station has entrances on Lonsdale Street and on Macarthur Street. The station gets its name from its proximity to the Parliament of Victoria. The station has interchanges with three tram routes on Nicholson Street and two tram routes on Macarthur Street.

=== Melbourne Central ===
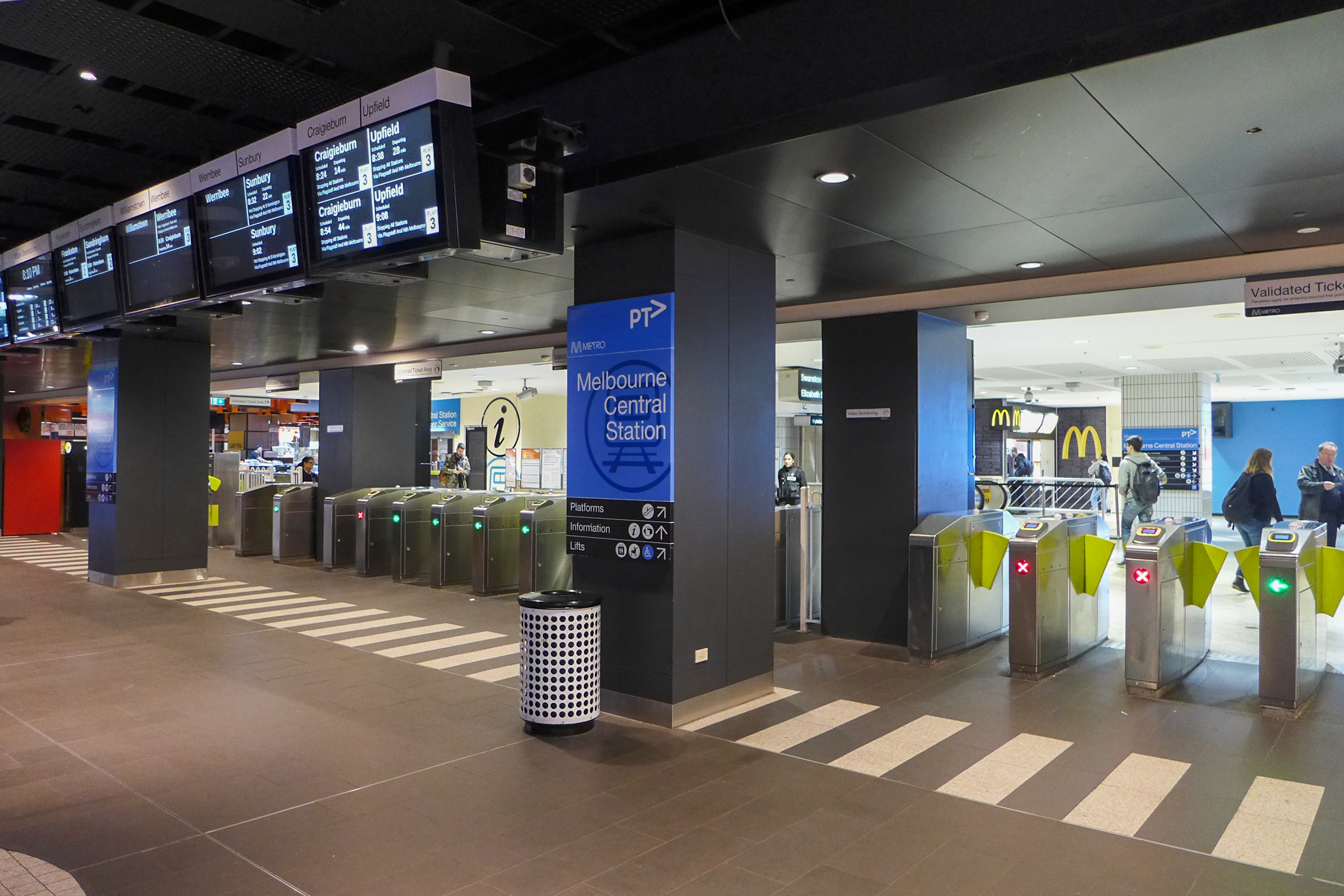
Melbourne Central Station fare gates in 2017.

Melbourne Central opened in 1981 as Museum Station. The station received its original name from the Melbourne Museum, which was located within the State Library of Victoria. The station's name was changed in 1997 to Melbourne Central following the 1991 redevelopment of the site above the station to Melbourne Central Shopping Centre and the relocation of the Melbourne Museum to a new building in Carlton Gardens.

Melbourne Central station is unique as it has only one direct street-facing entrance to the station on Elizabeth Street, with a second entrance located inside of the shopping centre. There used to be a second street-facing entrance on Swanston Street, but that was removed as part of the development of Melbourne Central. The station interchanges with 15 bus routes on Lonsdale Street, three tram routes on Elizabeth street, eight tram routes on Swanston Street and two tram routes on La Trobe Street.

=== Flagstaff ===
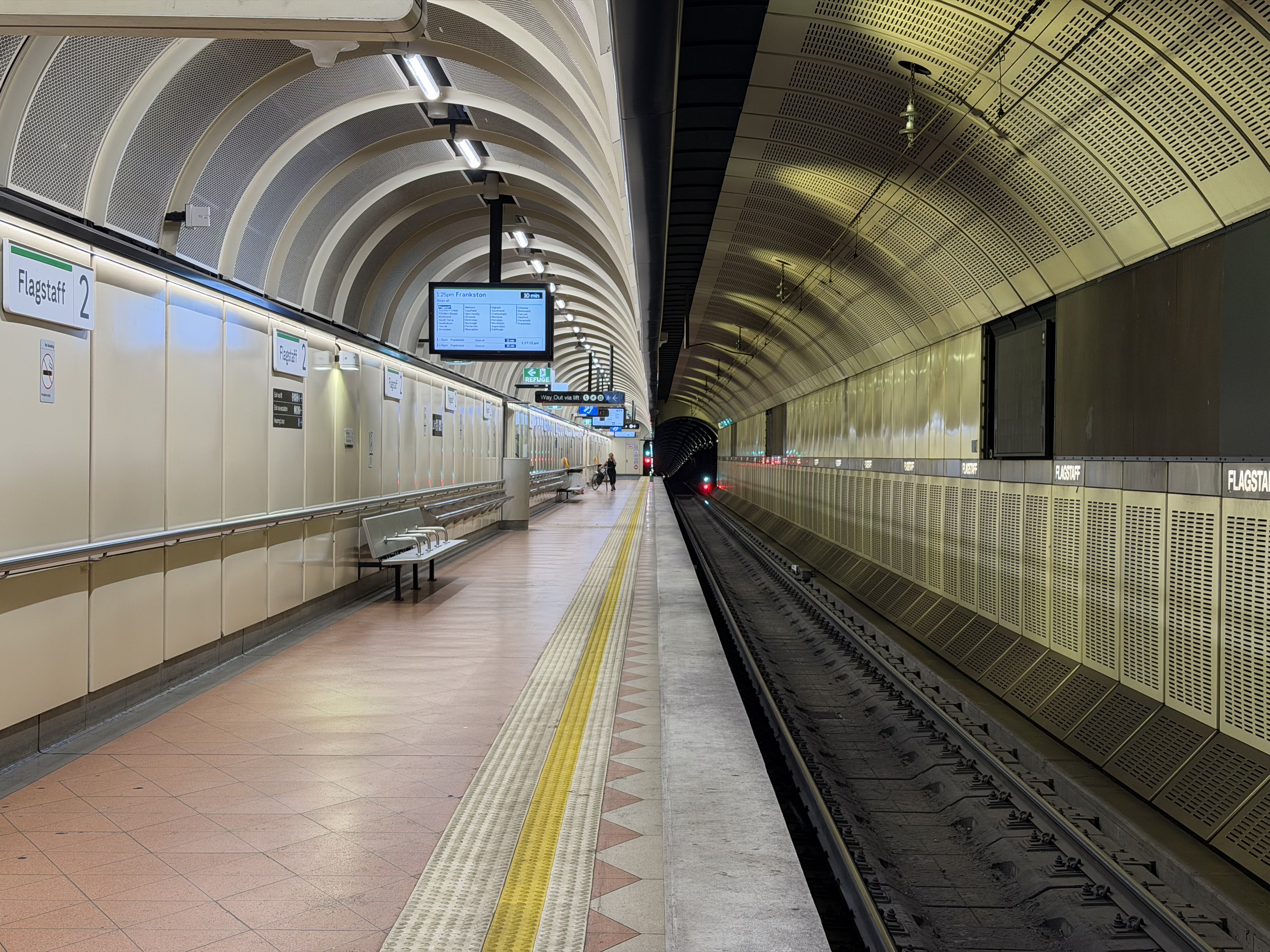
Flagstaff station Platform 2 in February 2026

Flagstaff station opened in 1985 and serves the Western end of the CBD. The station owes its name because of its proximity to Flagstaff Gardens, which is just north of the station. The station features two entrances on the William/La Trobe street intersection. The station interchanges with two tram routes on Latrobe Street and two tram routes on William Street

== Future ==
=== Reconfiguration ===
The Network Development Plan – Metropolitan Rail in 2012 proposed reconfiguring the City Loop. Once complete, the reconfiguration would help the network to run seven independent lines with dedicated access in the CBD. The proposal was again included in the 30-year Infrastructure Strategy for 2021–2051 from the independent government advisory body Infrastructure Victoria, as recommendation 60.

The project would see up to 3 kilometres (1.9 mi) of new tunnel built, creating new entrances to the existing City Loop tunnels. Two of the four City Loop tunnels would be 'split' from the loop, and run as an independent pair of underground cross-city tracks from Richmond station to North Melbourne station. This would allow more trains to pass through the city rather than travelling around the City Loop, and would free up a pair of tracks between Flinders Street station and Southern Cross on the Flinders Street Viaduct for a second cross-city route. According to Infrastructure Victoria, the project would deliver two-thirds of the capacity uplift of the Metro Tunnel for a fraction of the cost.

The main purpose of reconfiguring the City Loop is to allow more services to operate across the network using existing infrastructure. Infrastructure Victoria in its 30-year strategy argued the Craigieburn metropolitan line, the Shepparton regional line and the Seymour regional line would reach capacity in the 2030s, and the City Loop would be heavily congested by 2036. After the Metro Tunnel opens, services would still be constrained by the Craigieburn line sharing a single City Loop track with the Upfield line. Reconfiguration would allow both lines to run more services, and allow more frequent services on the Glen Waverley and Frankston lines.

Infrastructure Victoria envisioned Glen Waverley and Alamein services running through to the Upfield line via the Flinders Street Viaduct and Frankston services running through to the Craigieburn line via the reconfigured City Loop track pair, which differs from the post-reconfiguration network outlined in stage 4 of the 2012 Network Development Plan.

The reconfiguration would also allow for suburban extensions of the rail network, including extending the Upfield line to the northern growth suburbs of Donnybrook, Beveridge and Wallan. Infrastructure Victoria recommended the state government complete a business case into the project.

== Service history ==
=== Clifton Hill/City Circle Loop ===
From opening, services on the Epping and Hurstbridge lines operated through the Clifton Hill Loop alongside the City Circle train service. The City Circle service was discontinued in 1994 and replaced by the City Circle tram.

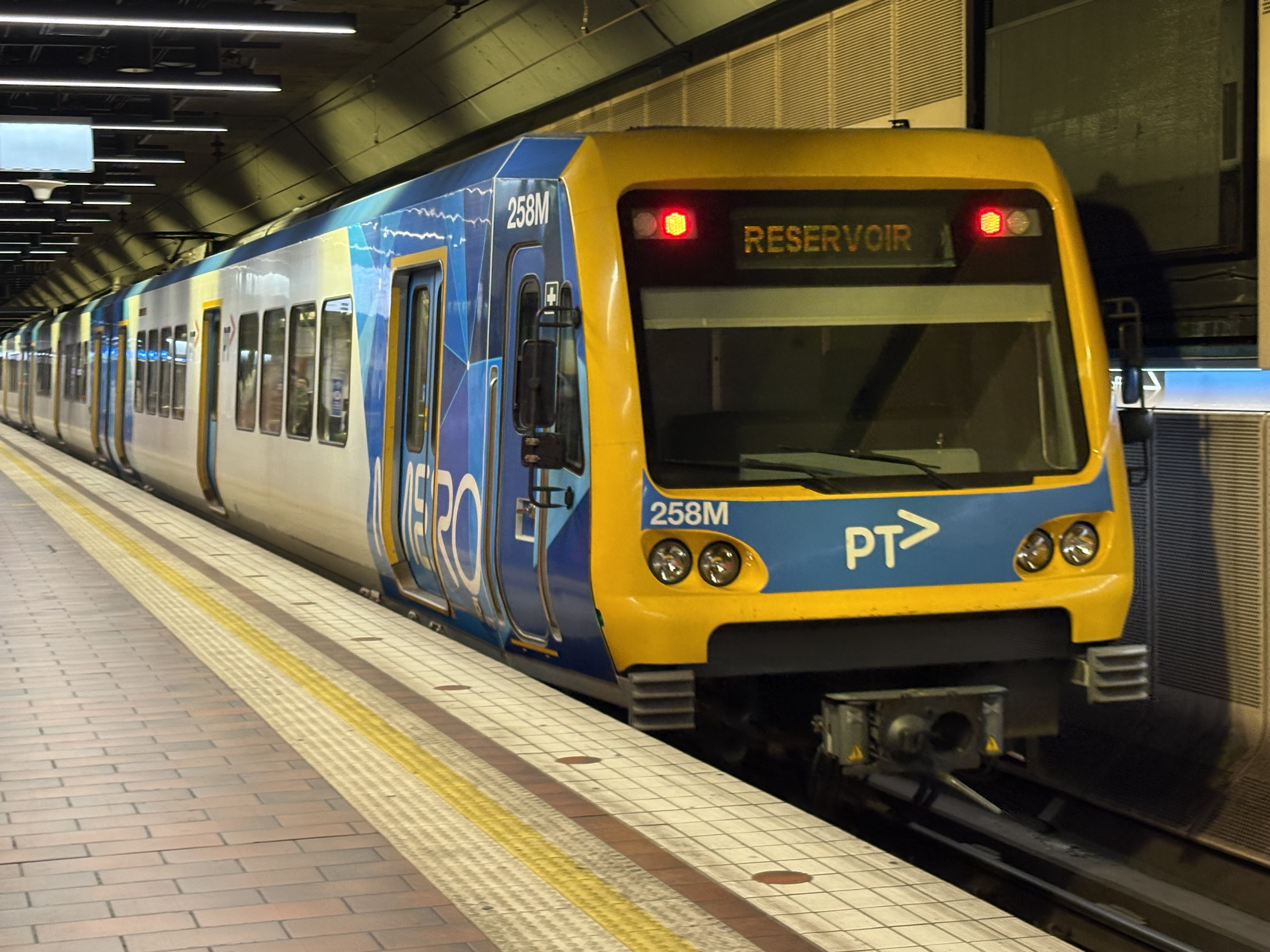
A service in the Clifton Hill Loop

Prior to a major timetable change in November 2008, the Clifton Hill Loop changed direction just like every other loop at midday on weekdays. In the mornings, services ran from Jolimont to Flinders Street via the City Loop then from Flinders Street direct to Jolimont. On weekday afternoons, services ran direct from Jolimont to Flinders Street then from Flinders Street via the City Loop to Jolimont. This operation led to up trains needing to crossover at Jolimont to access the City Loop and conflicting with down trains. The new timetable eliminated this conflict. This timetable change also saw weekend services altered to run anti-clockwise. Another timetable change in 2013 altered weekend services to run clockwise.

=== Caulfield Loop ===
From opening, the Sandringham, Frankston, Pakenham, and later the Cranbourne line after opening in 1995. The Sandringham line was altered which saw roughly half of weekday services run direct to and from Flinders Street. In 1996, a timetable revamp for the southeastern lines saw the Sandringham line altered again to run direct consistently on weekdays. The Met cited the fact that in order for Sandringham line trains to access the loop, trains would have to cross to and use the Frankston line loop entrance. Weekend services however continued to use the City Loop.

From 6 June 2010 however, weekday express services from Frankston were removed from the loop and altered to run direct as part of a wider timetable change to allow for more peak services from Dandenong.

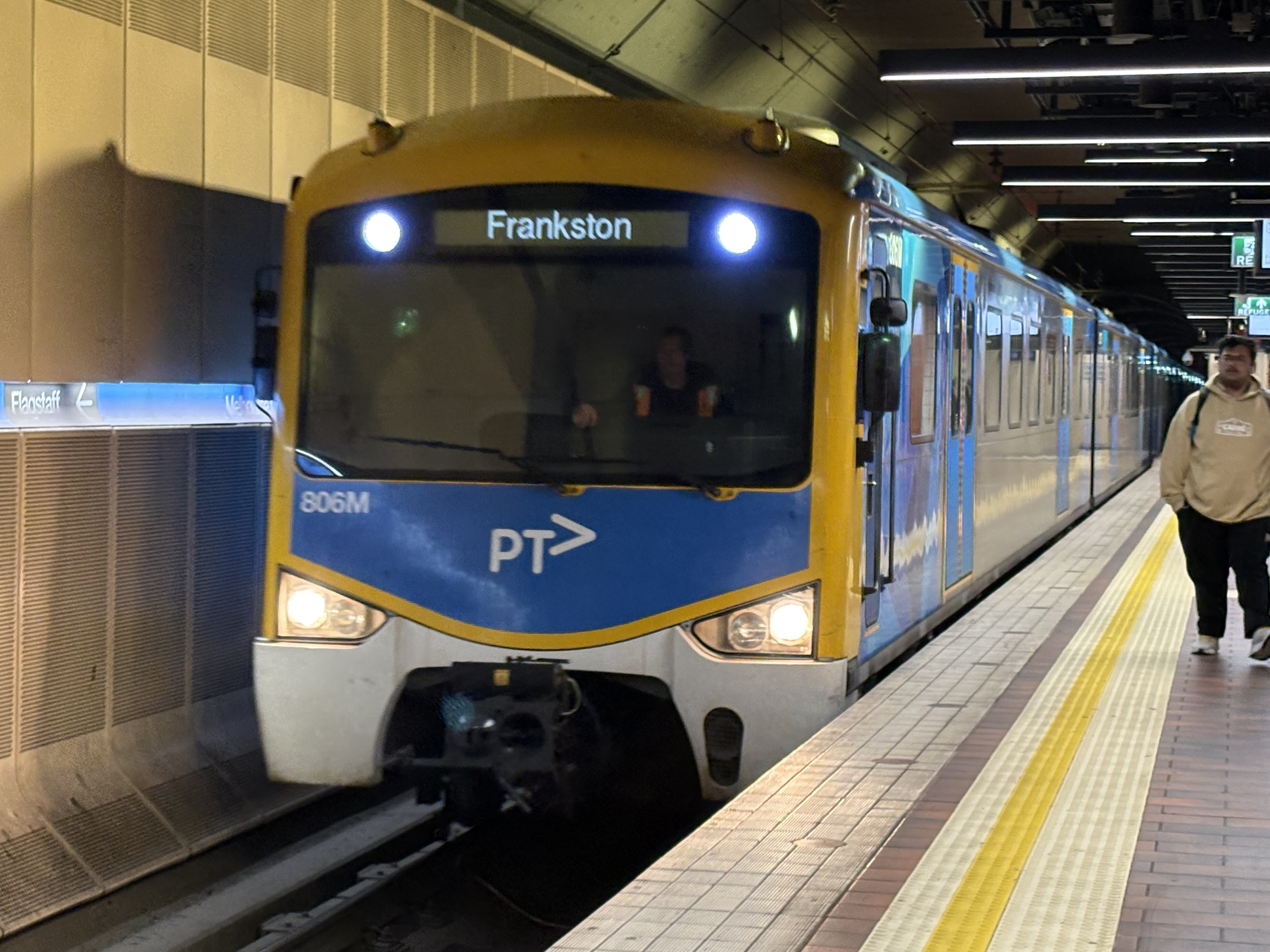
A service in the Caulfield Loop

From 8 May 2011, another major Metro timetable revision saw almost all services on the Frankston line altered to run direct to and from Flinders Street. Select peak hour services and all weekend services continued to operate via the City Loop.

On 31 January 2021, another major timetable revision saw the remaining Frankston and Sandringham line loop services altered to run direct to and from Flinders Street. This change also saw the Cranbourne and Pakenham lines altered to run anti-clockwise only.

Following the opening of the Metro Tunnel and the 'Big Switch' on 1 February 2026. The Cranbourne and Pakenham lines were removed from the City Loop entirely. This revision also saw the return of the Frankston line to the City Loop with services running anti-clockwise consistently, following the post 2021 operation.

=== Northern Loop ===
From its opening, the Northern Loop was served by the Altona (later Werribee), Broadmeadows, St Albans, and Upfield lines.

During the early 2000s, services across the Werribee and Sydenham lines were progressively but not substantially in amount altered to run direct to Flinders Street. This culminated in 2008 as a major timetable revision to the Northern Group which saw all peak hour Werribee line services altered to run direct to and from Flinders Street.

After a timetable change on the Werribee line in 2010, additional services were introduced on the Werribee line with the completion of a third platform at Laverton. All of these services were timetabled to run direct to and from Flinders Street.

The Werribee line was altered again in May 2011 as part of a network wide timetable revision. This change saw the remainder of weekday Werribee line services altered to run direct to and from Flinders Street. Weekend services on the Werribee line however continued to operate via the City Loop.

In 2012, the Northern Loop had all of its weekend services altered. The change saw services switched to run clockwise through the loop all day instead of the previous anti-clockwise arrangement.

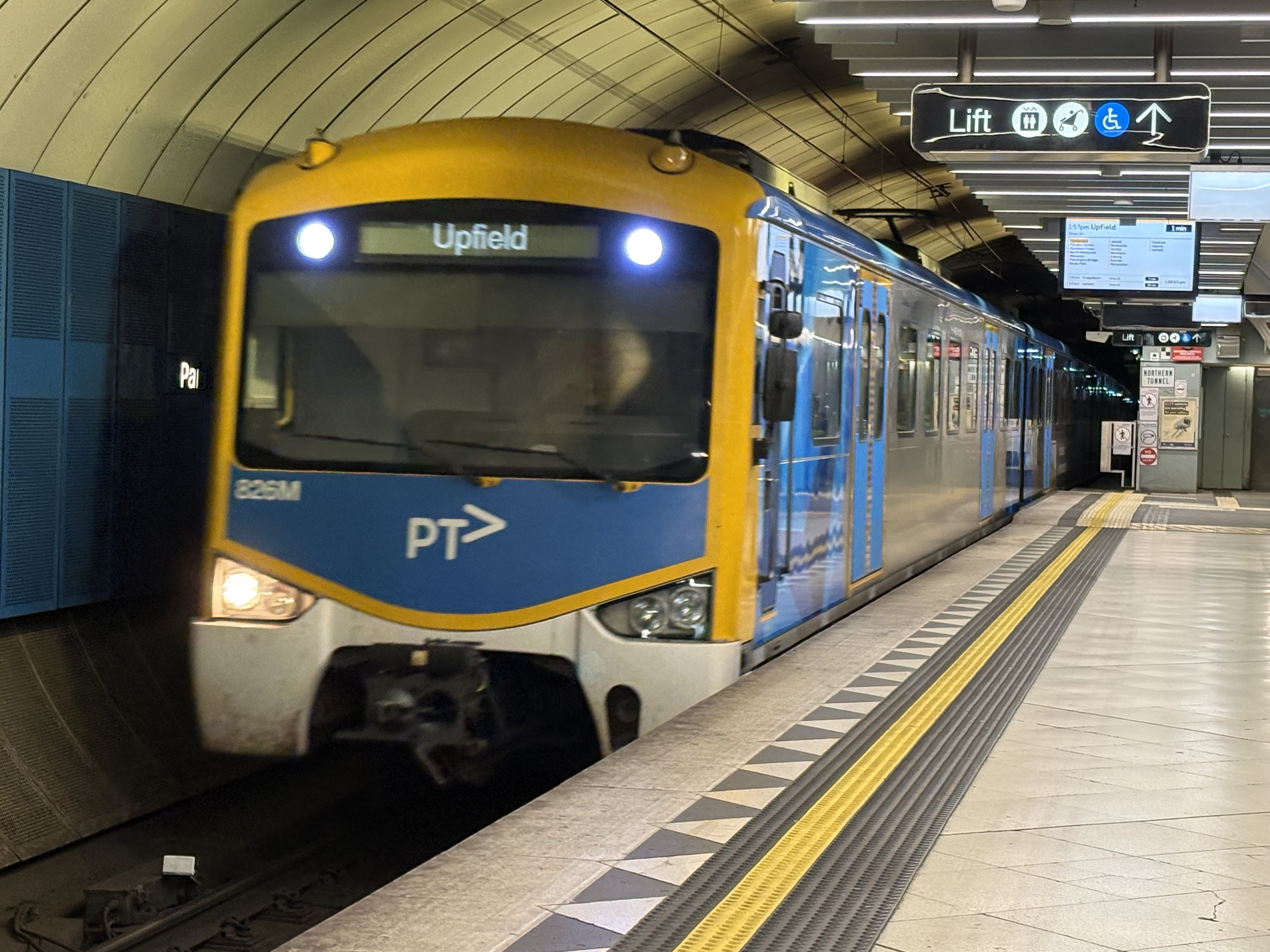
A service in the Northern Loop

As part of the wider network timetable change on 31 January 2021, all remaining weekend Werribee line services through the City Loop were altered to instead continue direct to and from Flinders Street.

From 1 February 2026, the Sunbury line was removed from the City Loop and Flinders Street as part of the Big Switch. The Sunbury line was altered to run exclusively via the Metro Tunnel.

=== Burnley Loop ===
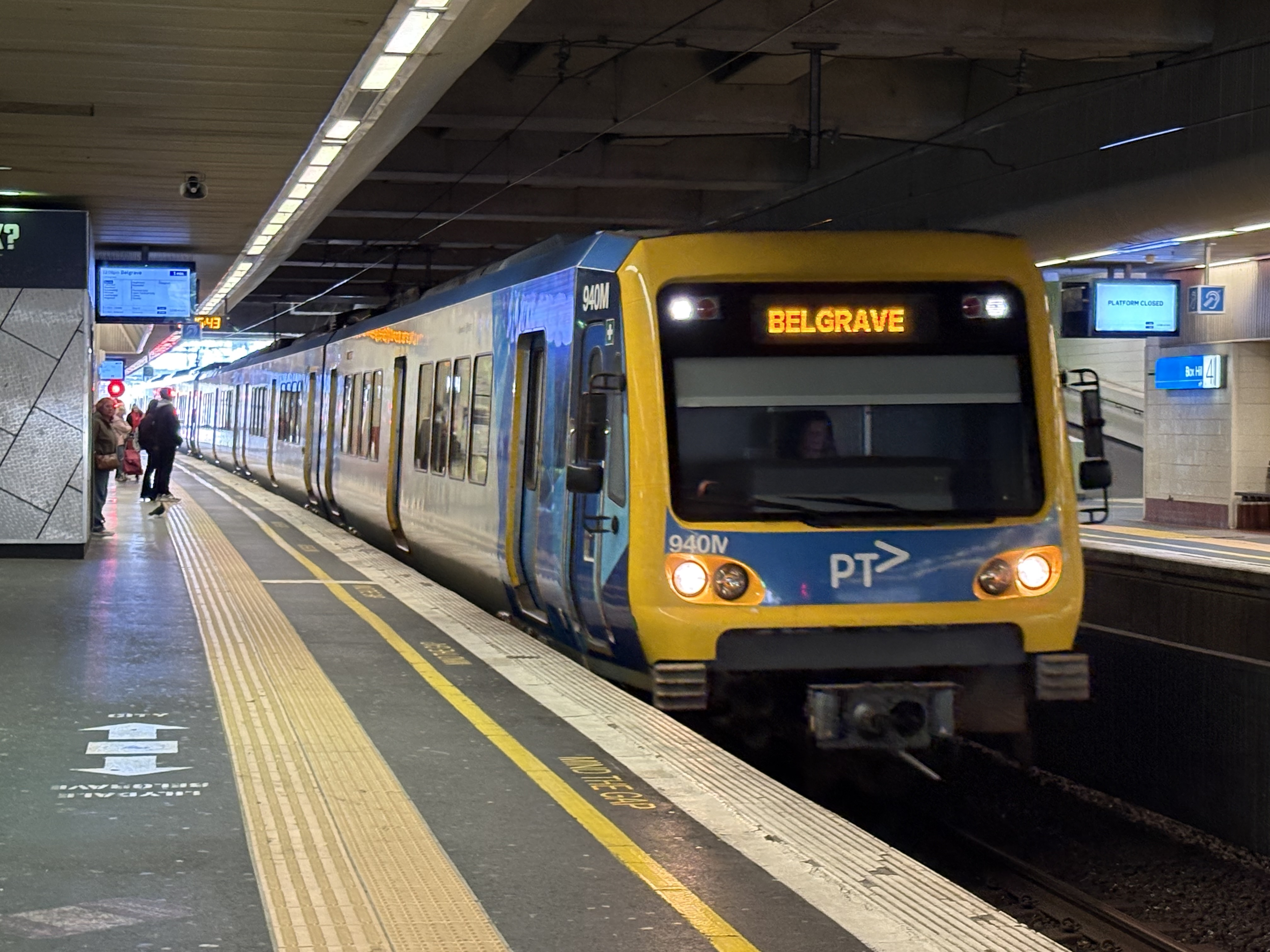
A service of Burnley Group

From opening, the Burnley Loop catered for services on the Alamein, Belgrave, Glen Waverley and Lilydale lines, although the Alamein line only operated to Flinders Street and through the City Loop during peak periods on weekdays.

Services through the Burnley Loop remained mostly unchanged for decades with the exception of new services, some of which were timetabled to run direct to and from Flinders Street.

By 2010, services to Glen Waverley, Ringwood, Belgrave and Lilydale consistently ran through the City Loop with services to Alamein and Blackburn consistently running direct to and from Flinders Street.

As part of the May 2011 wider network timetable change. All services from Glen Waverley on weekday mornings were altered to run direct to and from Flinders Street. This change allowed services from Blackburn and Alamein to run via the loop to Flinders Street in the morning. Service patterns remained the same on weekday afternoons however, with Glen Waverley line services running via the loop to Richmond with Alamein and Blackburn services running direct.
