= Frederick Esling =

Frederick Karl Esling
- Born: 20 July 1860; Creswick, Victoria, Australia
- Died: 31 July 1955 (aged 95); Box Hill, Victoria, Australia
- Engineering career
- Discipline: civil engineer
- Projects: Flinders Street Viaduct; Saltwater River Rail Bridge

Frederick Karl Esling (20 July 1860—31 July 1955) was an Australian railway engineer and chess master.

== Railway career ==
Esling was engineer-in-charge in the Way and Works branch of the Victorian Railways department, located at Flinders Street. Among the many important works that Esling carried out were the building of the Flinders Street Viaduct, the replacement of the spans of the Saltwater River Rail Bridge over the Maribyrnong River (formerly the Saltwater River), refurbishment of the Moorabool Viaduct, and the complicated lay-out of the tracks at the Flinders street station and yards. The refurbishment of the Saltwater River Rail Bridge, which was carried out inside the old bridge with minimal interruption to rail traffic, was a complex piece of work that excited much interest in engineering circles.

Esling presided over the topping-out ceremony on the Flinders Street station clock tower in 1909, when he laid the last brick and was presented with the ceremonial trowel. He published a number of technical papers, including one based on his work on the Flinders Street viaduct, which identified a puzzling problem related to the horizontal forces due to braking, in combination with side forces from wind-pressure. He resigned from his railway position in 1917, partly because he did not consider that he had been treated fairly as regards his promotion.

== Chess Master ==
At the age of 18, Esling won an offhand game against Adolf Anderssen. He won the first Australian Chess Championship by defeating George H. D. Gossip in a match in 1886. Gossip, having emigrated from England to Melbourne in 1885, issued a challenge the following year to any player in the Australian colonies to play him in a match for 20 pounds a side and the title of Australian champion. While Gossip was considered to be strong than any other Australian/Victorian chess player at the time, Esling, also a leading Melbourne player, accepted the challenge and won the first game with the 2nd game being adjourned in favourable position, after which illness forced Gossip to forfeit the match. In 1950, shortly before Esling's 90th birthday, the Australian Chess Federation formally decreed that this match victory had made Esling Australia's first champion. Esling finished second in the Second Australian Championship, a tournament held at Adelaide 1887, with 7 out of 9 points, behind Henry Charlick (7.5) but ahead of Gossip (6.5).

In 1895, Esling challenged Alfred Edward Noble Wallace of Sydney, the reigning Australian champion, to a match for the title. It was played in Melbourne between 8 June and 11 July, and aroused great interest. Wallace narrowly won, winning seven games and losing five, with four draws. In a letter published in The Sydney Mail, he graciously wrote that "after the close fight we have had, I cannot as much as I would like to - think myself a better player than my late opponent, F.K. Esling, champion of Victoria".
