= Banana Alley =

Historic building in Melbourne, Australia

Coordinates: 37.8197°S 144.9622°E

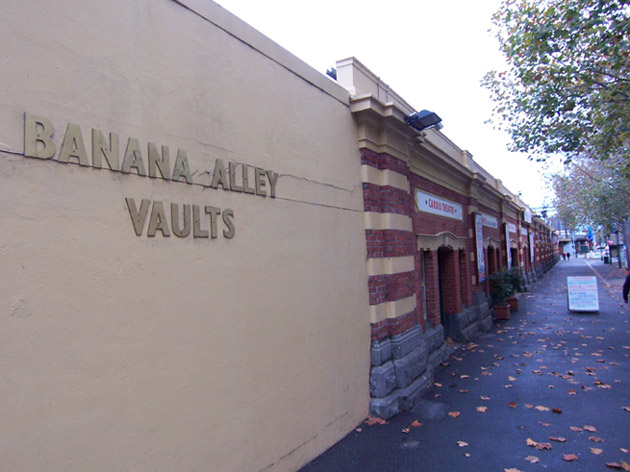
Outside of Banana Alley on Flinders Street

The Banana Alley Vaults are near the Flinders Street station in Melbourne, Australia and extend onto the North Bank of the Yarra River.

Built in 1891–92, they were originally known as the Viaduct Buildings, and were built in conjunction with the tracks of the Flinders Street Viaduct that run overhead. The vaults were originally used by produce agents and fruiterers to store their wares before market. The name "Banana Alley" stems from bananas being stored and ripened here (using ethylene gas) before being sold. The vaults are divided up into 33 separate spaces, with first tenants being recorded in 1893.

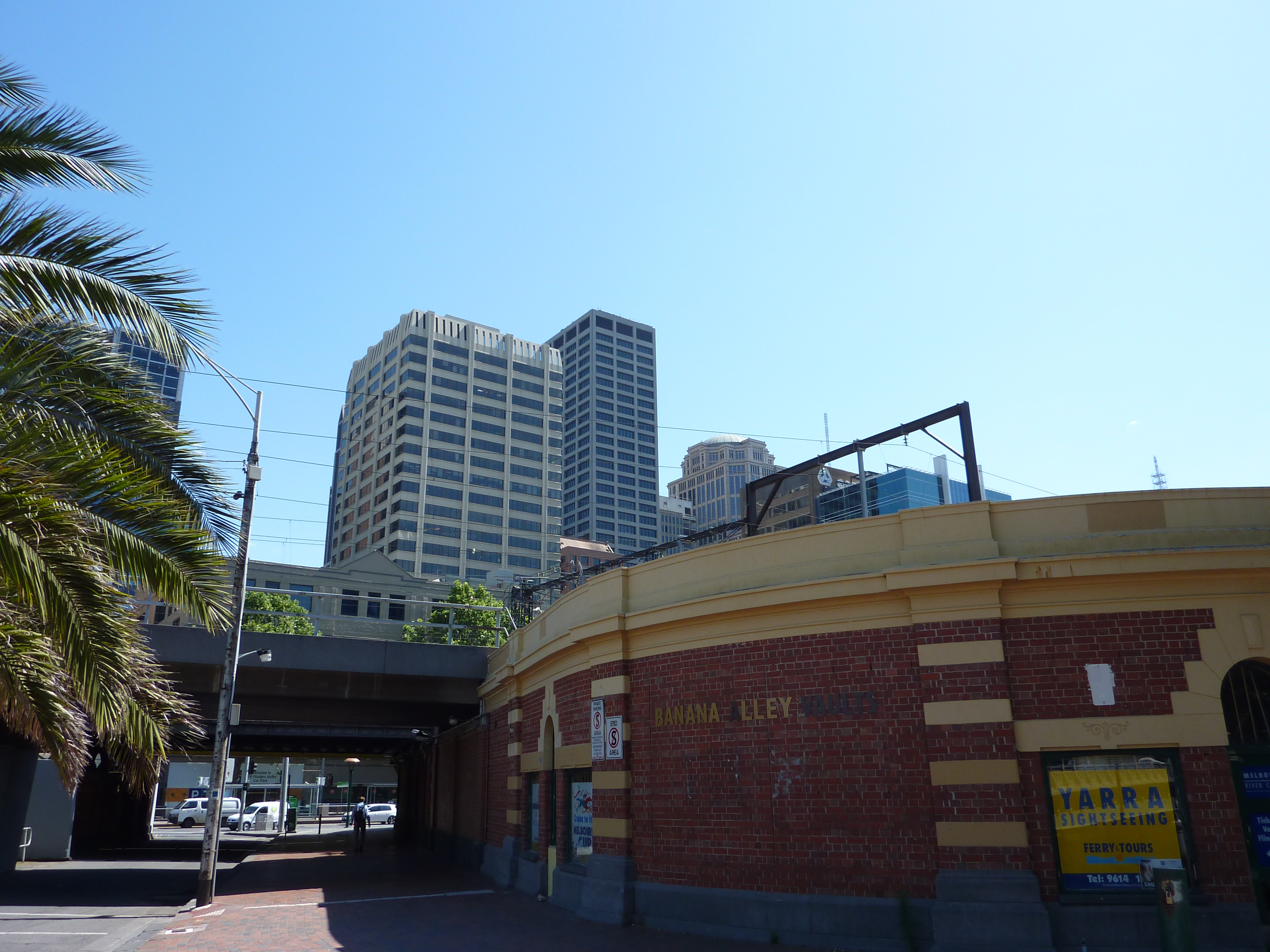
Outside of Banana Alley Vaults on Queen Street

With the construction of the Spencer Street Bridge in 1930, Queens Wharf was rendered inaccessible to cargo ships, and the vaults fell into disuse. A café was opened in one of the vaults in 1936, being joined by the "Pieteria" café selling pies 24 hours a day from the 1950s. Hearns Hobbies also occupied a vault from 1946 until they moved into the basement of Flinders Street station. Other vaults were used by newsagents as a distribution point, and the Victorian Railways Refreshment Services branch as a storage area.

The vaults were neglected and disused for many years and subsequently developed a sinister reputation in the 1970s and 80s. The vaults were used by homeless persons as shelter from Melbourne’s cold nights, and numerous attacks and murders occurred there.

In 1987, the State Government carried out a $4.5 million refurbishment of the vaults in a project aimed at promoting Victorian tourism. The drawcard was "Wine Victoria", which closed after only 2 years of operation, with other vaults becoming vacant as well. The area is again considered one of the sites ripe for development in the central business district, with the redevelopment of the rest of the north bank of the Yarra.

The TV series Canal Road is set at the Banana Alley Vaults. Canal Road is the fictional name for Banana Alley, which contradictory to the show is inaccessible by cars. The fictional Canal Road Centre is located within a shop space of the Banana Alley Vaults.

Nowadays, Banana Alley is host to a number of different businesses who operate within the underground facility, such as a nightclub, a martial arts facility, a barber shop and a gym.
