= Catharine H. Waterman =

American writer

- Born: Catharine Harbison Waterman; April 12, 1812; Philadelphia, Pennsylvania, U.S.
- Died: April 6, 1897 (aged 84); Camden, New Jersey, U.S.
- Resting place: Greenmount Cemetery, Philadelphia
- Occupation: author
- Spouse: George J. Esling (m. 1840; died 1897)
- Writing career
- Genres: poetry; hymns; stories

Catharine H. Waterman (née, Waterman; after marriage, Esling; April 12, 1812 - April 6, 1897) was an American writer and poet who contributed to the periodical literature. Her publications included books, edited volumes, as well as hymns.

== Biography ==
Catharine (sometimes spelled "Catherine") Harbison Waterman (sometimes spelled "Watterman") was born in Philadelphia, Pennsylvania, April 12, 1812.

Under her maiden name, she became known as an author in various periodicals. Her first published pieces appeared in the New York Mirror and subsequently, the Annuals, Graham's Magazine and Godey's Magazine.

Esling wrote hymns, such as "Come Unto Me", which were published in the annual The Christian Keepsake (1839). She stated that her hymns never would have been published but for her mother. In 1841, she edited a volume, Friendship's Offering for 1842. In 1850, her poems were collected and published under the title, The Broken Bracelet and Other Poems. In her later years, she gave up writing.

In 1840, she married Captain George J. Esling, of her native city, who was serving in the Merchant Marine. She resided in Rio de Janeiro from that date until 1844 after which she returned to Philadelphia. In 1883, after her husband's death in Philadelphia, Esling lived with a daughter. She was a member of the Protestant Episcopal Church in Philadelphia,

Esling died April 6, 1897, in Camden. Interment was at Greenmount Cemetery, Philadelphia. She was survived by three sons.

== Selected works ==
=== Books ===
- The Broken Bracelet and Other Poems, 1850
- The Book of parlour games : comprising explanations of the most approved games for the social circle, viz. games of motion, attention, memory, mystification and fun, gallantry and wit, with forfeits, penalities, etc., 1853
- Flora's lexicon : an interpretation of the language and sentiment of flowers : with an outline of botany, and a poetical introduction by Catharine H. Waterman, 1857

=== Hymns ===
- "Come sons of Columbia, while proudly and high"
- "Come unto me when shadows darkly gather"
- "Father, a weary heart hath come"

=== Edited volumes ===
- Friendship's Offering for 1842, 1841
