= Batman Park =

Urban park in Melbourne, Victoria, Australia

Coordinates: 37°49′18.61″S 144°57′23.67″E

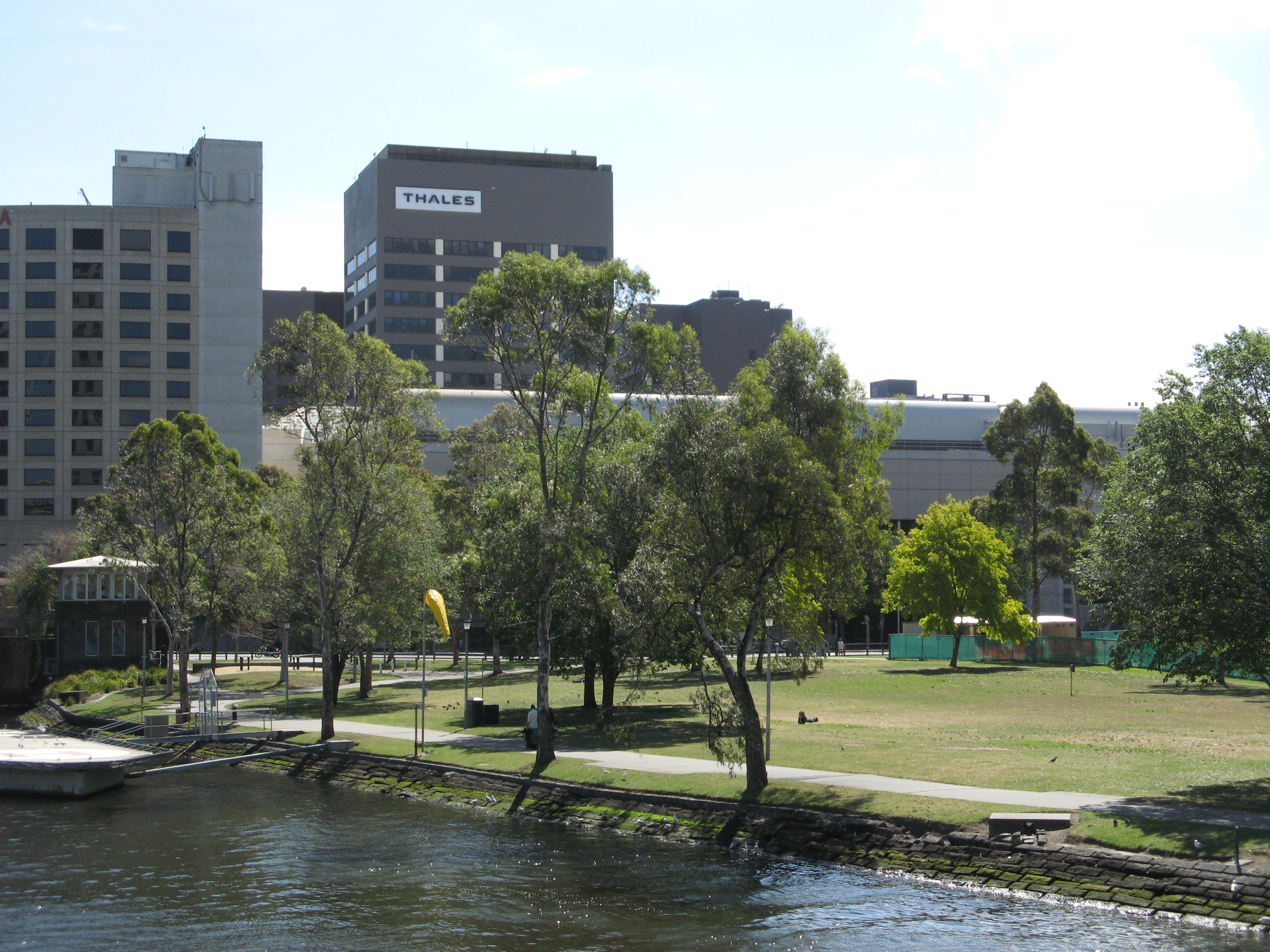
- Batman Park as viewed from Kings Bridge
- Interactive map of Batman Park
- Type: Public park
- Location: Melbourne, Australia
- Opened: 1982
- Operator: Parks Victoria
- Status: Open
- Paths: Sealed paths
- Terrain: Flat riverbank, former riverside wetlands
- Water: Yarra River
- Vegetation: Australian native, non-native lawns
- Public transit: Car, bus, train, tram
- Landmarks: Yarra River
- Facilities: Toilets, barbecues, helicopter landing pad

Batman Park is an urban park, located on the northern bank of the Yarra River in central Melbourne, Victoria, Australia.

Batman Park is a small open grassed space with paths and planted Eucalyptus trees bordered by Spencer Street at the west, Flinders Street Viaduct at the north and King Street to the east.

The park was established in 1982 through the conversion of a disused freight train rail yard and was named after one of the founders of Melbourne, John Batman, with historical associations as a landing place of the Schooner Rebecca and nearby settlement at Batman's Hill.

In 1997 Batman Park was effectively split in half with the section east of King Street rebranded as Enterprize Park. Much of the land on the new park was reclaimed to recreate a historical 1850s turning basin and timber wharf with sculptures by Bruce Armstrong and Geoffrey Bartlett recalling the site's maritime history. Enterprize park also became the site of the Melbourne Aquarium.

== History ==
The site was originally part of the Wurundjeri nation's territory prior to European settlement. At this time the site was part of extensive riverside wetlands. After settlement the area was used as a dumping ground for waste and discharge for sewerage and storm water, destroying the wetlands and turning the site from diverse riverside wetlands to smelly muddy swampland.

Throughout the 19th century the main port of Melbourne, today known as the Turning Basin, directly east of the park, dictated the use of the surrounding land for cargo facilities and rail yards. In the late 19th century more substantial wharfs and docks were constructed in deepened waters downstream, abandoning the cargo facilities and rail yards at the site.

The site remained largely disused throughout much of the mid 20th century until the park was established in 1982. The park was home to Ron Robertson-Swann's Vault sculpture, commonly nicknamed the "Yellow Peril", which was relocated several times throughout the 1980s and 90s. The sculpture has resided at the Australian Centre for Contemporary Art since 2002. In 1997 the original turning basin, which had been filled in during the 1950s, was reinstated, and the portion of Batman Park to the east of Kings Bridge was renamed Enterprize Park after the schooner which landed at the site in 1835.

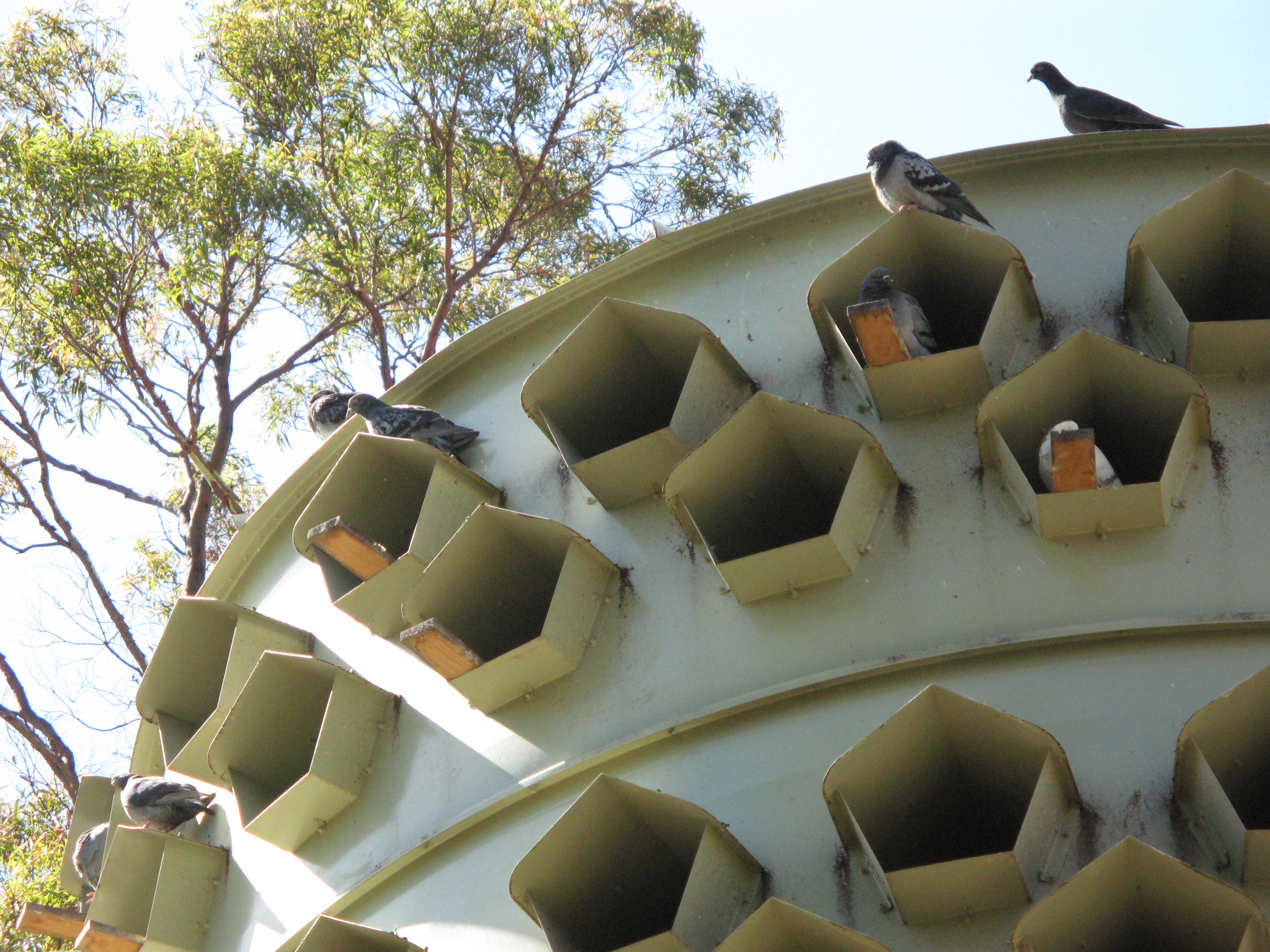
Detail of the pigeon loft.

In 2006 a pigeon loft was built in the north-east corner of the park to encourage pigeons to roost away from the city buildings and streets. Council were particularly concerned about pigeon droppings eroding the facades of historical buildings. Eggs laid in the loft were replaced with dummy eggs for the pigeons to incubate. However, the loft proved to be unsuccessful at attracting pigeons and was removed nine years later in 2015.

In 1999, the Melbourne Aquarium was built directly east of the park, at the western end of Enterprize Park. The park has survived development while surrounding sites have not, construction of residential apartments has begun on the former Fish Market site to the north of the park opposite the Flinders Street Viaduct, which had formally been proposed as an extension of Batman Park.

== Location, geography and ecology ==
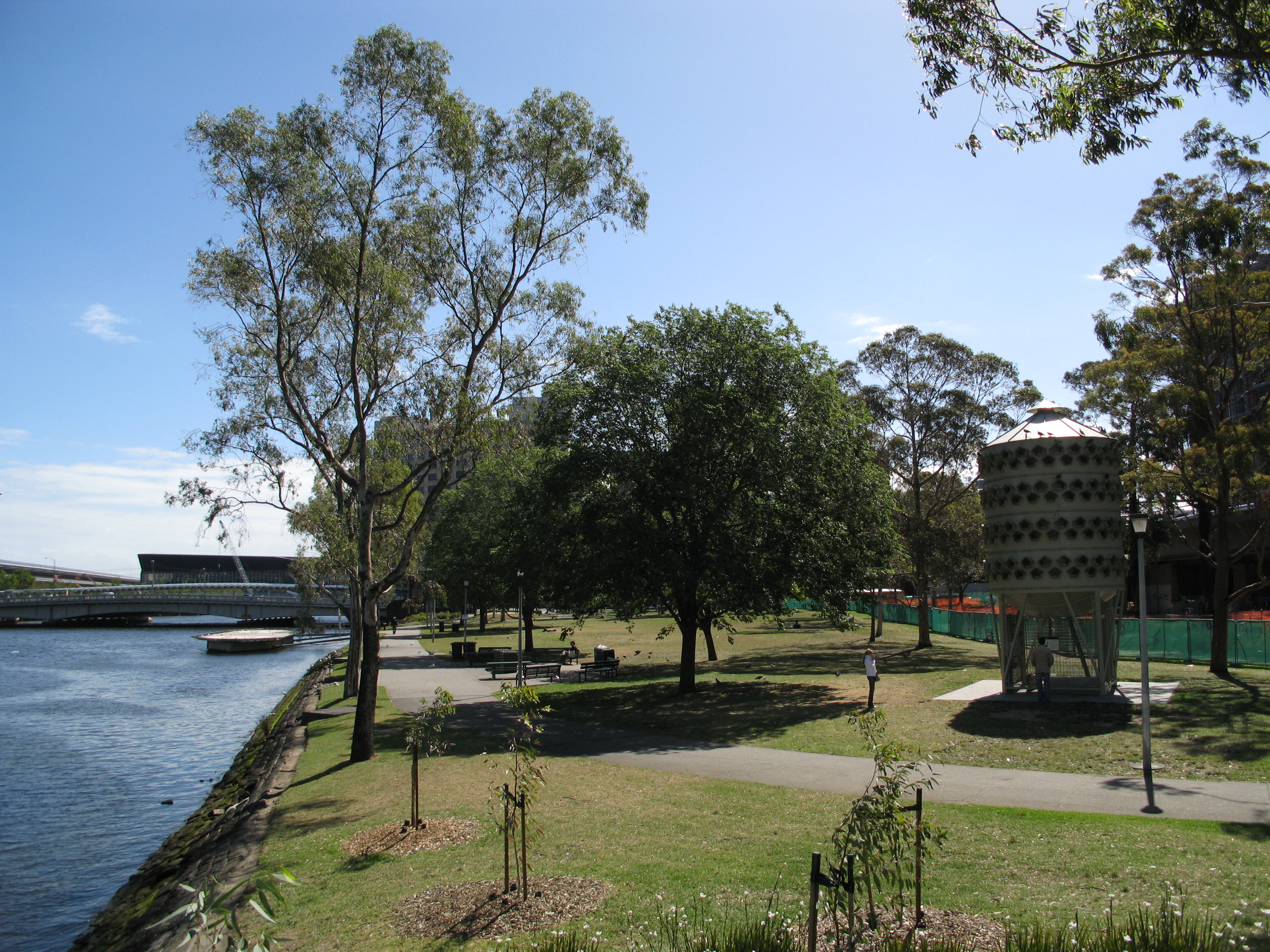
Batman Park, looking west from Kings Way showing the pigeon loft.

The park is located on the northern bank of the Yarra river between Queens Street and Kings Way. Its northern boundary is bordered by the Flinders Street Viaduct which was constructed around the same time the park was founded, the viaduct separated the park from the former Fish Markets which is currently the site of new apartment buildings.

The park sits on an almost flat section of the riverbank that very occasionally floods. Prior to the construction of the Upper Yarra Dam, the site flooded more regularly, depositing silt and soil, creating swamp and wetlands. Current vegetation in the park consists of sparse maturing eucalypts with no understorey or saplings. The ground is covered by non-native grasses, creating vast lawns which are intersected by a basic network of sealed paths.

== See also ==
- Vault (sculpture)
