= Quay Quarter Tower =

Skyscraper in Sydney, Australia

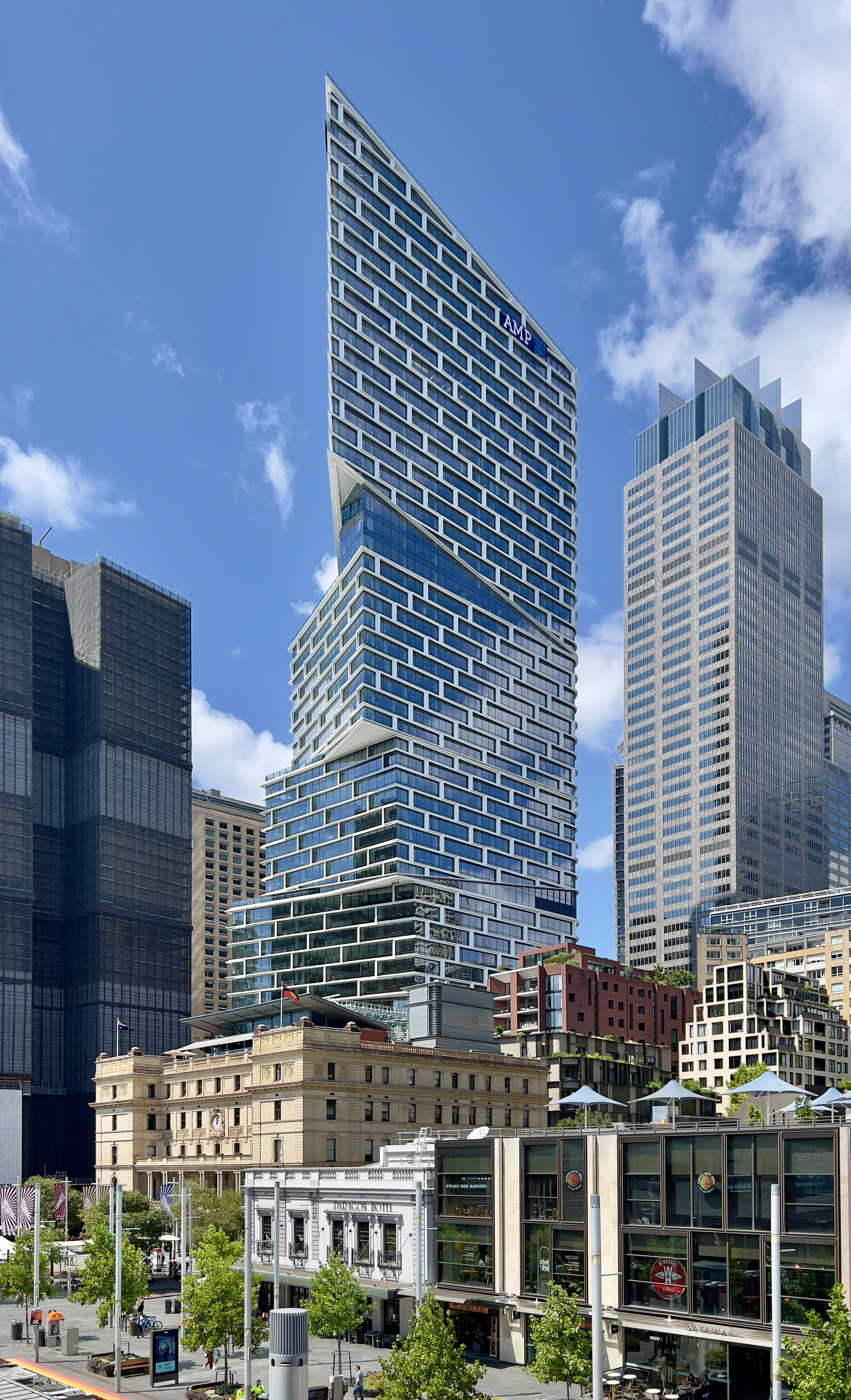
- Quay Quarter Tower, March 2023
- Former names: AMP Centre

General information
- Status: Completed
- Type: Commercial
- Location: 50 Bridge Street, Sydney, Australia
- Coordinates: vis 33°51′47″S 151°12′41″E
- Current tenants: AMP; Corrs Chambers Westgarth; Deloitte; EQT
- Opening: 1976
- Renovated: 2018–2021
- Owner: Mirvac Wholesale Office Fund; Dexus Wholesale Property Fund; Rest

Height
- Height: 188 m (617 ft) (1976–2018); 216 m (709 ft) (2022–present)

Technical details
- Floor count: 45 (1976–2018); 54 (2022–present)
- Floor area: 90,000 m^{2} (970,000 sq ft)

Design and construction
- Architect: PTW Architects
- Developer: AMP Capital
- Main contractor: Mainline

Renovating team
- Architects: 3XN & BVN
- Renovating firm: AMP Capital
- Structural engineer: BG&E
- Main contractor: Multiplex

Website
- Official site

Quay Quarter Tower is a skyscraper located at 50 Bridge Street, Sydney, Australia. Built as the AMP Centre in 1976, the structure underwent a redevelopment from 2018 to 2021, which increased its height, introduced cantilevers, created additional office space, and modernised the tower's overall form and design. The AMP Centre re-opened as Quay Quarter Tower in early 2022, and stands at a height of 216 metres (709 ft) with 54 floors.

It is the world's first upcycled skyscraper retaining 68% of the existing building's structure and named World Building of the Year at the 15th annual World Architecture Festival.

== History ==
=== AMP Centre ===
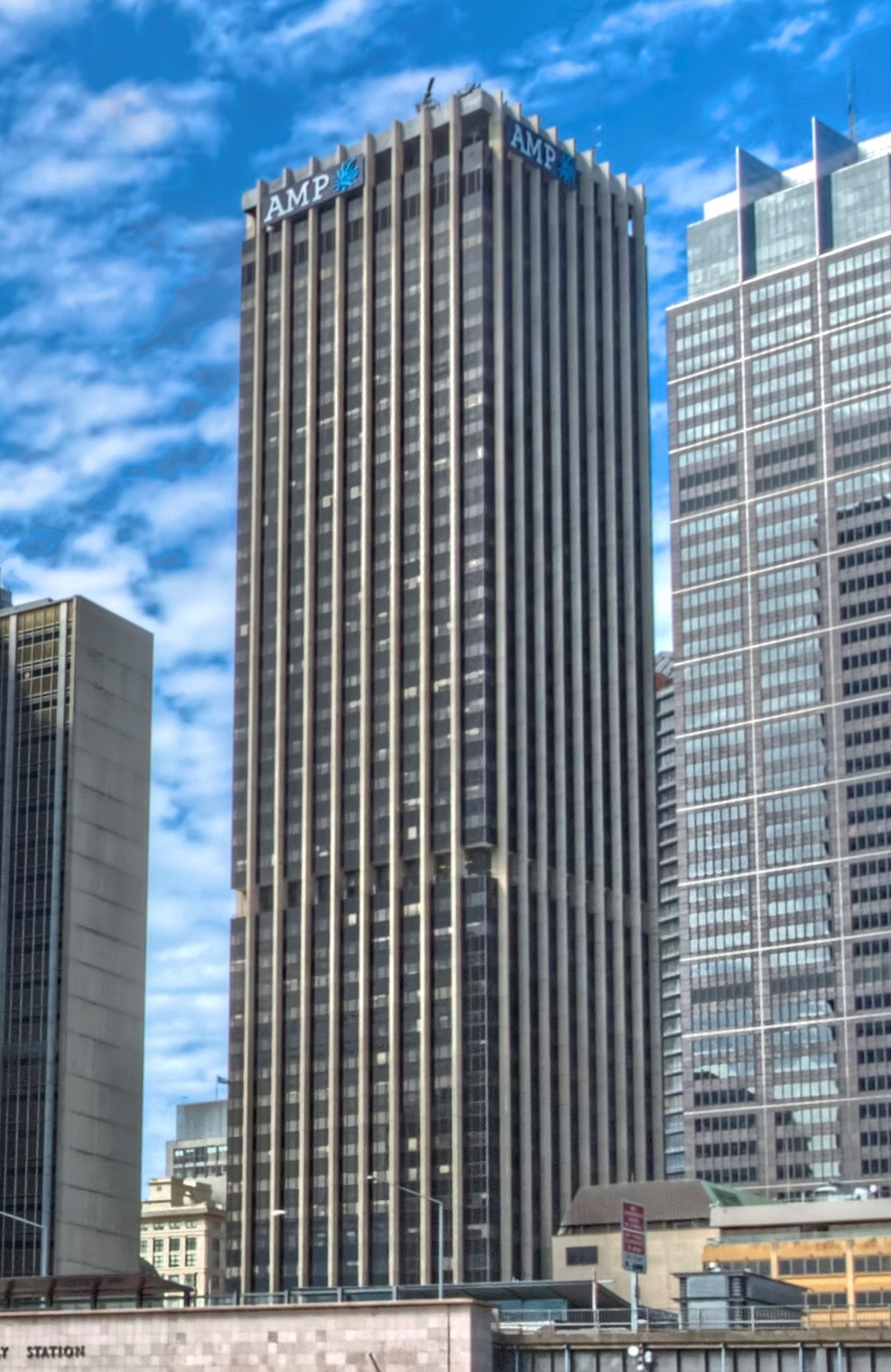
The AMP Centre in 2014, prior to redevelopment

The tower in its original form as the AMP Centre was completed in 1976, consisting of 45 floors. It was used for commercial office space and was made up of concrete, glass, and steel. Designed by Peddle Thorp & Walker and built by Mainline. The centre's roof-height reached 188 m (617 ft), making it the tallest building in Sydney at the time of its completion, prior to the completion of the MLC Centre in 1977. From 2011 until 2017, the Port Authority of New South Wales had a radar on top of the building to track commercial shipping in Sydney Harbour.

=== Quay Quarter Tower ===
In 2013, Australian architectural practice BVN designed a new masterplan for the Quay Quarter Sydney precinct and a design envelope for a new tower. Together with AMP Capital and the City of Sydney, the BVN architects ran a design competition for Quay Quarter Tower. On 24 September 2014, the winning design from architect 3XN was revealed and BVN was appointed Executive Architect to collaborate with 3XN and develop their design concept for construction.

Approval for the project was finalised in November 2015 and construction began in early 2018.

Multiplex was appointed lead contractor and with the work involving a rebuild and reclad of the building's entire exterior; increasing its height, incorporating additional floorspace, and modernising its overall physical form, design and façade. The AMP Centre's internal core, along with 66% of its existing columns, beams and slabs and 95% of its internal walls, were retained as part of the redevelopment. During initial stages of construction, the northern half of the original structure was dismantled, while the rest of the original exterior cladding was stripped off completely. Following this, a new northern section for the structure was gradually built, incorporating it with the existing core and the southern section of the building, which was also reclad in a corresponding new façade.

The redevelopment resulted in a new height of 216 m (709 ft) with 54 floors, a completely new interior layout with twice the amount of total floorspace, and a new cantilevered exterior design. During construction, key-tenant AMP relocated its headquarters in March 2018 into the AMP Building at 33 Alfred Street, while all other commercial tenants found premises elsewhere in the city. The building in its new form, now known as Quay Quarter Tower, was topped out in early 2021, before its completion in early 2022.

In November 2022, architects 3XN and BVN won the International High-Rise Award for Quay Quarter Tower, while in December of that year the building won the World Building of the Year Award at the World Architecture Festival.

In 2023 the tower received the award for the world's best new tall building from the Council on Tall Buildings and Urban Habitat (CTBUH).

Owned by AMP Capital Wholesale Office Fund, Dexus Wholesale Property Fund and Rest, tenants include AMP, Corrs Chambers Westgarth, Deloitte, EQT and Johnson Winter Slattery.
