= Jacksons on George =

General information
- Location: 176 George Street, Sydney, Australia
- Opened: 1986
- Renovated: 2023
- Owner: DTL Entertainment

Technical details
- Floor count: 3

Website
- www.jacksonsongeorge.com.au

Jacksons on George is a pub in the Sydney central business district, Australia. It opened in 1986, closing in 2018 and being demolished along with the adjoining Gold Fields House as part of the construction of Salesforce Tower. It was rebuilt, reopening in September 2023.
