= Gold Fields House =

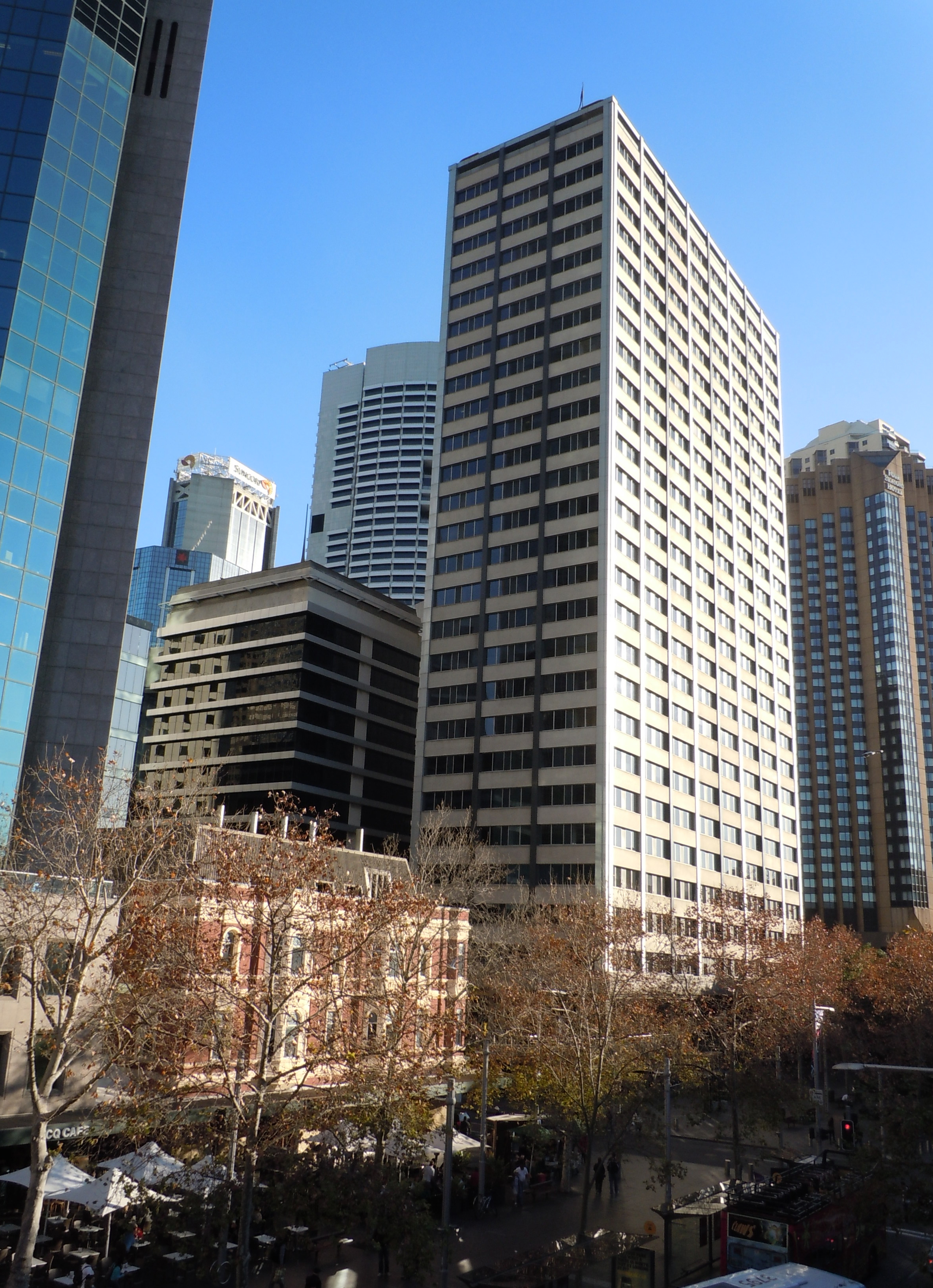

General information
- Status: Demolished
- Type: Office building
- Location: 1 Alfred Street, Circular Quay, Sydney, Australia
- Coordinates: 33°51′42″S 151°12′31″E
- Named for: Consolidated Gold Fields
- Opened: 1966
- Demolished: 2018

Technical details
- Floor count: 27

Design and construction
- Architecture firm: Peddle, Thorp & Walker
- Main contractor: Mainline; Dilingham; Haunstrup

Gold Fields House was a high rise office block in the Sydney central business district on the corner of Alfred and Pitt streets. Completed in 1966, it was one of the earliest high rise buildings in Sydney. The tower of 27 storeys was designed by Peddle, Thorp and Walker "as a balance to the AMP Building" constructed four years earlier in 1962 at the other end of Circular Quay. Together they created a "gateway" to the city of Sydney. It was sold for redevelopment in 2014 and demolished in 2017/2018.

== History ==
Gold Fields House was built for Consolidated Gold Fields by a joint venture of Mainline, Dilingham and Haunstrup. It contained 4,000 tons of structural steel and took two years to complete. The steel frame had cellular steel floors topped with concrete. Its precast concrete panels were supported at floor level and span between the structural columns. Glass mosaic tiles face the external columns. Marble was used in the columns and floor of the foyer.

Construction progress was recorded in a series of drawings by Sydney artist Unk White after making on site sketches at regular intervals.

In June 2006, Gold Fields House was sold by Multiplex to Valad Property Group. In 2011 Valad announced stated in its March quarter update on Thursday that the Sydney Local Environment Plan 2005 (Amendment No. 2), which was previously approved by the Sydney City Council, has been gazetted by the government. Valad targeted Asian investors for a much taller tower.

In January 2015, Valad sold the property to Chinese investors Dalian Wanda Group. The purchasers also bought neighbouring the Fairfax House at 19-31 Pitt Street and The Rugby Club at 31A Pitt Street and consolidated the three blocks on which it is expected that two new towers – one a high rise hotel, and the other a luxury 57-storey apartment complex – will be built. It is planned that the adjacent Alfred, Pitt, Dally and George Streets will be integrated into an overall design that relates to Circular Quay Tower, the Public Square, 200 George Street, and the connecting laneways. The name given to the new development was "Sydney One".

Demolition began in October 2017 amid reports that the Wanda Group would sell the property to reduce its debt load per the demands of Chinese regulators. The sale by Wanda to Huang Jiquan, the son of Chinese political donor Huang Xiangmo, was announced to the Hong Kong Stock Exchange on 29 January 2018. The involvement of Xiangmo's young son (recent graduate Huang Jiquan) and son-in-law (Evan (Xiaozhi) Luo) was reported to be part of a family succession plan. On the morning of 13 February 2018, a fire engulfed the site. Gas cylinders exploded and fire crews had to remove others to prevent more explosions.

Construction of One Circular Quay - a new residential tower with an expected height of 197 metres (646 ft) - on the former Gold Fields House site was originally due to begin in 2019 but never eventuated. In July 2022, the site was sold to Lendlease and Mitsubishi Estate, who will develop it into two towers: one residential tower and the other tower the first ever Waldorf Astoria hotel in Australia, designed by Kerry Hill Architects and Kengo Kuma and Associates respectively.
