= Mainline Corporation =

Former property development & construction company

Mainline Corporation Ltd
- Company type: Public
- Industry: Real estate development, Construction, Hospitality
- Founded: 1961
- Founders: Dick Baker & Laurie O'Neil
- Defunct: 1974
- Fate: Collapsed
- Headquarters: 16th Floor, 54-62 Carrington Street, Sydney, Australia
- Area served: Australia, New Zealand, Fiji, United States of America
- Key people: Dick Baker (CEO), Langer Avery (CFO)
- Services: Construction
- Divisions: Mainzeal Property and Construction Ltd (NZ), Noah's Hotels Ltd (AU), Mainline Contractors (U.S.A.) Pty Limited (US).
- Subsidiaries: Mainline Constructions Pty Ltd (NSW), Mainline Constructions (A.C.T.) Pty Ltd (ACT), Mainline Constructions (VIC.) Pty Ltd (VIC), Mainline Contractors Pty Ltd (NZ), Mainline Millers Constructions (Fiji) Ltd, Mainline Marshall Pty Ltd (SA), Mainline Equities N.V., Mainline Development N.V., Mainline Davis N.V.(Netherlands).

Mainline Corporation Ltd ("Mainline") was one of Australia's largest construction companies during the late 1960s and early 1970s. Mainline Corporation was responsible for building some of Australia's most notable landmark buildings before its collapse in 1974. The company at its height was involved in large-scale and high-rise property development and construction in Australia, New Zealand, Fiji and the United States of America. Mainline also operated a hotel chain in Australia, New Zealand and United States of American under the brand name Noah's which notably built and operated the Noah's Lakeside Hotel in Canberra, Australia as its flagship business.

== History ==
Mainline Corporation was established in 1961 by Richard ("Dick") Baker and Laurie O'Neil as a small construction company in Sydney building apartment blocks in Double Bay and Potts Point. Dick Baker was appointed as the Chief Executive Officer (CEO) of Mainline Corporation and by 1965 it had expanded into commercial developments including the AMP Building and Gold Fields House. In 1967, Langer Avery was appointed as Chief Financial Officer (CFO) of Mainline Corporation Ltd and held the position until 1974.

In December 1968, Mainline Corporation Ltd was listed on the Sydney Stock Exchange. Major shareholders were AMP Limited, L.C. O'Neil Enterprises Pty Ltd (Laurie O'Neil) and W.R. Carpenter Holdings Ltd (Walter Randolph Carpenter).

In June 1971, Mainline Corporation paid $1.35 million for a site in Canberra CBD.

In August 1971, Mainline Corporation declared a consolidated net profit of $844,203 for FY71 on the back of a revenue of $41.5 million for FY71.

In August 1972, Mainline Corporation declared a consolidated net profit of $1,722,258 for FY72 on the back of a revenue of $56 million for FY72. The value of the reported building contracts in hand at 30 June 1972 was $123 million.

In 1972, Mainline Corporation acquired Dunkerley Hat Mills maker of the Aussie Icon Akubra Hats.

In 1972, Dillingham Construction handed over Australian and South-East Asian contracts including Western Distributor (Sydney) and projects underway including the Melbourne Hilton Hotel to Mainline Corporation to manage.

In 1973, Michael Warson sells 51% of Glenvill to Mainline. Name changes to Glenvill Mainline Homes and opens branches in QLD & South Australia. At the time, the company was the second largest home builder in Australia.

In September 1973, Mainline Corporation performed a 1:5 premium share issue to raise $3,649,265.

In April 1974, many property developers were paying finance companies 15% for money. By May 1974, developers were paying finance companies 19% to 20% for call money. As the liquidity in the market tightened, land prices in Sydney fell 14%, including a 15% drop in Sydney's north shore house prices.

On 3 August 1974, Mainline Corporation reported a profit.

On 15 August 1974, Mainline Corporation's shares plunged by 40% on the back of rumors of a liquidity crisis. This resulted in a stock exchange inquiry.

On 20 August 1974 Mainline Corporation's principal creditor, the ANZ Bank, asked for a receiver to be appointed and Mainline was placed in voluntary administration and liquidated.

Mainline corporation Ltd appointed Mr J. H. Jamison as the receiver-manager to administer the more than $60 million owed to creditors.

Following the collapse of Mainline Corporation in August 1974, the Builders Labourers Federation (BLF) called for nationalisation of the building industry under workers control.

On the 16 April 1975, sixteen of Mainline Corporation's best properties (estimated at $86.8 million value) across Australia were sold by Sydney auctioneer F. R. Strange under the instruction of the receiver Mr J. H. Jamison to raise fund to pay creditors.

== Major construction projects ==
Mainline has built some of Australasia's landmark buildings, including the following major projects:

Completed	Project	Project Value	Location	Notes
1972	Lakeisde Hotel, Canberra		Canberra, Australian Capital Territory	
	AMP Centre		Sydney, New South Wales	
	Randwick Racecourse grandstand	$3 million	Sydney, New South Wales	
	15 Wylde Street, Potts Point		Sydney, New South Wales	
	Gold Fields House		Sydney, New South Wales	
	AMP Building, Sydney		Sydney, New South Wales	
	Gateway Plaza, 1 Macquarie Place		Sydney, New South Wales	
	Auckland Harbour Board Redevelopment (JV Dillingham Construction & Fletcher Construction)	$45 million	Auckland, New Zealand	
	10 - 20 Bond Street		Sydney, New South Wales	
	Nabalco bauxite project		At Gove, Arnhem Land	
	60 Carrington Street		Sydney, New South Wales	
	25 Bligh Street		Sydney, New South Wales	
	Sydney Adventist Hospital		Wahroonga, New South Wales	
1974	AMP Place, Brisbane, 10 Eagle Street		Brisbane, Queensland	
1977	Town Hall House	$18 million	Sydney, New South Wales	
1971	Collins Place, 45 Collins Street,	$270 million	Melbourne, Victoria	
	60 Martin Place		Sydney, New South Wales	
1964	Surfers Paradise Travelodge		Gold Coast, Queensland	
1966	The Sands		Gold Coast, Queensland	
1976	Law Courts Building, Sydney	$214 million	Sydney, New South Wales	
	Canberra Club (extensions)	$4.6 million	Canberra, Australian Capital Territory	
1973	Mainline Drive, Sacramento - Housing Estate		Sacramento, California	
1973	Discovery Bay Condominiums - Commercial & Residential Towers (JV with MEPC_plc)	$30 million	Honolulu, Hawaii	
1973	Squaw Valley Ski Resort	$25 plus million (USD)	Olympic Valley, California	
	The Warwick Resort (JV W.R. Carpenter Holdings Ltd (Walter Randolph Carpenter)		Fiji	Project Completed by Coral Surf Resorts

== Mainline Investments Pty Ltd ==
Mainline Investments Pty Ltd, was a wholly owned subsidiary of Mainline Corporation. Mainline Investments owned the following assets:

Year Purchased	Year Sold	Property / Investment	Location	Managed By	Notes
unknown	unknown	Macquarie Hotel	Port Macquarie, New South Wales	Noahs	
unknown	unknown	Royal Hotel-Motel	Port Macquarie, New South Wales	Noahs	
1970	unknown	Chevron's Surfers Paradise hotel	Gold Coast, Queensland	Noahs	
1971	unknown	Tower Mill motel	Wickham Terrace, Brisbane Queensland	Noahs	
1971	unknown	Holiday Inn	Potts Point, NSW	Noahs	

== Mainzeal ==
In 1968, Mainline Corporation Ltd established a branch in New Zealand to develop 7 acres (28,000 m^{2}) of harbour-front land in downtown Auckland, New Zealand.

In 1973, Mainline Corporation Ltd incorporated the company Mainline Corporation of New Zealand, a publicly listed New Zealand company. Mainline Corporation Ltd retained 49% shareholding in Mainline Corporation of New Zealand and the new company acquired all of Mainline's interests in New Zealand.

In 1975, Mainline Corporation of New Zealand adopted the name Mainzeal Corporation Ltd ("Mainzeal") following a restructure by Peter Menzies and Langer Avery.
