= 1 Macquarie Place =

Skyscraper in Sydney, Australia

Gateway Plaza
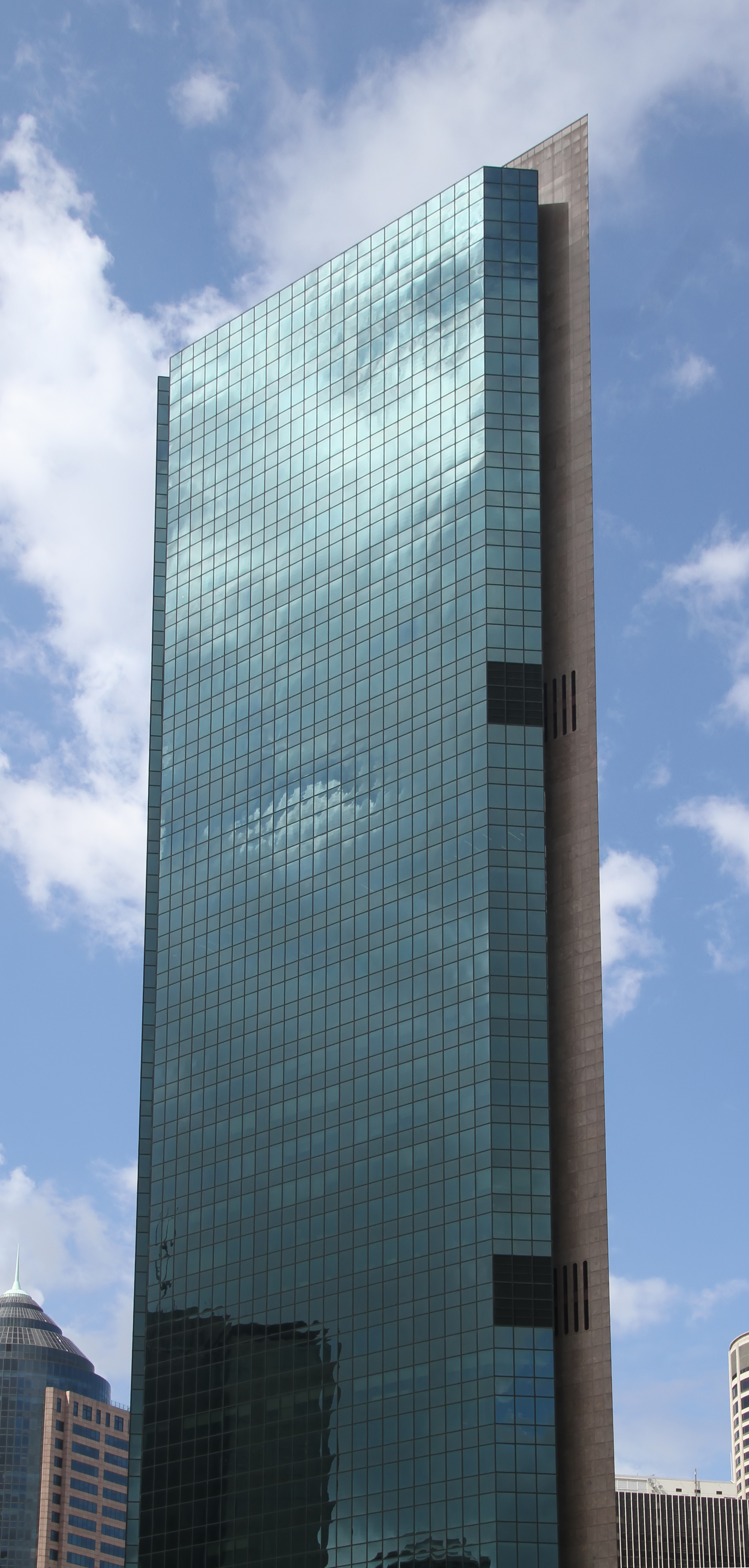
- Gateway Plaza

- Location within Australia

General information
- Status: Completed
- Type: Office
- Location: 1 Macquarie Place; Sydney, Australia
- Coordinates: 33.8621°S 151.2098°E
- Construction started: 1987
- Completed: 1990
- Opening: December 1990
- Cost: AUD$165,000,000
- Owner: Dexus

Height
- Architectural: 164 metres (538 ft)
- Roof: 157 metres (515 ft)

Technical details
- Floor count: 47 (3 below ground)
- Floor area: 44,000 square metres (470,000 sq ft)
- Lifts/elevators: 19 (16 passenger, 3 service)

Design and construction
- Architect: Peddle Thorp & Walker
- Developer: Kann Finch & Partners

Website
- www.gatewaytower.com.au

1 Macquarie Place (also known as Gateway Plaza) is a skyscraper in the Sydney central business district, located on Macquarie Place.

Designed by architect Peddle, Thorp & Walker, the blue glass-clad commercial office building reaches 46 storeys or 164 metres (538 ft) to the top of its spire, and it is very prominent on the Circular Quay waterfront. The tower contains about 470,000 square feet (44,000 m^{2}) of office space.

== History ==
In 1971, a proposal to redevelop an area in Circular Quay, Sydney was announced by a consortium of developers consisting of Hooker Corporation, Mainline Corporation and Dilingham Development Division (part of Silverton Transport and General Industries Ltd). The redevelopment project was dubbed by the consortium as Gateway Plaza. Although the project was initially proposed in 1971, construction did not begin until 1985 due to delays. Negotiations included retaining an old hotel on the site and redesigning the building as to not cast shadows on Macquarie Place Park.

The building services engineers during the construction phase were Norman Disney & Young and Lincoln Scott Australia.

The building was sold before completion in 1988 for $325 million to a subsidiary of National Mutual.

The British Consulate-General in Sydney is a tenant on the 16th floor.

The University of Wollongong Sydney Business School is a tenant on the 8th to 10th floors.

In 2018, Dexus engaged architectural firm Woods Bagot, engineers Taylor Thomson Whitting and builders Buildcorp to undertake a $30 million redevelopment and strengthening works of the Gateway Plaza building.
