= Circular Quay railway station =

Railway station in Sydney, New South Wales, Australia

Circular Quay
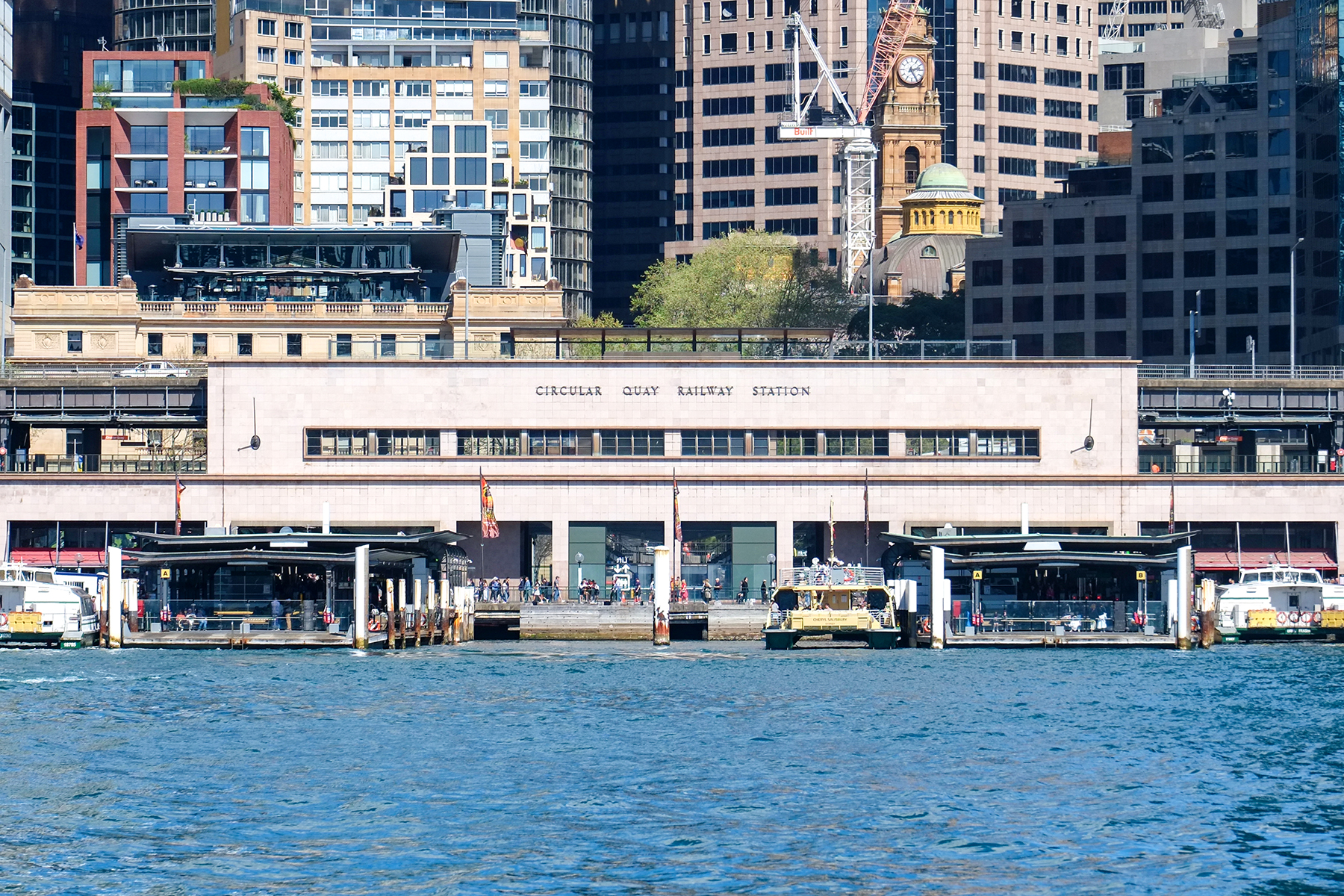
- Circular Quay railway station, looking south from Sydney Harbour, September 2023

General information
- Location: Alfred Street, Sydney, New South Wales, Australia
- Coordinates: 33°51′41″S 151°12′40″E
- Owner: Transport Asset Manager of New South Wales
- Operator: Sydney Trains
- Line: City Circle
- Distance: 2.6 km (1.6 mi) from Central
- Platforms: 2 side
- Tracks: 2
- Connections: Bus; Circular Quay; Circular Quay

Construction
- Structure type: Elevated
- Accessible: Yes
- Architect: John Bradfield (designer)
- Architectural style: Inter-War Functionalist

Other information
- Status: Staffed
- Station code: CQY

History
- Opened: 20 January 1956

Passengers
- 2025: 13,546,235 (year); 37,113 (daily) (Sydney Trains)
- Rank: 9

Services
Preceding station	Sydney Trains	Following station
Wynyard towards Parramatta or Leppington	Leppington & Inner West Line	St James as the Airport & South Line towards Macarthur
Wynyard towards Liverpool	Liverpool & Inner West Line clockwise only	St James towards City Circle
Wynyard as the Inner West & Leppington Line towards Parramatta or Leppington	Airport & South Line	St James towards Macarthur
City Circle route map
Location

Circular Quay railway station is a heritage-listed elevated railway station that is located on the City Circle line, serving the Circular Quay precinct of the Sydney central business district in New South Wales, Australia. It is served by Sydney Trains' T2 Leppington & Inner West Line, T3 Liverpool & Inner West Line and T8 Airport & South Line services.

It is adjacent to the Circular Quay ferry wharf complex, which serves as an interchange to Sydney Ferries. It is also adjacent to Circular Quay light rail station which is the terminus of the L2 Randwick Line and L3 Kingsford Line of Sydney's light rail network.

== History ==
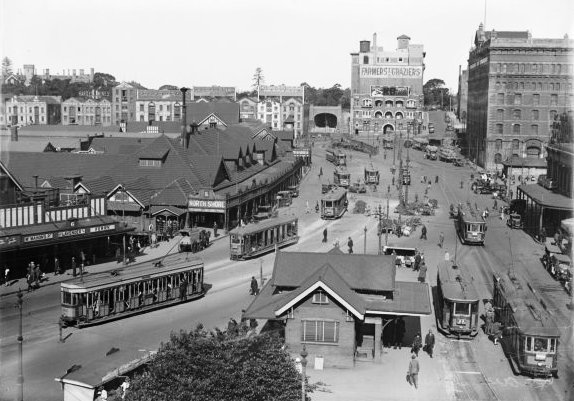
Eastbound view along Alfred Street, the future location of the Circular Quay station, before the construction of the rail viaduct with the ferry wharves on the left

Circular Quay is an area of historical significance for Sydney, as it was for a long time the central harbour of a settlement which relied on shipping for its connection to the outside world. By the 20th century, ferry commuter wharves began to eclipse commercial shipping wharves as the dominant feature of the Quay area. The area became a transport hub as it served as the terminus of both ferry and tram services.

Planning for a railway station here to complement this transport hub began in 1909, and work was authorised in 1915. Tunnels to link the surrounding stations to the future Circular Quay station were built from Central between 1917 and 1926 to St James (eastern section) and 1932 to Wynyard (western section). Work on the section of the railway through Circular Quay began in 1936, was interrupted by World War II, and recommenced in 1945. Work was again interrupted between 1951 and 1953 with the viaduct finally completed in 1954. The supporting beams were fabricated at Chullora Railway Workshops in the 1930s. They were used during the construction of the Hawkesbury River Railway Bridge in the 1940s, before being returned to Chullora.

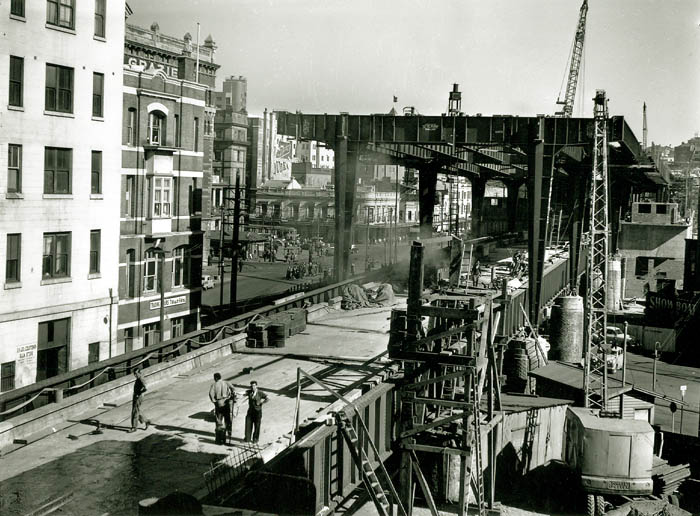
Circular Quay railway station and the Cahill Expressway under construction in 1955. Workmen can be seen standing on the viaduct leading into and through the station, which was completed the previous year in 1954.

Designs for the station building itself commenced in 1927, revised in 1937, and the station was finally completed and opened on 20 January 1956 by State Premier Joseph Cahill, with the first regular train services beginning on 22 January. The completion of Circular Quay station marked the completion of the City Circle railway as originally envisaged by John Bradfield making it the newest station on the line.

The construction and placement of the station was always controversial due to its prominent location at the head of Circular Quay, an important natural and cultural landmark and visitors' attraction. When the Cahill Expressway opened above the station in 1958, the controversy over the entire structure only intensified. There have been various proposals to relocate the station underground in conjunction with the demolition of the Cahill Expressway, however these have not come to fruition.

Along with Central station, Circular Quay received one of the first easy access upgrades which included lift access prior to September 1998.

In 2006, RailCorp performed maintenance and cleaning of the station's 50-year-old facade. A refurbishment in 2007 introduced sun-shading awnings on the platforms, removed advertising hoarding between the tracks, and improved facilities on the concourse level.

== Design ==
Circular Quay station features a ground-level central concourse, and elevated platforms on a second level. Both platforms feature sections of open galleries, offering views to Circular Quay, the Sydney Harbour Bridge and the Sydney Opera House on one side, and Customs House and the Alfred Street plaza on the other. Viaducts lead from the elevated platforms to tunnels through surrounding elevated terrain that lead to neighbouring stations.

The station has two main, double-storey facades, facing Circular Quay to the north, and Customs House to the south respectively. The northern facade is faced with polished granite tiles, while the southern one features polished granite and sandstone. The station name is featured in steel lettering on both sides. The upper storey of the facades correspond to the central sections of the platforms, and feature steel-framed windows. The exterior of the remainder of the platform feature open, glass-railed galleries, supported on the lower level by a continuation of the central facade. The top of the northern, harbour-facing facade is incorporated into the viewing platform and rest area located above the station alongside the Cahill Expressway roadway. This platform can be reached from the pedestrian walkway on the Cahill Expressway.

The station platforms are reached from the ground level concourse via stairs, escalators and lifts. The central concourse is surrounded on either side by retail and food shops and public toilets located under the elevated platforms. The concourse is decorated with brass details in an aquatic animal motif, seen in sculpted grills above stairways and doorways. Glass bricks are used extensively in various parts.

The station is in an inter-war functionalist style, as seen in the strong horizontal lines presented by the windows and galleries, with art deco details.

== Platforms and services ==
Platform	Line	Stopping pattern	Notes
1	T2	services to Homebush, Parramatta, Leppington	
1	T3	services to Liverpool via Lidcombe and Regents Park	
2	T8	services to Sydenham services to Revesby & Macarthur via Airport stations 2 weekday evening services to Campbelltown	

== Transport links ==
South-east of the railway station is the Alfred Street bus terminus. A number of Transdev John Holland routes originate from there while two Big Bus Tours routes depart from George Street just north of Alfred Street.

Adjacent to the station to the north lies Circular Quay wharf that is served by Captain Cook Cruises, Manly Fast Ferry and Sydney Ferries services.

West of the bus terminus and also at Alfred Street is the Circular Quay light rail stop, which is the northern terminus for the L2 Randwick and L3 Kingsford lines.

== Gallery ==
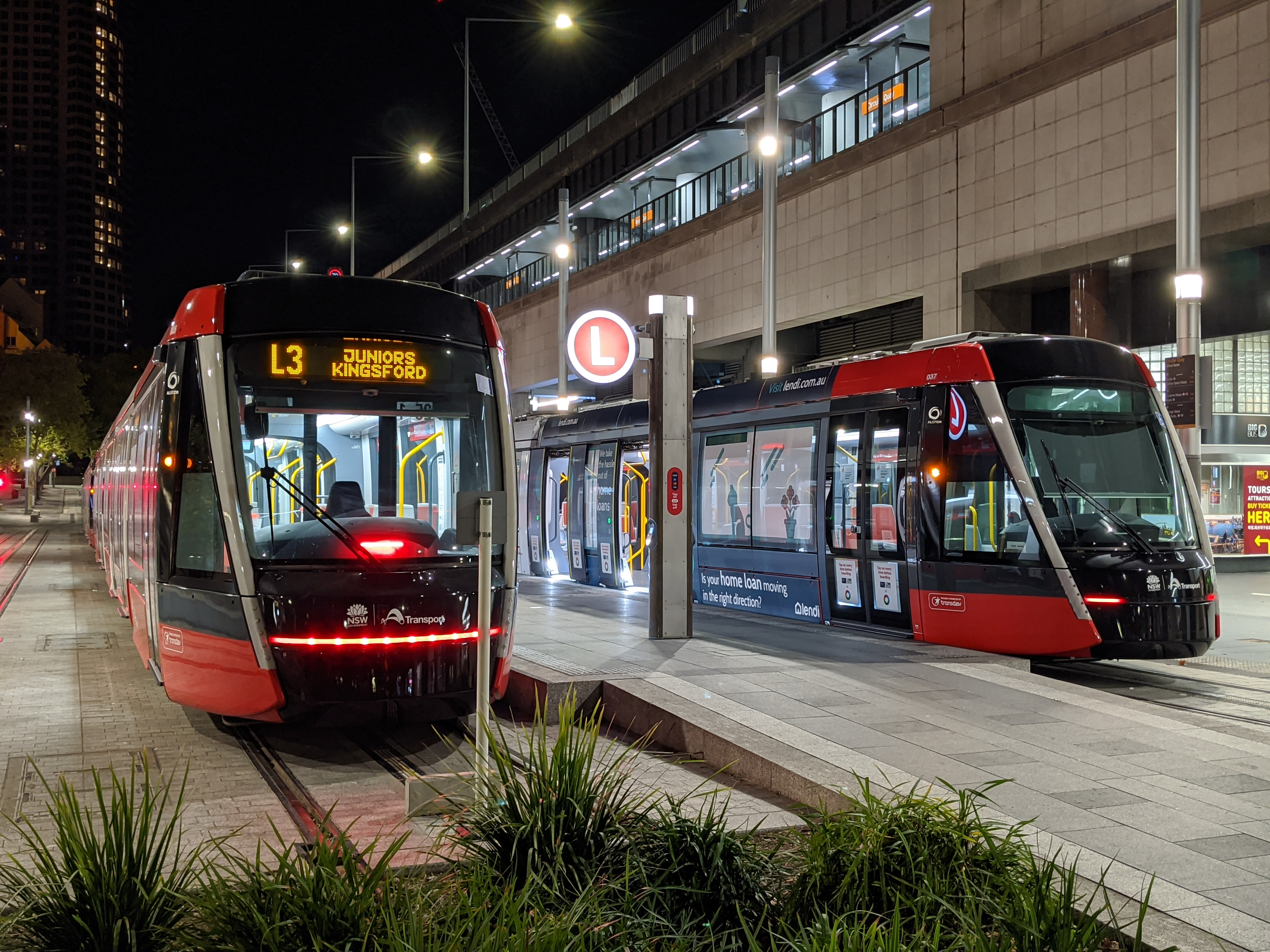
Connecting trams outside Circular Quay Station, May 2020

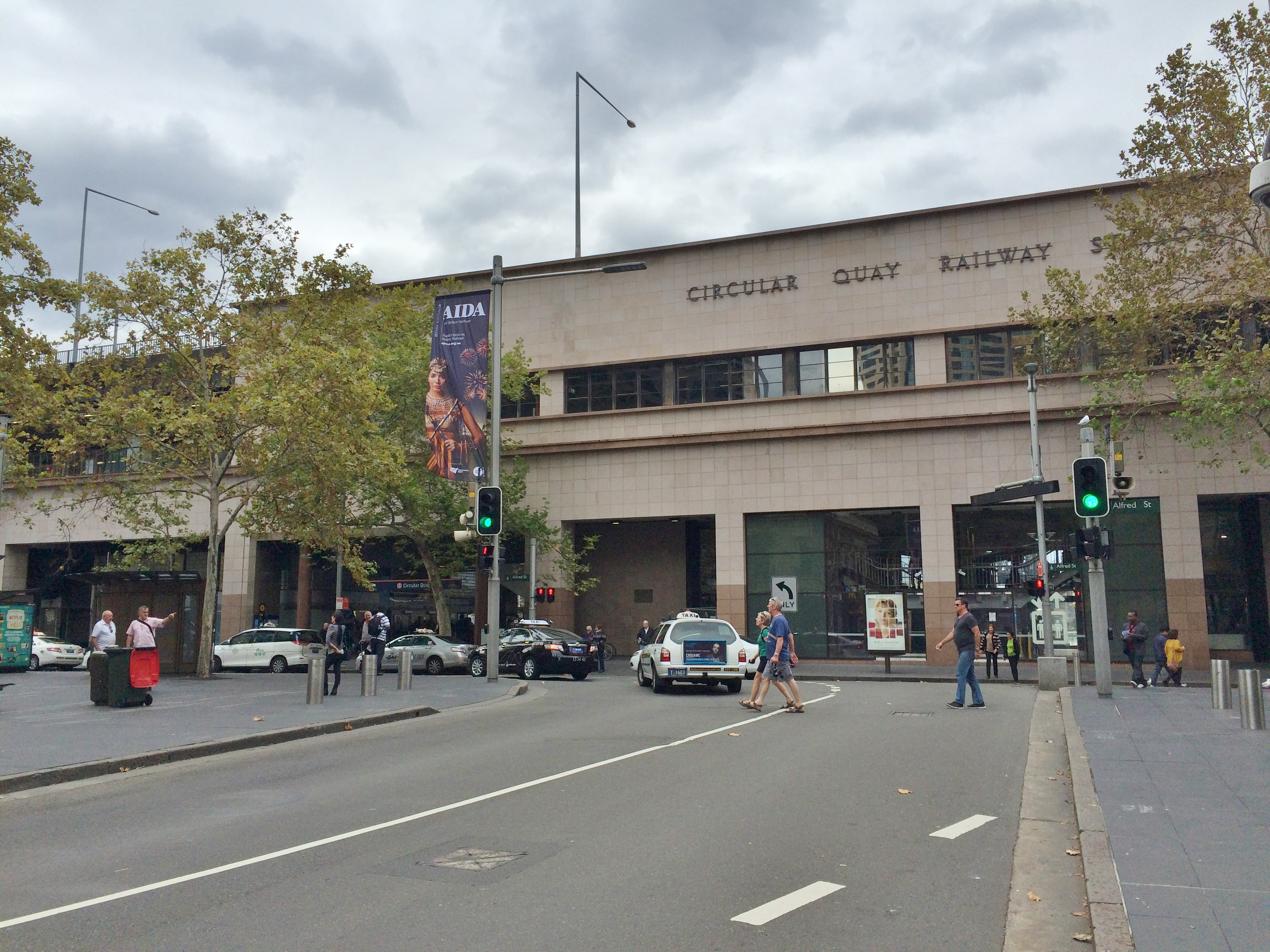
Northern exterior view from Alfred Street,
April 2015

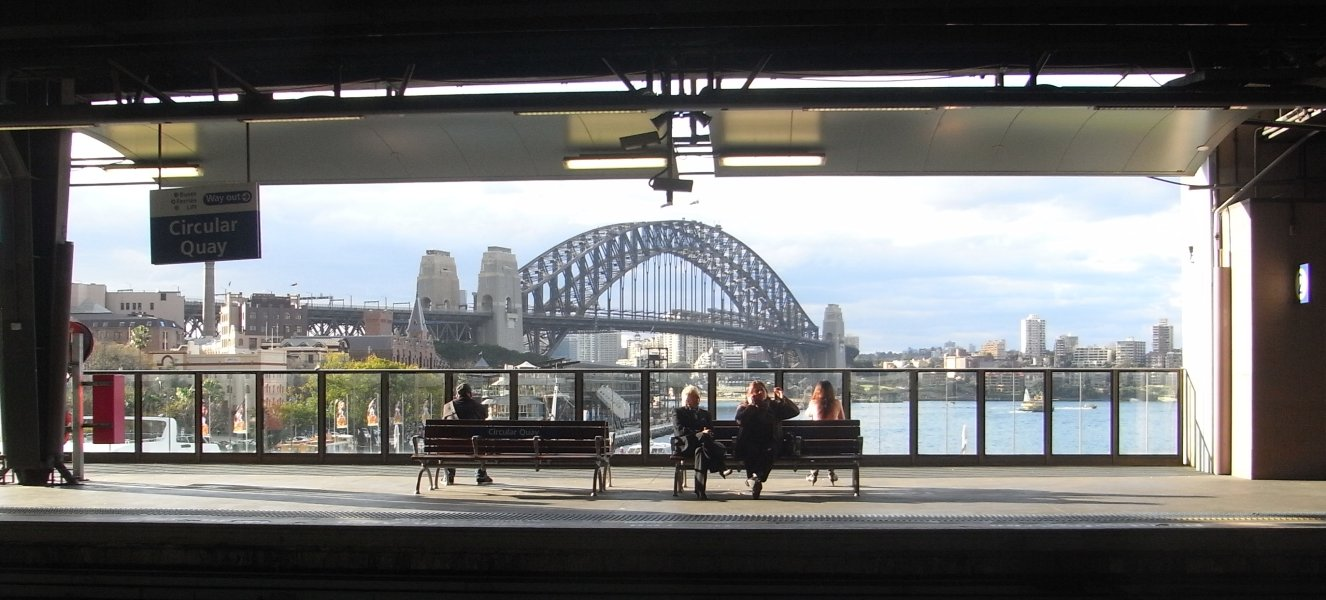
Northbound view from Platform 1 viewing Sydney Harbour Bridge, August 2007

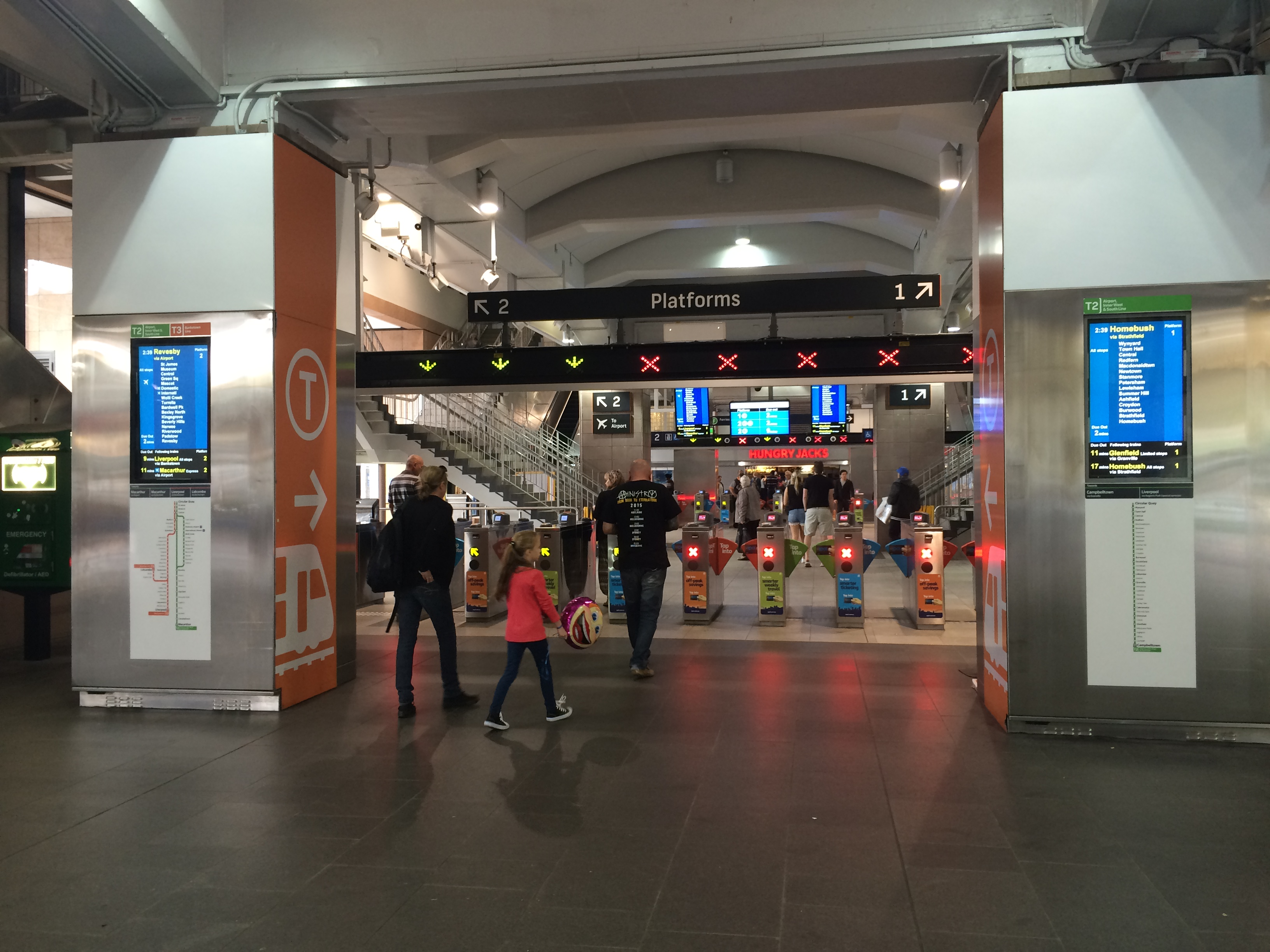
Entrance to ground level concourse, April 2015

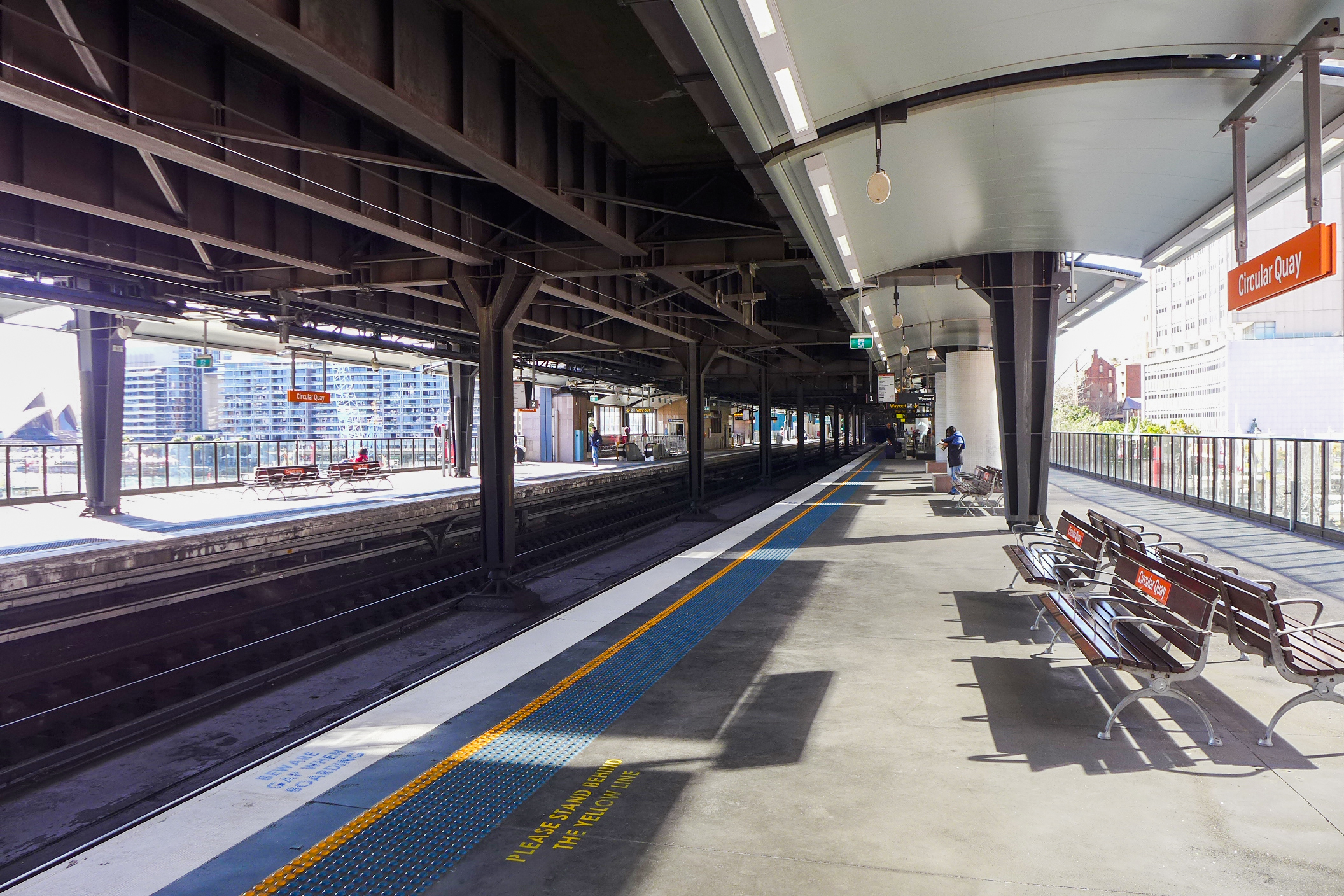
Eastbound view from Platform 2, August 2017

== See also ==
- List of Sydney railway stations
- Railways in Sydney
- Rail transport in New South Wales
