= Town Hall House =

Office block in Sydney

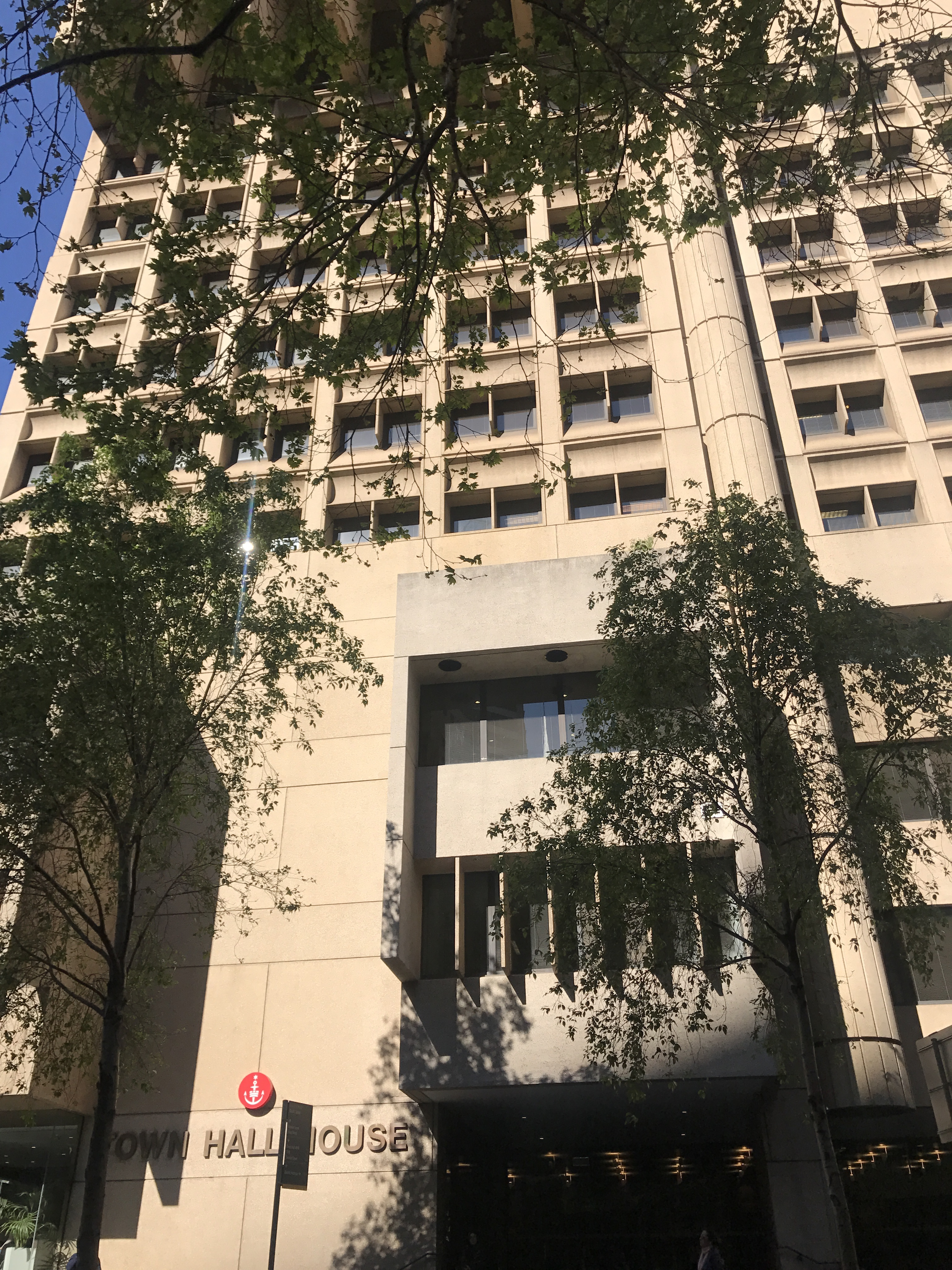
Town Hall House, Sydney at 456 Kent Street

Town Hall House is a heritage-listed office block in the city of Sydney, the capital of New South Wales, Australia. It is located at 456 Kent Street, Sydney, at the back of Sydney Town Hall. It is also an official building of City of Sydney Council and the service centre of Town Hall.

Town Hall House is famous for its Brutalist architectural style. The building is an important example of Brutalism, which refers to the Modern Movement design.

== History ==
The land on which Town Hall House was built originally belonged to Francis Lascelles Wallace, according to 1833 survey plans map of Sydney. It was still a private building at the back of Old Burial Grounds (the area of Sydney Town Hall today), as shown of the map of 1855 Sydney. On the 1880 planning map of Sydney, this area (454 - 456 Kent Street) had changed to Goulburn Hotel and the old burial grounds lay next to Sydney Town Hall. The location was chosen to be a power station to supply electricity by Major Cardew, a famous trade expert, on March 22, 1900. From 1949, the land was used for the Simmonds Building and Council offices. At that time, council staffs were distributed in various offices across the city, which led to inconvenience with the increasing demand of council services. The new building was built by Mainline Corporation at a cost of $18 million with construction completed in 1977 and allowed all council staff to work together. Town Hall House is a reconstructed building based on the original architecture, and replaced an old building housing Sydney County Council's Electricity Department and a sales showroom on Druitt Street (the side entrance of Town Hall House).

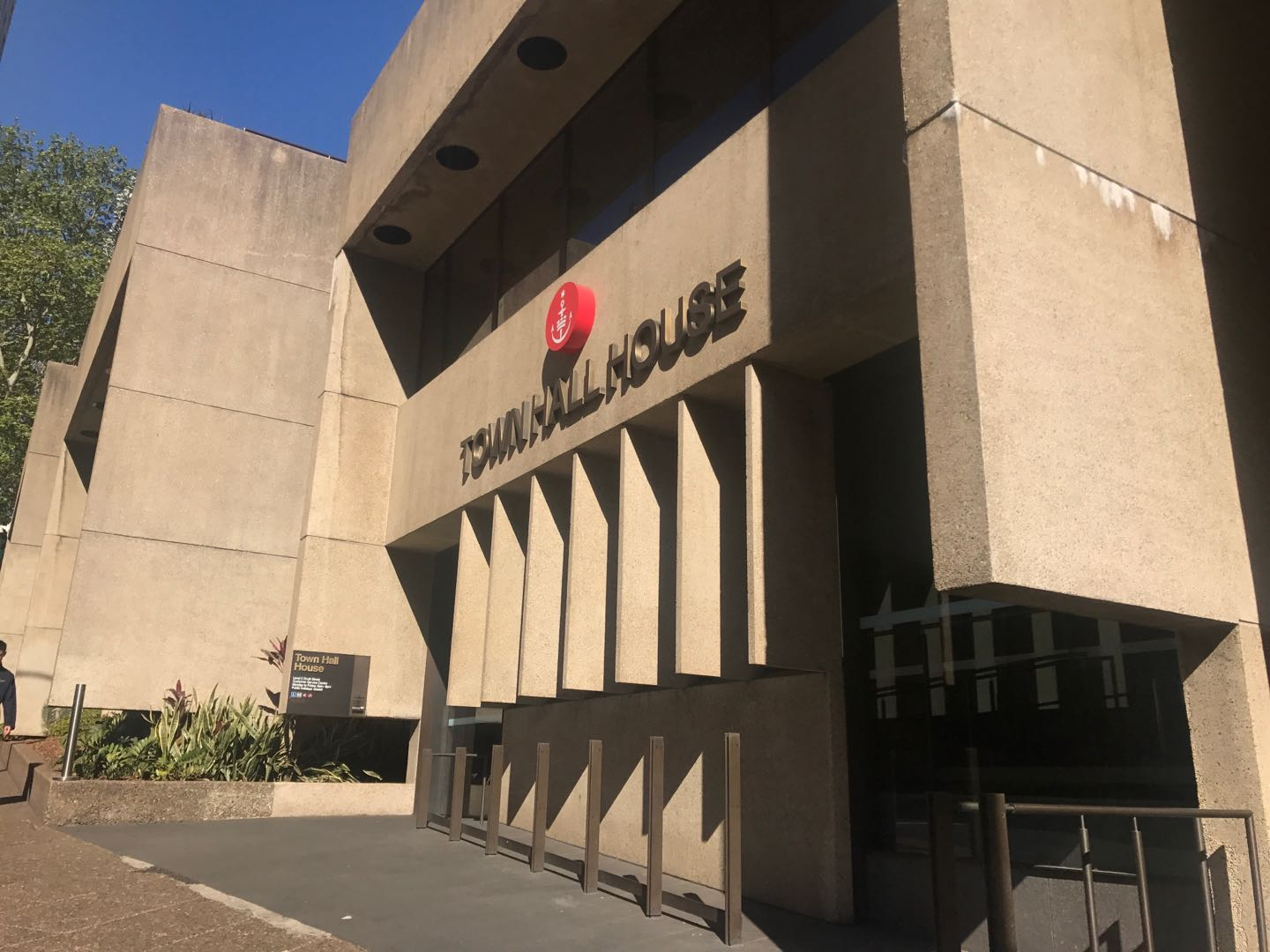
Side entrance at Druitt Street

== Architecture ==
Town Hall House was designed by Ken Woolley of the firm Ancher, Mortlock and Woolley, rebuilt and opened and on 28 June 1977 for City of Sydney Council. It is constructed using concrete with little decoration, which matches to its Brutalist style, and is an example of early 70s Brutalism. The Heritage Council of New South Wales said that Town Hall House is an example of the most important architecture from the modernist architectural movement in the 20th century. The angular geometry of Town Hall House is an element of this style of architecture. In terms of structure, Town Hall House is connected to the Sydney Town Hall by a passage. The two buildings form a contrast between the architectural styles of the 19th and 20th centuries. In addition, the buildings were constructed using different materials—concrete for Town Hall House and sandstone for the town hall.) Town Hall House is 100 m (330 ft) tall, with 25 levels. The building has developed into a combination of official area and leisure space. It provides a cafe and display area in the public space. There is a library express on the first level.

Cameron Logan, who is director of heritage conservation in the Faculty of Architecture, Design, and Planning at the University of Sydney, feels although some people view modernist architecture as "an attack on the civic decorum of the city" or "just plain ugly", it has gained greater acceptance. "I think what is fundamentally important, and has often been missed, is that many buildings of this period had a strong civic intent and presence, and Town Hall House is an excellent example." He added: "We need to reimagine or redefine our past in terms of city-making, it can't be a dead letter, fixed idea." The main special characters of the original architecture were kept. An example is a curved stairway between the first two floors restored to its original Brutalist sculptural form, with the detailed brass and stone.

=== Interior ===
The interior of the public areas of Town Hall House was refurbished by Smart Design Studio in 2015 with recommendations from Ken Woolley, the building's architect. Another company, Built, also completed the refurbishment of Town Hall House in 2015, including Levels 1, 2, 3, and the roof. The interior fit out of the building meets NABERS (National Australian Built Environment Rating System) and Green Star ratings level. The building is a combination of historic elements and modern design. The exterior of the building kept the Brutalist style, but modern design is used within the building. Briefly, there are lifts straight after accessing the main gate. On the left side, there is a cafe, library and a side entrance. There are also tender boxes and a concierge on the ground floor to assist people in booking tours and providing several basic services for the building occupants. In addition, City Council is on the second floor. There are several other functional areas including the Town Hall Customer Service Centre (Level 2) and City Model Room and Meeting Rooms (Level 4).

Sydney Town Hall customer service is located on the 2nd level of the building. The City Model Room is a model-sized display of the city of Sydney on the 2nd level of Town Hall House. The city model was arranged according to the buildings' actual positions. The model was built initially in the 1980s but is upgraded continuously to reflect the changes with developments in the city. The model gives people a direct view of what the city looks like and shows its development over the past three decades. It assists with planning and designing for the future, which is one of the roles of City of Sydney Council. There are two meeting rooms on Level 4, the Marconi Room and the southern Function Room. The rooms are connected to Sydney Town Hall by a glass passage to Marconi Terrace. It is the link between Sydney Town Hall and Town Hall House. In the terrace, there is a large stainless steel and glass sculpture designed by Mike Kitching installed in 1976. It shows the development of the radio industry and is a commemoration of the centenary of Guglielmo Marconi's birth. The sculpture connects the radio transmitter, mast, and wave to a Morse Code transmitter and receiver.

== Occupants ==
=== City of Sydney ===
Town Hall House, Sydney is the main administrative center for the City of Sydney. In this building, City of Sydney Council functions include local area development, local services to citizens and tourists, benefits for the local community, city events and so on. The council is responsible for city development, including developing resources, providing infrastructure, attracting visitors, protecting the environment, and overall control of the city plan. There are recommendation meetings at least 10 times a year, and members of the public are allowed to attend under Council guidelines. The Sydney Town Hall Customer Service Centre is open from 8:00 am to 6:00 pm, Monday to Friday. It is closed on public holidays. The services provided in Town Hall House by the City of Sydney Council can be divided into three categories—daily life, city plans, and legal services. In terms of daily life, citizens can apply for parking and street parade permits, book a pick-up for white goods and furniture, and drop off batteries, bulbs, etc. for recycling. For city plans, council approves proposed development applications. Citizens can report graffiti. It issues crane and hoarding permits. Citizens can make appointments with city planner and view public development applications. Citizens also can get copies of Council reports. They can arrange for a Justice of the Peace to witness a statutory declaration of certify documents.

==== What's On ====
What's On is the official events manager for the City of Sydney, and provides locals and tourists with details of public/private events in the Sydney region on any given day. The offices for What's On are located in Town Hall House. The offices post the events schedule on their webpage.

=== Library Express ===
Library Express is located at the side entrance of the building on Druitt Street. The library service provides equipment, WiFi, public access computers, a reading area and a lounge. There are 500,000 items in Sydney library branches that can be picked up from or returned at the library express no matter which branch they were borrowed from. The collections contain books, newspapers and magazines. There is no staff here.

The detailed design of lighting, walls, and furniture creates a comfortable environment. The design is by Melocco & Moore, which had a commission to fit up Level One of the building.

=== Inner metropolitan regional organisation of councils ===
The Inner Metropolitan Regional Organisation of Councils (IMROC) was a voluntary organisation to promote the relationship between the councils of the inner city. However, with the development of the city, six regional organisations within the metropolitan area replaced IMROC.

=== Others ===
Most of the offices above the fourth floor are leased to individual firms.
