= Dexus =

Australasian real asset manager

- Formerly: Deutsche Office Trust; Deutsche Industrial Trust; Deutsche Diversified Trust
- Type: Public
- Traded as: ASX: DXS
- Industry: Commercial property
- Founded: 1984
- Founder: Deutsche Bank
- Headquarters: Quay Quarter Tower, Sydney, Australia
- Key people: Warwick Negus (Chairman); Ross Du Vernet (CEO)
- Revenue: $936 million (2023)
- Number of employees: 1,079 (2023)
- Website: www.dexus.com

Dexus is an Australasian real assets manager and owner. Founded in 1984, it is listed on the Australian Securities Exchange.

== History ==
Dexus was listed by Deutsche Bank on the Australian Securities Exchange in 1984 as the Deutsche Diversified Trust, followed by the Deutsche Industrial Trust in 1984 and the Deutsche Office Trust in 1998.

In 2004, all three were stapled to form the DB Rreef Trust. In 2008 it was rebranded as the Dexus Property Group after purchasing Deutsche Bank's remaining 50% shareholding. On 27 March 2017, the company was rebranded to Dexus.

In April 2022, Dexus purchased AMP Capital's real estate and domestic infrastructure equity business.

== Notable properties ==
=== Current ===
- Australia Square (50%)
- Macquarie Centre (25%)
- Nauru House (75%)
- Pacific Fair (20%)
- Westfield Miranda (50%)
- Westfield Warringah Mall (50%)
- 1 Bligh Street (37%)
- 1 Macquarie Place
- 25 Martin Place
- 123 Albert Street
- 480 Queen Street

=== Former ===
- AMP Place, Brisbane
- Grosvenor Place (50%)
- King George Central
- Westfield Whitford City (50%)
