= AMP Place, Brisbane =

Skyscraper in Brisbane, Queensland

AMP Centre
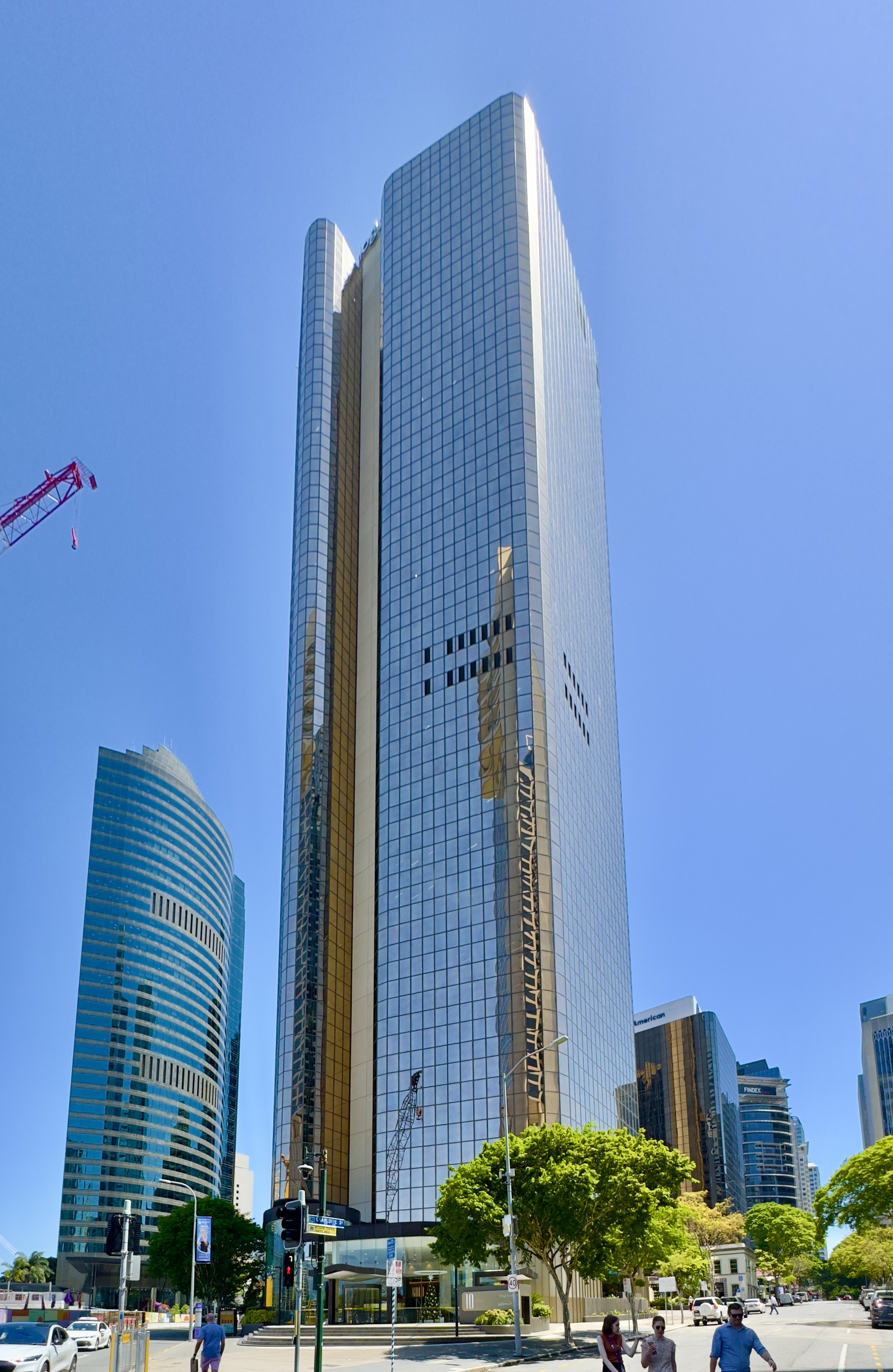
- AMP Place
- Interactive map of the AMP Centre area

General information
- Status: Completed
- Type: Office
- Location: 10 Eagle Street, Brisbane, Australia
- Coordinates: 27°28′9.50″S 153°1′47.50″E
- Opening: 1978
- Owner: Marquette

Height
- Roof: 135 m (443 ft)

Technical details
- Floor count: 35

Design and construction
- Architect: Peddle Thorp & Walker

Gold Tower, originally named the AMP Centre and also known by its address of 10 Eagle Street, is a gold-coloured skyscraper located in the heart of the Brisbane central business district in Queensland, Australia. It was one of the first glass-clad buildings to be constructed in the city centre. Its colour may lend its name to the surrounding area, known colloquially as the Golden Triangle, which is the city’s main financial precinct.

When the skyscraper was completed in 1978, it was Brisbane's tallest building. It consists of 35 floors and is 135 m (443 ft) high. The architects were Peddle Thorp & Walker.

In April 2021, CPP Investment Board and Dexus sold the building to Marquette.

== See also ==
- List of tallest buildings in Brisbane
