= Mainzeal =

Mainzeal Property & Construction
- Type: Private company
- Industry: Construction
- Founded: 1968
- Headquarters: Auckland, New Zealand
- Area served: New Zealand
- Services: Construction
- Number of employees: 500
- Parent: Richina Global Real Estate
- Divisions: Construction, Interiors, Project Definition, Infrastructure, Facilities Management, Living
- Website: www.mainzeal.com

Mainzeal Property and Construction Ltd was one of the largest New Zealand property and construction companies until being placed into receivership on 6 February 2013 and then being placed into liquidation on 28 February 2013. According to its website, Mainzeal was involved in delivering $7.5 billion of construction projects across New Zealand. It was held by Richina Global Real Estate, which is part of Richina Inc, an independent and closely held New Zealand-headquartered Asia Pacific holding company.

== History ==
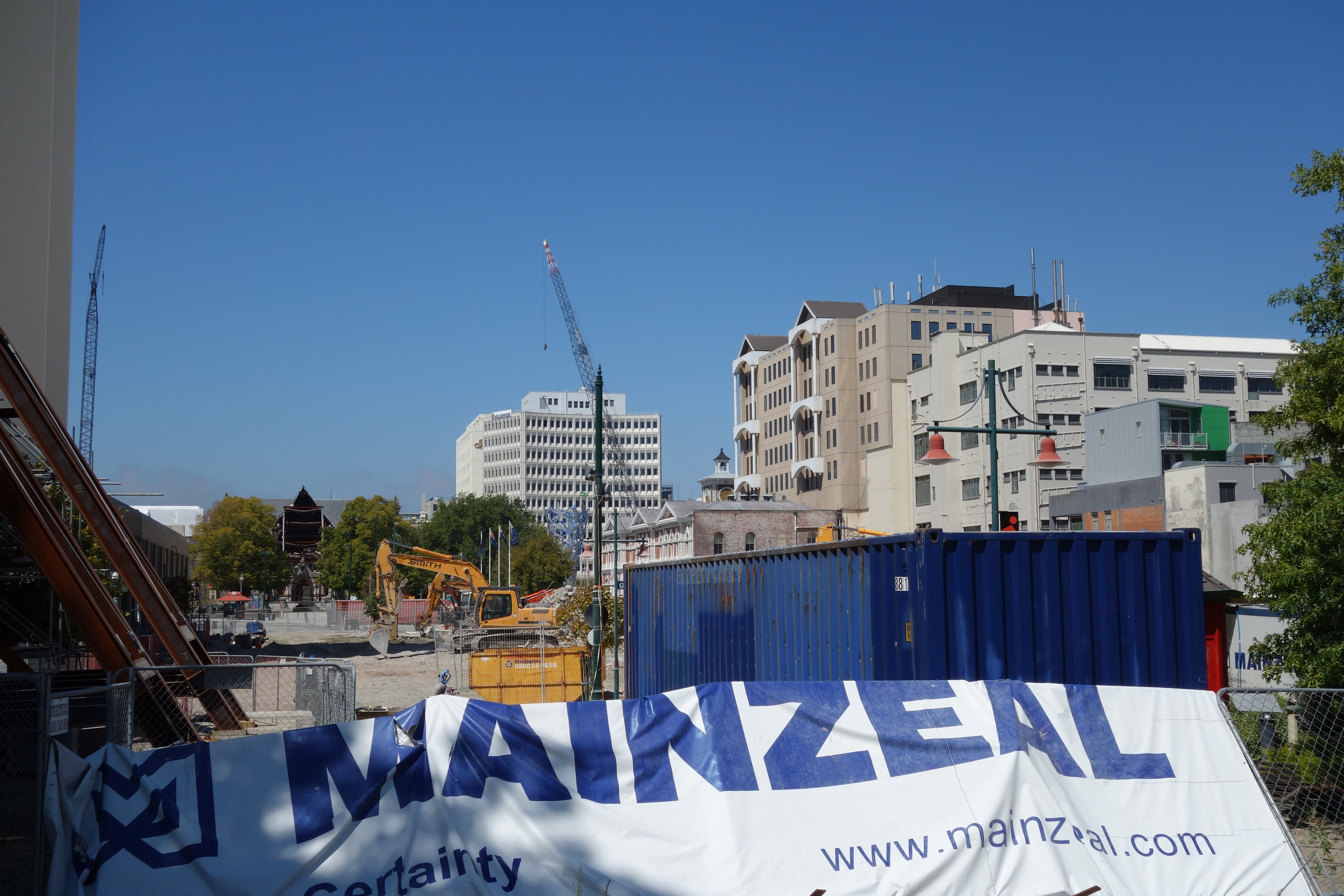
Mainzeal managed the demolition of the Clarendon Tower in Christchurch

It was founded in 1968 as a branch of Mainline Corporation, an Australian company, to develop 7 acres (28,000 m^{2}) of harbour-front land in the Auckland CBD as part of Mainline-Dillingham-Fletcher. Mainline Contractors Pty Ltd was established from this base and in 1969, became Mainline Corporation of New Zealand, a publicly listed New Zealand company, adopting the name Mainzeal Corporation Ltd in 1975 following a restructure by Peter Menzies and Langer Avery.

The Richina holding company was created when Mainzeal acquired a New Zealand leather business (since sold) and in 1996 it changed its name to Richina Pacific (retaining the Mainzeal name for its construction unit) and started investing in China, where its owners saw major business opportunities. Richina Pacific delisted from NZX in January 2009.

In 2006 Mainzeal experienced some financial setbacks, posting large losses associated mainly with the Scene One, Scene Two and Scene Three apartment developments in the Auckland CBD and the nearby 12,200-seat Vector Arena in Quay Park. The losses on these projects were recovered, with Mainzeal's pre-tax earnings reaching US$1.6 million surplus compared to US$2.8 million loss in the previous year.

Following the Christchurch earthquake, 2010 Vero appointed the MWH Mainzeal joint venture as their preferred partner in their efforts to rebuild Canterbury. In 2011 Mainzeal expanded its services to include facilities management and entered the residential market with a division called Mainzeal Living.

On 6 February 2013 Mainzeal Property and Construction went into receivership, leaving workers and subcontractors locked out of worksites. On 13 February 2013 receivers took control of Vic 200 Ltd, the company that owns Mainzeal's head office building in central Auckland. In the same week another Richina owned company, King Facade Ltd, went into voluntary liquidation. On 28 February 2013 Mainzeal Property & Construction Ltd and other companies in the group were placed into liquidation – making a total of twelve companies in liquidation. The companies now under the control of the liquidators were: Mainzeal Group, Mainzeal Property and Construction, Mainzeal Living, 200 Vic, Building Futures Group Holding, Building Futures Group, Mainzeal Residential, Mainzeal Construction, Mainzeal, Mainzeal Construction SI, MPC NZ, RGRE. By 9 April, the company had only 14 full-time staff left, down from 500.

In 2019, the High Court of New Zealand ordered Mainzeal's former directors to pay NZ$36 million in penalties for breaching directors' duties and carrying on in a manner likely to create a substantial risk of serious loss to creditors. In March 2021 this order was overturned by the Court of Appeal, which found that although the directors had breached their duties, this had not caused any actual loss to creditors. However, the Court found that the directors had breached other duties by entering into obligations while insolvent. The Court sent the matter back to the High Court to reach a decision on the total amount of liability, as it did not have enough information to assess the amount owing. An appeal to the Supreme Court (which Mainzeal built) resulted in a ruling in August 2023 that the directors were liable for $36m in damages.

== Major projects ==
- Fisher & Paykel Healthcare building 3
- Lion Nathan Integrated Beverage Facility
- Rotorua Hospital Upgrade
- Ohakea MSS Building
- Wellington ASB Sports Centre
- NZ HVDC Inter-Island Pole 3 Project Haywards and Benmore
- Supreme Court of New Zealand
