= QT Canberra =

Hotel in Canberra, Australia

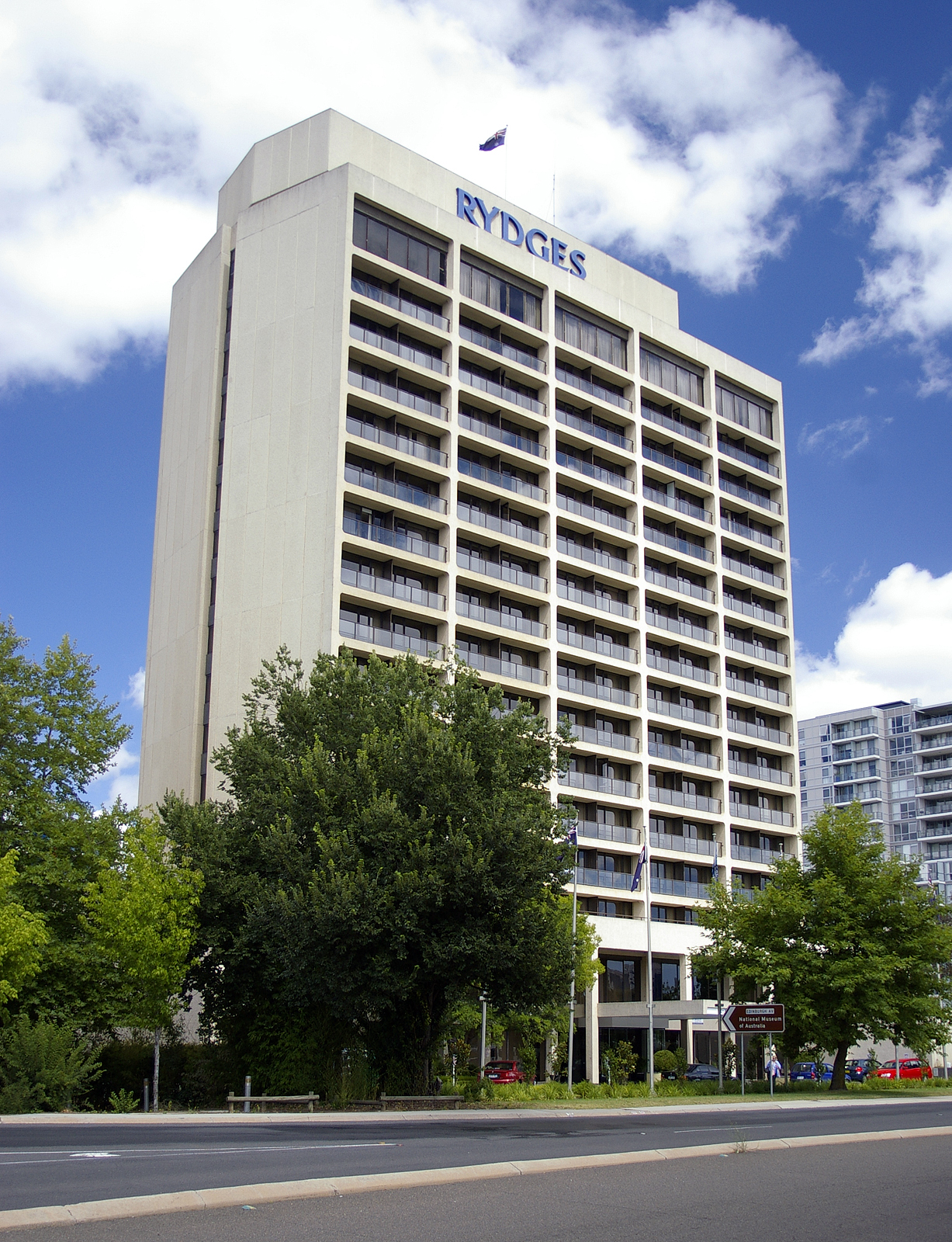
- Rydges Lakeside in January 2009
- Interactive map of the QT Canberra area

General information
- Type: Hotel
- Location: London Circuit, Canberra, Australia
- Coordinates: 35°17′1″S 149°7′32″E
- Opened: 22 November 1972
- Owner: QT Hotels & Resorts

Technical details
- Floor count: 18

Design and construction
- Architecture firm: Peddle, Thorp & Walker
- Main contractor: Mainline

Website
- www.qthotels.com

QT Canberra is a hotel in Canberra, Australia.

Construction began on the 215 room Lakeside Hotel at 1 London Circuit in 1970. Designed by Peddle, Thorp & Walker, it was built by Mainline Corporation. It opened on 22 November 1972.

The Lakeside Hotel was rebranded as Rydges Lakeside in 1995 having become part of the Rydges Hotels & Resorts chain in 1980. It was branded as QT Canberra in 2014 after becoming part of QT Hotels & Resorts.
