= PTW Architects =

Australian architecture firm headquartered in Sydney

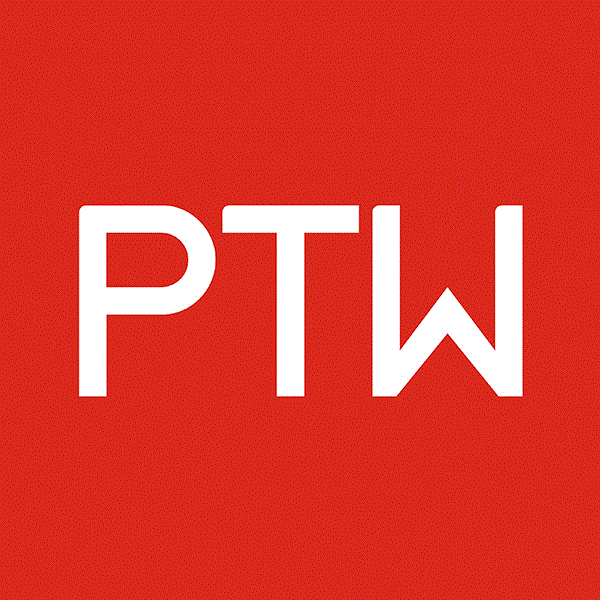
- Type: Subsidiary
- Industry: Architecture
- Founded: 1889 in Sydney
- Founder: James Peddle; Samuel George Thorp; H. Ernest Walker
- Headquarters: Sydney, Australia; with offices in Beijing, Shanghai, Ho Chi Minh City, Hanoi
- Owner: China Construction Design International
- Website: ptw.com.au

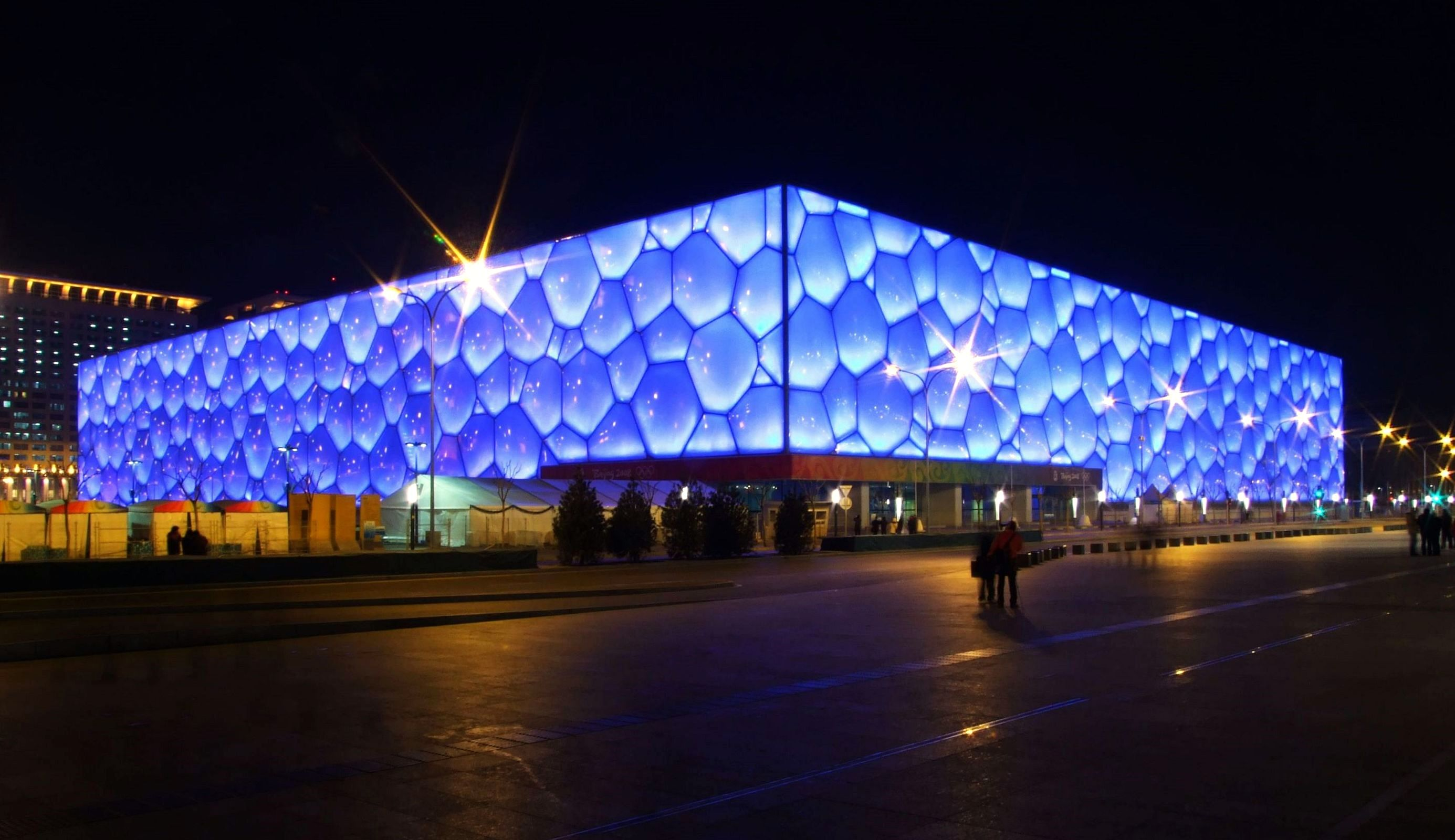
The National Aquatics Center in Beijing

PTW Architects is an Australian architecture firm founded in Sydney in 1889. In 2013, PTW was acquired by the Chinese architecture and engineering consulting firm China Construction Design International (CCDI).

PTW is a diverse architectural practice with its designers specializing in a broad range of sectors including residential/mixed use, infrastructure, aged care, the arts (education/culture) and sport. The firm is known for its collaboration and partnerships with other architectural firms and specialist consultants.

== History ==
PTW Architects (formerly Peddle Thorp & Walker) was established in Sydney by James Peddle in 1889. Peddle was notable in the domestic field, adapting the practice of architecture he learned in England and the United States to the Sydney climate and conditions. Samuel George Thorp was made a partner of the firm soon after his award-winning entry for Sydney's first planned garden suburb, Daceyville, in 1912. In 1924, H. Ernest Walker joined as the third partner bringing an interest in efficiency and technology developed while working for major American firms in the 1920s. Henceforth, the firm was known as Peddle Thorp & Walker and the office began to diversify from a purely domestic practice to one that also excelled at commercial and industrial architecture.

During the Second World War, PTW continued to practice with numerous defence projects awarded to it by the Commonwealth Department of Works. In the mid-1950s, the massive growth of Australia's built environment saw PTW grow under the leadership of the late Graham Thorp to dominate the commercial building market, for which it is still renowned. The 120-metre (390 ft)-high AMP Tower at Circular Quay, built in Sydney in 1962, was the first office building to break the 50-metre (160 ft)-height limit imposed in 1912. It was not only a physical landmark, but reached a standard of architectural refinement rare in such buildings at that time. Since then, PTW has been responsible for more than 50 commercial office buildings in Sydney and more than 150 throughout Australia, New Zealand and South-East Asia. PTW is also responsible for the bulk of the Sydney Harbour waterfront development opportunities, most recently with Rogers Stirk Harbour + Partners on the Barangaroo project.

Contributing to the firm's projects is the ability to create buildings where commercial objectives are balanced with cultural and public uses, leading to the enhancement of the public realm and a city's facilities. This can be seen in projects such as the Walsh Bay Redevelopment, Angel Place and City Recital Hall, the recently completed extension of the National Gallery of Australia, the Forum Development and East Circular Quay.

== Major architectural works ==
PTW Architects has designed some of Australasia's landmark buildings including the following major architectural projects:

Completed	Project name	Location	Award	Notes
1932	Science House	157–169 Gloucester Street and Essex Street, The Rocks, Sydney	Inaugural winner of the Sir John Sulman Medal 1932	
1952	Royal Swedish Legation	5 Turrana Street, Yarralumla, Canberra	Sir John Sulman Medal 1952	
1962	AMP Building, Sydney	33 Alfred Street, Sydney	New South Wales Enduring Architecture Award, 2013	
1972	Lakeside Hotel, Canberra	Canberra, Australian Capital Territory		
1977	AMP Centre, Sydney	Sydney central business district		
1997 & 2010	National Gallery of Australia Extension	Canberra, Australian Capital Territory		
2007	Beijing National Aquatics Center (known as the Water Cube)	Beijing, China	LEAF Award (2007)	
	TEDA Waterfront Masterplan	Tianjin, China	Zhan Tian You Award, Winner (2005); Lu Ban Award, Winner (2005)	
	Calyx, Royal Botanical Gardens, Sydney			
1972: 1988 & 2010	AGNSW 21st Century John Kaldor Family Gallery	Art Gallery of New South Wales, Sydney	AIA Emil Sodersten Award for Interior Architecture (2012)	
	Walsh Bay, Sydney	Walsh Bay, Sydney		
	Revy, Sydney			
	One Central Park, Sydney	Broadway, Sydney		

== See also ==
- Architecture of Australia
