= Circular Quay =

Locality in New South Wales, Australia

- Sydney Cove
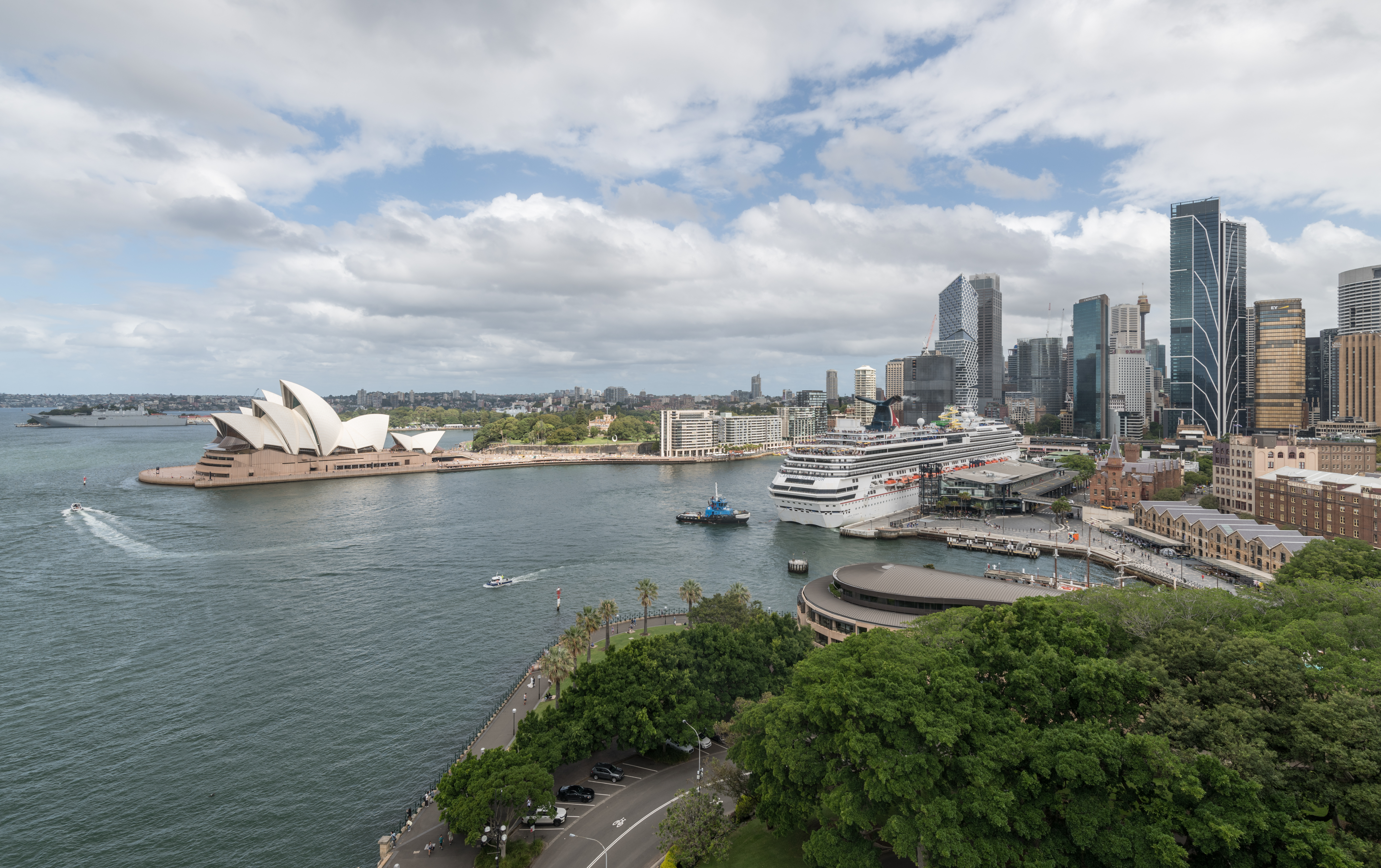
- Circular Quay from the Sydney Harbour Bridge

- Location within Sydney
- Part of: Port Jackson
- Type: Harbour/port; Public piazza and tourism precinct; Heritage area; Transport node: Overseas Passenger Terminal; Ferry wharf; Railway station; Bus interchange; Light rail; Electric tram (former)
- Owner: Property NSW
- Location: Sydney central business district, City of Sydney, New South Wales, Australia
- Coordinates: 33°51′40″S 151°12′40″E

Construction
- Construction start: 1837
- Completed: 1844

Other
- Known for: Sydney New Year's Eve

Circular Quay (/kiː/ kee) is a harbour, former shipping port and now passenger terminal, public piazza, heritage area and transport node in Sydney, New South Wales, Australia. It is located in Sydney Cove on the northern shoreline of the Sydney central business district, between Bennelong Point and The Rocks. It is part of the local government area of the City of Sydney.

Circular Quay is a major tourism precinct and consists of various promenades, boardwalks, parks, bars and restaurants. It also hosts a number of ferry wharves, bus interchanges, and a railway station. Often referred to as the "gateway to Sydney", the precinct has commanding views of the Sydney Harbour Bridge and Sydney Opera House, and is a popular location for viewing the Sydney New Year's Eve fireworks.

== History ==
=== Indigenous history ===
The Aboriginal name for Circular Quay is Warrung, meaning "little child".

The first people to occupy the area now known as Sydney were Aboriginal Australians. Radiocarbon dating suggests that they lived in and around Sydney for at least 30,000 years. In an archaeological dig in Parramatta, Western Sydney, it was found that the Aboriginals used charcoal, stone tools and possibly ancient campfires. Near Penrith, a far western suburb of Sydney, numerous Aboriginal stone tools were found in Cranebrook Terraces gravel sediments having dates of 45,000 to 50,000 years BP.

Prior to the arrival of the British there were 4,000 to 8,000 native people in the Sydney area from as many as 29 different clans. Sydney Cove from Port Jackson to Petersham was inhabited by the Cadigal clan. The principal language groups were Darug, Guringai, and Dharawal. The earliest Europeans to visit the area noted that the indigenous people were conducting activities such as camping and fishing, using trees for bark and food, collecting shells, and cooking fish. The Eora are the coastal Aboriginals of the Sydney district. The name Eora simply means "here" or "from this place", and was used by local Aboriginals to describe to the British where they came from. The Cadigal band are the traditional inhabitants of the Sydney CBD area, and their territory south of Port Jackson stretched from South Head to Petersham.

=== Colonial settlement ===
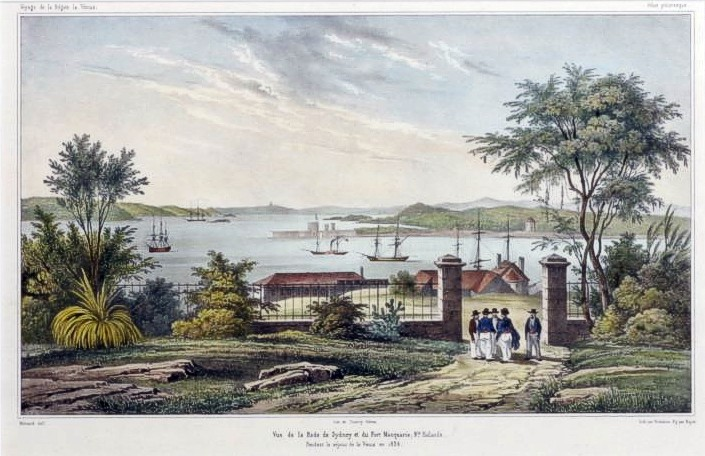
View east across Sydney Cove (Circular Quay) (c. 1841)

Sydney Cove, on which Circular Quay is located, was the site of the initial landing of the First Fleet in Port Jackson on 26 January 1788.

The governor's temporary canvas house was erected on the east side of the cove, while the western shore became the centre of the early settlement. It was the focal point from which the city of Sydney grew. The first wharf on the shore of Sydney Cove probably dated from around 1792. In 1802 it was replaced with a timber-framed wharf called "Hospital Wharf", the first public wharf of the colony (later renamed King's Wharf and Queen's Wharf).

Late 18th-century Scottish constitutional reformer Thomas Muir was sentenced to transportation to Sydney for sedition, and had a cottage on what is now Circular Quay. Thomas Muir escaped from the colony in 1796 aboard an American brig, the Otter.

The eastern side of the cove remained largely uninhabited in the early years of the colony; one notable inhabitant was Bennelong, after whom the adjacent Bennelong Point and Bennelong Apartments are named. In the early 19th century, the entire eastern shore of Circular Quay was part of the Governor's Domain, though some commercial activity developed along the shoreline. The western shore, being adjacent to the original settlement now known as The Rocks, was busier. Cadman's Cottage is a building which survives from that era, built in 1816 for the use of the governmental coxswains and their crews, it marks approximately the location of Circular Quay's natural western shore, prior to reconstruction. The Commissariat Stores (built in 1809) and Australia's first naval dock were also located on the western shore. The naval dockyard was expanded in 1818–1822 under Governor Macquarie, with four repairing docks.

=== Working port ===
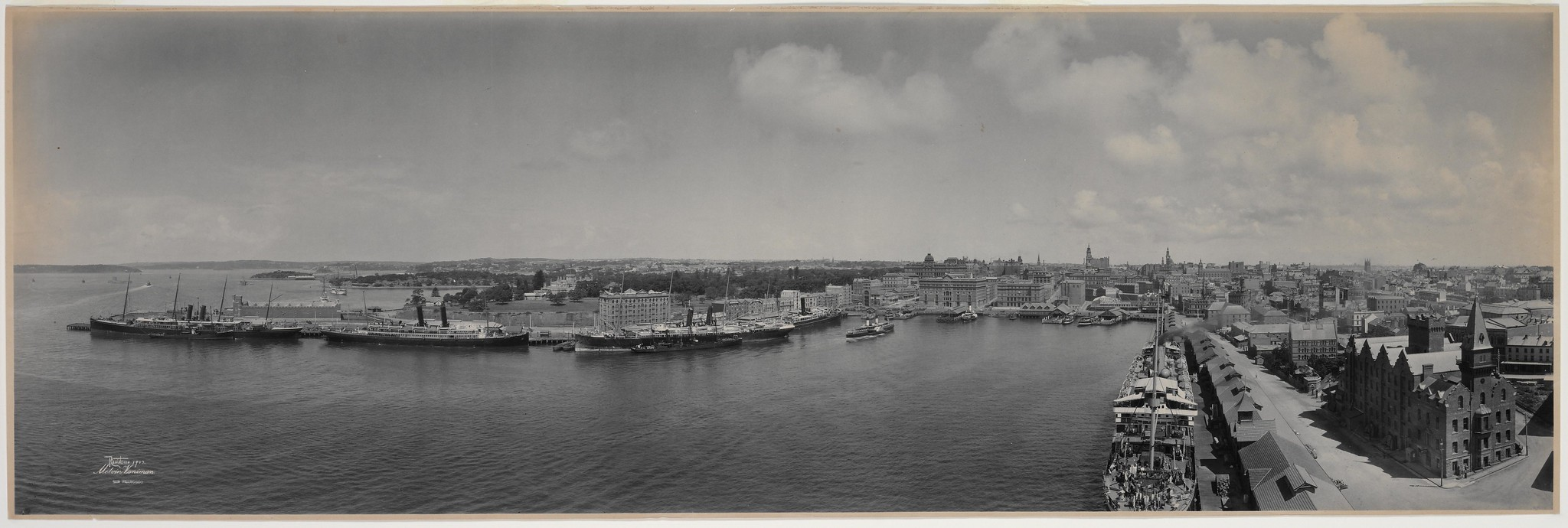
Panorama of Circular Quay from a ship's mast, 1903, by Melvin Vaniman

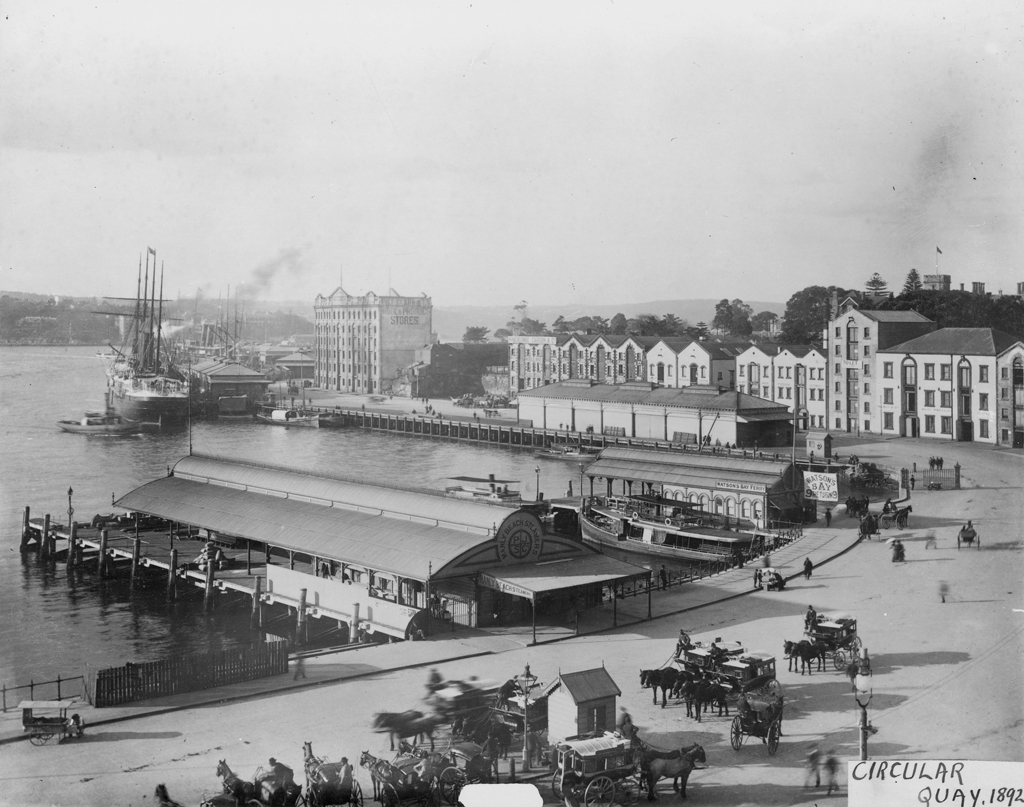
East Circular Quay in 1892, showing the "wool stores"

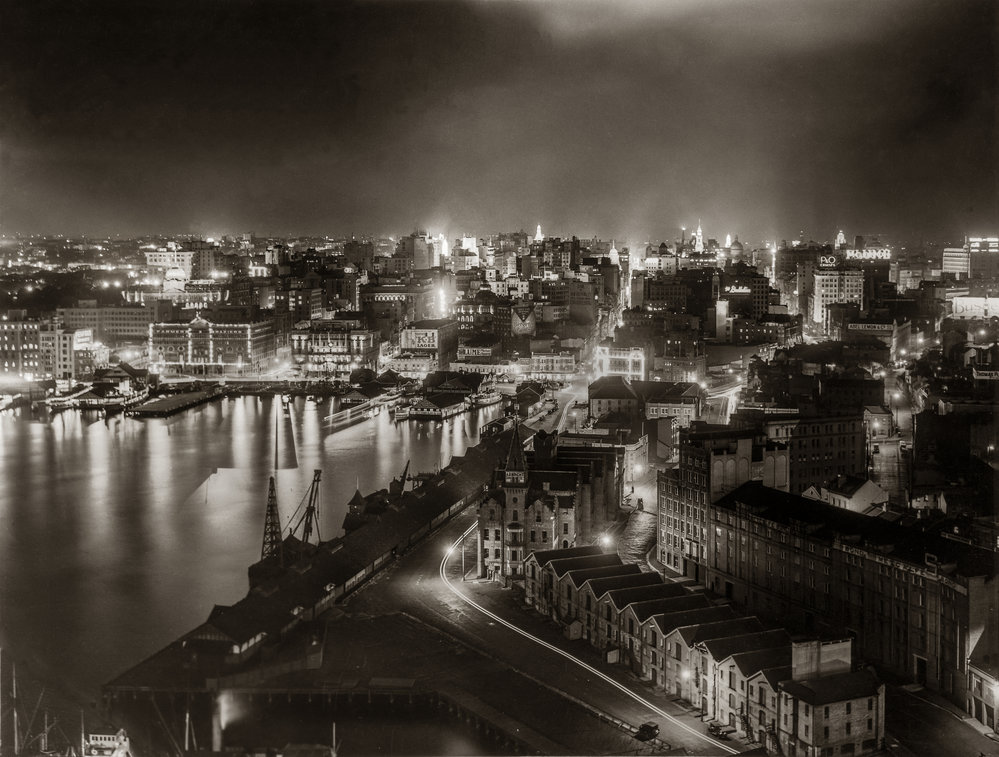
Circular Quay at night from the Sydney Harbour Bridge in 1938

Circular Quay was constructed in 1837–1844 by reconstructing the southern section of Sydney Cove with an artificial shoreline. The mouth of the Tank Stream, which flowed into Sydney Cove at the western end of Circular Quay, was in-filled. The harbour was originally known as "Semi-Circular Quay", this being the actual shape of the quay. The name was shortened for convenience. Wharves were built on the southern shore. Reflecting Circular Quay's status as the central harbour for Sydney, the Customs House was built on the southern shore in 1844–1845. During the construction of Circular Quay, the eastern side of the cove was used as a quarry and housed construction works. After the governor's residence was moved up the hill to the present Government House in the 1840s and 1850s, Macquarie Street was extended north through the Governor's Domain to Fort Macquarie. This led to the development of the area between the street and the shore into a commercial working wharf dominated by the wool trade, while the eastern side of the street remained part of the Domain. This part of Macquarie Street became known as the "wool store" end. Wool and bond stores and warehouses appeared on the site. The historic "Moore Steps" was built in 1868 as a passage between two wool stores, leading from the shore to Macquarie Street. By the 1860s, all three sides of Circular Quay were dominated by wharves and warehouses.

However, by the 1870s, much of the commercial shipping activities was moving away from Circular Quay. The harbour was becoming too small to accommodate the increasing number of large ships accessing Sydney. Instead, shipping activities moved further westwards to Darling Harbour, which also had the advantage of a railway line.

With the absence of commercial shipping, the harbour became increasingly used for passenger transport. The first ferry wharf was built on the southern shore in 1879. From the 1890s, ferry terminals came to dominate the harbour, and Circular Quay became the hub of the Sydney ferry network. The Sydney Harbour Trust was formed in 1900.

=== Transport developments ===
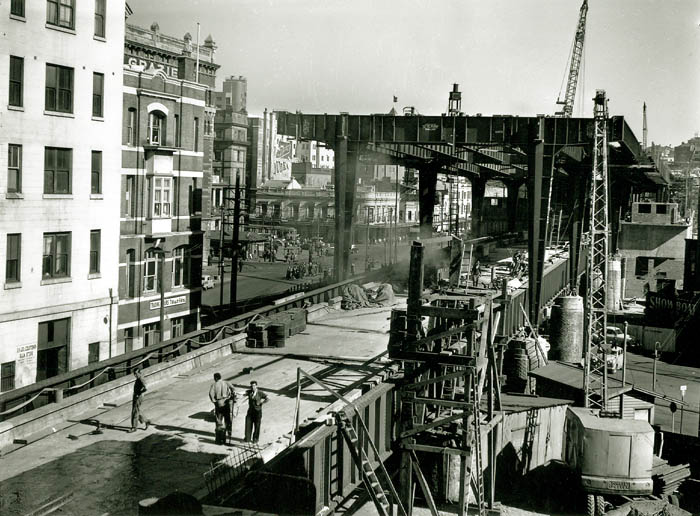
The Cahill Expressway and railway viaduct under construction at Circular Quay

Circular Quay was also a tram hub. It was the focal terminal point of most electric tram services to the Eastern Suburbs. The first tram to operate through Circular Quay was horse-drawn, running from the old Sydney Railway station to Circular Quay along Pitt Street in 1861 allowing easy transfer to ferries. Trams operated from Central station down Castlereagh Street to Circular Quay and back up Pitt Street in a large anti-clockwise loop. For many years, 27 regular services operated from Circular Quay.

From 1936, the appearance of Circular Quay was dramatically changed with the construction of a railway viaduct, and later the elevated Cahill Expressway above the viaduct, across the southern shore of the cove. Circular Quay railway station was opened on 20 January 1956 and the elevated Cahill Expressway was officially opened on 24 March 1958.

=== Building developments ===
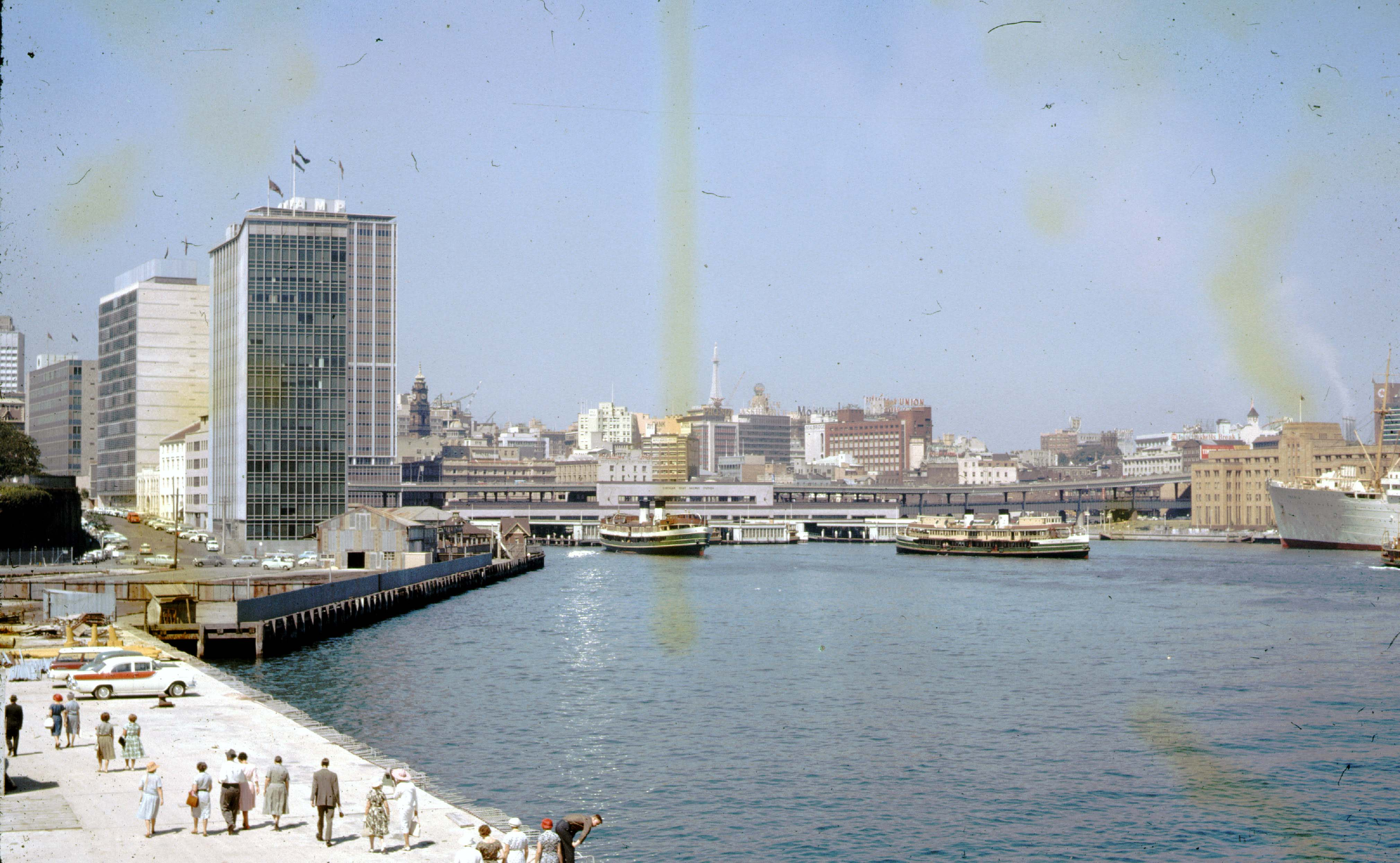
Circular Quay in 1963, viewed from the northeast

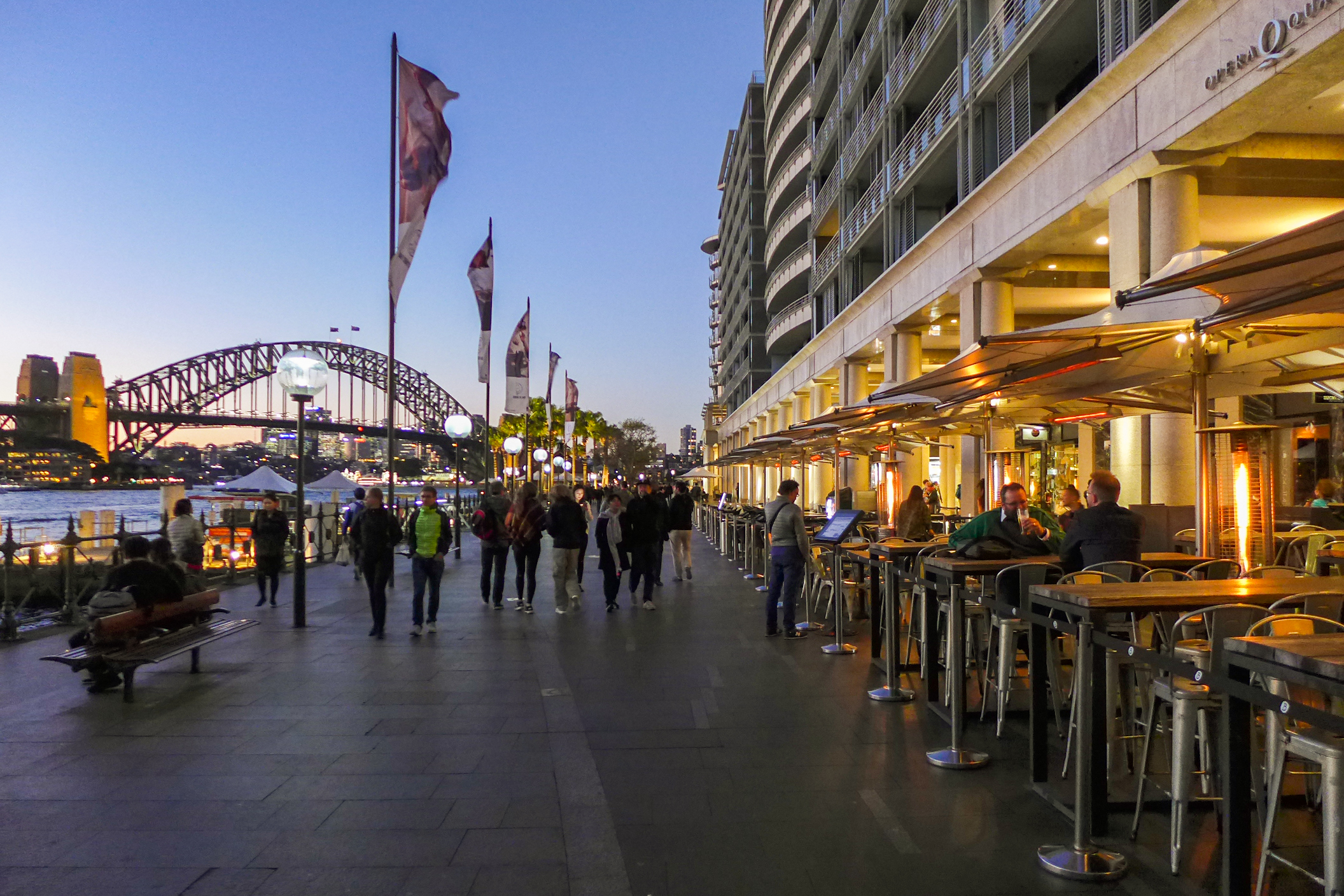
East Circular Quay waterfront in the early 21st century

The construction of the viaduct led to the demolition of the old Maritime Services Board building on the south-western shore. A replacement was constructed further north in 1940, and is today the Museum of Contemporary Art. Further north, the Sydney Cove Passenger Terminal was built in 1958–1960 to accommodate the increasing number of passengers arriving by ship. The building was renovated in 1988, 2000 and 2014. Large liners and cruise ships often dock here, their size dominating the cove. East Circular Quay was redeveloped from the 1950s with the replacement of wool stores with modernist commercial buildings. The Sydney height limit was increased from 46 to 279 metres (150 to 915 ft) in 1959, and a number of Sydney's first skyscrapers were built around Circular Quay. The AMP Building on the southern shore was Sydney's tallest building when completed in 1962. In 1973, the Sydney Opera House was completed at the northeastern end of Sydney Cove.

Between 1971 and 1989, Colonial Mutual Life acquired land along Circular Quay for a large scale development. The initial design caused significant controversy around the country, including intervention by the Prime Minister, Paul Keating, and internationally. A revised 1992 design had the developer reducing building height and providing a colonnade for public access, in exchange for the development extending further towards the foreshore. The resulting development of Bennelong Apartments (nicknamed by critics as The Toaster), and is criticised for its positioning and for obscuring views of the Sydney Opera House from the main pedestrian approach.

== Transport ==
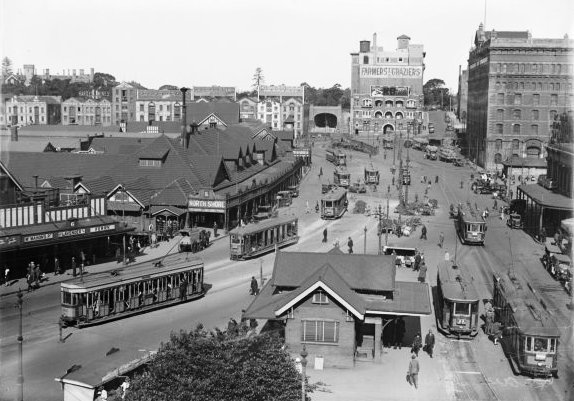
Trams in Circular Quay (early 20th century)

Time-lapse of boat and ferry traffic at Circular Quay

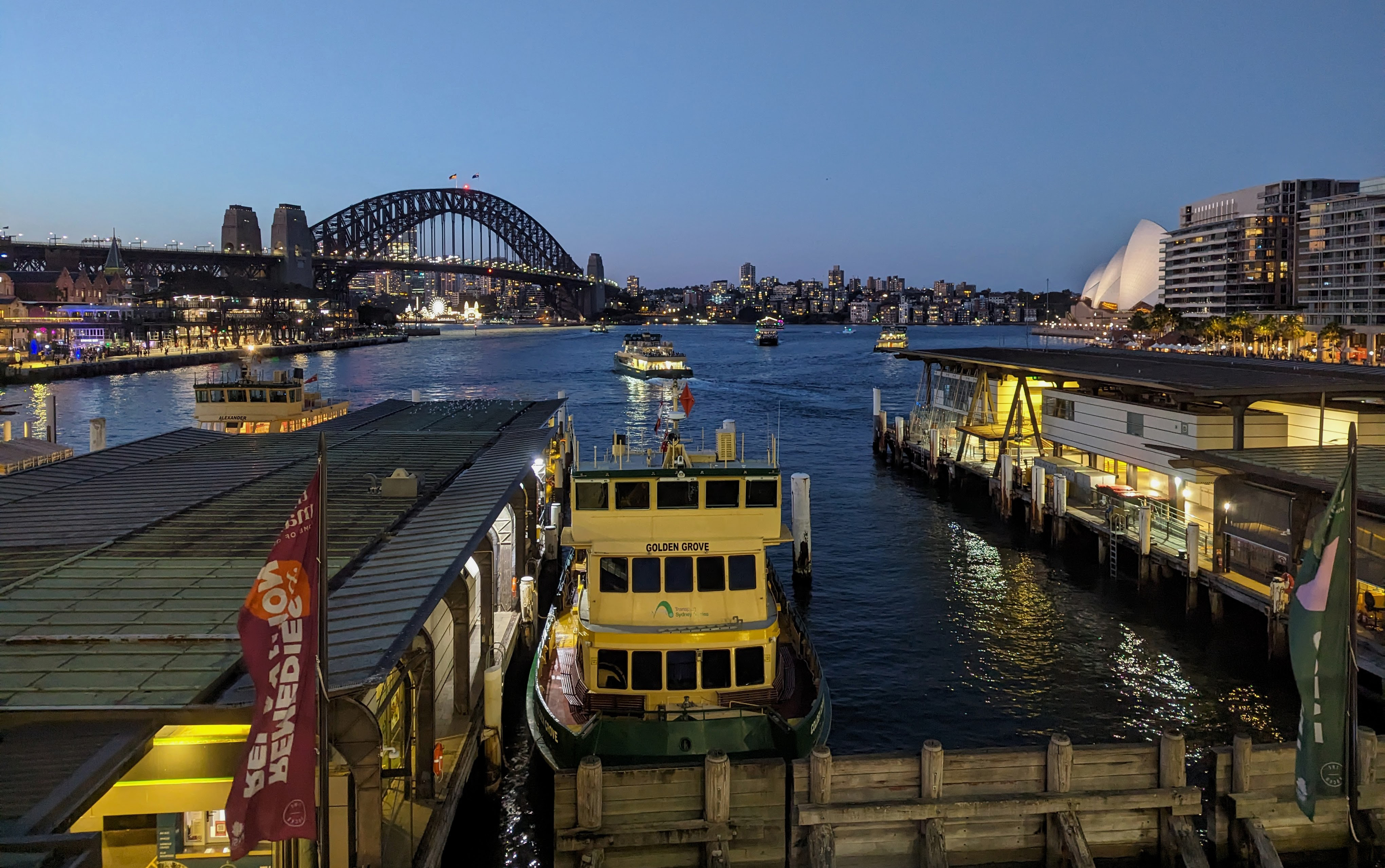
View from the suburban railway station

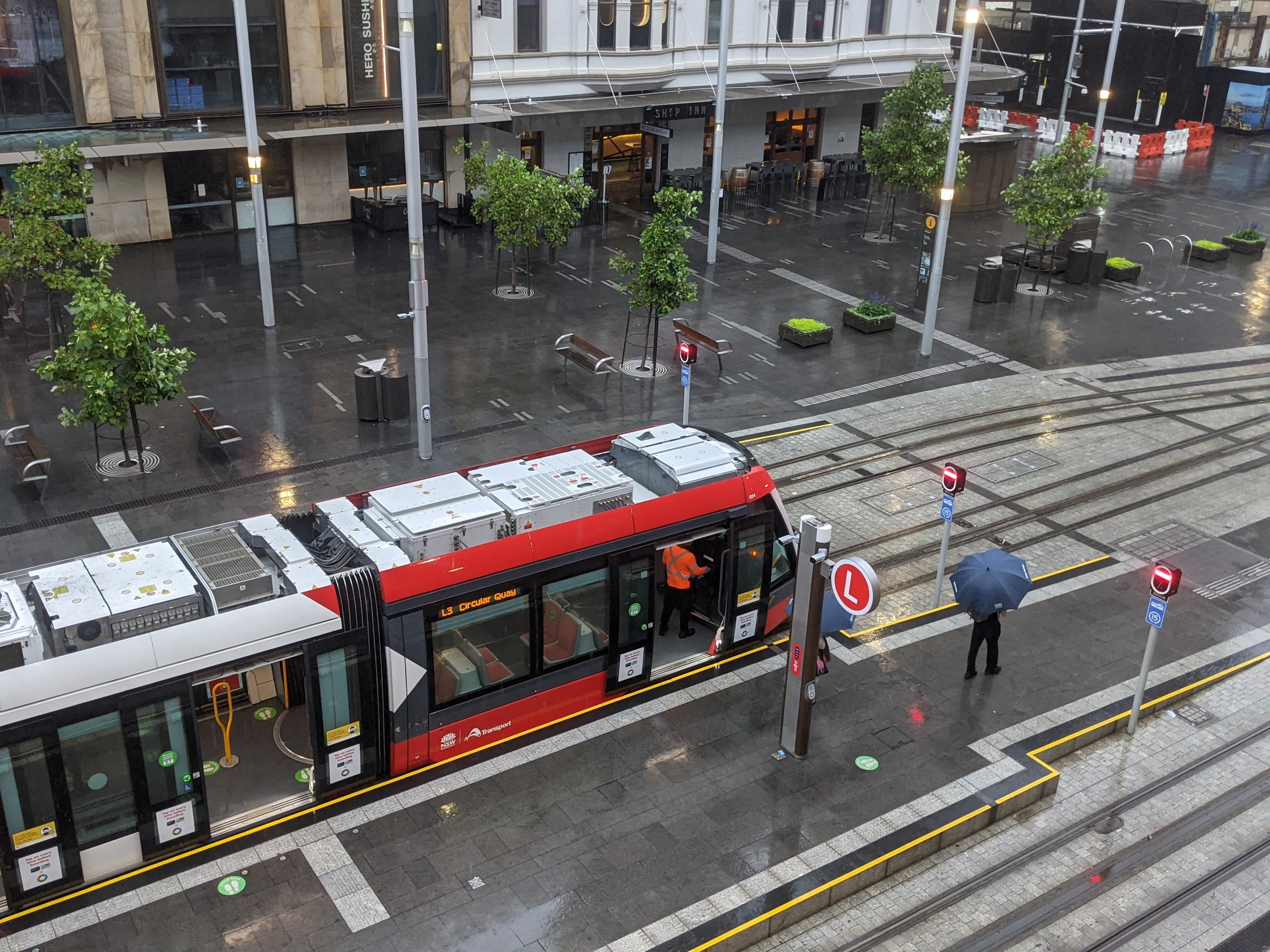
Sydney Light Rail at Circular Quay

Circular Quay is a major Sydney transport hub, with a large ferry, rail and bus interchange. The Cahill Expressway is a prominent feature of the quay, running from the east, over the elevated railway station to join the Sydney Harbour Bridge in the west. International ships have docked and moored at Circular Quay since the earliest years of the colony. The Overseas Passenger Terminal is a major piece of Sydney transport infrastructure serving cruise ships and ocean liners and their passengers.

Circular Quay railway station is the only station on the City Circle that is above ground. The platform looks out over the ferry terminus, providing views of Sydney Harbour, including the bridge and Opera House.

The wharf complex hosts five commuter ferry wharves and is the terminus for all public ferry routes in Sydney Harbour and the Parramatta River other than the Mortlake Ferry between Mortlake and Putney. Circular Quay was formerly a large tram terminus and interchange. As many Sydney bus routes follow the previous tram lines, the tram terminus in Alfred Street became a major bus terminus for many bus routes. In March 1995, the road on the eastern side of Circular Quay which served as a bus layover was closed and converted into a pedestrian zone. A redesign of CBD bus services in October 2015 reduced the number of bus routes serving Circular Quay. In 2019, the CBD and South East Light Rail to Kingsford and Randwick opened with a terminus in Alfred Street.

== Culture ==
Circular Quay is a focal point for community celebrations, due to its central Sydney location between the Sydney Opera House and the Sydney Harbour Bridge. It is one of the main congregation points for Sydney New Year's Eve.

Circular Quay is also the home of Sydney's Museum of Contemporary Art and the City of Sydney Library in the heritage-listed Customs House. Sydney Writers Walk – a series of plaques commemorating writers with some connection to Sydney – was installed in the footpath along Circular Quay in 1991. In autumn 2006, the largest open-air art exhibition ever in Australia took place on Circular Quay: Over 7 weeks the Berlin Buddy Bears visited Sydney. Each bear represented a member-country of the United Nations, symbolizing the universal principles of peace, freedom and friendship.

The Quay is mentioned in the classic song "And the Band Played Waltzing Matilda" (1971) by Eric Bogle. "Circular Quay" is the title of a song from Dr. Robert of The Blow Monkeys which appeared on his 1994 debut solo album, Realms of Gold. The song was also issued as a single in the same year.

Water Polo by the Sea is held there every year by Australian Water Polo with the Australia men's national water polo team take on the International All Stars.

== See also ==
- Gold Fields House
- Museum of Contemporary Art Australia
- Overseas Passenger Terminal
- Sydney Cove railings
