= Alfred Street, Sydney =

Road in Sydney, Australia

Coordinates: 33°51′42″S 151°12′37″E

Alfred Street, Sydney New South Wales
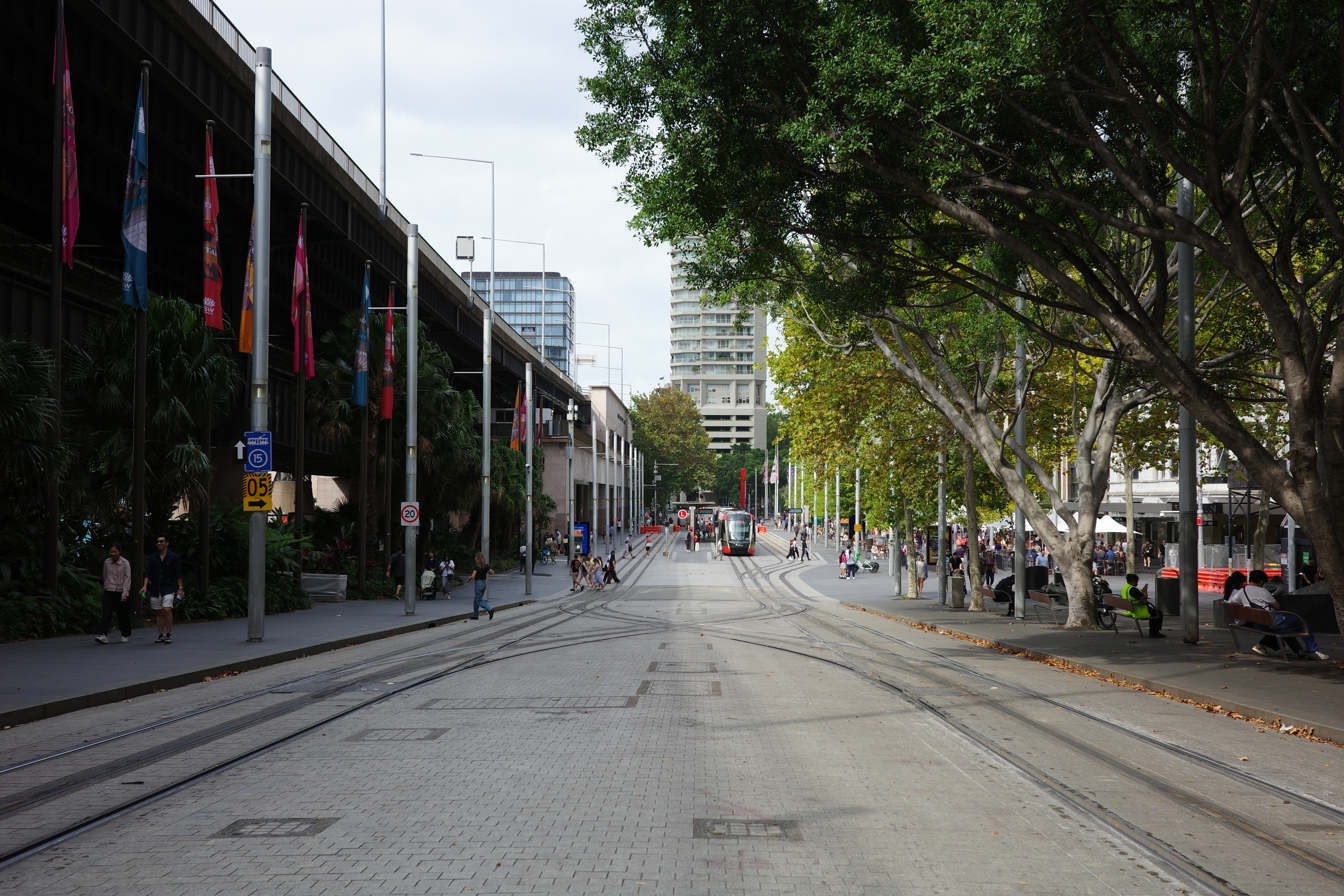
- Alfred Street in 2026

General information
- Type: Street
- Length: 300 m (1,000 ft)

Major junctions
- Western end: George Street
- Pitt Street; Loftus Street; Young Street
- Eastern end: Phillip Street

Alfred Street is a street in Sydney, New South Wales, Australia, in the local government area of the City of Sydney. It runs west–east from George Street to Phillip Street.

== Details ==
The alignment of Albert Street was formed in 1845 when the swamps of the Tank Stream were drained and a seawall built. It was named after Prince Alfred in 1875 when split from Albert Street.

To the north it is bounded by the Cahill Expressway, Circular Quay railway station and Circular Quay ferry wharf. To the south lie a number of notable buildings including Gold Fields House, 1 Macquarie Place, Customs House and the AMP Building.

In February 1999, Alfred Street was closed outside Customs House with the road converted to a plaza. Until the line closed in 1957, trams terminated in Alfred Street. Having latterly been only used by State Transit Authority bus services, in October 2015 the section between George and Loftus streets closed to vehicular traffic to allow it to be rebuilt as the terminus of the CBD and South East Light Rail that opened in December 2019.
