= AMP Building, Sydney =

AMP Building
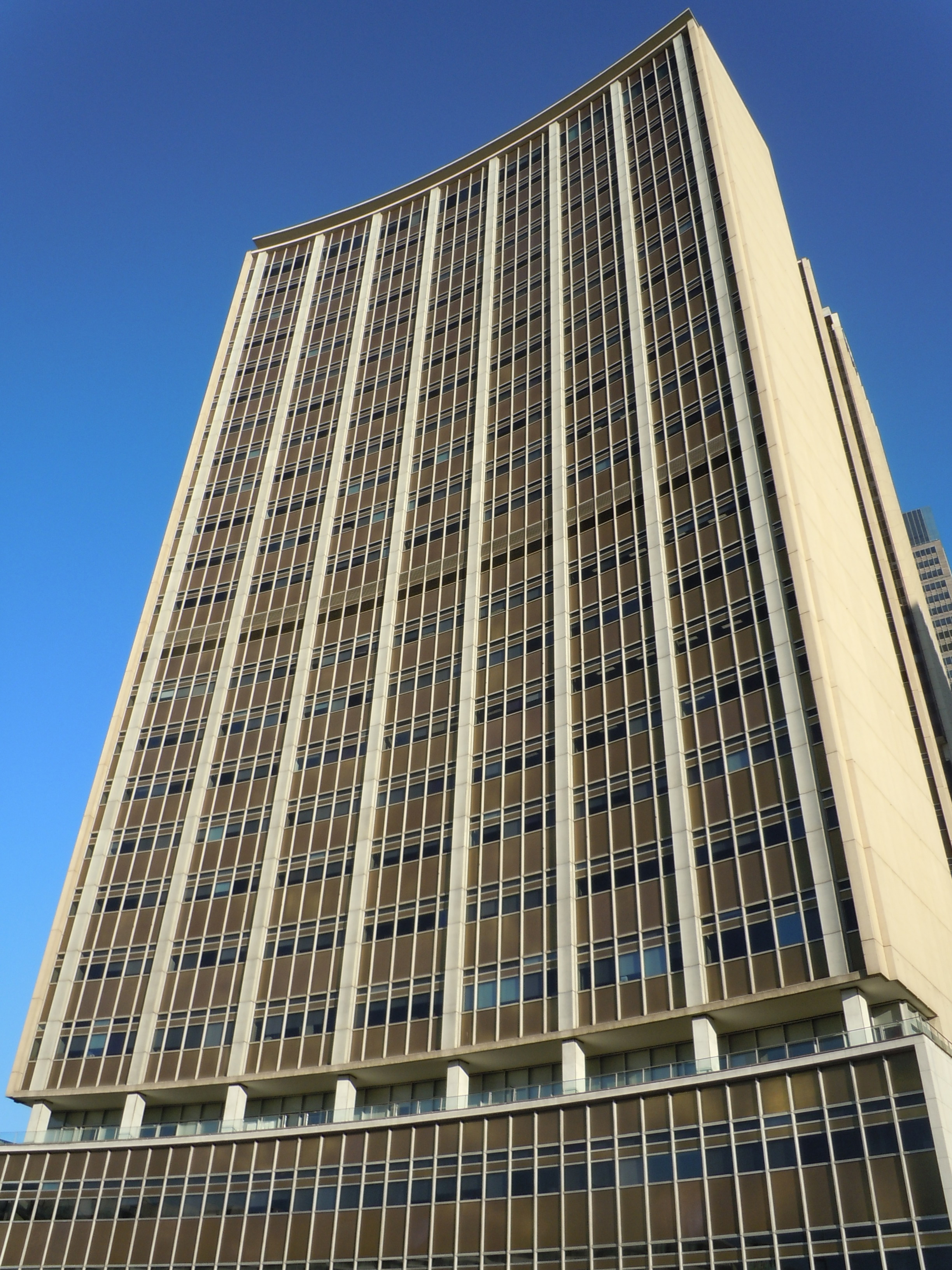

General information
- Type: Office building
- Architectural style: Modernist
- Location: 33 Alfred Street, Circular Quay, Sydney, Australia
- Coordinates: 33°51′42″S 151°12′31″E
- Opened: 23 November 1962; 63 years ago
- Owner: AMP

Height
- Height: 114 metres (374 ft)

Technical details
- Floor count: 26

Design and construction
- Architecture firm: Peddle, Thorp & Walker
- Main contractor: Mainline
- Awards: New South Wales Enduring Architecture Award, 2013

The AMP Building is a high-rise office tower in the Sydney central business district on the corner of Alfred, Phillip and Young streets.

== History ==
In 1958, the AMP Society announced plans to build a new headquarters in the Sydney central business district on the corner of Alfred, Phillip and Young Streets. It was designed by Peddle, Thorp and Walker architects and was the tallest building in Australia at the time, at 26 storeys and 117 m (384 ft) when completed in 1962, changing the skyline of the city.

It was opened on 23 November 1962 by Prime Minister Robert Menzies.

The building included a ducted air-conditioning system (a very new technology at the time), and its beams had the longest span yet seen in Australian office buildings. There was also an automatic document conveyor for delivering mail around the building, and its lifts moved at a record 300 m (980 ft) per minute. It had an observation deck on its roof and had over a million visitors in the first two years.

The building was extensively renovated in the early 2020s, and became known as its address, 33 Alfred Street.

== Heritage listing ==
In January 2025, the AMP Building was listed on the New South Wales State Heritage Register, "in recognition of its groundbreaking contribution to the state’s architectural and cultural history".
