= List of tallest buildings in Sydney =

Skyline of Sydney
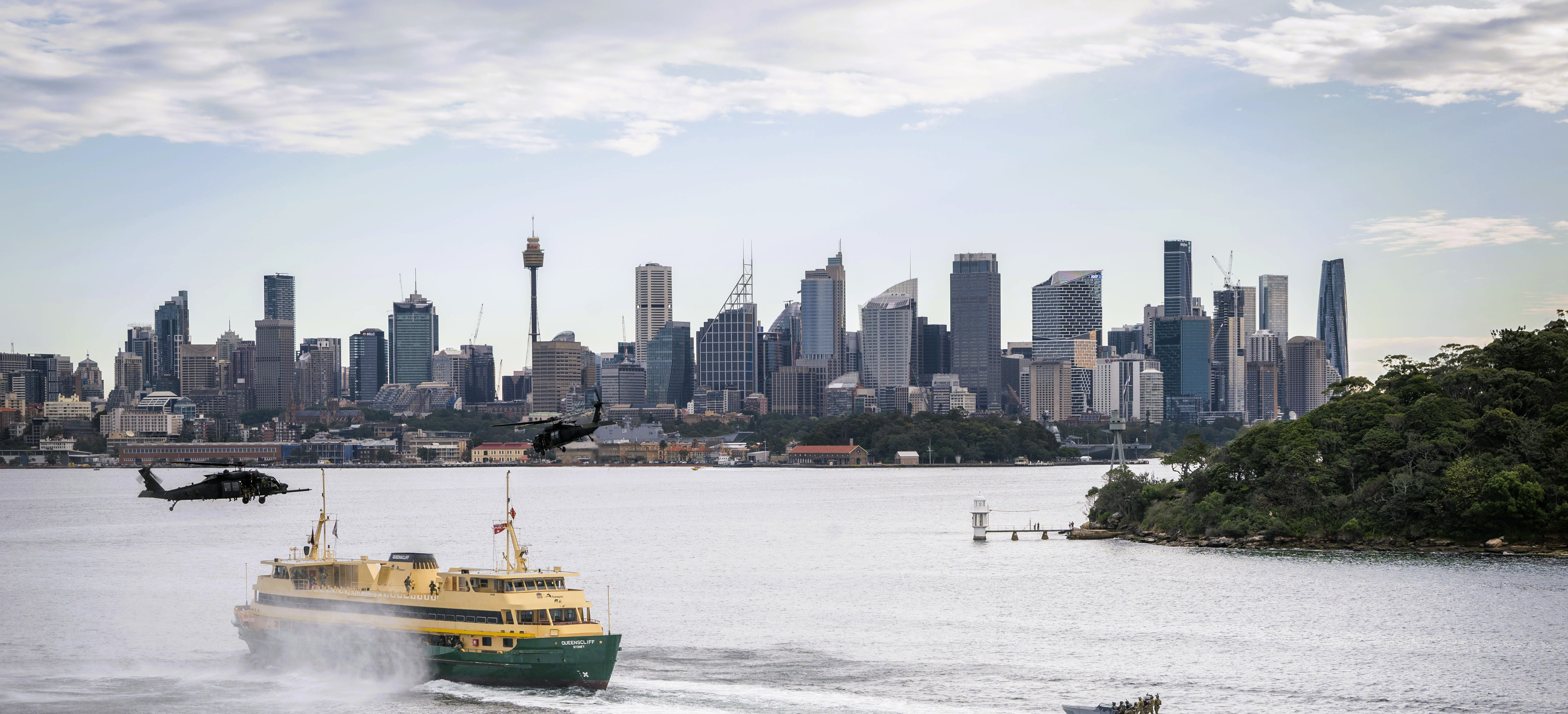
- The central business district skyline in 2025
- Tallest building: Crown Sydney (2020)
- Tallest building height: 271.3 m (890 ft)
- Tallest structure: Sydney Tower (1981)
- Tallest structure height: 309 m (1,014 ft)
- First 150 m+ building: Australia Square (1967)

Number of tall buildings
- Taller than 100 m (328 ft): 169 (2026)
- Taller than 150 m (492 ft): 63 (2026)
- Taller than 200 m (656 ft): 19 (2026)

Sydney, the largest city in Australia, is home to 1,168 completed high-rise buildings, more than any other city in Australia. Of those completed or topped out, the entire city (including metropolitan suburbs) has 63 buildings that reach a height of at least 150 metres (490 ft), of which 19 reach a height of at least 200 metres (660 ft) – the second-highest number of skyscrapers in an Australian city, as well as a further 17 buildings rising to at least 150 metres (490 ft) in height currently under construction.

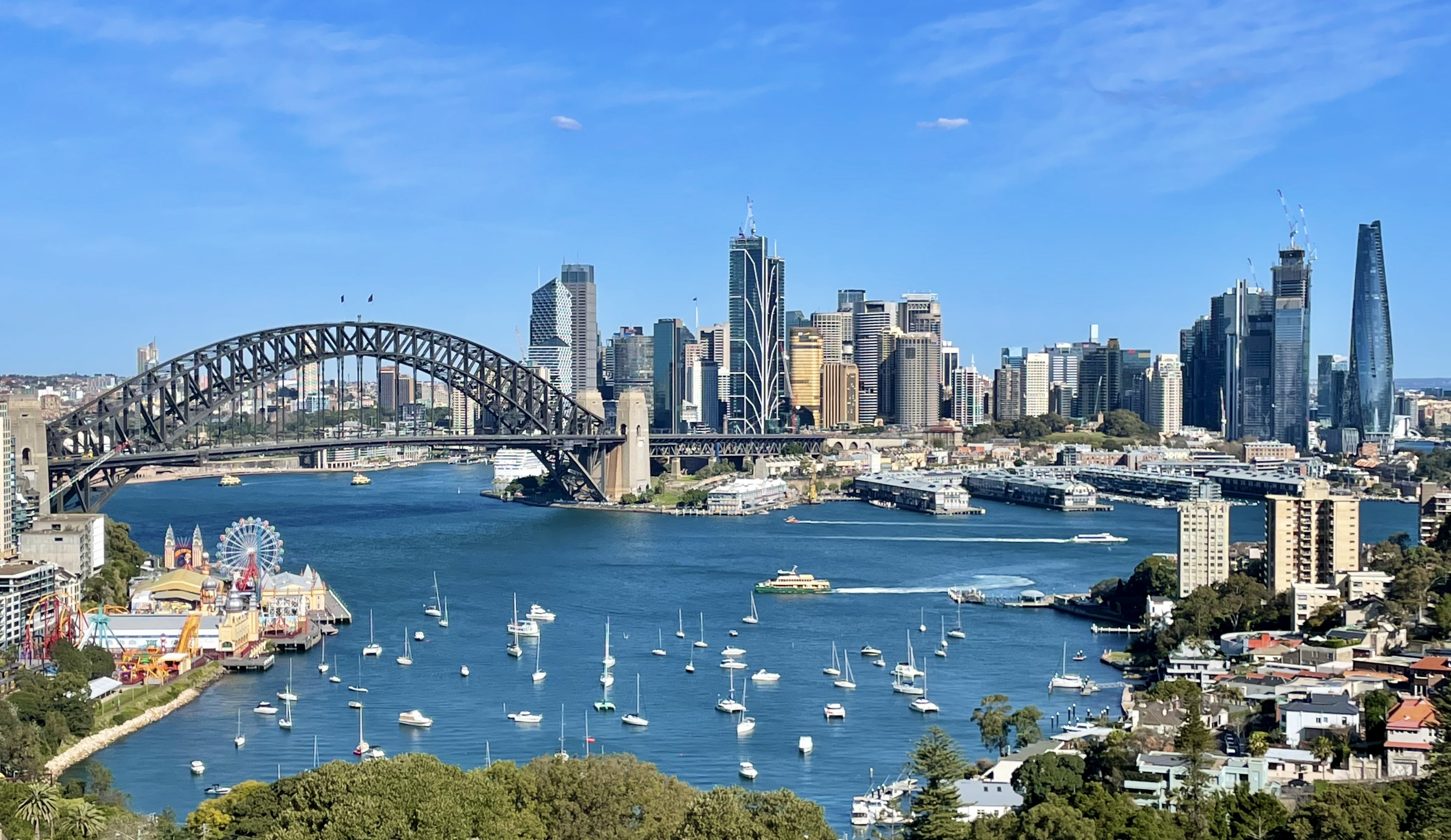
The central business district viewed from the north-west, 2022

Although the tallest buildings in the city have historically been concentrated in the central business district and immediate surrounding areas such as Barangaroo and Ultimo, suburbs within the Sydney metropolitan area have all seen a substantial surge in the development of high rises and skyscrapers in recent years, with major satellite centres such as Chatswood, Parramatta, North Sydney, St Leonards and Macquarie Park all witnessing or playing host to the construction of skyscrapers rising at or above 150 metres (490 ft). As a result, Sydney has the tallest building and most skyscrapers (reaching at least 150 metres) outside an inner-city area or core in Australia.

Sydney was one of the first cities in Australia and internationally to welcome the introduction of skyscrapers and high-rise office blocks in the mid–20th century, alongside cities in the United States, including New York City and Chicago. Witnessing a boom in the 20th century, Sydney has played host to various buildings which have been the tallest building in Australia including St James' Church, the Sydney Town Hall, the Garden Palace, the General Post Office, AWA Tower, AMP Building, 25 Martin Place and the Australia Square tower in 1967 at 170 metres (560 ft) tall, which was Australia's first true skyscraper as defined as rising at least 150 metres high. Since 2020, Crown Sydney has been Sydney's tallest building and the 4th-tallest building in Australia, rising to a height of 271 metres (889 ft).

== History ==
=== 19th century ===
Sydney played host to Australia's first tallest building in 1824 with the construction of St James' Church. Standing at a height of 52 metres (171 ft), it was commissioned by Governor Lachlan Macquarie in 1819, designed by Francis Greenway and constructed between 1820 and 1824 using convict labour. The partially complete Sydney Town Hall, built in Victorian Second Empire style, surpassed this height in 1878 with the completion of its clock tower that stood at a height of 57 metres (187 ft). This title was briefly held until the completion of the Garden Palace in 1879, standing at a height of 64 metres (210 ft). The Garden Palace likewise only held this title as tallest briefly, after its demise from a fire in 1882. Hence, the Sydney Town Hall once again became Sydney's tallest until 1891 with the completion of the General Post Office. Standing at a height of 73 metres (240 ft), the GPO was at the time described upon opening by the Postmaster General as a building that "will not be surpassed by any other similar structure in the southern hemisphere".

=== 20th century ===
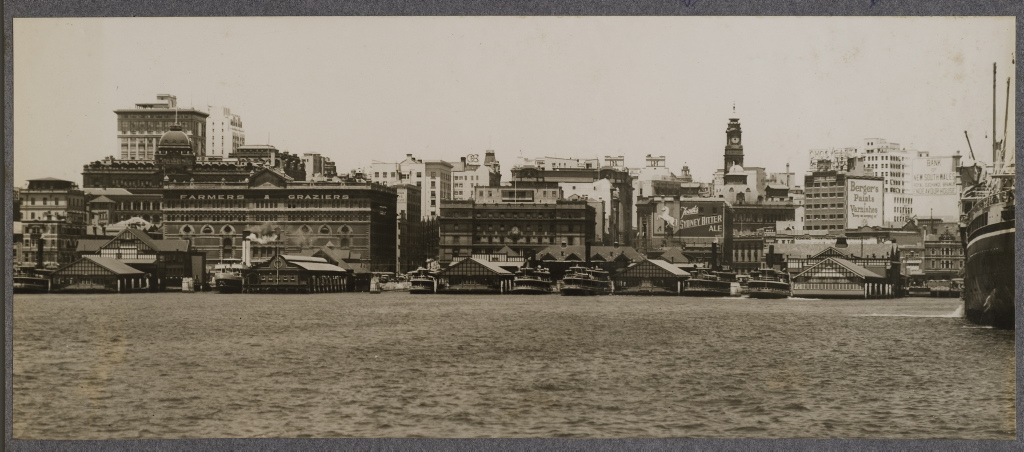
The Circular Quay and city skyline, 1920s

Towards the end of the 19th century and throughout the beginning of the 20th century, advances in building technology and design coupled with rising urban land values meant that high rise buildings became an attractive proposition in Sydney. Considered to be Sydney's first high-rise office building, Culwulla Chambers, was completed in 1912 and stood at a height of 50 metres (160 ft). Designed by Spain, Cosh and Minnett (with Rupert Minnett), the building consisted of 14 floors and cost £100,000 to build, equivalent of approximately $1 million in today's money. This new wave of construction of taller buildings consequently raised concerns over fire risks, namely the inadequate firefighting resources of the period that failed to reach such heights. The fire in the 8 storey Anthony Hordern & Sons building in 1901, which resulted in the death of five people, was notably one of the first cases to raise such concerns. In 1907, Alfred Webb, then the Superintendent of the Sydney Metropolitan Fire Brigade, described how it was "a suicidal policy to allow buildings of 100 feet to go up. Our extension ladders rise to a height of 80 feet, and it might be possible to add another 10 feet to them; but the effectiveness of their working is materially decreased as the height is added to." Additionally, public backlash against increased heights also became apparent during this period, primarily stemming from sentiments that taller buildings did not match the aesthetic of Sydney's streetscape and that they would become a source of increased overcrowding and congestion. As a result, the Height of Buildings Act was passed in 1912, which limited all new buildings to a height of 46 metres (151 ft). This restriction stunted the height of Sydney's buildings, lasting until 1957.

Despite these height restrictions, 1939 saw the completion of the AWA Tower, which finally surpassed the General Post Office's title as Sydney's tallest after 48 years. At a height of 112 metres (367 ft), the AWA tower also became the city's first building to surpass a height of 100 metres (330 ft), and would go on to stay as the tallest until 1962.

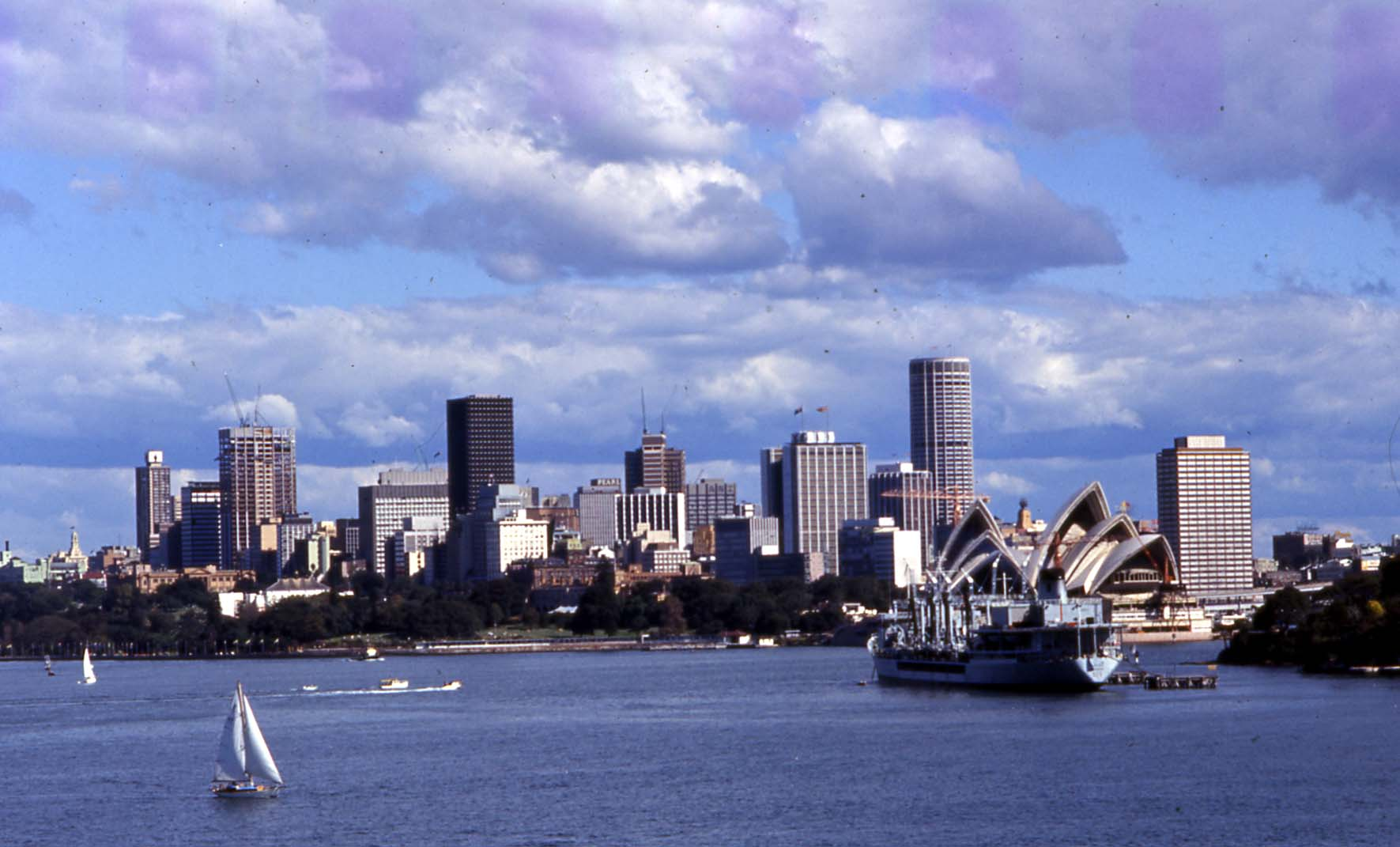
The Sydney skyline in 1970. Visible (from right) is Gold Fields House, Australia Square, the AMP Building, and the State Office Block

==== 1960s and 1970s ====
With growing demand for office space, the abolition of the 46 metres (151 ft) height limit in 1957 saw a subsequent construction boom for taller buildings beginning in the late 50s through to the early 1960s. During this period, Sydney played host to the construction of various new towers that would subsequently stand as the tallest in the nation. In 1962, the modernist AMP Building was completed, becoming the tallest building in Australia at a height of 115 metres (377 ft). Shortly after, Australia Square was completed in 1967, also taking the title of tallest in Australia at 170 metres (560 ft). At its completion, Australia Square was the world's tallest lightweight concrete building and also the first skyscraper in Australia at least 150 metres (490 ft) in height, the minimum height used by the Council on Vertical Urbanism (CVU) for a high-rise building to be a skyscraper.

Following this, the 1970s saw Sydney continue its construction boom and status as the city with the nation's tallest buildings. In 1976, the AMP Centre (now the Quay Quarter Tower) was completed, standing at a record height of 188 metres (617 ft). This title was short-lived, with the completion of the MLC Centre in 1977 (designed by Harry Seidler), which stood at a height of 228 metres (748 ft), the first building in Australia to surpass 200 metres (660 ft) in height.

==== 1980s and 1990s ====
The Sydney skyline as it appeared from Bondi Junction in 1984 featuring the Sydney Tower. Several major skyscrapers, including Chifley Tower and Governor Phillip Tower, had not yet been built.

Since 1981, the Sydney Tower has stood as the tallest structure in Sydney at 309 metres (1,014 ft), though as an observation tower, it fails to be classified as a building as defined by architectural standards set by the CVU. In 1992, the Chifley Tower became the tallest building in Sydney at a height of 244 metres (801 ft). The 1990s was also a period which saw the construction of numerous residential skyscrapers, starting with The Peak in 1996 at a height of 168 metres (551 ft), followed by the Century Tower in 1997 at a height of 183 metres (600 ft).

=== 21st century ===
A 235-metre (771 ft) height restriction implementation persisted in Sydney's building regulations well into the early 2010s. However, this height restriction was lifted in 2016, allowing buildings to be built as high as 310 metres (1,020 ft) on condition that public spaces were not overshadowed. This was further raised to 330 metres (1,080 ft) at the end of 2019.

Sydney's most recent residential tower, 505 George Street, will rise 270 metres, comprising 80 storeys much of it serviced apartments. As the tower penetrates Sydney Airport's Obstacle Limitation Surfaces (OLS) it will require an Aeronautical Impact assessment approval, which it received in 2020, although construction has yet to start as of 2024.

The current tallest building in Sydney, and the fourth-tallest in Australia, is Crown Sydney, completed in 2020 and standing at a height of 271 metres (889 ft), overtaking the Chifley Tower's previous title as the tallest in Sydney standing at a height of 244 metres (801 ft).

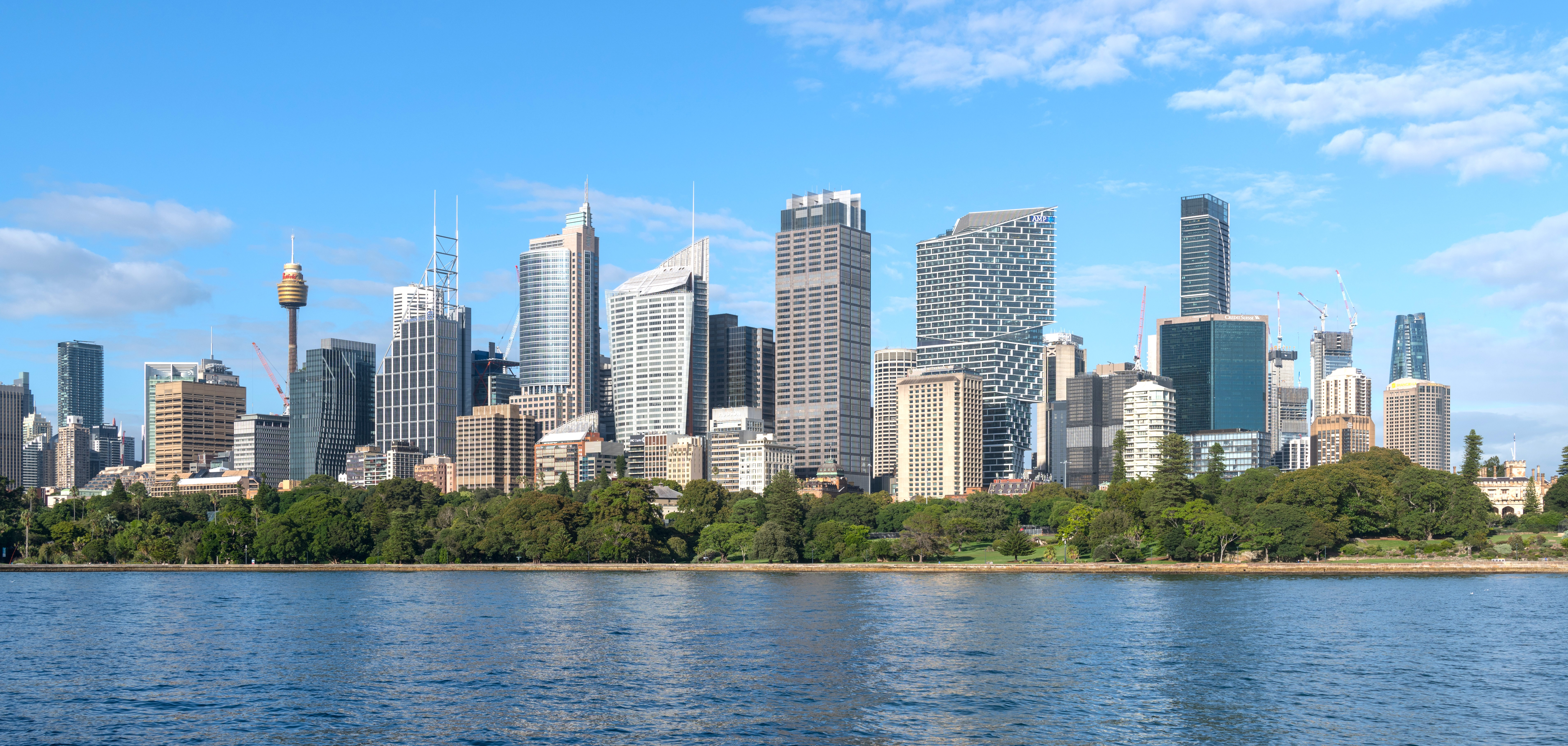
An eastern view of the Sydney central business district skyline, 2023

== Tallest buildings ==
This list ranks completed buildings in Sydney that stands at least 150 metres (490 ft) tall, including new buildings which have fully reached their architectural height. All structures are measured to the highest architectural detail, including spires.

Note: Sydney Tower is defined as a structure, as opposed to a building. It is included here for comparison purposes, but is not counted in any figures or totals.

Was Sydney's tallest building when completed

| Rank | Name | Image | Height m (ft) | Floors | Year | Location | Purpose | Notes |
|---|---|---|---|---|---|---|---|---|
| N/A | Sydney Tower | | 309 (1,014) | – | 1981 | 100 Market Street CBD 33°52′14″S 151°12′32″E | Observation and telecommunications | Observation and telecommunications tower, not a habitable building. Included for comparison purposes. |
| 1 | Crown Sydney | | 271 (889) | 75 | 2020 | 1-11 Barangaroo Avenue Barangaroo 33°51′44″S 151°12′04″E | Mixed use | Tallest building in Sydney since 2020, 4th-tallest building in Australia. Completed in December 2020. |
| 2 | Salesforce Tower | | 263 (863) | 56 | 2022 | 180 George Street CBD 33°51′45″S 151°12′31″E | Commercial | Tallest commercial building in Sydney since 2022. Completed in November 2022 |
| 3 | One Sydney Harbour (Tower 1) | | 247 (810) | 72 | 2024 | 88 Barangaroo Avenue Barangaroo 33°51′46″S 151°12′06″E | Residential | Tallest residential building in Sydney since 2024. Designed by Renzo Piano |
| 4 | Chifley Tower | | 244 (801) | 50 | 1992 | 2 Chifley Square CBD 33°51′57″S 151°12′42″E | Commercial | Tallest building in Sydney from 1992 to 2019. Originally 241 m until a 3 m lightning rod was added in 2000. Designed by Kohn Pedersen Fox. |
| 5 | Citigroup Centre | | 243 (797) | 50 | 2000 | 2 Park Street CBD 33°52′22″S 151°12′27″E | Commercial | Designed by Crone Partners |
| 6 | Deutsche Bank Place | | 240 (790) | 39 | 2005 | 126 Phillip Street CBD 33°52′00″S 151°12′42″E | Commercial | The second-tallest building in the world with fewer than 40 floors. 160 m to roof. Designed by Norman Foster. |
| 7 | 55 Pitt Street | | 238 (781) | 56 | 2027 | 55 Pitt Street CBD 33°51′46″S 151°12′32″E | Commercial | Structurally topped out |
| 8 | Greenland Centre | | 237 (778) | 67 | 2021 | 115 Bathurst Street CBD 33°52′29″S 151°12′27″E | Residential | Completed in March 2021. Tallest residential building in Sydney from 2021 to 2022 |
| =9 | One Sydney Harbour (Tower 2) | | 230 (750) | 68 | 2024 | 88 Barangaroo Avenue Barangaroo 33°51′47″S 151°12′07″E | Residential | Designed by Renzo Piano |
| = 9 | Meriton World Tower | | 230 (750) | 75 | 2004 | 85 Liverpool Street CBD 33°52′36″S 151°12′24″E | Residential | Tallest residential building in Sydney from 2004 to 2020. Part of the World Square complex. Designed by Nation Fender Katsalidis. |
| 11 | 25 Martin Place | | 228 (748) | 60 | 1977 | 19 Martin Place CBD 33°52′07″S 151°12′34″E | Commercial | 244 m to antenna and 227 m to roof. Tallest building in Sydney from 1977 to 1992. Designed by Harry Seidler. |
| 12 | Governor Phillip Tower | | 227 (745) | 61 | 1993 | 1 Farrer Place CBD 33°51′50″S 151°12′41″E | Commercial | 254 m to antenna and 227 m to roof. Designed by Denton Corker Marshall. |
| 13 | 6 & 8 Parramatta Square | | 225 (738) | 57 | 2022 | 6-8 Parramatta Square Parramatta 33°48′59″S 151°00′14″E | Commercial | Tallest building in Parramatta. Designed by Johnson Pilton Walker |
| 14 | Latitude | | 222 (728) | 45 | 2004 | 680 George Street CBD 33°52′39″S 151°12′23″E | Commercial | 190 m to roof. Part of the World Square complex. |
| 15 | Aurora Place | | 219 (719) | 41 | 2000 | 88 Phillip Street CBD 33°51′53″S 151°12′43″E | Commercial | More commonly known as Aurora Place but officially RBS Tower. 188 m to roof. Designed by Renzo Piano. |
| 16 | 8 Phillip Street | | 218 (715) | 66 | 2025 | 8 Phillip Street, Parramatta 33°48′42″S 151°00′12″E | Residential | Tallest residential building in Parramatta. Topped out in June 2025. |
| 17 | International Tower 1 | | 217 (712) | 50 | 2016 | 100 Barangaroo Avenue Barangaroo 33°51′50″S 151°12′08″E | Commercial | Designed by Rogers Stirk Harbour + Partners. |
| 18 | Quay Quarter Tower | | 216 (709) | 54 | 1976/2022 | 50 Bridge Street CBD 33°51′47″S 151°12′41″E | Commercial | Originally built as the AMP Centre in 1976 at 188 m (617 ft); the tallest building in Sydney upon completion. Redeveloped from 2018. Designed by 3XN Architects. |
| 19 | 180 George Street (North Tower) | | 213 (699) | 67 | 2023 | 180 George Street Parramatta 33°48′52″S 151°00′37″E | Residential | Tallest residential building in Parramatta |
| 20 | One Circular Quay | | 198 (650) | 60 | 2026 | 1 Alfred Street CBD 33°51′42″S 151°12′31″E | Residential | Structurally topped out in April 2025 |
| 21 | ANZ Tower | | 195 (640) | 46 | 2013 | 161 Castlereagh Street CBD 33°52′20″S 151°12′30″E | Commercial | Designed by Francis-Jones Morehen Thorp |
| =22 | Trilogy - Tower C | | 193 (633) | 59 | 2025 | 100 Talavera Road Macquarie Park 33°46′27″S 151°07′13″E | Residential | Tallest building in Macquarie Park. Topped out in August 2025 |
| =22 | 259 George Street | | 193 (633) | 48 | 1982 | 259 George Street CBD 33°51′50″S 151°12′23″E | Commercial | Construction began in 1970 and was not completed until 1982, as the project was delayed many times. |
| 24 | 180 George Street (South Tower) | | 189 (620) | 59 | 2023 | 180 George Street Parramatta 33°48′54″S 151°00′36″E | Residential | |
| =25 | Atlassian Central | | 183 (600) | 42 | 2026 | 8-10 Lee Street Haymarket 33°53′01″S 151°12′16″E | Commercial | Tallest hybrid timber building in the world. Structurally topped out |
| =25 | Century Tower | | 183 (600) | 50 | 1997 | 343 Pitt Street CBD 33°52′32″S 151°12′27″E | Residential | Tallest residential building in Sydney from 1997 to 2004. |
| 27 | 88 Walker Street | | 181 (594) | 47 | 2023 | 86-88 Walker Street North Sydney 33°50′19″N 151°12′31″E | Commercial | Tallest building in North Sydney. Completed in August 2023 |
| 28 | Grosvenor Place | | 180 (590) | 45 | 1988 | 225 George Street CBD 33°51′46″S 151°12′26″E | Commercial | Designed by Harry Seidler. |
| 29 | International Tower 2 | | 178 (584) | 43 | 2015 | 200 Barangaroo Avenue Barangaroo 33°51′52″S 151°12′08″E | Commercial | Designed by Rogers Stirk Harbour + Partners. |
| 30 | Altitude West Tower | | 177 (581) | 55 | 2017 | 330 Church Street Parramatta 33°48′41″S 151°00′16″E | Residential | |
| 31 | 1 Elizabeth | | 174 (571) | 38 | 2024 | 1 Elizabeth Street CBD 33°52′00″S 151°12′37″E | Commercial | Designed by Johnson Pilton Walker |
| 32 | Capita Centre | | 173 (568) | 31 | 1989 | 9 Castlereagh Street CBD 33°52′00″S 151°12′35″E | Commercial | Designed by Harry Seidler. |
| =33 | Victoria Cross Tower | | 170 (560) | 40 | 2025 | 189 Miller Street North Sydney 33°50′14″S 151°12′27″E | Commercial | Topped out core in November 2024 |
| =33 | Australia Square Tower | | 170 (560) | 46 | 1967 | 264 George Street CBD 33°51′54″S 151°12′28″E | Commercial | Tallest building in Sydney from 1967 to 1976. Designed by Harry Seidler. |
| =33 | Meriton Tower | | 170 (560) | 48 | 2006 | 551 George Street CBD 33°52′33″S 151°12′21″E | Residential | Designed by Harry Seidler. |
| =33 | Metro Grand Residences | | 170 (560) | 40 | 2014 | 438 Victoria Avenue Chatswood 33°47′49″S 151°10′53″E | Residential | |
| =37 | The Peak | | 168 (551) | 46 | 1996 | 2 Quay Street Haymarket 33°52′49″S 151°12′11″E | Residential | Tallest residential building in Sydney from 1996 to 1997. Part of the Market City complex. |
| =37 | International Tower 3 | | 168 (551) | 40 | 2016 | 300 Barangaroo Avenue Barangaroo 33°51′54″S 151°12′08″E | Commercial | Designed by Rogers Stirk Harbour + Partners. |
| =37 | Chifley South | | 168 (551) | 40 | 2027 | 2 Chifley Square CBD33°51′58″S 151°12′42″E | Commercial | Topped out in August 2026 |
| 39 | Harbourside Residences | | 167 (548) | 50 | 2026 | 2-10 Darling Drive Darling Harbour33°52′18″S 151°11′56″E | Mixed use | Topped out in July 2026 |
| =41 | 1 O'Connell Street | | 166 (545) | 36 | 1991 | 1 O'Connell Street CBD 33°51′52″S 151°12′36″E | Commercial | Designed by Peddle Thorp & Walker. |
| =41 | Westpac Place | | 166 (545) | 35 | 2005 | 275 Kent Street CBD 33°51′58″S 151°12′14″E | Commercial | Designed by Johnson Pilton Walker |
| 43 | 201 Elizabeth Street | | 165 (541) | 40 | 1978 | 201 Elizabeth Street CBD 33°52′25″S 151°12′34″E | Commercial | Formerly known as the Pacific Power Building. |
| 44 | Gateway Plaza | | 164 (538) | 46 | 1989 | 1 Macquarie Place CBD 33°51′43″S 151°12′35″E | Commercial | Designed by Peddle Thorp & Walker. |
| 45 | HSBC Centre | | 162 (531) | 37 | 1988 | 580 George Street CBD 33°52′30″S 151°12′25″E | Commercial | Formerly known as The Pavilion Building. |
| 46 | 1 Denison Street | | 159 (522) | 48 | 2020 | 1 Denison Street North Sydney 33°50′18″S 151°12′29″E | Commercial | Topped out in December 2019. Completed in August 2020 |
| =47 | The Cove | | 158 (518) | 45 | 2003 | 129 Harrington Street North Sydney 33°51′45″S 151°12′23″E | Residential | Designed by Harry Seidler. |
| =47 | 4 Parramatta Square | | 158 (518) | 39 | 2020 | 4 Parramatta Square Parramatta 33°49′00″S 151°00′17″E | Commercial | Topped out in July 2019. Completed in early 2020 |
| =47 | Paramount on Parkes | | 158 (518) | 47 | 2024 | 14-20 Parkes Street Harris Park 33°49′07″S 151°00′35″E | Residential | Structurally topped out in March 2024 |
| =50 | 88 by JQZ | | 157 (515) | 49 | 2022 | 88 Christie Street St Leonards 33°49′26″S 151°11′43″E | Residential | |
| =50 | 34 Walker Street (Tower 1) | | 157 (515) | 45 | 2024 | 34 Walker Street Rhodes 33°49′44″S 151°05′12″E | Residential | Tallest building in Rhodes |
| =52 | HOME Parramatta | | 156 (512) | 48 | 2025 | 116 Macquarie Street Parramatta 33°48′57″S 151°00′31″E | Residential | |
| =52 | Hordern Towers | | 156 (512) | 48 | 1999 | 401 Pitt Street CBD 33°52′38″S 151°12′27″E | Residential | Part of the World Square Complex. |
| =54 | Parkline Place | | 155 (509) | 39 | 2024 | 175-185 Castlereagh Street CBD 33°52′22″S 151°12′31″E | Commercial | |
| =54 | EY Centre | | 155 (509) | 40 | 2015 | 200 George Street CBD 33°51′45″S 151°12′28″E | Commercial | Designed by Francis-Jones Morehen Thorp. |
| =54 | Metro Spire Residences | | 155 (509) | 37 | 2014 | 440 Victoria Avenue Chatswood 33°47′51″S 151°10′51″E | Residential | |
| =57 | 100 Mount Street | | 152 (499) | 39 | 2019 | 100 Mount Street North Sydney 33°50′20″S 151°12′31″E | Commercial | Completed in June 2019 |
| =57 | Angel Place | | 152 (499) | 35 | 2000 | 123 Pitt Street CBD 33°52′01″S 151°12′30″E | Commercial | Designed by Peddle Thorp & Walker. |
| =57 | Sydney Central | | 152 (499) | 31 | 1992 | 477 Pitt Street CBD 33°52′51″S 151°12′22″E | Commercial | |
| =57 | Trilogy -Tower A | | 152 (499) | 46 | 2025 | 112 Talavera Road Macquarie Park 33°46′26″S 151°07′13″E | Residential | |
| =57 | The Lennox | | 152 (499) | 43 | 2021 | 333 Church Street Parramatta 33°48′41″S 151°00′13″E | Residential | |
| =62 | 85 Castlereagh Street | | 151 (495) | 32 | 2011 | 85 Castlereagh Street CBD 33°52′12″S 151°12′33″E | Commercial | Part of the Sydney Tower complex. Also known as the JP Morgan building. Designed by John Wardle Architects. |
| =62 | Lumière Residences | | 151 (495) | 47 | 2007 | 487 George Street CBD 33°52′29″S 151°12′23″E | Residential | Designed by Norman Foster. |

== Skylines ==
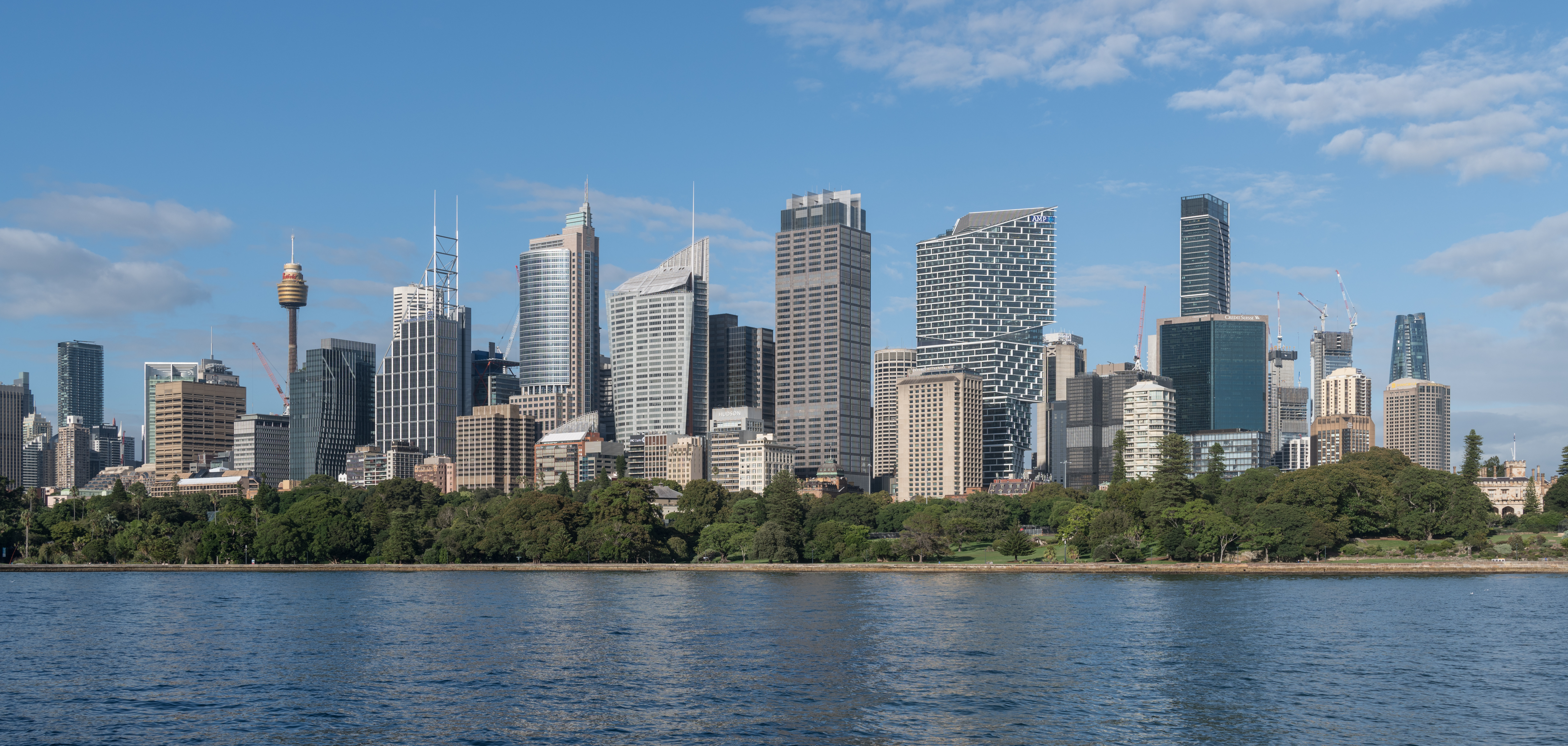
Sydney CBD
150m +
Completed/Topped out: 35
Under construction: 6
Tallest building: Salesforce Tower (Sydney) (263m)

Barangaroo
150m +
Completed/Topped out: 6
Tallest building: Crown Sydney (271m)

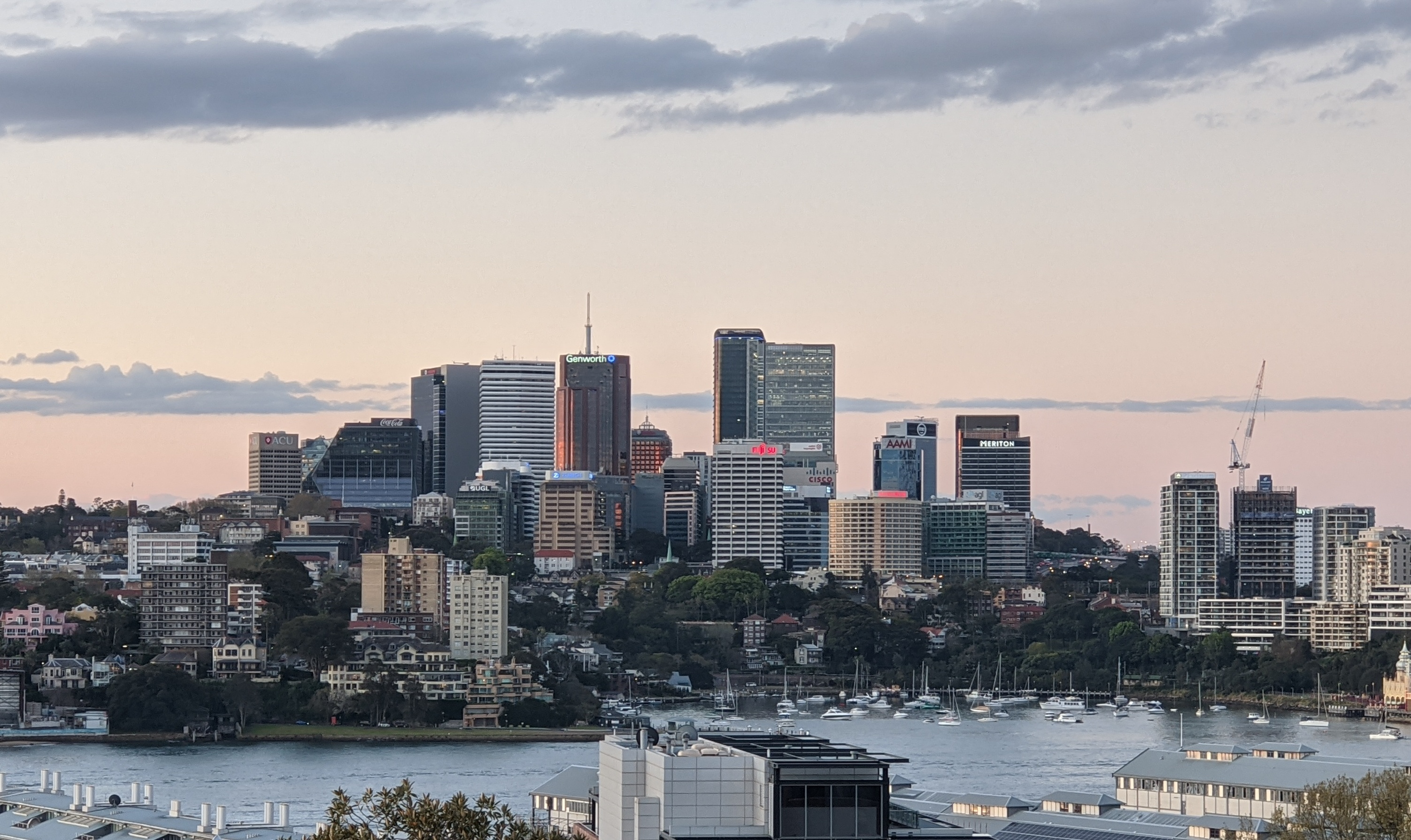
North Sydney
150m+
Completed/Topped out: 5
Tallest building: 86-88 Walker Street (181m)

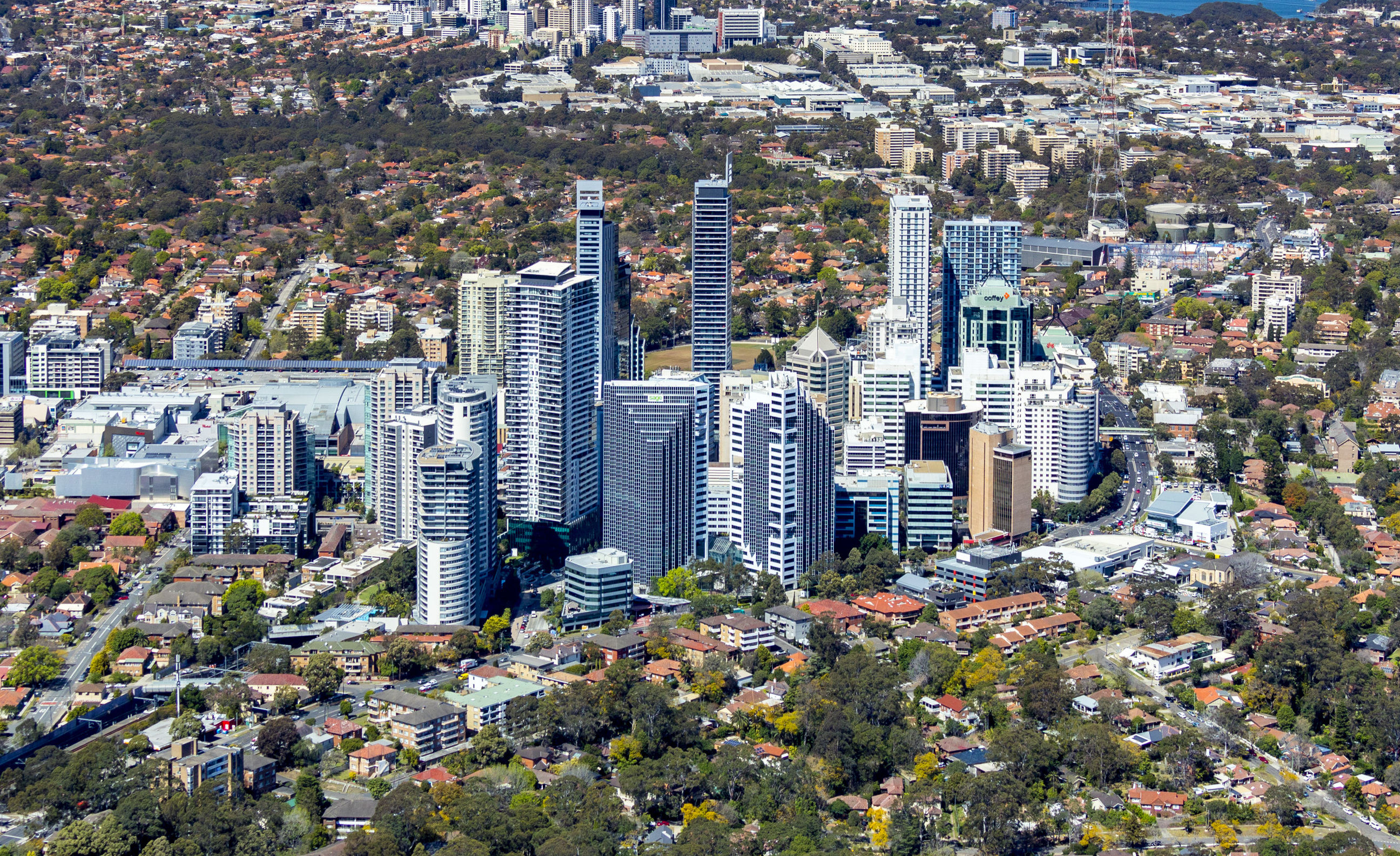
Chatswood
150m+
Completed/Topped out: 2
Under construction: 3
Tallest building: Metro Grand Residences (170m)

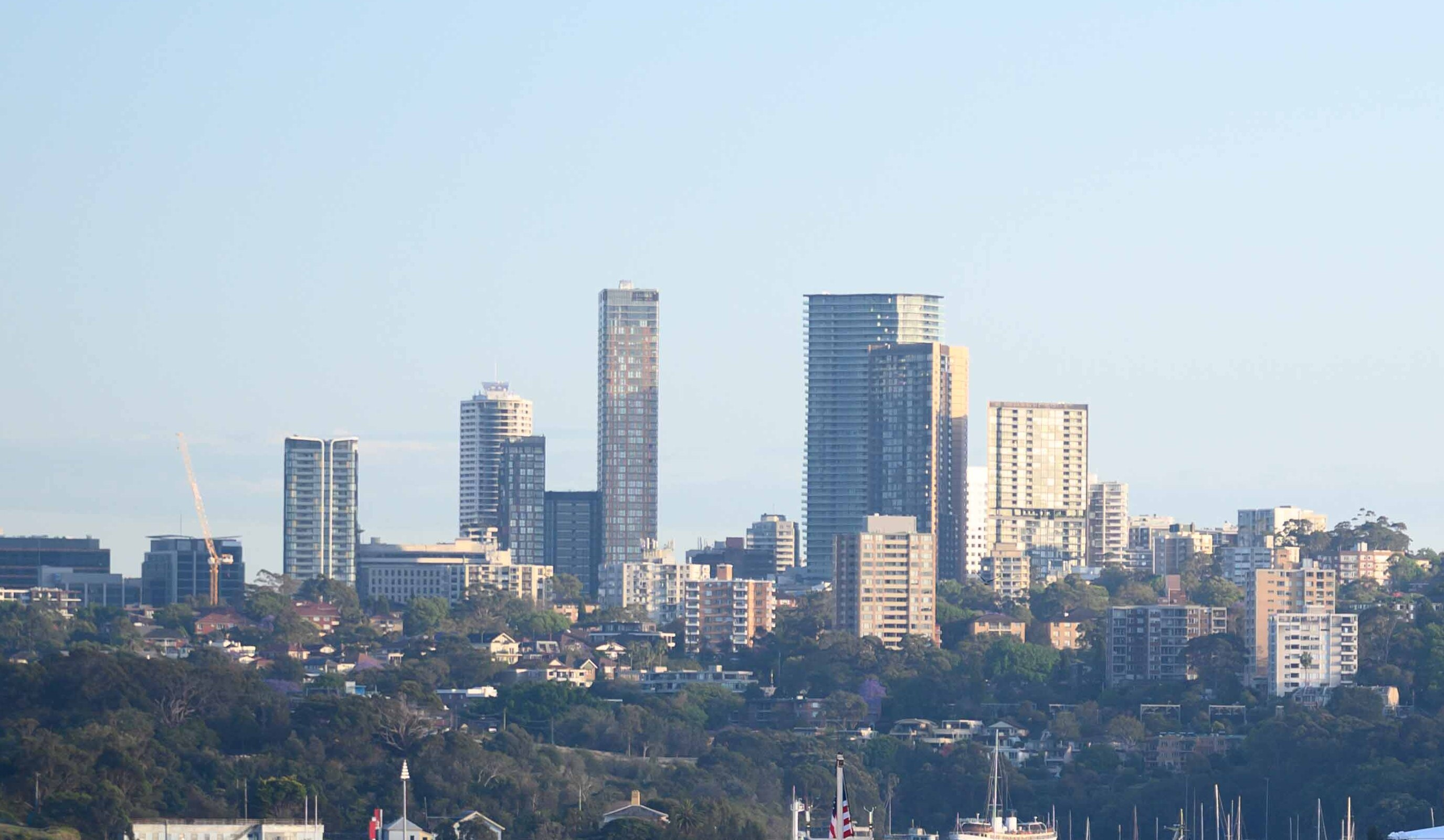
St Leonards
150m+
Completed/Topped out: 1
Under construction: 1
Tallest building: 88 by JQZ (157m)

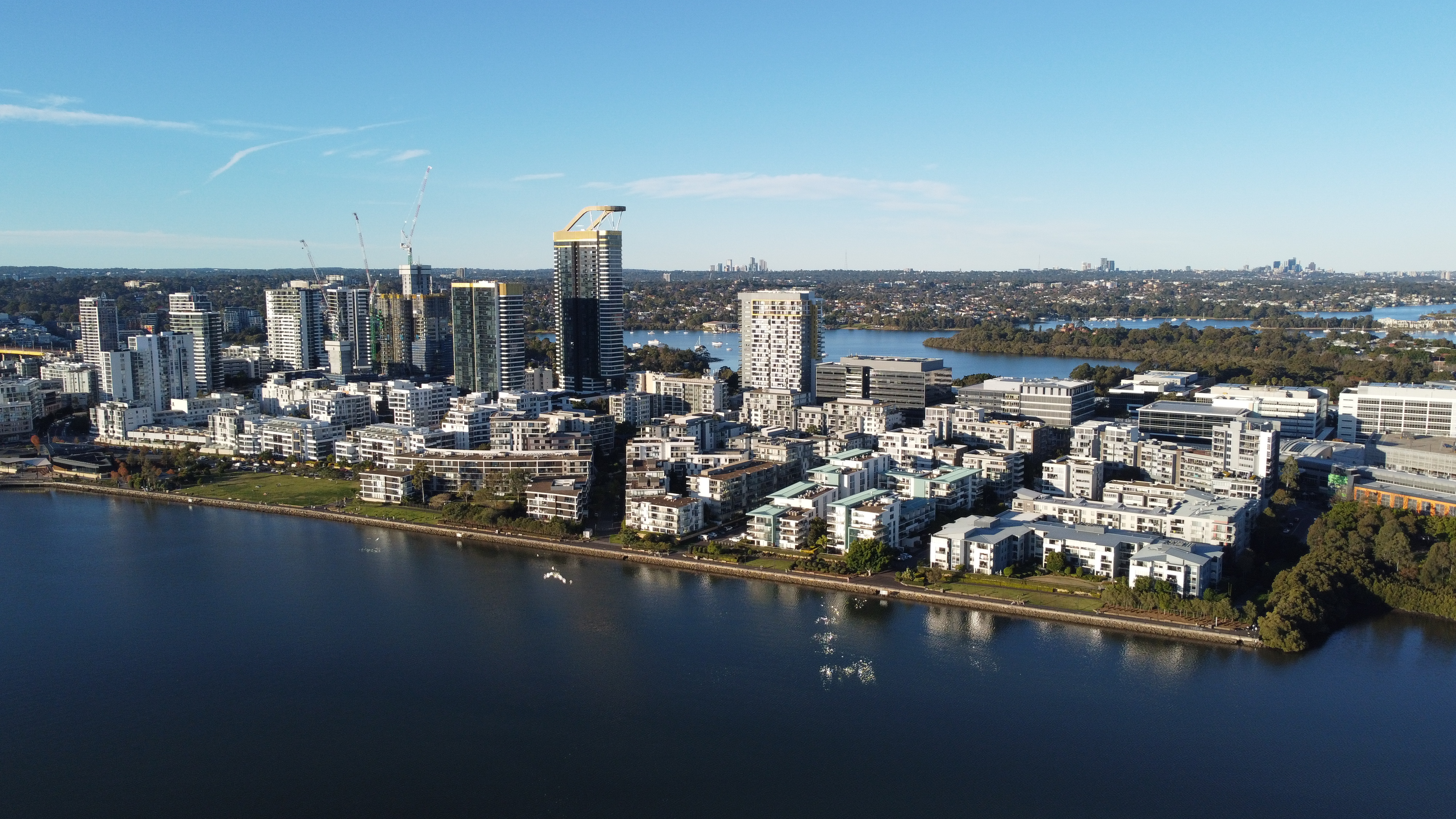
Rhodes
150m +
Completed/Topped out: 1
Tallest building: 34 Walker Street (157m)

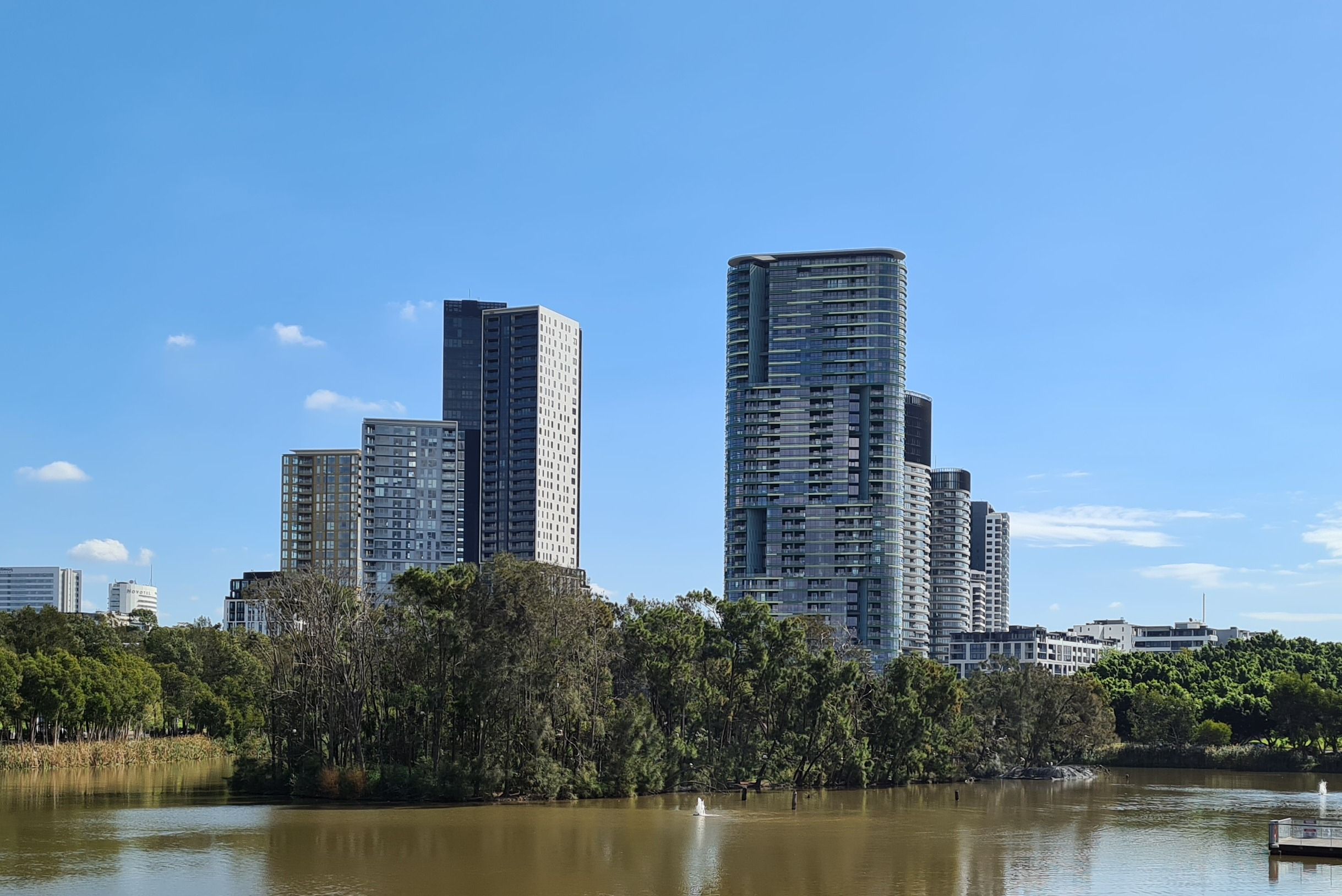
Sydney Olympic Park
100m +
Completed/Topped out: 3
Tallest building: Boomerang on Olympic Boulevard (126m)

== Tallest under construction or approved ==
This is a list of 150m+ approved and under construction skyscrapers in Sydney.

Key:
| Topped out | Under construction | Approved |

| Name | Height | | Storeys | Purpose | Completion | Location | Status |
| Name | m | ft | Storeys | Purpose | Completion | Location | Status |
|---|---|---|---|---|---|---|---|
| Pitt & Bridge | 305 | 1,001 | 70 | Commercial | TBA | Sydney CBD | Approved |
| 505 George Street | 282 | 925 | 80 | Residential | TBA | Sydney CBD | Approved |
| Castlereagh Place North Tower | 267 | 876 | 82 | Mixed use | 2030 | Sydney CBD | Under construction |
| Castlereagh Place South Tower | 267 | 876 | 82 | Mixed use | 2030 | Sydney CBD | Under construction |
| Hunter Street East Metro Tower | 258 | 846 | 58 | Commercial | TBA | Sydney CBD | Approved |
| 55 Pitt Street | 238 | 781 | 56 | Commercial | 2026 | Sydney CBD | Topped out |
| Burramatta Place | 235 | 771 | 57 | Commercial | TBA | Parramatta | Approved |
| 2 O'Connell Street | 217 | 712 | 66 | Residential | TBA | Parramatta | Approved |
| 15-25 Hunter Street | 215 | 705 | 52 | Commercial | TBA | Sydney CBD | Under construction |
| Affinity Place | 214 | 702 | 55 | Commercial | TBA | North Sydney | Approved |
| Hunter Street West Metro Tower | 211 | 692 | 51 | Commercial | TBA | Sydney CBD | Approved |
| Westfield Tower | 210 | 690 | 46 | Mixed use | TBA | Parramatta | Approved |
| 4-6 Bligh Street | 205 | 673 | 55 | Mixed use | TBA | Sydney CBD | Approved |
| Hyde Metropolitan | 196 | 643 | 55 | Mixed use | 2028 | Sydney CBD | Under construction |
| 372 Pitt Street | 190 | 620 | 60 | Mixed use | TBA | Sydney CBD | Under construction |
| Toga Central | 186 | 610 | 45 | Commercial | TBA | Sydney CBD | Approved |
| 201 Elizabeth Street | 185 | 607 | 55 | Mixed use | TBA | Sydney CBD | Approved |
| 100 Walker Street | 185 | 607 | 45 | Commercial | TBA | North Sydney | Approved |
| Atlassian Central | 183 | 600 | 36 | Commercial | 2027 | Sydney CBD | Topped out |
| 617-621 Pacific Highway | 182 | 597 | 50 | Mixed use | TBA | St Leonards | Approved |
| GQ Parramatta | 181 | 594 | 54 | Residential | TBA | Parramatta | Approved |
| Cockle Bay Park | 181 | 594 | 46 | Commercial | TBA | Darling Harbour | Approved |
| Chifley South | 168 | 551 | 44 | Commercial | 2027 | Sydney CBD | Topped out |
| Sydney House | 168 | 551 | 48 | Mixed use | 2026 | Sydney CBD | Under construction |
| Harbourside Residences | 167 | 548 | 50 | Residential | 2026 | Darling Harbour | Topped out |
| 135 George Street | 166 | 545 | 51 | Mixed use | TBA | Parramatta | Approved |
| 133-145 Castlereagh Street | 165 | 541 | 37 | Commercial | TBA | Sydney CBD | Approved |
| Chatswood Grand Residences (Tower 1) | 165 | 541 | 46 | Residential | 2031 | Chatswood | Under construction |
| Chatswood Grand Residences (Tower 2) | 165 | 541 | 46 | Residential | 2031 | Chatswood | Under construction |
| Burwood Place (Tower B) | 161 | 528 | 46 | Residential | TBA | Burwood | Under construction |
| 525 George Street | 160 | 520 | 40 | Mixed use | TBA | Sydney CBD | Approved |
| East Plaza | 159 | 522 | 46 | Residential | TBA | Sydney Olympic Park | Approved |
| 9-13 Blaxland Road | 159 | 522 | 48 | Mixed use | TBA | Rhodes | Approved |
| Burwood Place (Tower C) | 156 | 512 | 47 | Residential | TBA | Burwood | Under construction |
| 146 Arthur Street | 155 | 509 | 46 | Residential | TBA | North Sydney | Approved |
| Burwood Place (Tower A) | 155 | 509 | 46 | Residential | TBA | Burwood | Under construction |
| 524-542 Pacific Hwy | 154 | 505 | 42 | Mixed use | TBA | St Leonards | Under construction |
| Cosmopolitan (Tower 1) | 154 | 505 | 46 | Mixed use | TBA | Parramatta | Under construction |
| 81 George Street | 154 | 505 | 37 | Commercial | TBA | Parramatta | Approved |
| The Sky Residences (Building B) | 153 | 502 | 48 | Residential | TBA | Macquarie Park | Under construction |
| Novus on Victoria | 152 | 499 | 46 | Residential | 2029 | Chatswood | Under construction |
| Cosmopolitan (Tower 2) | 151 | 495 | 46 | Mixed use | TBA | Parramatta | Under construction |
| The Sky Residences (Building A) | 150 | 490 | 47 | Residential | TBA | Macquarie Park | Under construction |
| 2 Fitzwilliam Street | 150 | 490 | 48 | Residential | TBA | Parramatta | Approved |

== Timeline of tallest buildings ==
This list includes buildings that once stood as tallest in Sydney.

| Name | Image | Years as tallest | Height | Floors | Notes |
|---|---|---|---|---|---|
| Hunter Clock Tower | | 1797–1806 | 45 m (148 ft) | – | Collapsed in 1806. Site of Old St Philip's Church. |
| Government Windmill | | 1806–1809 | 12 m (39 ft) | – | Demolished in the 1850s for the Sydney Observatory. |
| Old St Philip's Church | | 1809–1812 | 15 m (49 ft) | 4 | Demolished in 1856. |
| Commissariat Stores | | 1812–1824 | 18 m (59 ft) | 4 | Demolished in 1939. |
| St James' Church | | 1824–1875 | 52 m (171 ft) | – | Tallest building in Australia (1824–1875). Sydney's earliest tallest building still in existence. |
| Town Hall | | 1878–1879 | 57 m (187 ft) | 4 | Tallest building in Australia (1878–1879) |
| Garden Palace | | 1879–1882 | 64 m (210 ft) | 2 | Destroyed by fire in 1882. Tallest building in Australia (1879–1882). |
| Town Hall | | 1882–1891 | 57 m (187 ft) | 4 | Tallest building in Australia (1882–1891) |
| General Post Office | | 1891–1932 | 73 m (240 ft) | 5 | Tallest building in Australia (1891–1932) |
| AWA Tower | | 1939–1962 | 112 m (367 ft) | 14 | |
| AMP Building | | 1962–1965 | 115 m (377 ft) | 26 | |
| State Office Block | | 1965–1967 | 128 m (420 ft) | 38 | Demolished in 1997 to make way for Aurora Place. Tallest building ever to have been demolished in Sydney. |
| Australia Square Tower | | 1967–1976 | 170 m (560 ft) | 46 | |
| AMP Centre | | 1976–1977 | 188 m (617 ft) | 45 | Redeveloped into the Quay Quarter Tower (216m) from 2018 to 2021. |
| 25 Martin Place | | 1977–1992 | 228 m (748 ft) | 60 | |
| Chifley Tower | | 1992–2020 | 244 m (801 ft) | 50 | 15th-tallest building in Australia. |
| Crown Sydney | | 2020–present | 271 m (889 ft) | 75 | Tallest building in Sydney 2020–present; 4th-tallest building in Australia. |

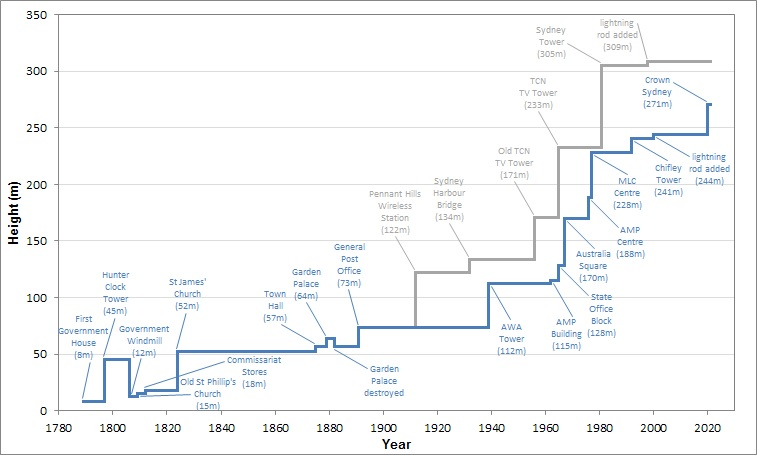
Sydney's tallest building (blue) and tallest structure (grey) from 1789 to 2021.

== See also ==
- List of tallest buildings in Chatswood
- List of tallest structures in Australia
- List of tallest buildings in Oceania
