= Deutsche Bank Building (disambiguation) =

Deutsche Bank Building was an office skyscraper located at 130 Liberty Street in Manhattan, New York City.

Deutsche Bank Building may also refer to:

- Deutsche Bank Center, in New York City, the American headquarters of Deutsche Bank since 2021
- 60 Wall Street, in New York City, the American headquarters of Deutsche Bank from 2001 to 2021
- Deutsche Bank Place, in Sydney
- Deutsche Bank Twin Towers, in Frankfurt
