= Pitt & Bridge =

Proposed skyscraper in New South Wales, Australia

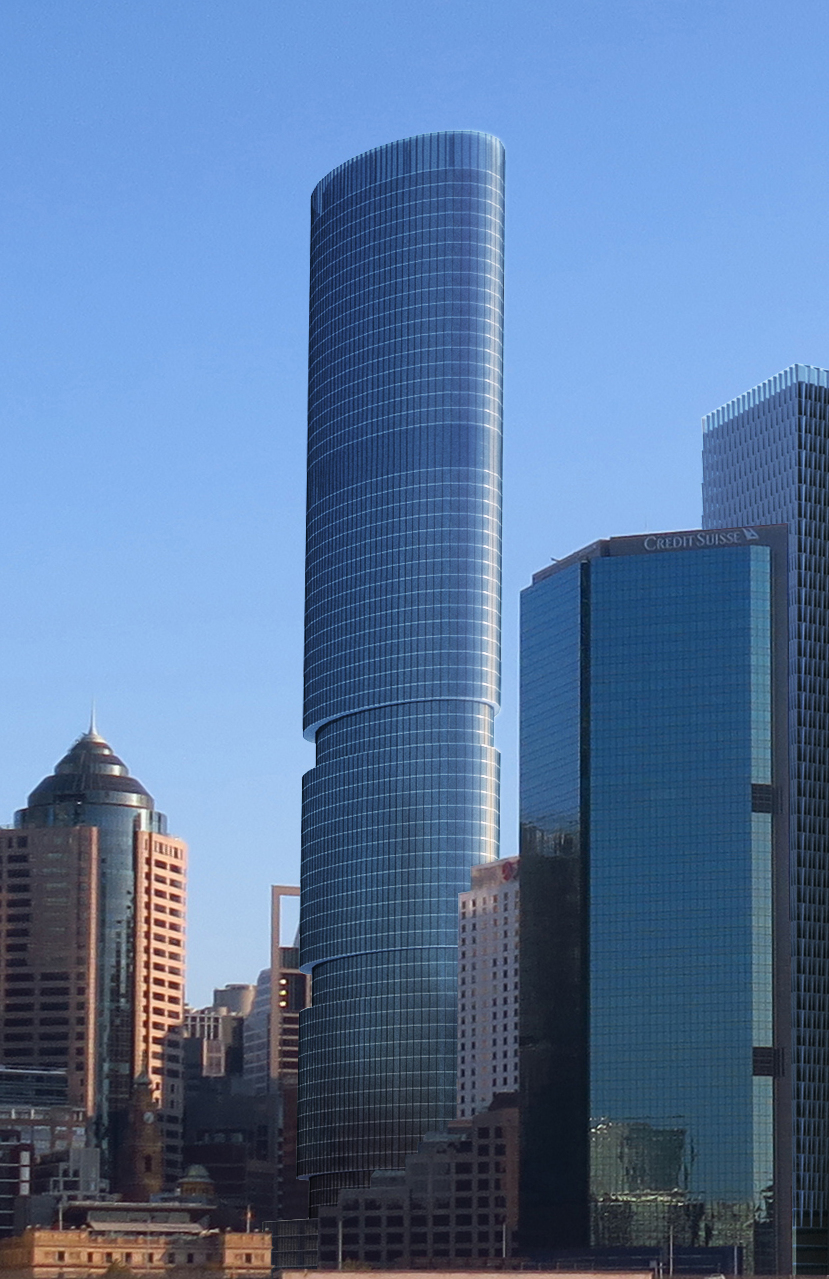
- Concept render
- Alternative names: 56 Pitt Street

General information
- Status: Approved
- Type: Office
- Location: Sydney, Australia, 56-60 Pitt Street, Sydney NSW 2000
- Coordinates: 33.86393°S 151.208997°E
- Estimated completion: ~2032
- Cost: A$3.1 billion

Height
- Height: 305 metres (1,001 ft)

Technical details
- Floor count: 70

Design and construction
- Architecture firm: TBA
- Developer: Dexus

Pitt & Bridge, also known as 56 Pitt Street, is a proposed skyscraper development in Sydney, New South Wales, Australia. With a planned height of 305 metres (1001 ft) and 70 floors, the building would become the tallest building in Sydney and would be the first of its kind in the city to exceed a height of 300 metres if completed. The development was initially proposed by property developer and investment company Dexus in November 2019, and will occupy a city block bounded by Pitt Street, Bridge Street, Gresham Street and Spring Street, in the northern end of Sydney's central business district With government incentives, revised height restrictions and speculative proposals, the development has the potential to reach a further height of approximately 330 metres (1,083 ft), which could possibly make it the future tallest building in Australia.

== Planning and approval ==
In mid 2019, Dexus acquired and amalgamated properties on the proposed site of the project for approximately A$190 million and has since committed A$3.1 billion to the project. The tower will comprise a floor area of approximately 93,400 square metres (1,005,000 sq ft) of commercial office space.

In June 2025, the City of Sydney council unanimously approved the development and endorsed the tower's 305 metre height as part of the Central Sydney Planning Strategy. Following this decision, the tower will undergo a design competition to finalise its design and facade.

== See also ==
- List of tallest buildings in Sydney
