= Hyde Metropolitan =

Mixed use building in Sydney, Australia

Hyde Metropolitan 133 Liverpool Street
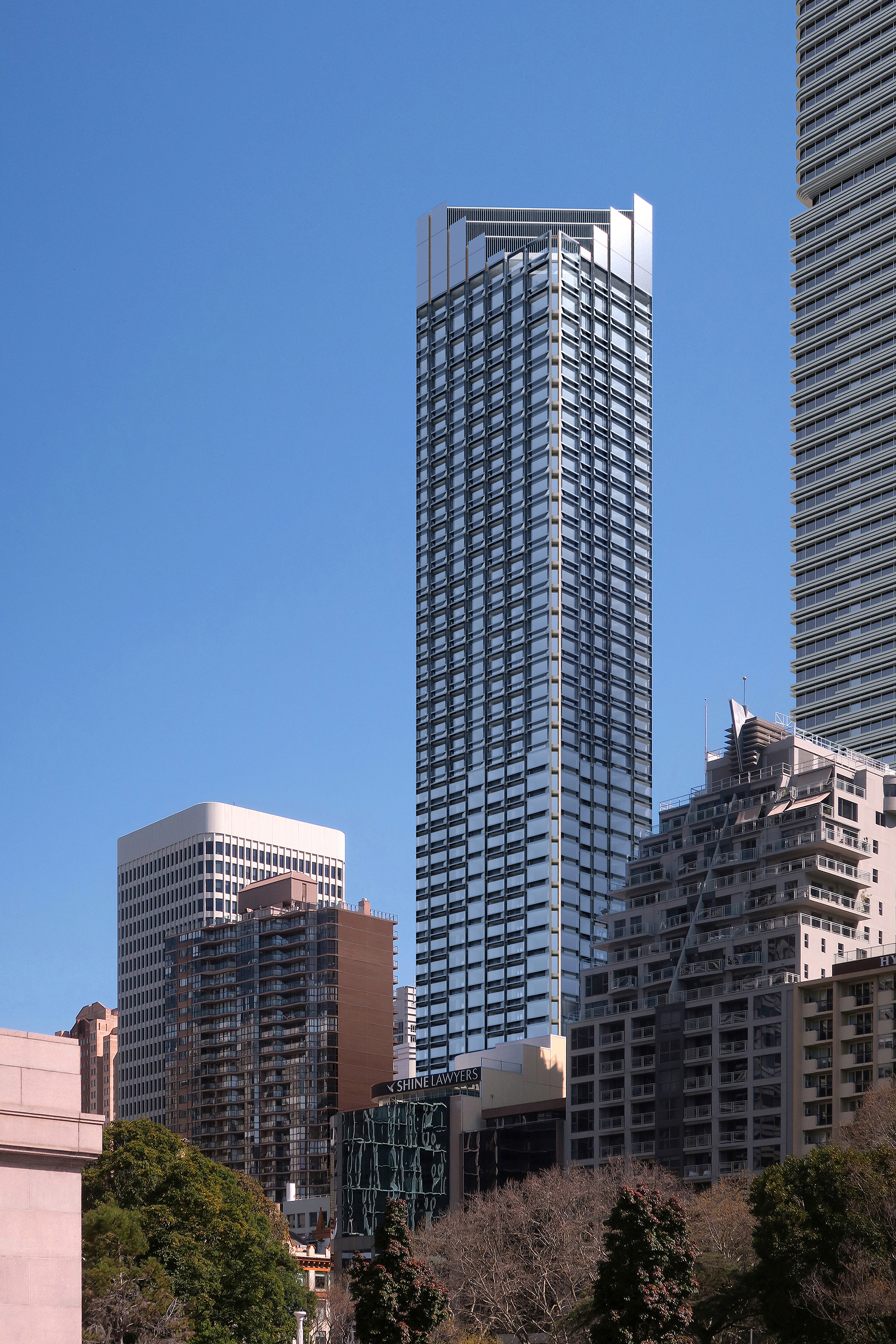
- Artist's impression

General information
- Status: Under construction
- Type: Mixed use
- Location: 133-141 Liverpool Street, Sydney, NSW 2000, Sydney, Australia
- Construction started: 2025
- Owner: Deicorp

Height
- Height: 200 metres (660 ft)

Technical details
- Floor count: 51

Design and construction
- Architect: Candalepas Associates
- Developer: Deicorp

Website
- https://hydemetropolitan.com.au/

Hyde Metropolitan is a mixed-use skyscraper currently under construction in Sydney, Australia, located at 133 Liverpool Street in the Central Business District. The 51-storey, 200m tall building is being designed by Candalepas Associates and developed by Deicorp. The tower will contain 168 apartments atop a podium containing a six-storey hotel and retail tenancies, topped by communal recreational spaces.

== Site history and construction ==
=== Planning history ===
The building takes the place of the Polding Centre, built in 1977 for use by Commonwealth Bank to house an electronic data centre and last owned and occupied by the Catholic Archdiocese of Sydney prior to its redevelopment. The Archdiocese submitted a planning proposal to the City of Sydney in 2018 for a 70-storey, 234m tall residential tower replacing the Polding Centre, which was approved in 2020. After Deicorp's purchase of the development in 2021 for over $200 million, Deicorp filed new plans in 2022 proposing a 55-storey mixed-use skyscraper designed by Candalepas Associates containing 168 apartments and four levels of commercial space, estimated to cost $700 million. The design was amended in 2025 to include a 4,180m² hotel that spans the first six levels of the building, as well as 654m² of retail spaces across the ground floor and level six.

=== Construction ===
The Catholic Archdiocese of Sydney vacated the Polding Centre in March 2023, and demolition of the building commenced late that year. Demolition was completed by July 2025, at which time excavation commenced for the new building's 6 basement levels. Deicorp expects excavation to be complete by November 2025, allowing for construction of the main structure to begin.

== See also ==
- List of tallest buildings in Sydney
