= Century Tower (Sydney) =

Residential apartment building in Sydney, Australia

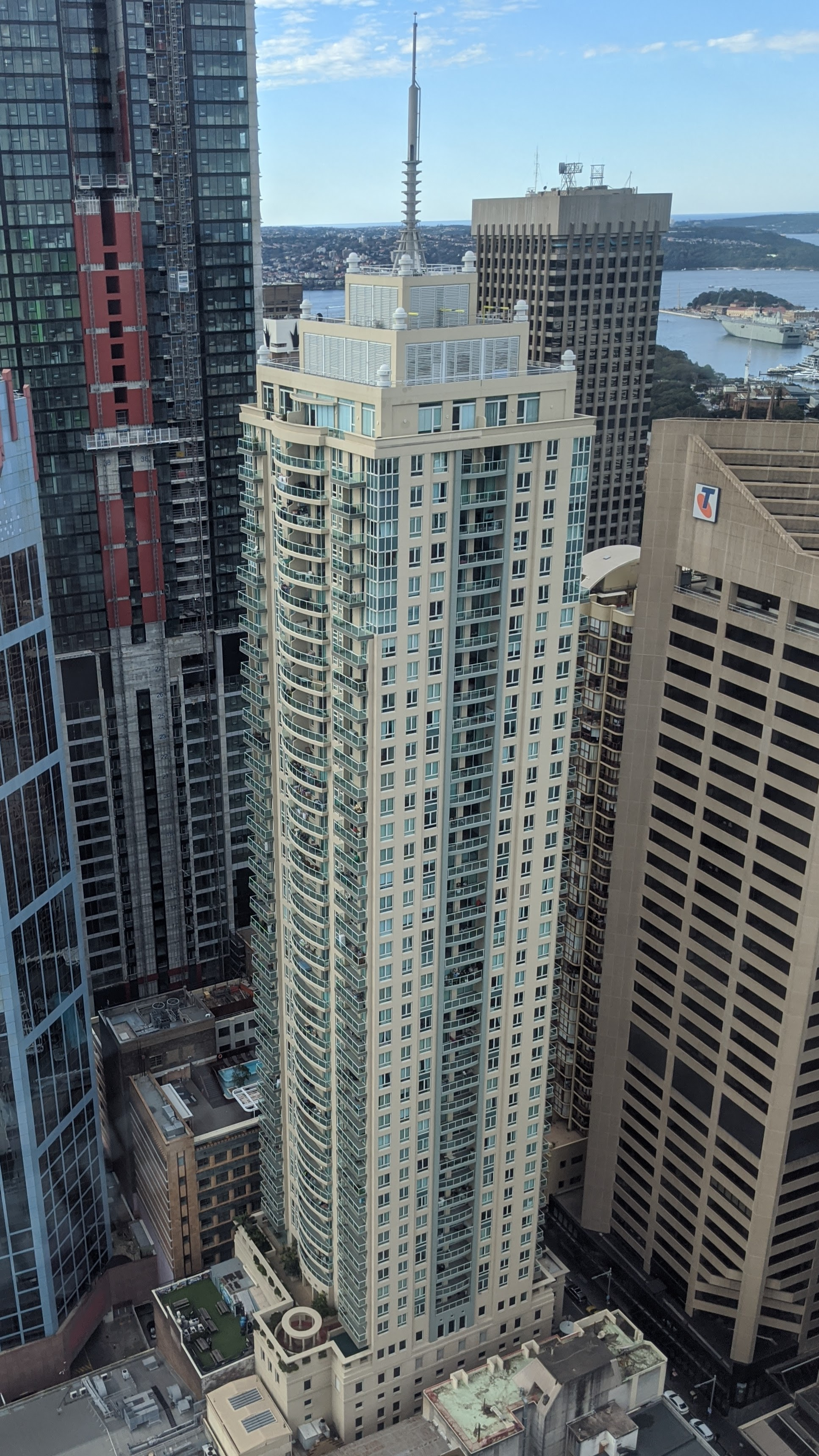
- Century Tower
- Interactive map of the Century Tower area

General information
- Type: Commercial
- Location: Sydney central business district, 343-357 Pitt Street, Sydney, New South Wales, Australia
- Coordinates: 33°52′32.2″S 151°12′28.8″E
- Opening: 1997
- Owner: Lendlease

Height
- Height: 183 metres (600 ft)

Technical details
- Floor count: 50

Design and construction
- Architecture firm: Brewster Murray
- Developer: Sunlord

Website
- www.centurytower.com.au

Century Tower is a residential apartment building in Sydney, New South Wales, Australia. Designed by Brewster Murray, it was completed in 1997 and held the title of Australia's tallest residential building until 2002 with a total height of 183 metres (600 ft). It is located on 343–357 Pitt Street, between Wilmot Street and Central Street in Sydney's CBD.

The facade of the former Lismore Hotel, which has existed since the early 20th century, is preserved at the north-eastern corner of the building. It is listed as a local heritage item. In addition to the hotel's interior, 4 other buildings on the site were demolished prior to the construction of Century Tower.

In 1998 a lightning rod was added to the top of the building.

== See also ==
- Skyscrapers in Sydney
