= Latitude (building) =

Skyscraper in Sydney, Australia

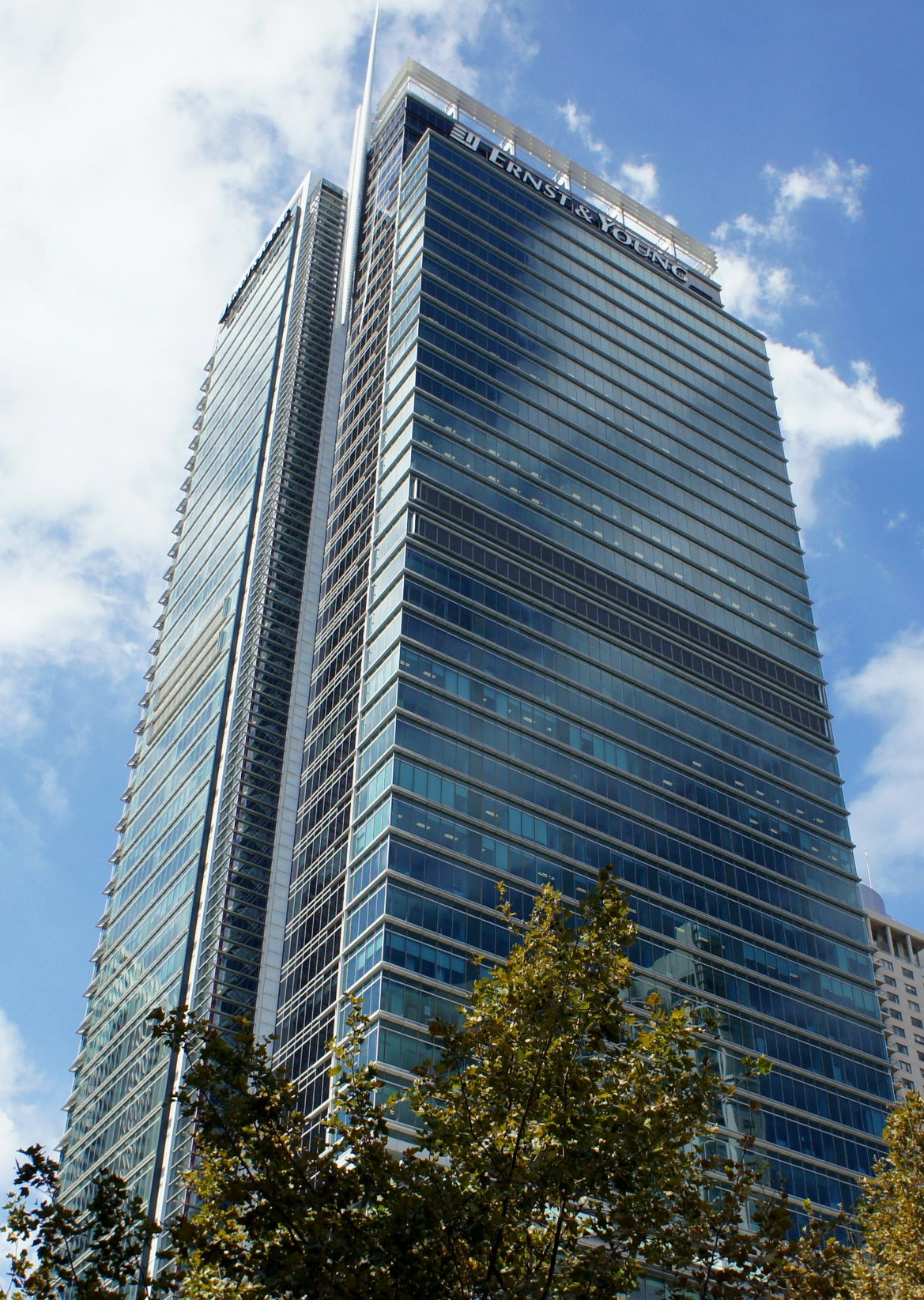
- Latitude viewed from street level
- Interactive map of the Latitude area
- Alternative names: Ernst and Young Centre

General information
- Status: Completed
- Type: Office
- Location: 680 George Street, Sydney, Australia
- Coordinates: 33.877°S 151.207°E
- Construction started: 2003
- Completed: December 2004
- Opening: January 2005

Height
- Height: 222 metres (728 ft)

Technical details
- Floor count: 51

Design and construction
- Architect: Greg Crone
- Developer: Multiplex

Website
- brookfield-public.mybuildings.com/Core/Content/Welcometo680GeorgeStreet,Sydney/Content13334.aspx
List of tallest buildings in Australia
| Next Shortest Circle on Cavill - North Tower; 220m | Next Tallest Governor Phillip Tower; 227m |
Heights are to highest architectural element.

Latitude (previously known as the "Ernst & Young Tower at Latitude") is a skyscraper in Sydney's CBD, part of the World Square complex bounded by George, Goulburn, Liverpool and Pitt Streets in Sydney, Australia. Designed by Greg Crone, Latitude stands at a height of 222 m (728 ft).

== Design and construction ==
The building comprises a low rise office, a retail complex incorporating a series of laneways and a high rise commercial tower. The 51 storey structure is 190 m in height and 222 m to the top of the spire. Its main tenant was Ernst & Young until 2017. The 51st floor is the headquarters for the Australian Health Practitioner Regulation Agency. The building also comprises the headquarters for Southern Cross Austereo, Hoyts, Reckitt Benckiser and Tabcorp Holdings.

The building was opened in January 2005. It was built by Multiplex.

The architect responsible for the design was Greg Crone, known for his work with King Street Wharf, Citigroup Centre and 400 George Street.

== See also ==
- Skyscrapers in Sydney
- List of tallest buildings in Australia
