= Sony Centre =

Sony Centre or Sony Center is a chain of stores in Europe that sells electrical goods made by manufacturer Sony. Sony Centres are not part of the Sony group; the name is used by a number of separate entities. The Sony brand and logo, and the Sony Centre name, are trademarks of Sony Corporation and used under licence. Many of their stores on Mainland Europe have been re-branded to Sony Centre after being called Sony Galleria.

== Countries ==
The Sony Centre has a number stores in the United Kingdom, Belgium, Switzerland, Poland, Latvia and Moldova.

There are also Sony Centres in Australia, with a notable one being at Sydney's World Square. In Norway, there were at most 10 stores, but this was reduced to just one in Lillestrøm in 2013. In Romania, the chain is named Sony Center and has seven stores of its own and two franchised stores.
