= 505 George Street, Sydney =

Australian residential skyscraper

505 George Street
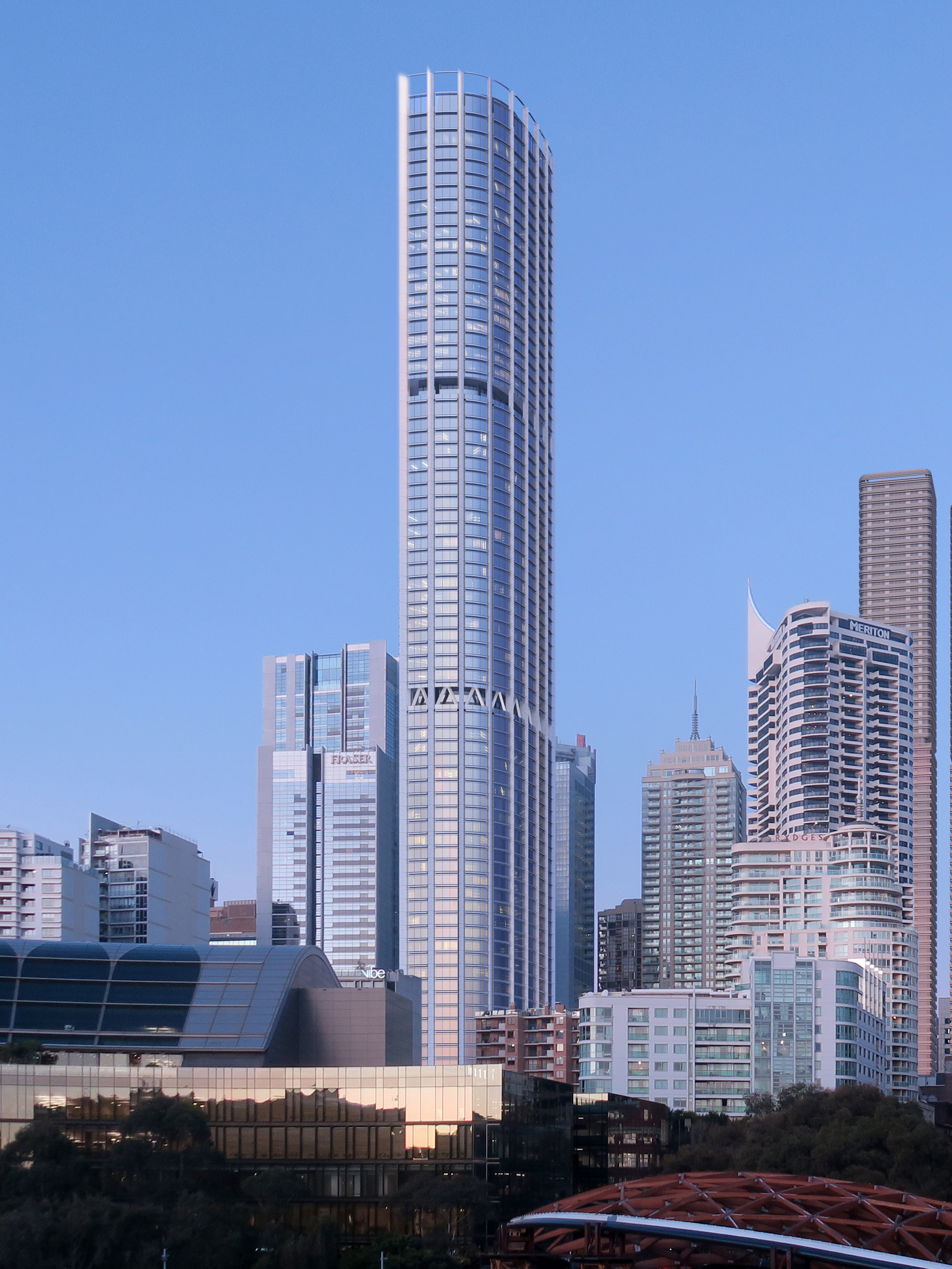

General information
- Status: Approved
- Location: Sydney central business district, 505 – 523 George Street, Sydney, Australia, Australia
- Estimated completion: 2028
- Cost: A$1 billion
- Owner: Michael Coombes

Height
- Height: 282 metres (925 ft)

Technical details
- Floor count: 81
- Floor area: 81,708 square metres (879,500 sq ft)
- Grounds: 4,308 square metres (46,370 sq ft)

Design and construction
- Architecture firm: Ingenhoven Architects; Architectus
- Developer: Coombes Property Group
- Structural engineer: Enstruct; Bonacci Group
- Main contractor: Mirvac Group
- Awards: 2019 MIPIM Architectural Review Future Project Award

505 George Street is a skyscraper that has been approved for construction in Sydney, Australia, on the current Event Cinemas site in George Street. It will be 282-metre (925 ft) tall, with 81-storeys and 507 apartments. It will also include a rooftop restaurant and bar. When finished, it will be the tallest residential building in the city. It is being designed by Ingenhoven Architects. Initial concepts for a tower on the site were first proposed in 2014 with the initial tower design reaching a height of approximately 263 metres. The winning design was selected from entries by five internationally acclaimed architectural firms, including Skidmore, Owings & Merrill in partnership with Crone, Wilkinson Eyre, Foster + Partners, FJMT, and Bates Smart. In May 2020, the City of Sydney granted final planning approval for the tower to go ahead. Demolition of the existing site is yet to be announced, furthering the current date of completion to be unknown for the time being.

== See also ==
- List of tallest buildings in Sydney
