= 338 Pitt Street =

- Artist's impression

General information
- Status: Under construction
- Type: Mixed use
- Location: Sydney, New South Wales, Australia
- Coordinates: 33.876387°S 151.208151°E
- Estimated completion: 2030

Height
- Height: 267 metres (876 ft)

Technical details
- Floor count: 82

Design and construction
- Architecture firm: Francis-Jones Morehen Thorp; Aileen Sage Architects; Polly Harbison Design; Trias Studio
- Developer: Billbergia Group; Metrics Credit Partners

338 Pitt Street or Castlereagh Place is a skyscraper complex currently under construction in Sydney, New South Wales, Australia, consisting of twin 82 storey towers designed by FJCstudio and lowrise buildings designed by Aileen Sage Architects, Polly Harbison Design, and Trias Studio. The complex will include a 209-room 4.5 star hotel and 607 apartments, as well as ground level retail. The properties comprising the 6,000 m^{2} site were acquired by Han's Holding Group over a five-year period beginning in 2015, and the initial proposal, comprising twin towers linked by a skybridge and six low-rise podium buildings, gained approval from the City of Sydney in March 2021. The site and its development approvals were sold to Billbergia Group and Metrics Credit Partners in January 2025. The new owners lodged amended plans for approval by the City of Sydney in July 2025, removing the skybridge from the proposal and reducing the scale of the hotel and retail components, as well as modestly increasing the number of apartments and the height of the towers. Billbergia Group and Metrics began early site works and demolition of the existing buildings on the site in 2026, with a targeted completion date of 2030.

== Architecture ==
The masterplan, led by FJCStudio, was chosen through a design competition held in 2018, winning against entries led by Zaha Hadid Architects, Kohn Pedersen Fox, Grimshaw, and Skidmore, Owings, and Merrill. The proposal calls for the twin 82 storey towers to be integrated into a network of laneways and plazas and surrounded by low-rise buildings facing the street in order to achieve a fine-grain precinct with a mix of retail and hotel uses. The Aileen Sage-designed building is a four-storey commercial building that flanks a laneway leading from Liverpool Street into the complex's central courtyard, featuring a masonry facade with arched entryways and an open internal staircase. The Polly Harbison-designed building is located on the corner of Pitt Street and Liverpool Street and the Trias-designed building is located adjacent on Pitt Street, both featuring retail spaces. The landscape design is led by Martha Schwartz Partners and FJMT Landscape and the retail spaces are to be designed by Jerde.

The existing buildings at 338 Pitt Street in September 2026

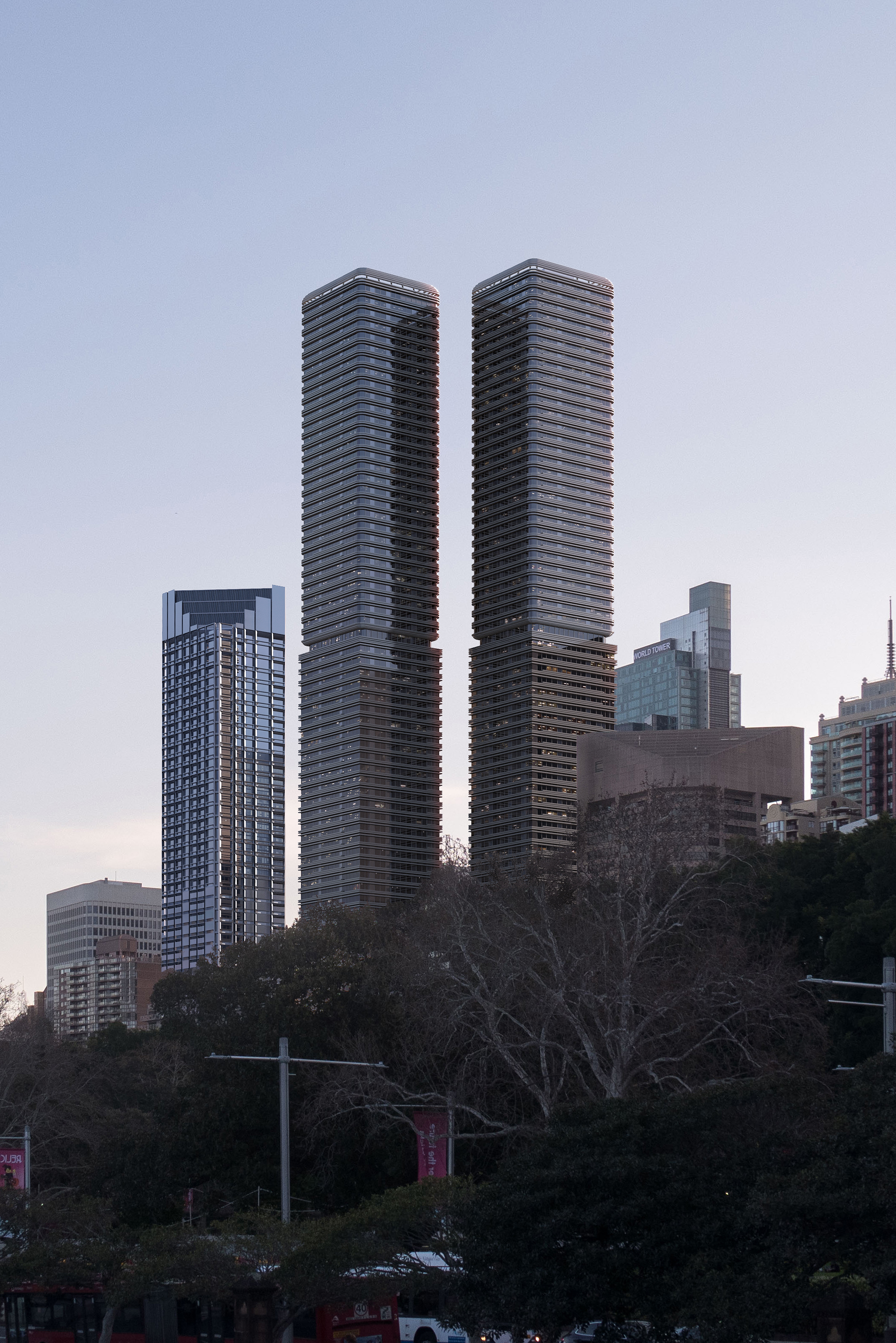
The twin residential towers viewed from Hyde Park

== See also ==
- List of tallest buildings in Sydney
