= List of tallest buildings in Chatswood =

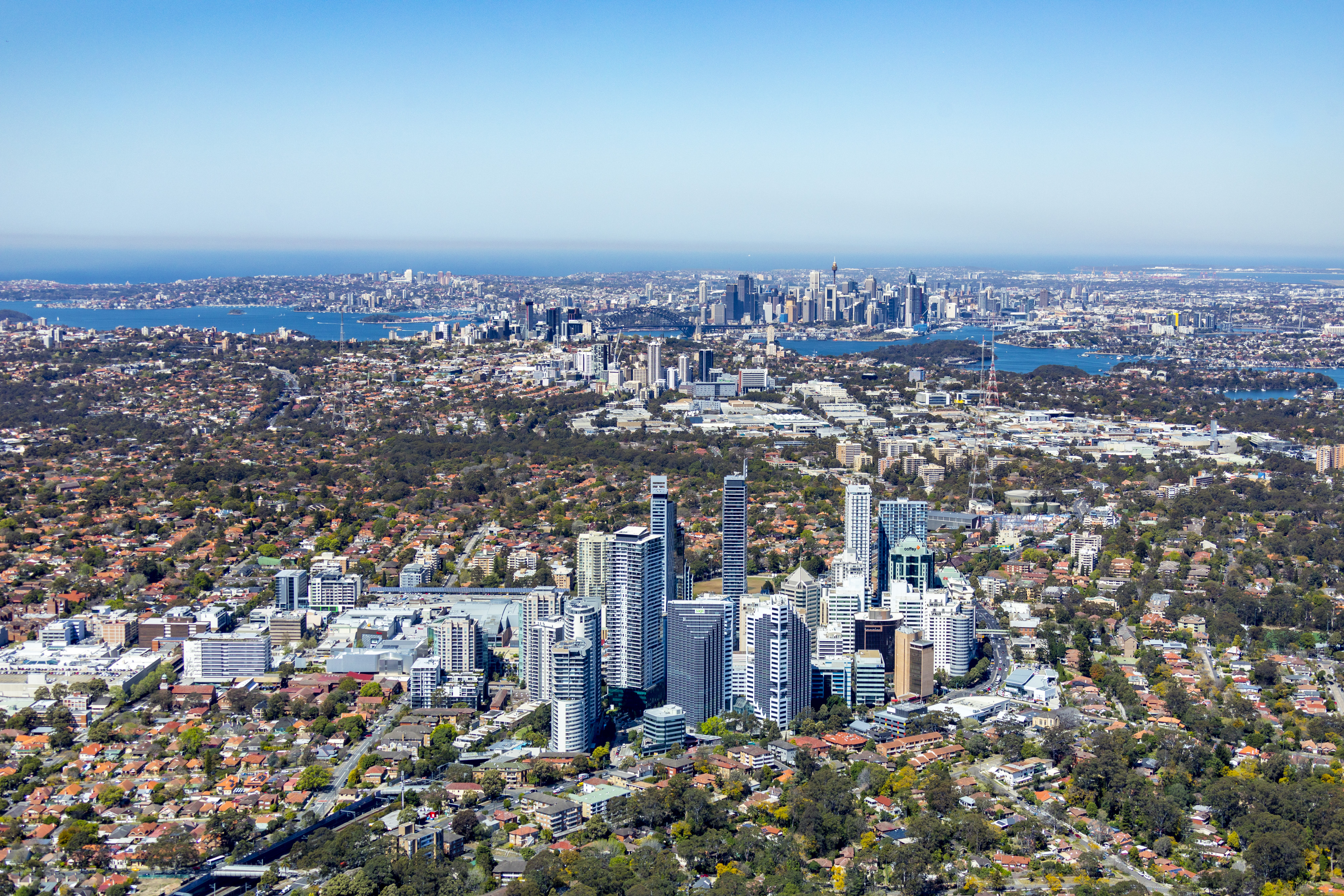
The Chatswood skyline in 2018.

These are lists of the tallest buildings in Chatswood, Sydney, New South Wales, Australia. In accordance with CTBUH guidelines, heights are measured to the structural height, which includes architectural elements, such as spires, but not communications antennas. Structures are not included.

== Tallest completed and topped out buildings ==
This is a list of the tallest buildings in Chatswood which are completed or topped out:

Rank	Name	Image	Height (m)	Floors	Built	Use
1	Metro Grand		170 (557.7 ft)	40	2014	Residential
2	Metro Spire		155 (508.5 ft)	36	2014	Residential
3	Era		136 (446.1 ft)	43	2013	Residential
4	Centrium Tower One		126 (413.3 ft)	38	2015	Residential
5	Citadel Tower 1		110 (360.8 ft)	21	1991	Office
=6	Centrium Tower Two		107 (351.0 ft)	33	2015	Residential
=6	Metro View		107 (351.0 ft)	27	2014	Residential
8	Epica		96 (314.9 ft)	33	2005	Residential
=9	Zenith Tower A		94 (308.3 ft)	24	1990	Office
=9	Zenith Tower B		94 (308.3 ft)	24	1990	Office

== See also ==
- List of tallest buildings in Sydney
- List of tallest buildings in Australia
- List of tallest buildings in Oceania
