= Hunter Street East Metro Tower =

- Interactive map of the Hunter Street East Metro Tower area

General information
- Status: Proposed
- Type: Mixed use
- Location: Sydney, New South Wales, Australia
- Coordinates: 33.865711°S 151.2096°E

Height
- Height: 258 metres (846 ft)

Technical details
- Floor count: 58

Hunter Street East Metro Tower is a proposed skyscraper in Sydney, New South Wales, Australia.

The building is an over-station development situated above the eastern entrance to the new Hunter Street railway station in Sydney’s CBD, forming part of the broader Sydney Metro City & Southwest and Sydney Metro West precinct redevelopment. The tower is expected to rise to approximately 258 metres (846 ft) and 58 floors in height.

Planning approvals for the Hunter Street over-station proposals were granted in 2024. The approved concept design calls for a high-rise commercial building delivering office and ground-level retail space for a maximum gross floor area of 84,223 square metres (906,570 sq ft) directly above the new underground station between O'Connell Street and Bligh Street.

== See also ==
- List of tallest buildings in Sydney
