= Sydney House =

- Interactive map of the Sydney House area

General information
- Location: Sydney, Australia
- Coordinates: 33.871147°S 151.208499°E

Sydney House is a mixed-use skyscraper in Sydney, Australia, which is currently under construction.

== History ==
Construction of the building, designed by the architectural firms BVN Architecture and fjcstudio and developed by a joint venture between the real estate companies First Sponsor and ICD Property, began in 2024 and is scheduled for completion in 2027.

== Description ==
The skyscraper is located along Pitt Street in Sydney's CBD. The complex consists of a six-storey podium formed by three restored historic buildings, above which stands a contemporary 50-storey tower. The project clearly distinguishes the development's three primary functions, club, hotel, and residential, through separate and easily identifiable architectural volumes: the club occupies the historic podium, while the upper levels accommodate a 135-room hotel, set back from the eclectic façades of Pitt Street, and 241 residential apartments housed within the tower rising above.
