= One Circular Quay =

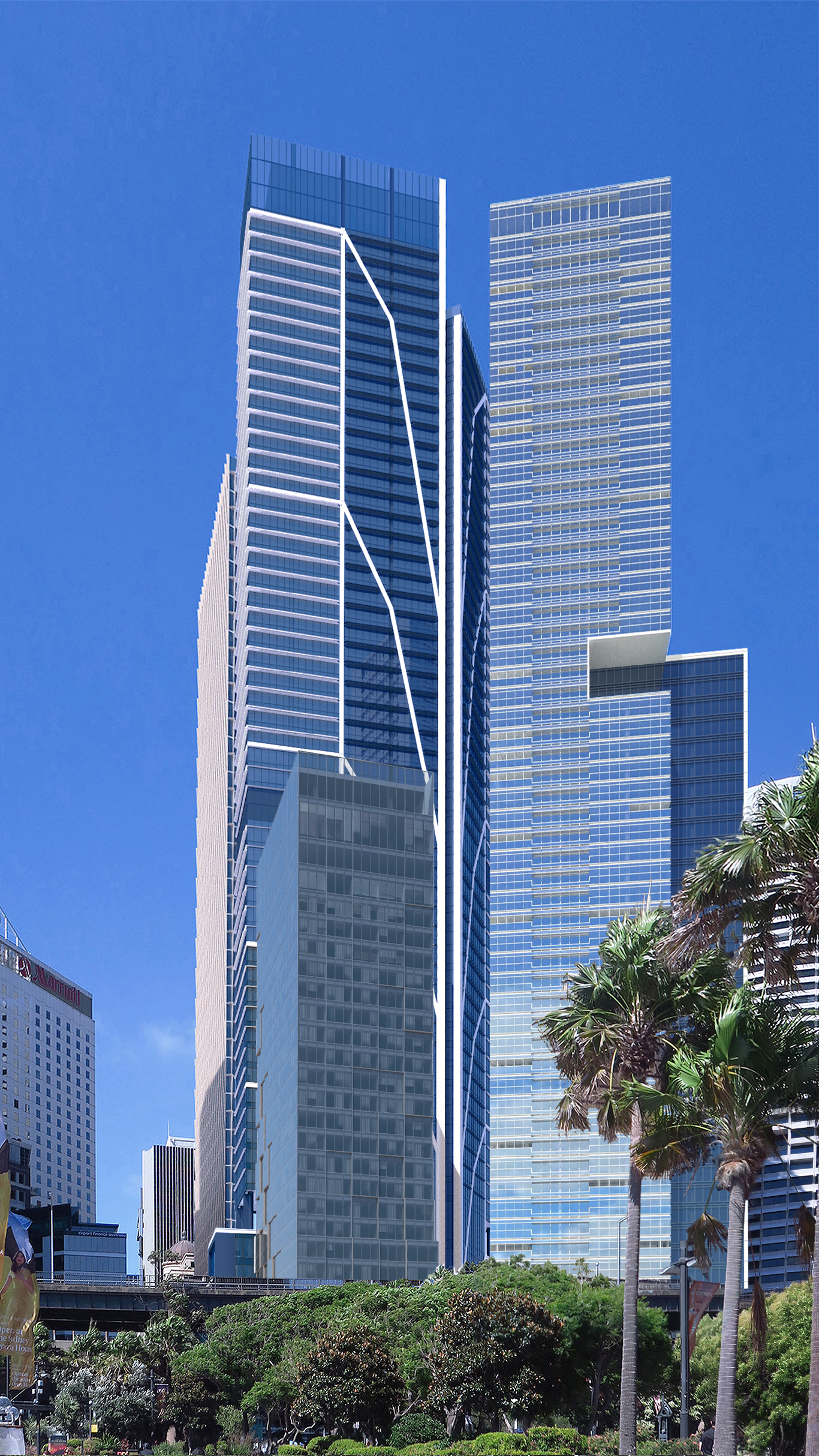
- Interactive map of the One Circular Quay area

General information
- Type: Residential
- Location: Sydney, Australia, Alfred Street, Sydney
- Coordinates: 33.8619°S 151.2084°E
- Construction started: 2022
- Opening: 2026

Height
- Height: 198 metres

Design and construction
- Architecture firm: Kerry Hill Architects
- Developer: Lendlease

One Circular Quay is a residential skyscraper in Sydney, Australia, which is currently under construction. Designed by Kerry Hill, the tower will stand at a height of 198 metres.

== History ==
Construction work on the building, developed by real estate company Lendlease and designed by architect Kerry Hill, began in 2022 and is expected to be completed in 2026. The site, previously occupied by Gold Fields House which was demolished starting in 2017, was purchased in 2022 by a joint venture between Lendlease and Mitsubishi Estate for approximately $850 million.

== Description ==
Located on Sydney's Circular Quay waterfront, the building will rise 60 stories to a height of 198 meters.
