= 55 Pitt Street =

- Interactive map of the 55 Pitt Street area

General information
- Type: Office
- Location: Sydney, Australia, Pitt Street, Sydney
- Coordinates: 33.8629°S 151.2088°E
- Construction started: 2023
- Opening: 2027

Height
- Height: 238 metres

Design and construction
- Developer: Mirvac

55 Pitt Street is an office skyscraper in Sydney, Australia, which is currently under construction. Designed by SHoP Architects and Woods Bagot, the tower will stand at a height of 238 metres.

== History ==
The building is being developed through a joint venture between Australia's Mirvac and Japan's Mitsui Fudosan, and has been designed by US-based architecture firm SHoP together with Australian practice Woods Bagot, who won an international competition in 2021. Construction works commenced in August 2023, with completion scheduled for 2027.

== Description ==
Located on Sydney's Circular Quay precinct, the building will rise 55 stories to a height of 238 meters, offering more than 60,000 square metres of office and retail space. It will be one of the tallest buildings in the city.

The base of the tower will showcase a podium with locally sourced sandstone, along with greenery and water features intended to evoke the ancient shoreline of Sydney Cove prior to European settlement and indigenous narratives.
