= 1 O'Connell Street =

Skyscraper in Sydney, Australia

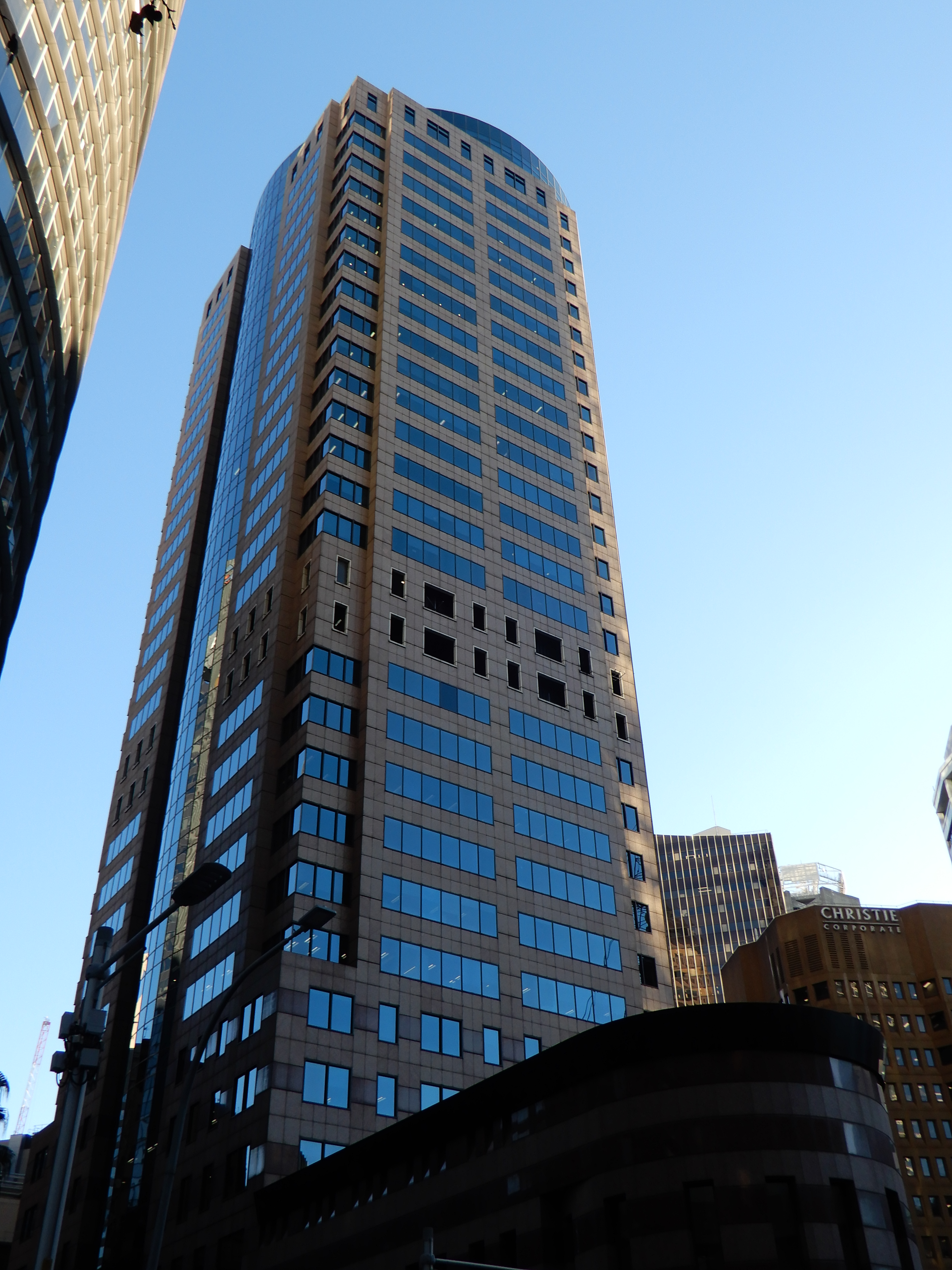
- The tower in 2024
- Interactive map of the 1 O'Connell Street area

General information
- Type: Commercial
- Location: Sydney central business district, 1 O'Connell Street, Sydney, Australia
- Coordinates: 33.8645°S 151.2098°E
- Opening: 1991
- Owner: Lendlease

Height
- Height: 166 metres

Technical details
- Size: 3,211 square metres (34,560 sq ft)
- Floor count: 36

Design and construction
- Architecture firm: Peddle Thorp & Walker
- Structural engineer: Arup Group

Other information
- Parking: 95

Website
- www.1oconnell.com.au

1 O'Connell Street is a skyscraper in Sydney. Designed by Peddle Thorp & Walker, the tower stands at a height of 166 metres.

== History ==
Construction works of the building, designed by the architecture firm Peddle Thorp & Walker, were completed in 1991. As of April 2024, the building is owned by Lendlease-managed APPF Commercial fund.
