= Atlassian Central =

Skyscraper under construction in Sydney, Australia

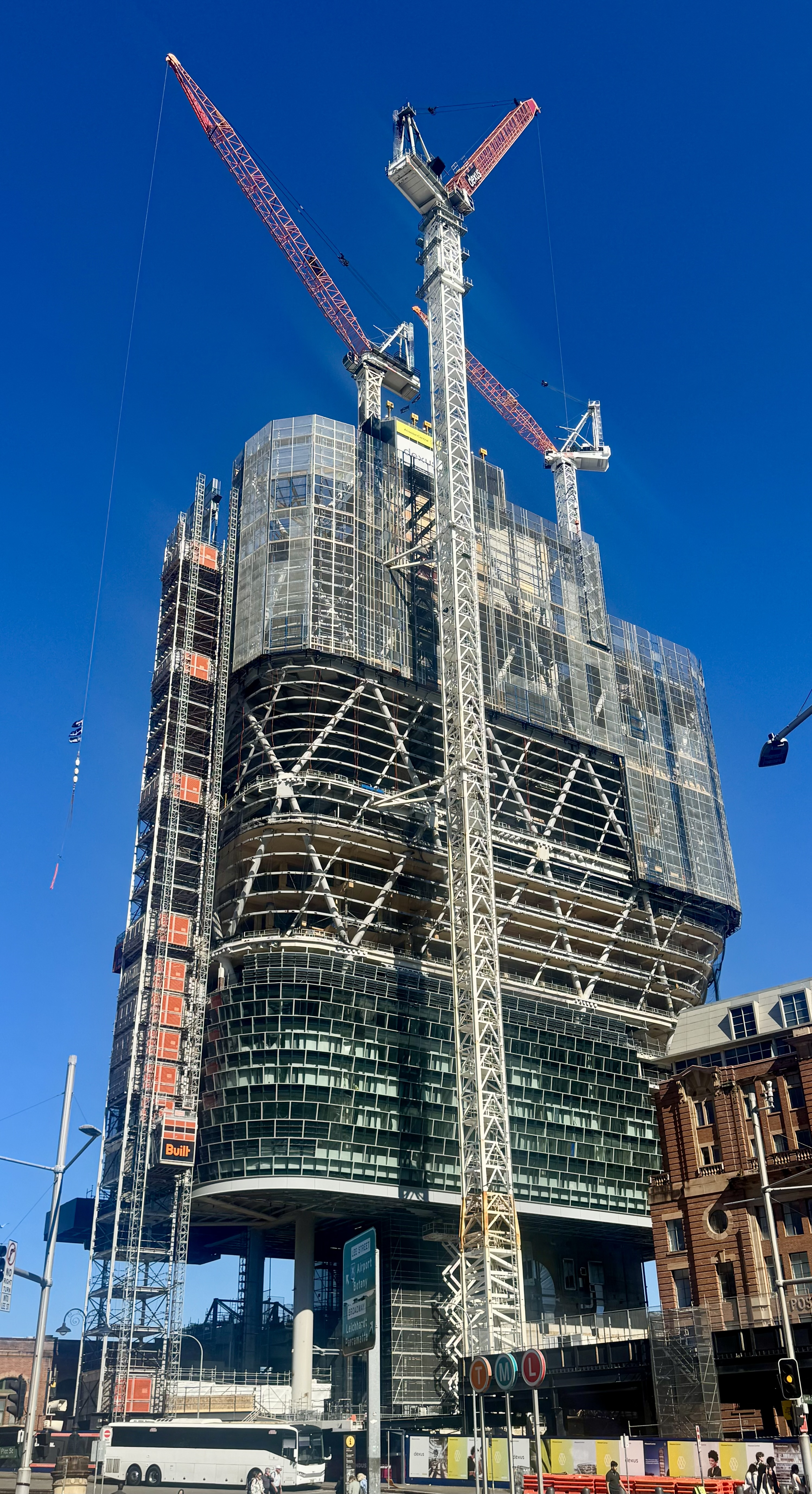
- Atlassian Central under construction in September 2025
- Interactive map of the Atlassian Central area

General information
- Type: Commercial
- Location: Haymarket, New South Wales, 8-10 Lee Street, Sydney, Australia
- Coordinates: 33.8838°S 151.2047°E
- Current tenants: Atlassian
- Construction started: 2022
- Estimated completion: 2026
- Cost: A$$1.4 billion
- Owner: Atlassian (35%); Dexus (65%)

Height
- Height: 183 metres (600 ft)

Technical details
- Material: Hybrid-timber
- Size: 112,400 square metres (1,210,000 sq ft)
- Floor count: 41
- Floor area: 75,658 square metres (814,380 sq ft)
- Grounds: 3,764 square metres (40,520 sq ft)

Design and construction
- Architecture firm: SHoP Architects; BVN Architecture
- Developer: Dexus
- Structural engineer: Eckersley O’Callaghan
- Main contractor: Built Australia; Obayashi Corporation; Mass Timber Installer Oriel Building Services Pty Ltd Surveying company Land Surveys “Isgroup”

Other information
- Number of rooms: 500

Website
- www.atlassiancentral.com.au

Atlassian Central is a skyscraper in Sydney, Australia, currently under construction and located next to Sydney's main transport hub, Central railway station. Designed by SHoP Architects and BVN Architecture, the building will rise 39 stories to a height of 183 meters. Once completed, it will be the tallest hybrid timber structure in the world, built using a combination of mass timber, concrete, and steel. The design features a glass and steel exoskeleton, planted terraces, and an innovative natural ventilation system.

The building will house Atlassian's headquarters and also include spaces dedicated to YHA Australia, which will occupy the lower five floors with its 500-bed “co-living” accommodation.

== History ==
Initial design of the building began in 2019 and was completed two and a half years later in August 2022, after 160 different cost plans, 55 embodied-carbon assessments, and 50 different design submissions. Atlassian engaged KPMG for their Direct Negotiation Proposal to the Government of New South Wales to procure the site.

Construction of the building by a joint venture between Built Pty Ltd and Obayashi Corporation began in August 2022 and is expected to be completed by 2026 at an estimated cost of approximately $1.4 billion Australian dollars. Its development is part of the Government of New South Wales's plan to create a technology district in the area adjacent to Central railway station.
