= 201 Elizabeth Street =

Skyscraper in Sydney, Australia

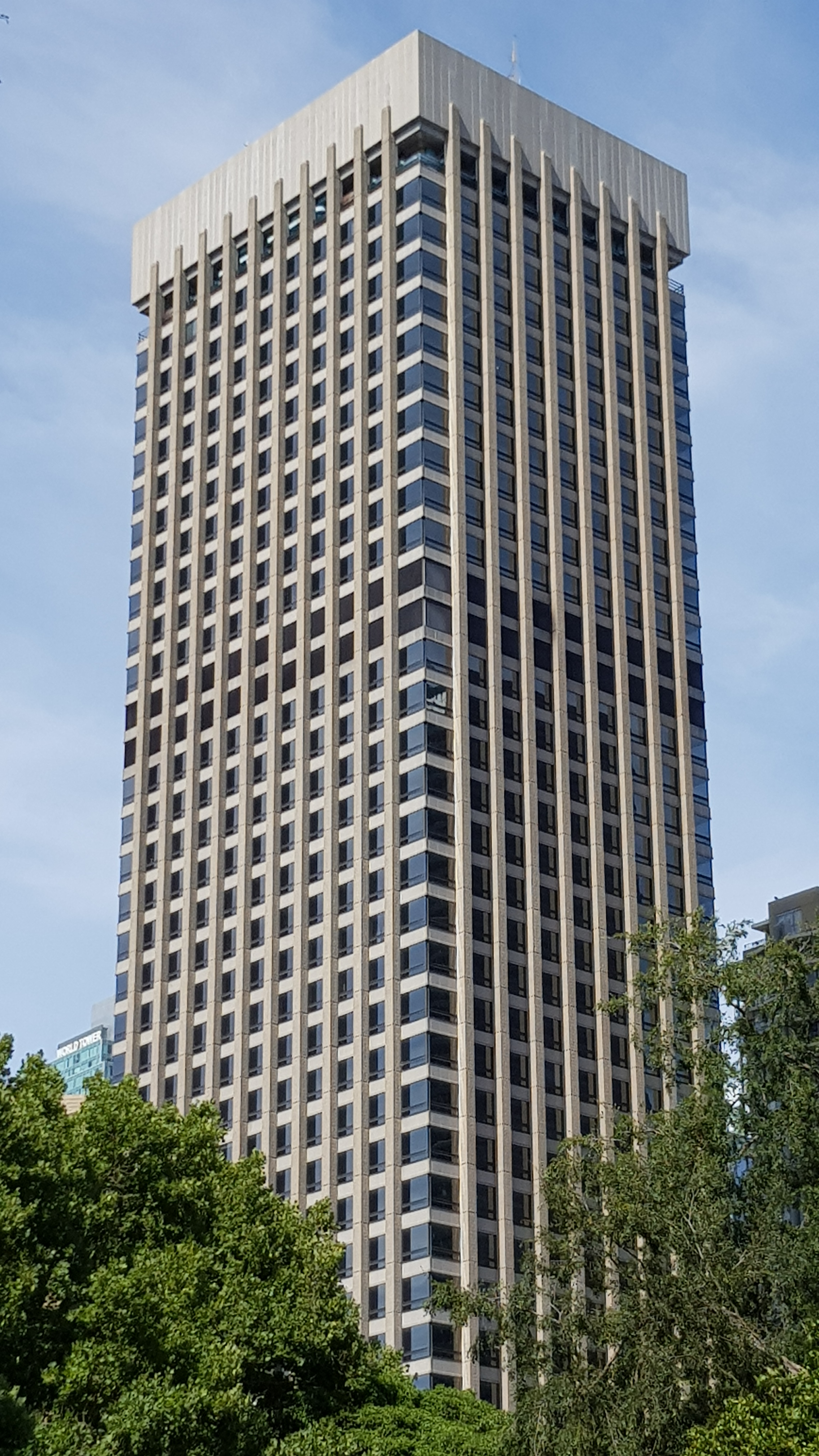
- Interactive map of the 201 Elizabeth Street area
- Alternative names: Pacific Power Building

General information
- Type: Commercial
- Location: Sydney, Australia
- Coordinates: 33.873771°S 151.209476°E
- Opening: 1978

Height
- Height: 165 metres

Design and construction
- Architecture firm: Kann, Finch and Partners

201 Elizabeth Street (formerly known as the Pacific Power Building) is a skyscraper in Sydney, Australia. Designed by Kann, Finch and Partners, the tower stands at a height of 165 metres.

== History ==
Construction works of the building, designed by architecture firm Kann, Finch and Partners, were completed in 1978. In 2019, Charter Hall and Abacus Group jointly purchased the building for 630 million Australian dollars, with Charter Hall holding a majority 68% stake and Abacus Group holding 32%.
