= 88 Walker Street =

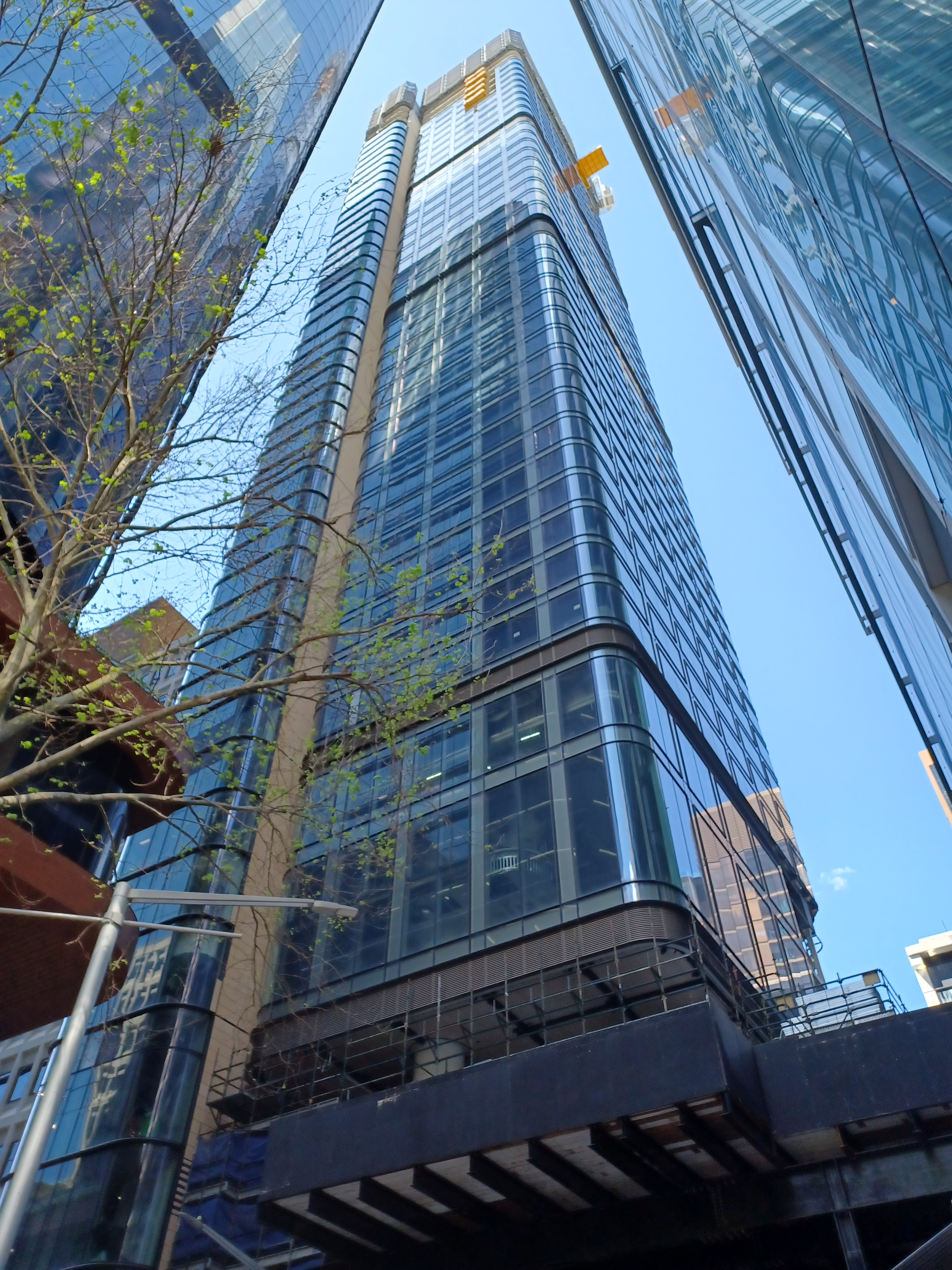
- Interactive map of the 88 Walker Street area

General information
- Type: Commercial
- Location: North Sydney, Australia
- Coordinates: 33°50′18″S 151°12′31″E
- Construction started: 2019
- Opening: 2023

Height
- Height: 181 metres (594 ft)

Design and construction
- Architecture firm: Fitzpatrick + Partners
- Developer: Billbergia
- Awards and prizes: WAF Completed Buildings – Mixed-Use category winner (2024)

88 Walker Street is a skyscraper in North Sydney, Australia. Designed by Fitzpatrick + Partners, the tower stands at the height of 181 metres, making it the tallest building in the North Sydney CBD.

== History ==
Construction works of the building, built by the real estate developer Billbergia and designed by the architecture firm Fitzpatrick + Partners, began in 2019 and were completed in 2023. The Singapore-based company Ascott Limited purchased the 252-room hotel space, opening a four-star Citadines-branded hotel there. LaSalle Investment Management separately acquired the office spaces in early 2022.

At the 2024 World Architecture Festival, 88 Walker won the Completed Buildings – Mixed-Use category.
