= Phillip Street =

Street in Sydney, Australia

Phillip Street, Sydney New South Wales
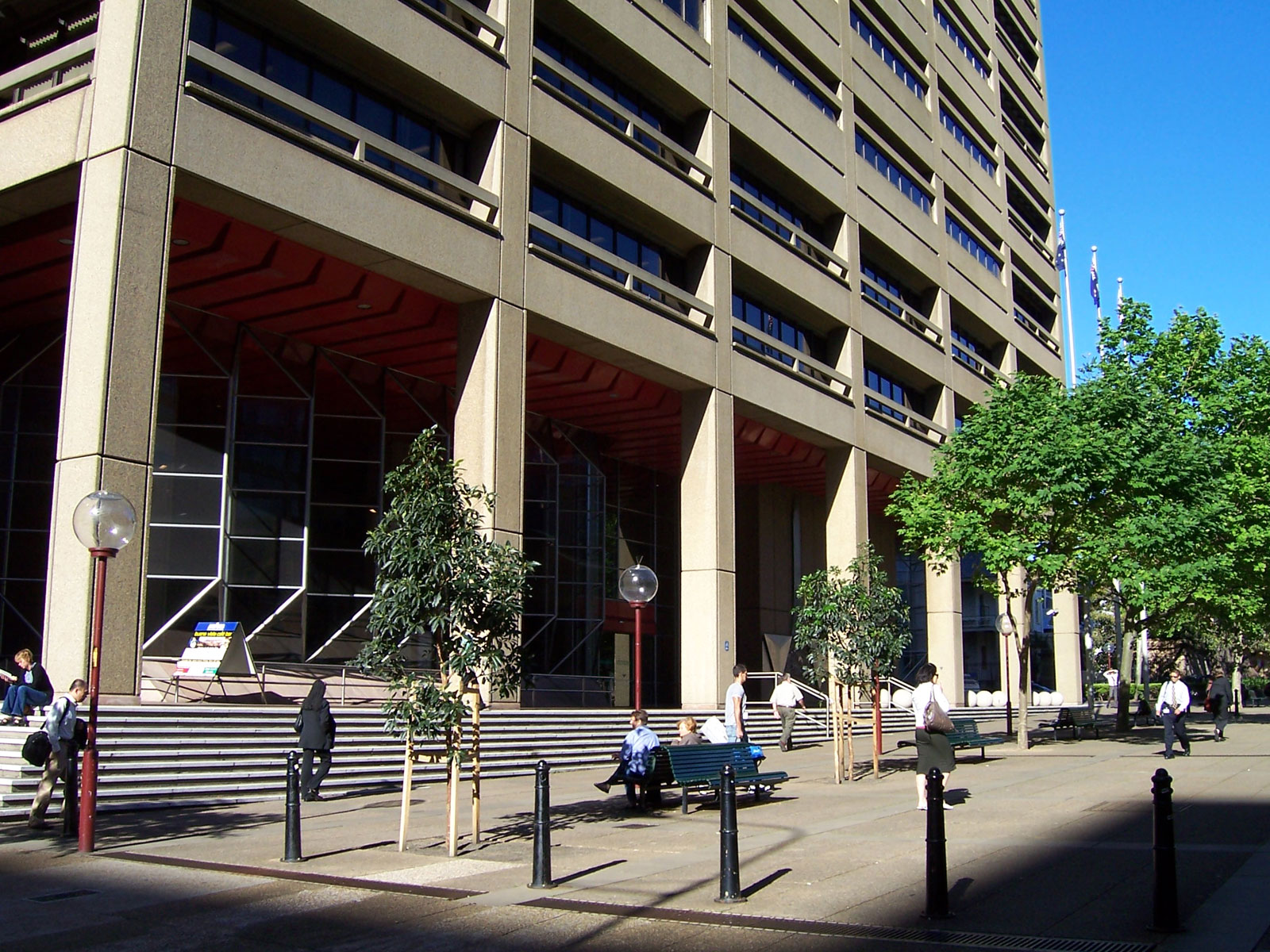
- NSW Supreme Court Building, on the corner of Phillip Street and Queen's Square
- Coordinates: 33.861682°S 151.212075°E (Northern end); 33.869163°S 151.211042°E (Southern end)

General information
- Type: Street
- Length: 850 m (0.5 mi)

Major junctions
- Northern end: Alfred Street; Sydney CBD
- Bridge Street; Bent Street; Elizabeth Street; Hunter Street; Martin Place
- Southern end: King Street; Sydney CBD

Location(s)
- LGA(s): City of Sydney
- Major suburbs: Sydney CBD

Phillip Street is a street in the central business district of Sydney in New South Wales, Australia. While the street runs from King Street in the south to Circular Quay in the north, the present street is effectively in two sections, separated by Chifley Square. Other cross streets include Martin Place, Bridge Street, and Bent Street. It is the hotspot of Sydney's legal elite.

== History ==
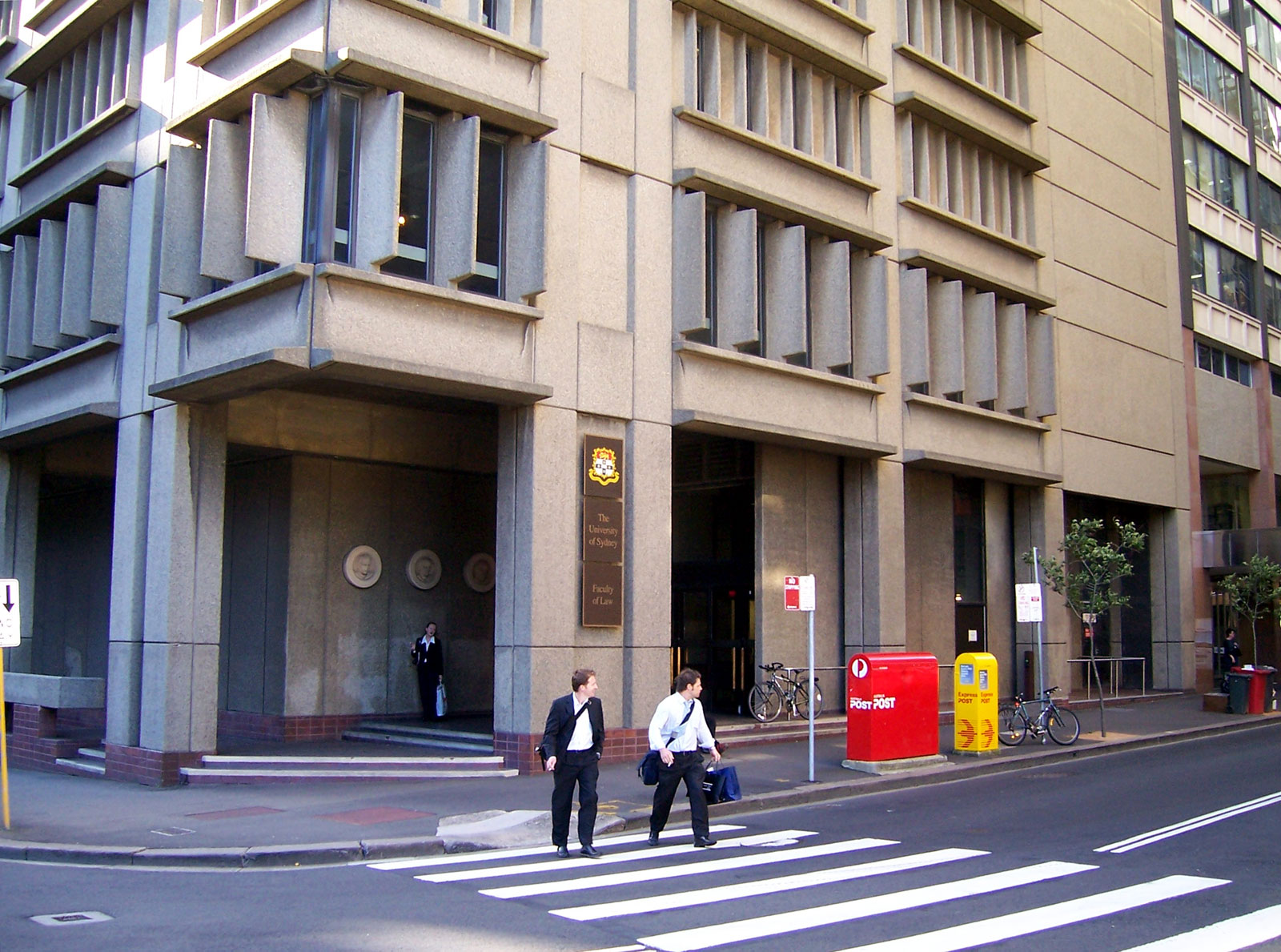
Sydney Law School

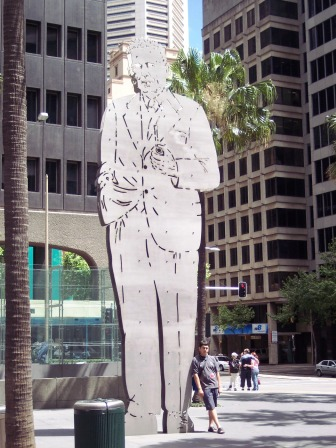
Ben Chifley statue in Chifley Place

Phillip Street initially ran from Hyde Park in the south and original Government House at Bent Street in the north. After the governor's residence moved to the present Government House and the old residence was demolished in 1846, the street was extended north to Circular Quay. Presumably, it was named after Captain Arthur Phillip, the first Governor of New South Wales.

In the 1860s the section of Phillip Street between Bent and Hunter Streets was realigned, to connect the northern section of Phillip Street with Elizabeth Street, rather than the southern section of Phillip Street. This junction is now Chifley Square.

Phillip Street was the residence of Henry Lawson when he first moved to Sydney in 1883. He joined his mother and sister at number 138, and was still living here when his first poem, A Song of the Republic, was published by The Bulletin on 1 October 1887.

== Location ==
The southern section of Phillip Street runs from Queens Square, at the end of King Street at 33.861735°S 151.212075°E, to Chifley Square, at the confluence of Hunter, Phillip, and Elizabeth Streets at 33.866339°S 151.211151°E. At Chifley Square, Elizabeth Street takes a turn to the right and becomes the northern section of Phillip Street, which is aligned in a north–south direction with the southern section. The street is two-ways in both sections.

Located along Phillip Street are a number of office buildings, including the premises of a large portion of Sydney's legal profession, as well as the Supreme Court of New South Wales, Federal Court of Australia, High Court of Australia and St. James campus of the Sydney Law School. Other prominent buildings along the street include Aurora Place, Chifley Tower, and Deutsche Bank Place, Commonwealth Parliament Offices, Sydney and the headquarters of the Reserve Bank of Australia, as well as St James' Church. The headquarters of the Australian Rugby League and New South Wales Rugby League organisations are also located here, with Australia's traditional rugby league administration sometimes referred to as "Phillip Street".

A variety of cafés and restaurants located along the street service these institutions. Railway stations located on or near Phillip Street include St James, Martin Place, and Circular Quay.
