= Deutsche Bank Place =

Skyscraper in Sydney, New South Wales, Australia

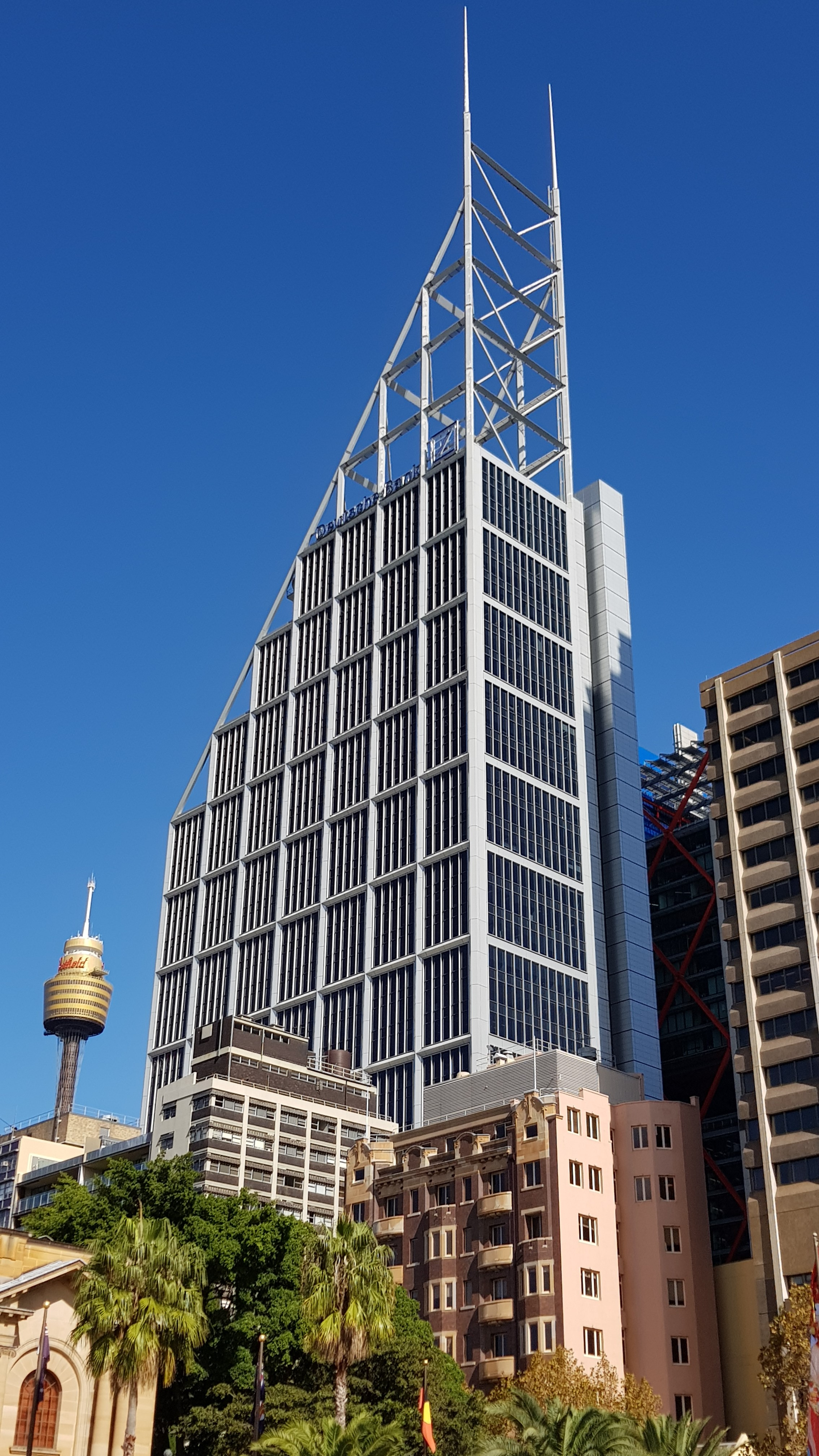
- Deutsche Bank Place in May 2018
- Interactive map of the Deutsche Bank Place area
- Alternative names: BT Tower

General information
- Status: Completed
- Type: Commercial
- Architectural style: Late Modernism / Structural expressionism
- Location: Sydney central business district, 126 Phillip Street, Sydney, New South Wales, Australia
- Coordinates: 33°52′1″S 151°12′42″E
- Current tenants: Deutsche Bank; New Chambers; Infrastructure Australia
- Construction started: 2003
- Completed: 2005
- Renovated: 2026
- Cost: A$450m
- Owner: Investa Commercial Property Fund (ICPF), Investa Gateway Office (IGO) and Mirvac Managed Fund (LAT)

Height
- Antenna spire: 240 metres (790 ft)
- Roof: 160 metres (520 ft)

Technical details
- Material: Concrete, glass and steel
- Floor count: 34
- Floor area: 42,965 square metres (462,470 sq ft)
- Lifts/elevators: 16

Design and construction
- Architect: Norman Foster
- Architecture firm: Foster + Partners
- Developer: Investa Property Group
- Structural engineer: Arup Group
- Other designers: Hassell
- Quantity surveyor: Rider Hunt
- Main contractor: Lendlease

Renovating team
- Architects: Warren and Mahony

Website
- www.investa.com.au/properties/deutsche-bank-place-126-phillip-street-sydney-nsw-2000/
List of tallest buildings in Australia
Next Shortest World Tower; 230m	Next Tallest Citigroup Centre; 243m
Heights are to highest architectural element.

Deutsche Bank Place is a 240-metre-high (790 ft), 39-storey skyscraper in Sydney, New South Wales, Australia. It is located at 126 Phillip Street (corner of Hunter Street) in the north-eastern end of the central business district, across the road from Chifley Tower. Construction began in 2002 and was completed in 2005. The building's architect is Norman Foster of Foster + Partners.

Deutsche Bank is the primary tenant, occupying seven floors and owning the naming rights. In May 2026, Allens officially moved its Sydney office to the top floors of 33 Alfred Street in Circular Quay, leaving its longtime home at Deutsche Bank Place.
