= FDC =

FDC may refer to:

== Organizations ==
=== Companies ===
- Food Donation Connection, an American surplus food rescue company
- Football DataCo, a British football media company
- Forensic DNA Consultants, a South African forensics company
- Filinvest, a Philippine real estate conglomerate
- First Data, an American financial services company

=== Government and politics ===
- Congolese Democratic Front, a political party in the Republic of the Congo
- Democratic Front of Cabinda (Portuguese: Frente Democratica de Cabinda), a rebel group in Cabinda, Angola
- Democratic Front of the Comoros (French: Front Démocratique des Comores), a defunct Comoran political party
- Federal detention center, part of the US Bureau of Prisons
- Federal Food, Drug, and Cosmetic Act, of the US federal government
- Federation for a Democratic China, a political group in China
- Florida Department of Corrections, in the US
- Forum for Democratic Change, a political party in Uganda

=== Education ===
- Forward Degree College, in Pakistan
- Fundação Dom Cabral, a Brazilian business school

== Science and technology ==
- Floppy-disk controller, hardware that controls a computer floppy disk drive
- HP Flexible Data Center, a modular data center built from prefabricated components by Hewlett-Packard
- Flow duration curve, used to evaluate small hydro-electric plants

=== Medicine ===
- Ferulic acid decarboxylase (Fdc), decarboxylase enzymes
- Fixed dose combination, a medicine that includes two or more active ingredients combined in a single dosage form
- Follicular dendritic cells, of the immune system

== Other uses ==
- FIFA Disciplinary Code, a set of codes and regulations promulgated by FIFA's judicial bodies
- Fire direction center, of a military field artillery team
- First day cover, a postage stamp franked on the first day of issue
- First Down Classic, a former American football bowl game
- Fleur de Coin, a term in coin grading
- Flight Data Coordinator, in Australia
- Fuera de Clase, a Venezuelan boy band
- Fire department connection, a standpipe in the Glossary of firefighting
- Festival da Canção, the national selection for Portugal in the Eurovision Song Contest
- Funds Dissemination Committee, Wikipedia body for the international distribution of funds in the Wikimedia movement
- Fire Distribution Center, the control unit in the NASAMS missile system
