= Australian Defence Air Traffic System =

Australian Defence Air Traffic System (ADATS) is the hardware and software system used by the Royal Australian Air Force for Air Traffic Control services. It is a computer based system, which serves as an aid to Air Traffic Controllers. It does not control aircraft, but gives the user a display of information about an aircraft's position and associated information. It also handles communications and other information exchanges.

It is one of two systems in Australia, the other being The Australian Advanced Air Traffic System (TAAATS), which is used by Airservices Australia (civilians)

== See also ==
- Australian Air Traffic Control
- The Australian Advanced Air Traffic System
- Royal Australian Air Force
