= Australian air traffic control =

Air traffic control in Australia is provided by two independent organisations, one civilian and one military. The civilian provider is Airservices Australia, which controls civilian airfields and airspace. The military provider is the Royal Australian Air Force (RAAF), which controls military airfields and adjoining airspace. This includes Australian Army and Royal Australian Navy aviation bases.

Some airfields in Australia are categorised as Joint User airfields, where there are both civilian and military operations based at the airfield. Joint User airfields have air traffic control provided by the RAAF. Currently these are located at Darwin, Townsville and Williamtown (Newcastle).

Air traffic controllers manage the safe and orderly flow of aircraft into, out of, and between airports throughout Australia and with overseas regions adjoining Australian airspace. Australian civilian air traffic controllers are employed under an Air Traffic Control Enterprise Agreement.

== History ==
Civilian air traffic control developed after WWII when returning servicemen gained employment as both aircrew and ground control. From 1988 to 1995 air traffic control in Australia was the responsibility of the Civil Aviation Authority. The CAA was split into two separate government organisations in July 1995: the regulator, the Civil Aviation Safety Authority (CASA), and the service provider, Airservices Australia.

CASA was made responsible for aviation safety regulations and approvals: licensing of pilots, aviation engineers and air traffic controllers; airworthiness of aircraft; medical standards for aircrew and air traffic controllers; aviation services, including air transport operations (airlines and charter), maintenance operations, ATC services, and aviation rescue and fire fighting.

Airservices Australia was made responsible for delivery of services to aviation: airspace management, aeronautical information, communications, radio navigation aids, airport rescue fire fighting services, and aviation search and rescue. The role of aviation search and rescue was transferred from Airservices Australia to the Australian Maritime Safety Authority in 1997. Airspace management was transferred to CASA in 2007.

== Civilian air traffic control ==
Airservices Australia is a government-owned corporation that provides air traffic control (ATC) services, as well as other related services such as communications, navigation, surveillance, aeronautical data and airfield fire services. ATC services include tower, approach and centre (en route) services.

Currently, most Airservices Australia ATC units use The Australian Advanced Air Traffic System. The introduction of the new computerised system increased controllers' productivity.

=== Towers ===
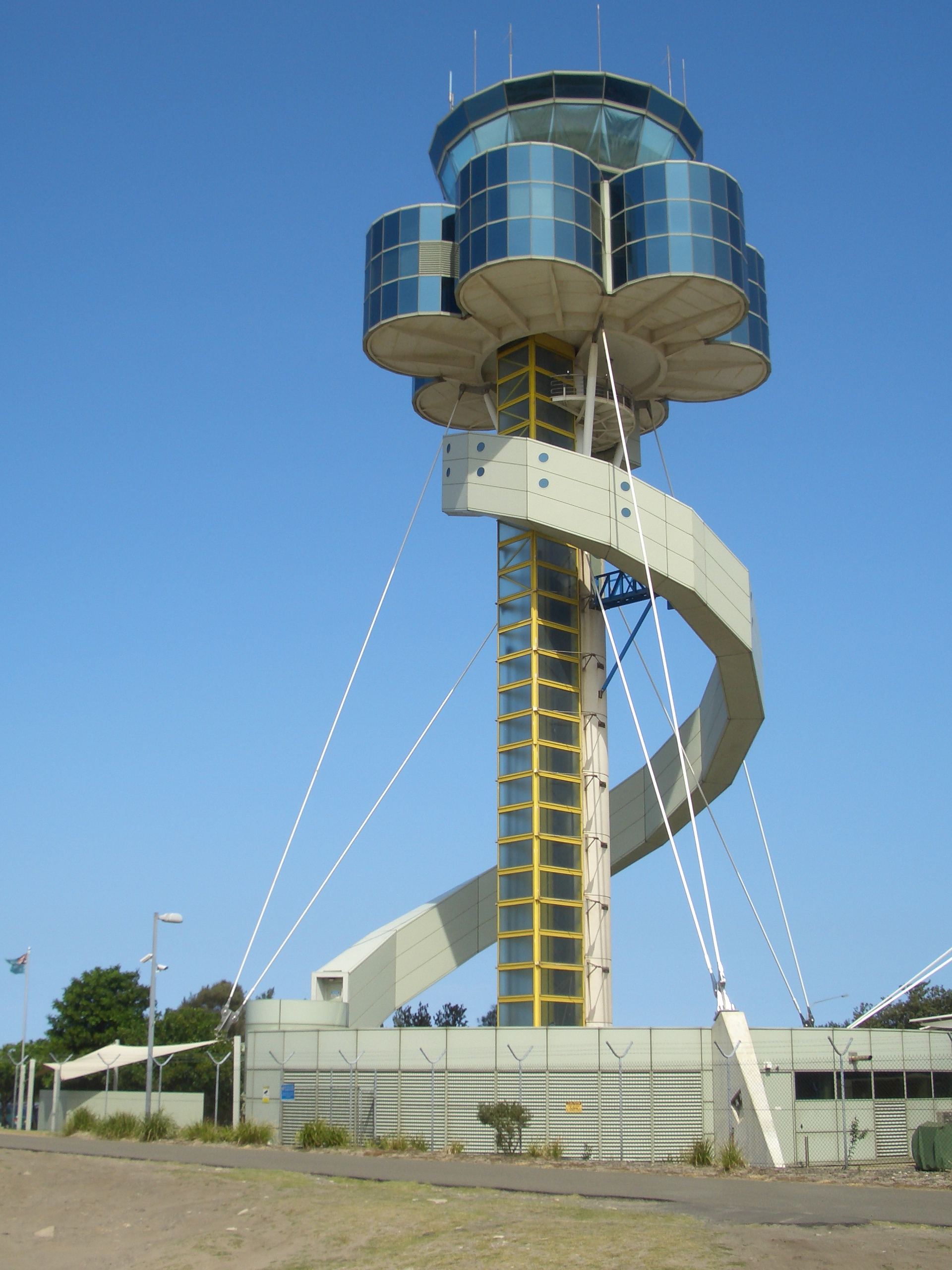
Sydney Airport Control Tower

Airservices Australia operates from the following air traffic control towers:

==== Major airports ====
- Adelaide Airport (YPAD), SA
- Brisbane Airport (YBBN), QLD
- Cairns Airport (YBCS), QLD
- Canberra Airport (YSCB), ACT
- Gold Coast Airport (YBCG), QLD
- Hobart Airport (YMHB), TAS
- Melbourne Airport (YMML), VIC
- Perth Airport (YPPH), WA
- Sydney Airport Air Traffic Control Tower (YSSY), NSW

==== Other airports ====
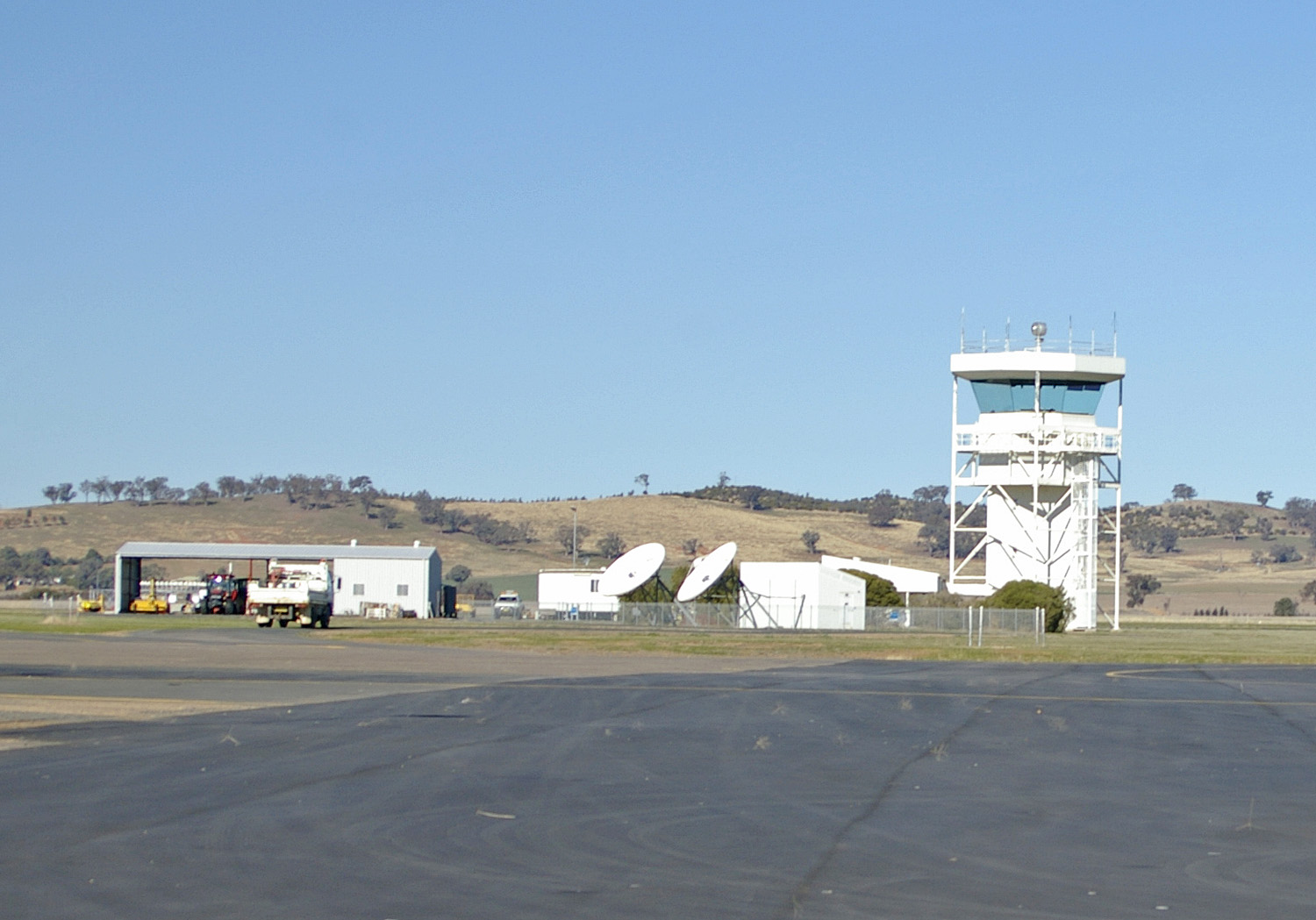
Wagga Wagga Airport Control Tower (Now disused)

- Albury Airport (YMAY), NSW
- Alice Springs Airport (YBAS), NT
- Archerfield Airport (YBAF), QLD
- Avalon Airport (YMAV), VIC
- Bankstown Airport Air Traffic Control Tower (YSBK), NSW
- Broome Airport (YBRM), WA
- Camden Airport (YSCN), NSW
- Coffs Harbour Airport (YCFS), NSW
- Essendon Airport (YMEN), VIC
- Hamilton Island Airport (YBHM), QLD
- Jandakot Airport (YPJT), WA
- Karratha Airport (YPKA), WA
- Launceston Airport (YMLT), TAS
- Mackay Airport (YBMK), QLD
- Moorabbin Airport (YMMB), VIC
- Parafield Airport (YPPF), SA
- Sunshine Coast Airport (YBSU), QLD
- Rockhampton Airport (YBRK), QLD
- Tamworth Airport (YSTW), NSW

==== Airports with aerodrome flight information service (AFIS) ====
- Port Hedland Airport (YPPD), WA

=== Terminal Control Units ===
Airservices Australia has six terminal control units (TCU). Controllers in a TCU use radar and other surveillance technology to manage the flow of aircraft arriving and departing from major city airports. Airservices provides air traffic control services in an extended area around capital city airports, and maximise the safe use of this airspace. The TCU services are provided around the following major airports:

- Adelaide, SA (integrated into Melbourne Centre, as of mid-2017)
- Brisbane, QLD (integrated into Brisbane Centre)
- Cairns, QLD (integrated into Brisbane Centre, as of mid-2017)
- Canberra, ACT (integrated into Melbourne Centre)
- Hobart & Launceston, TAS (located in Melbourne Centre, commenced 16 June 2022)
- Mackay & Rockhampton, QLD (located in Brisbane Centre, commenced 16 June 2022)
- Melbourne, VIC (integrated into Melbourne Centre)
- Perth, WA (shared facility with Pearce air traffic controllers, located at Perth Airport)
- Sydney, NSW (located at Sydney Airport)

=== Area control centres ===
Airservices Australia manages 11 per cent of the world's airspace, including very large portions of the Indian and Southern Oceans, and parts of the Pacific Ocean and Tasman Sea. The airspace consists of two flight information regions (FIR), the Brisbane FIR and the Melbourne FIR. Each FIR is managed by its respective area control centre (ACC), which provide en-route services.

==== Brisbane Centre ====
The Brisbane FIR consists of New South Wales north of Sydney, all of Queensland, most of the Northern Territory and the northern half of Western Australia. It also contains the Australian Tasman Sea airspace. Due to the nature of the airspace, it controls most international flights in and out of Australia (except Indian Ocean flights), and domestic flights operating to airports within the FIR. As only two of eight capitals are located in the Brisbane FIR, it handles a lesser volume of traffic than Melbourne Centre. However, Sydney is just south of the border of the two FIRs (the Sydney Basin is part of the Melbourne FIR), and thus Brisbane Centre has control of flights arriving or departing in Sydney from the north.

Brisbane Centre is located adjacent to Brisbane Tower at Brisbane Airport. It also contains Brisbane Approach and Cairns Approach.

==== Melbourne Centre ====
The Melbourne FIR consists of all other Australian airspace outside the Brisbane FIR. This includes Victoria, Tasmania, southern New South Wales including Sydney, most of South Australia and the southern half of Western Australia. It also contains the Australian Indian and Southern Ocean airspace. Apart from international flights arriving from the Indian Ocean, most international flights will pass through Brisbane Centre first. However, as the FIR contains six of the eight capital cities, a very large portion of domestic flights are controlled from Melbourne Centre.

Melbourne Centre is located adjacent to Melbourne Tower at Melbourne Airport. It also contains Melbourne Approach, Canberra Approach and Adelaide Approach.

== Military air traffic control ==
Like civil air traffic control, the Australian Defence Force provide tower and approach services but do not provide en route services.

Although historically each of the three services had its own air traffic controllers, the Royal Australian Air Force exclusively provides air traffic control services to the Australian Defence Force.

44 Wing (44WG) was formed to centrally manage ATC personnel and facilities at 11 defence bases. 44 Wing is an Air Command unit, belonging to the Surveillance and Response Group and is headquartered at RAAF Base Williamtown, Williamtown, NSW. 44WG is divided into two squadrons; No. 452 Squadron which consists of all ATC units at bases north of the Queensland border, and No. 453 Squadron which consists of ATC units at bases south of the Queensland border. The ATC unit established at each base in known as a flight and belongs to one of the two squadrons. Each flight manages air traffic control services at the base, although is ultimately commanded from HQ452SQN, RAAF Base Darwin or HQ453SQN RAAF Base Williamtown.

The RAAF provides both tower and approach services, and in some cases a limited centre (or en route) service. However, centre services are normally amalgamated with approach control. Two bases, Richmond and Edinburgh, provide only a tower service, given their close proximity to Sydney and Adelaide respectively. Civilian ATC provides approach services to these bases.

Tower and approach services are normally located within the control tower or an adjacent building. Unlike civilian ATC, no approach or en route services are provided remotely.

Currently, most military ATC units use the Australian Defence Air Traffic System. The RAAF use Airservices Australia's TAAATS systems in Perth to provide approach services to RAAF Base Pearce.

=== Military ATC units ===
==== Royal Australian Air Force ====
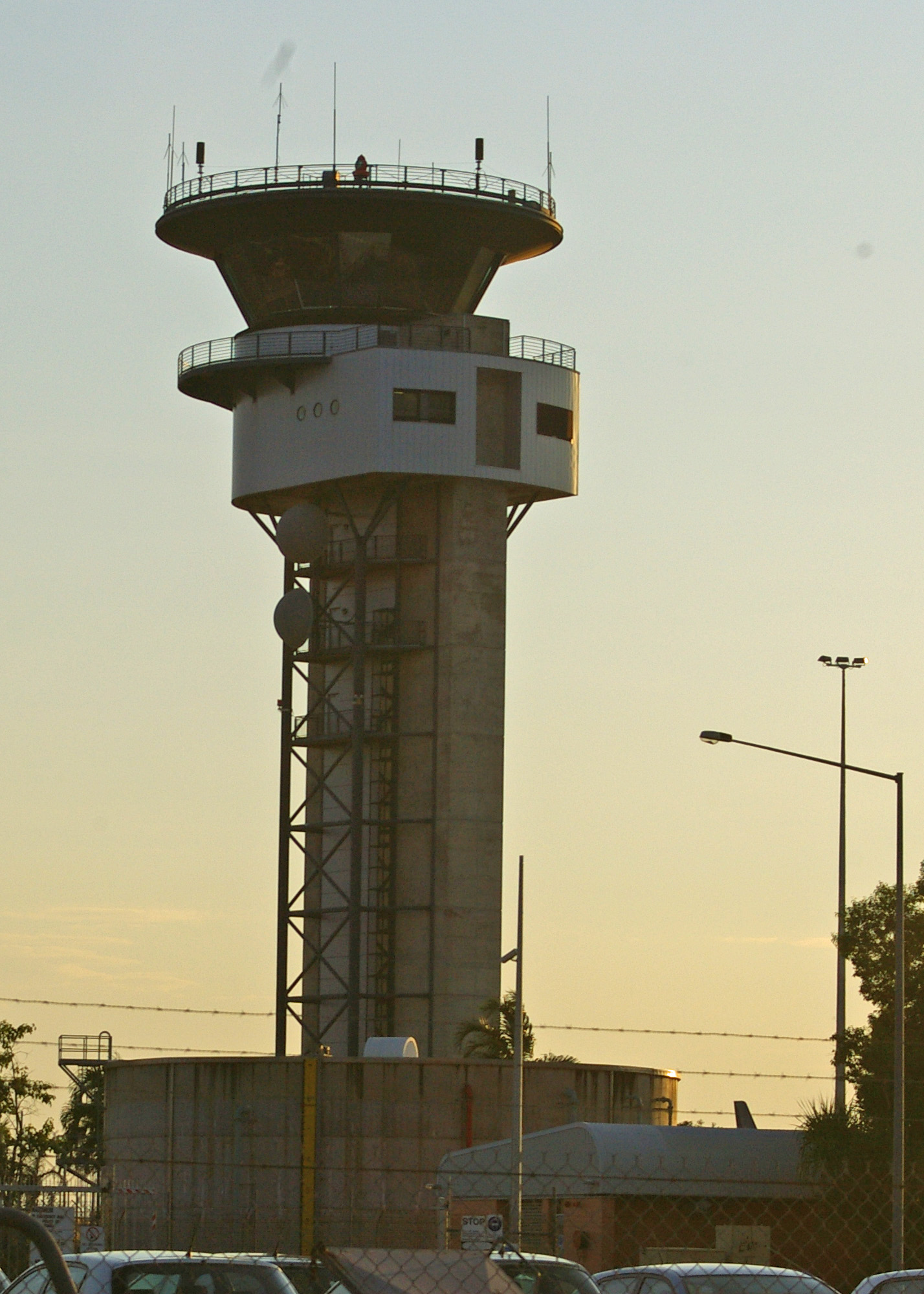
RAAF Base Darwin/Darwin International Airport Control Tower

- RAAF Base Amberley - 452SQN AMB FLT (Tower and Approach)
- RAAF Base Darwin - 452SQN DAR FLT (Tower and Approach)
- RAAF Base East Sale - 453SQN ESL FLT (Tower and Approach)
- RAAF Base Edinburgh - 453SQN EDN FLT (Tower only)
- RAAF Base Pearce - 453SQN PEA FLT (Tower, Approach and Centre)
- RAAF Base Richmond - 453SQN RIC FLT (Tower only)
- RAAF Base Tindal - 452SQN TDL FLT (Tower and Approach)
- RAAF Base Townsville - 452SQN TVL FLT (Tower and Approach)
- RAAF Base Williamtown - 453SQN WLM FLT (Tower, Approach and Centre)
- RAAF Gingin - (Pearce provides a Tower and Approach service)

==== Royal Australian Navy ====
- HMAS Albatross Naval Air Station Nowra - 453SQN NWA FLT (Tower and Approach)
- Jervis Bay Airfield (Nowra provides Approach services only, there is no Tower service)

==== Australian Army ====
- Army Aviation Centre/Army Airfield Oakey - 452SQN OAK FLT (Tower and Approach)

==== Joint User Airfields ====
- Darwin International Airport - (co-located with RAAF Base Darwin)
- Townsville International Airport - (co-located with RAAF Base Townsville)

== See also ==
- List of airports in Australia
