= Civil Air Operations Officers' Association of Australia =

Australian trade union

Civil Air
- Civil Air Operations Officers' Association of Australia
- Founded: 1948
- Headquarters: Port Melbourne, Victoria
- Location: Australia
- Members: ▲992 (as at 31 December 2025)
- Key people: Scott Nugent, President, Peter McGuane, Executive Secretary
- Affiliations: ACTU, IFATCA
- Website: www.civilair.asn.au

The Civil Air Operations Officers' Association of Australia (CAOOAA), known as Civil Air, is a trade union in Australia. It was founded in 1948 and represents air traffic controllers, Simulator Support Officers (SSO), Flight Data Coordinators (FDC) and other support specialists.

Civil Air is affiliated with the Australian Council of Trade Unions, and internationally with the International Federation of Air Traffic Controllers' Associations.
