= Ken Woolley =

Sydney based Australian architect

Ken Woolley AM
- Born: Kenneth Frank Charles Woolley; 29 May 1933; Sydney, Australia
- Died: 25 November 2015 (aged 82); Sydney, Australia
- Occupation: Architect
- Known for: Pettit & Sevitt houses, Ancher Mortlock Woolley architecture firm and the Sydney School
- Awards: Robin Boyd Award, 1987 Wilkinson Award 1962, 1968, 1983 & 1987; Blacket Prize 1967, 1969 & 1987
- Practice: NSW Government Architects (1955—1964), Ancher Mortlock Murray and Woolley (1964—1975), Ancher Mortlock and Woolley (1975—2013)
- Buildings: Chemistry School 1958, Fisher Library 1962, State Office Block 1965, Woolley House 1962, Park Hyatt Hotel 1987, ABC Ultimo Centre 1988

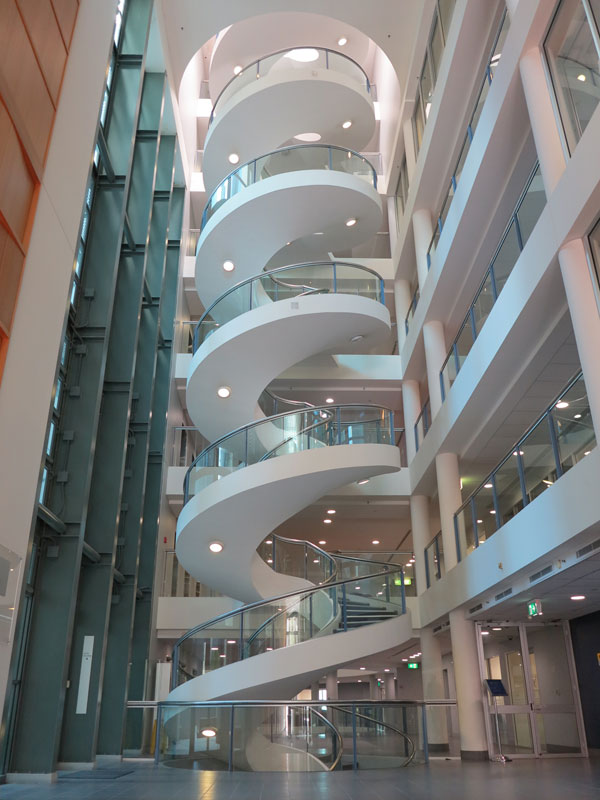
DNA-inspired helical staircase, part of the Garvan Institute of Medical Research building designed by Ken Woolley

Kenneth Frank Charles Woolley AM, (29 May 1933 – 25 November 2015) was an Australian architect. In a career spanning 60 years, he is best known for his contributions to project housing with Pettit and Sevitt, as well as for being a four-time winner of the Wilkinson Award, including three times for his own house (the first being the 1962 Woolley House in Mosman), and his longstanding partnership with Sydney Ancher and Bryce Mortlock. He is regarded as being a prominent figure in the development of the Sydney School movement and in Australian vernacular building.

== Architectural career ==
Ken Woolley was born in Sydney on 29 May 1933. He attended Sydney Boys High School and studied architecture at the University of Sydney School of Architecture, Design and Planning, graduating in 1955. On graduation, he worked in the Government Architects Branch of the New South Wales Public Works Department. During this time he was the design architect for the Fisher Library at the University of Sydney and the State Office Block on Macquarie Street (now demolished). He joined Ancher Mortlock Murray & Woolley in 1964, just prior to Ancher's retirement. This practice has received all the major architectural awards and created numerous outstanding buildings which include the Australian Embassy in Bangkok, Town Hall House Sydney, the Park Hyatt at Campbell's Cove, the ABC Radio and Orchestra Centre at Ultimo, the Victorian State Library, the Control Tower at Sydney Airport, the Olympics and RAS Dome Exhibition and Indoor Sports Halls, the Olympic Hockey Stadium, the Sydney Convention Centre, Darling Harbour and the refurbishment of the Queen Victoria Building. The most recent recognition was to the State Library of Victoria with the 2006 Lachlan Macquarie Award for Heritage Architecture.

== Notable projects ==
A Pettit and Sevitt project house designed by Ken Woolley.

Woolley took on a growing number of outside projects while still working with the Government Architect. He generated a reputation in the field of housing, winning a low cost competition for an exhibition house with Michael Dysart, in 1958. Consequently, both architects were invited to submit designs for a display village of model project houses in Carlingford, in 1961, proving to be a successful event that signalled the architect designed project house to be a welcome alternative to the individually designed and standard range houses of the time.

He began a working relationship with the project housing company, Pettit and Sevitt, the same year, creating house types of high quality design and construction. "Split Level", "Lowline" and other early forms incorporated design principles through simple lines, natural features and an emphasis on functionalism. They were widely affordable due to the standardised usage of materials: brick veneer construction, Gyprock plasterboard interior wall cladding, Monier concrete tiles and Stegbar aluminium windows. They often used basic grids, rectangular planes, and flat roofs, and were always firmly grounded with room to be easily adapted to various sites and terrains. These sophisticated types underwent various levels of modifications as they were marketed through display villages and later sold to individual buyers, who had a consultation with the architect to discuss the interior and exterior details, as a part of the service. Through these modifications based on the clients' needs and clever marketing, these houses gained an unprecedented popularity with prominent architects worldwide.

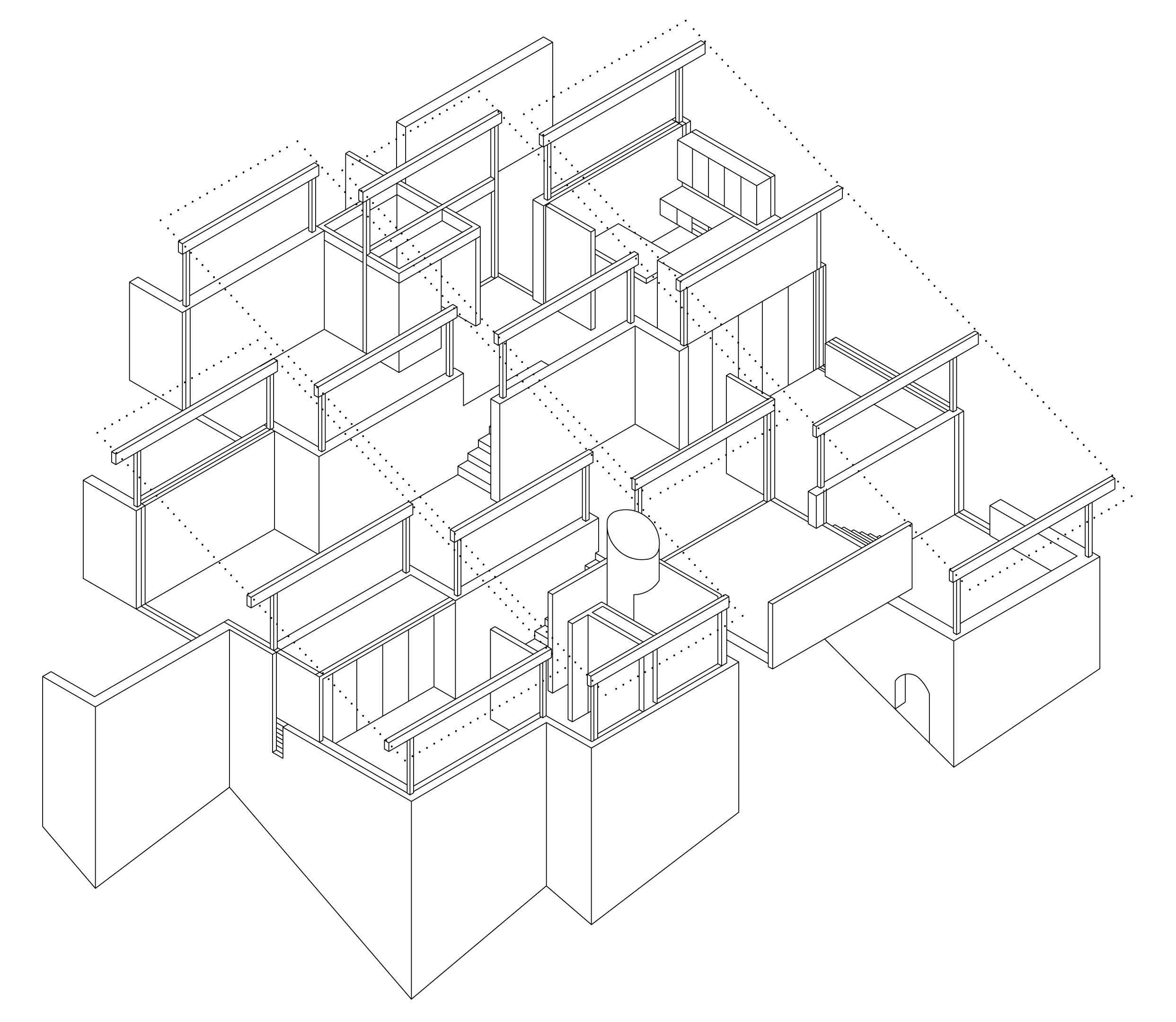
An axonometric drawing detailing the sidestepping walls of the Woolley House in Mosman.

At the completion of his own home, the Woolley House in Mosman in 1962, a work he would become most famous for, Ken Woolley emerged as a leading figure in a regional romantic movement often referred to as Sydney School. This evolving movement combined the influence of organic architecture, brutalism and the Arts and Crafts movement together with elements of the International Style, and came to embody the harmonious relationships between man and nature as intimate domestic spaces in the Australian bushland. The basis of the Woolley House design was derived from a series of garden terraces, most of which were covered by sections of timber roof sloping parallel to the land. A geometric order was applied to the plan as a series of 12-foot square units that combine to make up the main central space. Natural materials were exploited, with neutral colour schemes of dark tiles, western red cedar boarding and panelling, and painted bricks, creating a feeling of warmth in the house. The open plan living spaces were connected with volumes containing variations of ceiling height and changes in direction, enabling floor areas to be narrow but for the feeling of space to still be maximised. The house won RAIA’s Wilkinson Award the same year it was completed. The house was gifted to the University of NSW in 2016 by the Hesketh family.

Woolley joined the existing partnership of Sydney Ancher, Bryce Mortlock and Stuart Murray in 1964, and with Murray leaving the practice in 1975, as Ancher Mortlock & Woolley, the team went on to establish a reputation in the design of special purpose buildings. Notable examples are the Australian Broadcasting Corporation (ABC) Ultimo Centre, the RAS Dome and Exhibition Hall and the Olympic Hockey Stadium at Homebush.

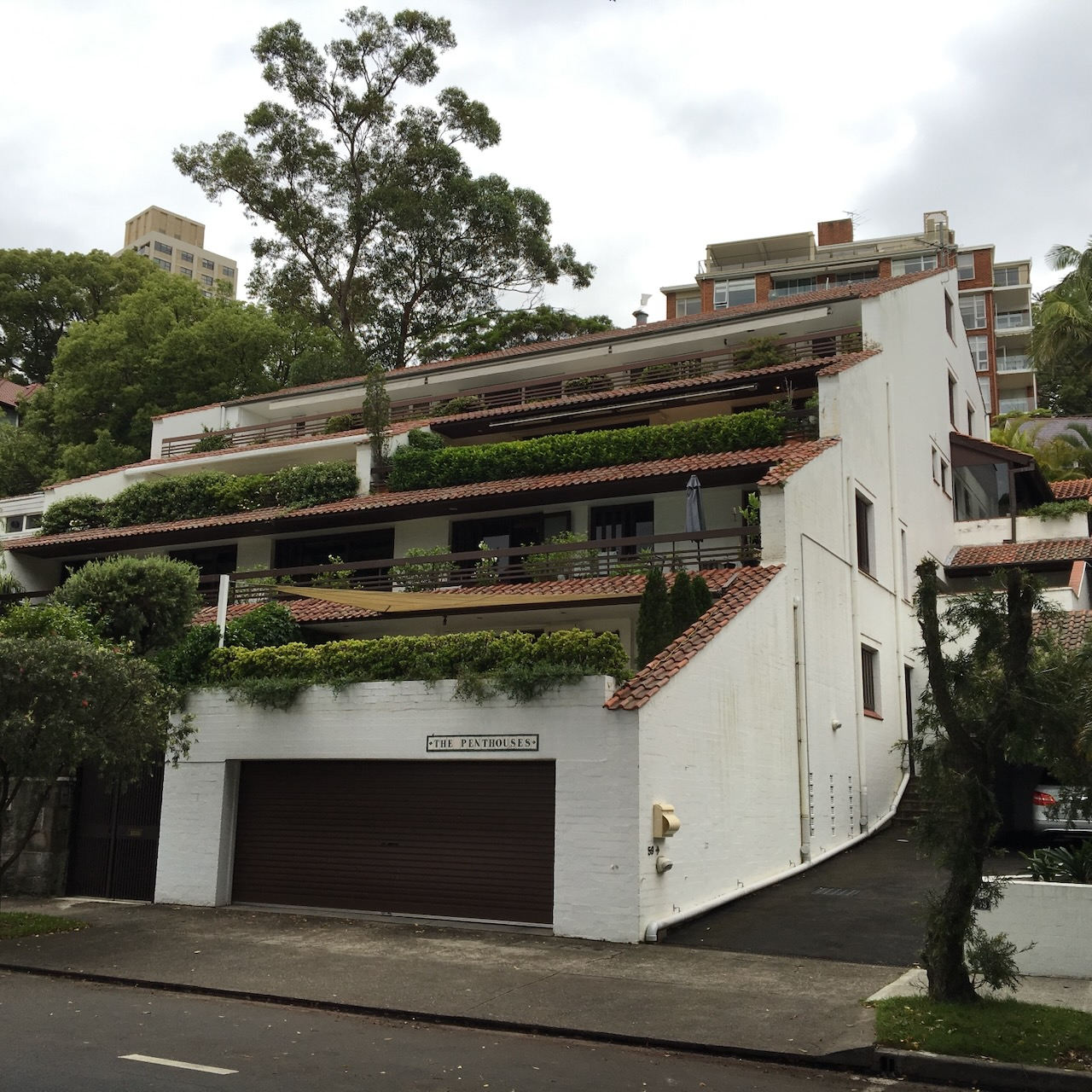
The Penthouses, New Beach Road, Darling Point, 1968.

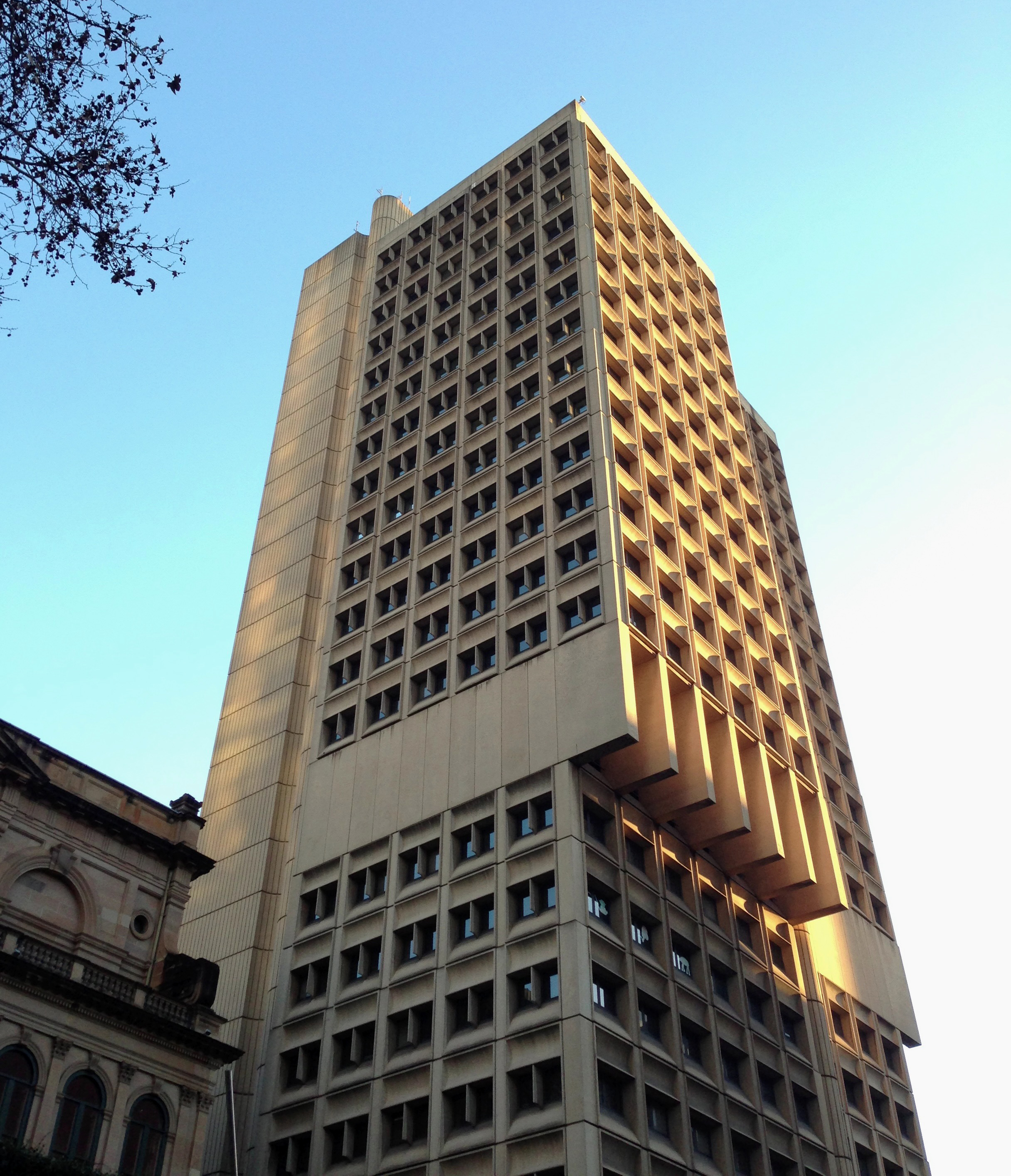
Town Hall House from Druitt Street, Sydney, opened 1977.

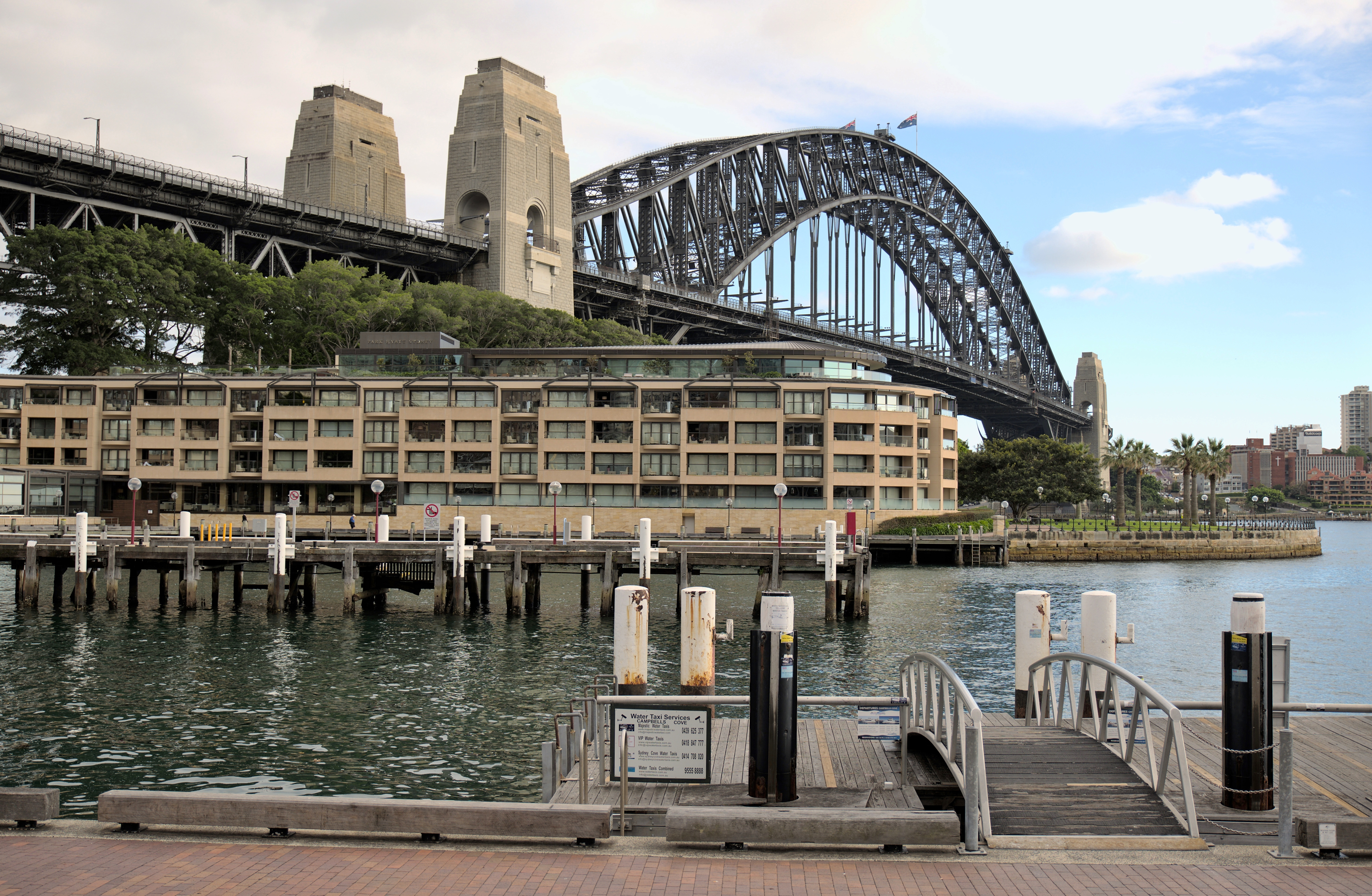
Park Hyatt Sydney, Circular Quay, opened 1987.

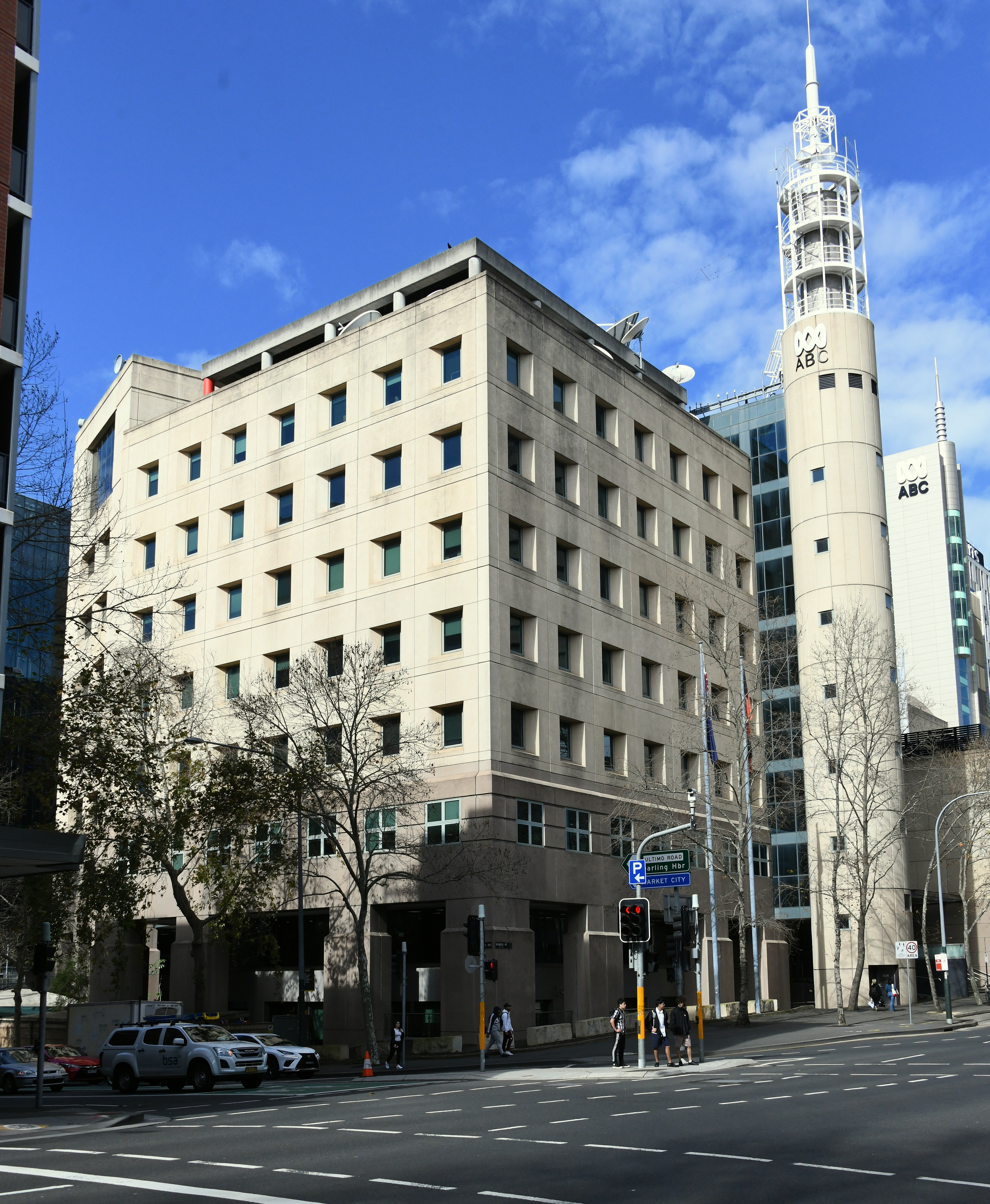
ABC Centre, Ultimo, 1988.

In addition, Ken Woolley worked on notable concrete buildings (Newcastle University Union building and Macquarie University Union building), multi-housing projects (The Penthouses, Darling Point 1967) and buildings of structure and technology (Town Hall House and the Guided Missile Launching System Repair Facility), with many of them picking up various esteemed awards over the following two decades. Among his many notable buildings in Sydney are the headquarters of the Australian Broadcasting Corporation in Ultimo, the Garvan Institute of Medical Research building in Darlinghurst (featuring an iconic DNA-inspired helical staircase), University of Sydney's Fisher Library, the Park Hyatt Sydney, the former State Office Block, Sydney Airport Air Traffic Control Tower and buildings at Sydney Olympic Park. He also worked on stages of State Library Victoria and the Australian Embassy in Bangkok.

Woolley was awarded the highest architectural honour in Australia when he received the RAIA Gold Medal in 1993.

== List of projects ==
Design Architect, Government Architect's Office

- 1955 St. Margaret’s Hospital Chapel, Crown Street, Darlinghurst
- 1956 Chemistry School, University of Sydney, with H.Rembert & P.Webber
- 1957–1962 Fisher Library, University of Sydney
- 1960–1965 State Office Block, Macquarie Street, completed 1967
- 1962 Lidcombe State Hospital Recreation Hall & Chapel

Professional practice with Ancher Mortlock and Woolley

- 1962 Woolley House, Mosman
- 1962–1977 3500 Pettit & Sevitt houses
- 1965–1988 Student Unions at Macquarie, Newcastle and Sydney Universities
- 1968 The Penthouses, Rushcutters Bay
- 1971—1977 Town Hall House and Sydney Square collaboration, Kent Street Sydney
- 1971 National Seventh Day Adventist Church, MacLeay Street & Gould Street, Turner, Canberra
- 1972 Government Housing, Canberra, 600 houses 1972–1982
- 1973 New Australian Embassy, Bangkok. Completed 1978
- 1977 Port Vila, Vanuatu, & Honiara, Solomon Islands, Radio Broadcasting Stations
- 1979 Institute of Criminology Canberra, (competition winner). Unbuilt
- 1980 Woolley House, Cooper Street, Paddington
- 1980–1983 GMLS Assembly and Overhaul Building, Garden Island
- 1982 Australian Federal Police Headquarters, Canberra. Unbuilt
- 1983 National Archives Headquarters, Canberra. Unbuilt
- 1983 The Church of Jesus Christ of Latter-day Saints, Leura
- 1984 Commonwealth Law Courts, Parramatta
- 1984–1986 Woolley House, Palm Beach
- 1985 Exhibition Glass Houses, The Arc, Royal Botanic Gardens
- 1985 Sydney Space Theatre, Power House Museum, Sydney. Unbuilt
- 1986 Hotel at the Opera House, Sydney. Unbuilt
- 1987 Australia Pavilion, Expo 88 Brisbane
- 1987 Park Hyatt Hotel at Campbell’s Cove, Circular Quay, Sydney
- 1988 ABC Radio and Orchestra Centre, Sydney
- 1988 Walsh Bay Waterfront Redevelopment, Sydney. Unbuilt
- 1988 Australia Hellenic War Memorial, Canberra
- 1989 Parliamentary Triangle, Canberra, Urban Design elements
- 1989 Urban Design Controls Civic, Central area, City Hill, Canberra
- 1990 Children's Medical Research Institute, Westmead
- 1991 Exhibition & Sports Halls for Olympics 2000 Bid, Homebush Bay
- 1992 Medium density tropical housing for South Pacific Forum, Nouméa
- 1992 Sand River Golf Club original design, Shenzhen, China
- 1993 Control Tower, Sydney Airport
- 1994 Garvan Institute of Medical Research, Darlinghurst
- 1994 Heritage refurbishment and courtyard infill, Education Department, Bridge Street, Sydney
- 1995 Bloodbank, Parramatta
- 1995 Woolley House, Stewart Street, Paddington. Alterations and additions
- 1996 Exhibition Hall Dome & Olympic 2000 Indoor Sports halls, Homebush Bay
- 1997 Sydney Convention & Exhibition Centre: Link Expansion, Darling Harbour
- 1998 Hockey Stadium, Olympics 2000, Homebush Bay
- 1999 Burswood International Resort Casino expansion, Perth, Western Australia
- 2004 Queen Victoria Building, Sydney. Refurbishment
- 2004 Proposal for a Sydney Music Shell in the Domain
- 2005 Park Hyatt Hotel, Circular Quay. Rooftop suites extension
- 2005 Project Housing, model houses for Landcom, Hoxton Park, Sydney
- 2005 Completion of State Library of Victoria, from 1985 onwards
- 2007 Revival of Pettit & Sevitt project houses, 3 new designs
- 2008 Design for Hindley Street Hotel, Adelaide, with John Diekman
- 2008–2014 Proposal for Large New Opera Theatre at Sydney Opera House
- 2009 Completion of Queen Victoria. Refurbishment
- 2011 Northbourne Avenue, Canberra, Sydney Ancher’s 1960 housing.
- 2011 Refurbishment and intensification
- 2012 Second Proposal for a Sydney Music Shell in the Domain

== Lectures ==
- A.S.Hook RAIA Gold Medal Address Sydney 1994 'State of the Art'
- Walter Burley Griffin Memorial Lecture Canberra 1997 'Give Art a Chance'
- Address 'A Pitch of Magnificence' Academy of Technological Science & Engineering, 2001

== Architecture awards ==
Sir Zelman Cowen Award for Public Architecture [National Award]

- 1986, Cadets Mess, ADFA, Canberra Medallion

Robin Boyd Award [National Award]

- 1987, Woolley House, Palm Beach

Lachlan Macquarie Award for Heritage Architecture [National Award]

- 2005, State Library of Victoria, Adaptive Reuse & Infill Buildings

National Award for Enduring Architecture

- 2022, Woolley Hesketh House, Mosman (1962)

New South Wales Enduring Architecture Award

- 2022, Woolley Hesketh House, Mosman (1962)

Wilkinson Award [NSW State Award]

- 1962, Woolley Hesketh House, Mosman
- 1968, The Penthouses, Rushcutters Bay
- 1982, Woolley House, Paddington
- 1987, Woolley House, Palm Beach

Sir John Sulman Medal [NSW State Award]

- 1963, Fisher Library, University of Sydney, whilst Government Design Architect – Government Architect & T.O'Mahony Joint Architects

Blacket Prize for Regional Architecture [NSW State Award]

- 1967, University of Newcastle Union
- 1969, Staff House, University of Newcastle
- 1987, 'The Anchorage', Tweed Heads

Chapter Award [Victoria State Award]

- 2005, RAIA Victorian Chapter Heritage Award

Civic Design Award

- 1978, Sydney Square, Sydney

Project House Awards

- 1967–1977 Pettit & Sevitt, total of 14 awards

Sir Roy Grounds Award for Enduring Architecture [ACT Award]

- 1997, Seventh Day Adventist Church, Canberra
- 2002, RAIA Headquarters (AWM), Red Hill, Canberra (1967)
- 2010, F.C. Pye Field Environment Laboratory CSIRO, Canberra

Merit Awards for Residential, Commercial, Public, Civic or Adaptive Reuse

- 1972, Wentworth Building, University of Sydney
- 1976, Public Housing, Macquarie Fields
- 1979, Sydney Town Hall Complex
- 1980, Gardens Restaurant, Royal Botanic Gardens, Sydney
- 1980–1983 GMLS Assembly and Overhaul Building, Garden Island
- 1981, Woolley House, Paddington
- 1981, GMLS Workshop, Garden Island, Sydney
- 1982, Amenities Building, Garden Island, Sydney
- 1982, Sydney Square (with Noel Bell-Ridley Smith)
- 1984, Mormon Church, Leura
- 1991, Park Hyatt Hotel, Campbell’s Cove, Sydney
- 1992, ABC Radio and Orchestral Centre, Ultimo, Sydney
- 1993, Children's Medical Research Institute, Westmead

== Personal achievements ==
- 1988, Member of the Order of Australia (AM)
- 1993, Australian Institute of Architects Gold Medal
- 2001, Fellow of the Academy of Technological Science and Engineering
- 2003, Centenary of Federation Medal for services to structural engineering

== Architecture competition winning schemes ==
- 1958 Taubmans Australian 'Low Cost' House Competition, with Michael Dysart
- 1966 Daily Telegraph House
- 1976 Holsworthy Village Centre, Lend Lease
- 1979 Institute of Criminology, Canberra, NCDC
- 1980 Linley Cove Lend Lease Housing Development, Lane Cove
- 1983 Gateway, Circular Quay, Ideas Competition
- 1983 National Archives, Canberra, NCDC
- 1986 Victorian State Library and Museum, Melbourne.
- 1987 Australian/Hellenic War Memorial Competition, Canberra, ACT
- 1987 Campbell’s Cove Hotel Competition, Circular Quay, Sydney
- 1988 Walsh Bay Foreshore Development, jointly
- 1991 Limited Competition, Royal Botanic Gardens Centre

For more comprehensive project list, biography, bibliography, publications see 'Ken Woolley & Ancher Mortlock & Woolley' ISBN 1 86470 0246 The Images Publishing Group.

== Exhibitions ==
- 1963 Sulman and Wilkinson Awards Exhibition, Royal Australian Institute of Architects, Sydney.
- 1964 RAIA Members Exhibition, Sydney.
- 1967 Australian Exhibition, Expo Montreal and
- 1968–1982 RAIA Awards Exhibitions, Sydney and 1987–93.
- 1946–1976 Ancher Mortlock Murray and Woolley, Sydney Architects.
- 1970 Australian Exhibition, Expo Osaka, Japan.
- 1976 Art Gallery of New South Wales, Sydney and Australian Tour, 1977.
- 1980 Engehurst Exhibition RAIA, Pleasures of Architecture Conference.
- 1983 Competition for the Quay, Sydney, Exhibition at RAIA Sydney Convention.
- 1983–1985 'Old Continent New Building', International Travelling Exhibition.
- 1985 'Australian Architects, Ken Woolley', Art Gallery of New South Wales.
- 1985 'Australian Built, Responding to the Place', Art Gallery of New South Wales.
- 1985 Triennale of World Architecture, Belgrade, Yugoslavia.
- 1986 State Library Victoria and Museum Competition Exhibition, Melbourne.
- 1987 Powerhouse Museum, 'Australia by Design' Exhibition.
- 1989 Sydney Harbour Foreshore Development Exhibition, RAIA.
- 1992 Australian Design Excellence, Australian Academy of Design and Foreign Affairs Department, Manila and South East Asia.
- 1993 Powerhouse Museum, Design of the 50s.
- 2002 Drawings by Ken Woolley, New England Regional Art Museum.
- 2003 RAIA Gallery, Tusculum.
- 2009 Exhibition drawings, 'Process' University of Sydney Tinsheds Gallery.
- 2011 Peter Pinson Gallery. Drawings of Paris.
- 2012 Peter Pinson Gallery, Etchings.
- 2013 Simon Chan Gallery, Architects collection of drawings.
- 2014 Simon Chan Gallery, Architects collection of drawings.

== Publications ==
- Monograph: Australian Architects: Ken Woolley, Royal Australian Institute of Architects, 1985
- A.S.Hook RAIA Gold Medal Address,State of the Art, Sydney, 1994
- Walter Burley Griffin Memorial Lecture,Give Art a Chance, Canberra, 1997
- Monograph: The Master Architect Series IV Ken Woolley and Ancher Mortlock & Woolley Selected and Current Works, 1999
- Address A Pitch of Magnificence Academy of Technological Science & Engineering, 2001
- Architect and Artist, Drawings by Ken Woolley, published by Images, 2002
- Author, Reviewing the Performance, The Design of the Sydney Opera House, Watermark Press, 2010
- Author Making Marks, Drawings by Ken Woolley, Watermark Press, 2013

== Writings ==
- "Monograph: The Master Architect Series IV Ken Woolley and Ancher Mortlock & Woolley Selected and Current Works 1999"
- "Art Works – Drawings by Ken Woolley". Published by Images, Exhibition, 2002.
- "Reviewing the Performance, The Design of the Sydney Opera House" Ken Woolley. Watermark Press, 2010
- "Making Marks, Drawings by Ken Woolley" Watermark Press, 2013

== See also ==
- Sydney Ancher
- Bryce Mortlock
- Woolley House
- Wilkinson Award
- Australian Institute of Architects
- Australian Institute of Architects Gold Medal
- Member of the Order of Australia
- Sydney School
