= Flight Data Coordinator =

Flight Data Coordinators (FDCs) are officers in the Airservices Australia that, along with the Air Traffic Controllers, are the human side of The Australian Advanced Air Traffic System (TAAATS).

They are charged with ensuring the data inputted into the Flight Data Processor (FDP) (Flight Plans, changes to flight plans, departures etc.) conform to ICAO DOC 4444 and Australian AIP.

Their duties also include inputting inter-centre messages via the Aeronautical Fixed Telecommunciations Network (AFTN), relay of SARTIME informatation, voice communications with internal and external stake-holders and specialised project work.
