= Woolley House =

Award winning house located in Sydney, Australia designed by Ken Woolley, 1962

Woolley Hesketh House
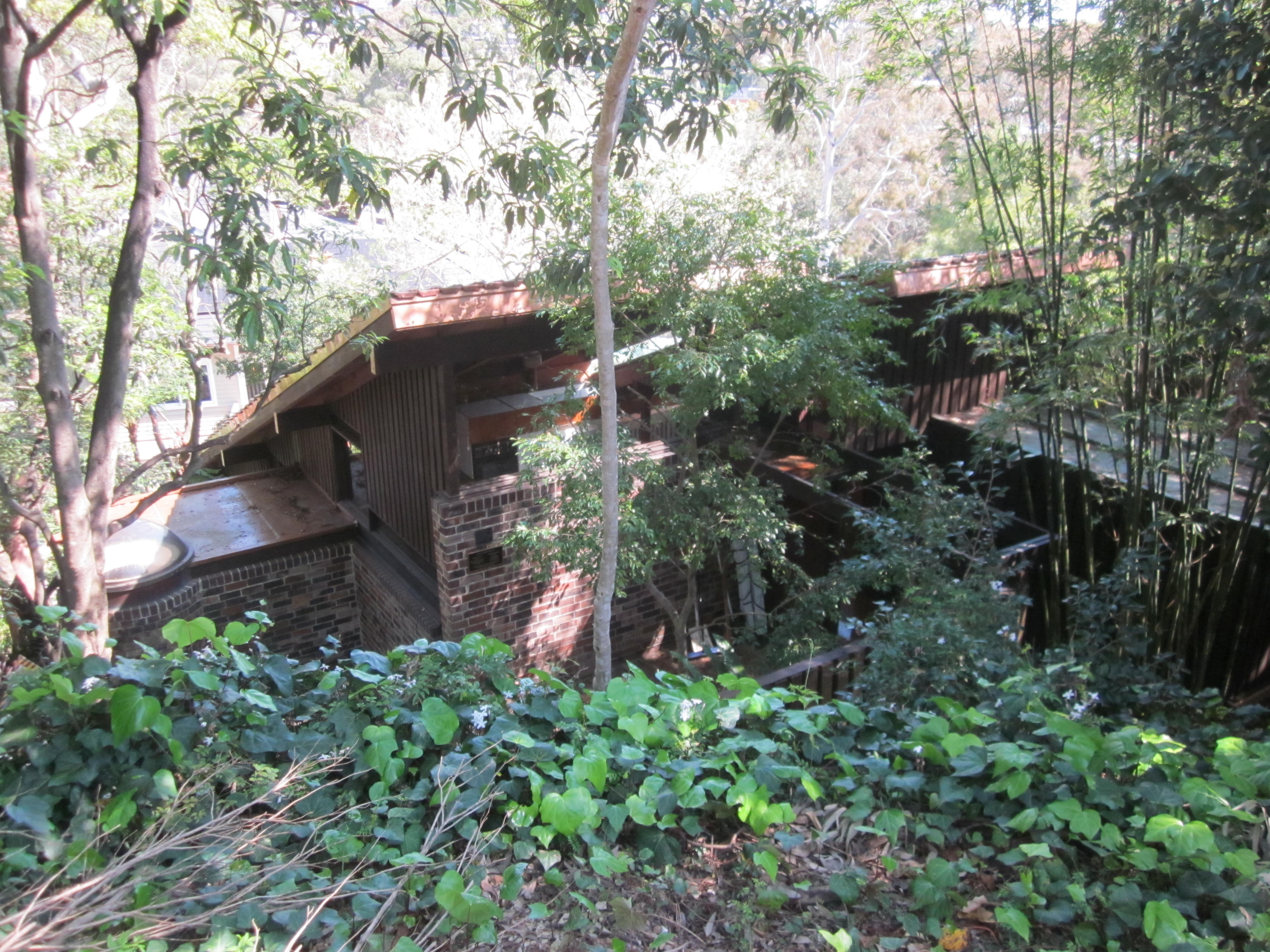
- Woolley House, 34 Bullecourt Ave, Mosman

- Location within inner Sydney
- 33°48′57″S 151°14′27″E
- Location: 34 Bullecourt Avenue, Mosman, Mosman Council, New South Wales, Australia

History
- Design period: 1961
- Built: September 1962
- Built for: Woolley Family

Site notes
- Architect: Ken Woolley
- Architectural style: Sydney School
- Owner: University of NSW, 2016

New South Wales Heritage Register
- Official name: Woolley House
- Type: State heritage (built)
- Designated: 25 May 2001
- Reference no.: 1514
- Type: House
- Category: Residential buildings (private)
- Builders: Pettit, Sevitt and Partners

Woolley House is a heritage-listed residence located at 34 Bullecourt Avenue, Mosman, in the Mosman Council local government area of New South Wales, Australia. It was designed by Ken Woolley and built during 1962 by Pettit, Sevitt and Partners. It was added to the New South Wales State Heritage Register on 25 May 2001. The Woolley House is considered a classic example of the Sydney School style of architecture and was the recipient of the Australian Institute of Architects NSW Chapter Wilkinson Award in the year of its construction, the highest award for housing in New South Wales. In 2016 the house was bequeathed to the University of NSW. In 2022 the house was awarded the National Award for Enduring Architecture by the AIA.

== History ==
The block on which the Woolley House is built was a subdivision of the adjoining land at 11 Bickel Road, Mosman which was approved by Mosman Municipal Council on 26 August 1958. Another block north of the Woolley House's block (the current 34A Bullecourt Avenue) was similarly subdivided off 11 Bickell Road.

11 Bickell Road is an attractive verandahed two-storey Federation bungalow on a large sloping, sandstone terraced site which has been densely planted over much of the 20th century. In the 1950s this large garden won prizes. Late in the 20th century a swimming pool and tennis court replaced some of the lower garden near Bay Street. Jacaranda (J.mimosifolia), Sydney red gum (Angophora costata) and sweet gum (Liquidambar styraciflua) and dawn redwood (Metasequoia glyptostroboides) are among the mature trees on this site. The steeper section at the north/rear was more natural with some large Sydney red gums and regrowth on it. It is this latter section which was subdivided off to create the Woolley House's lot in 1958.

The Woolley House is an example of Ken Woolley's early work before joining Ancher, Mortlock and Murray in 1964. Woolley designed the State Office Block for the NSW Government Architect's Office, as well as Fisher Library at the University of Sydney.

At the time of the house's construction, Sydney had been developed to certain boundaries and most of the flat building sites had been exhausted. Developers therefore set their sights on land previously considered unfit for building (such as the steep bushland on which the Woolley House is built). A new house type that accepted that the land sloped was required for such sites. The split level form minimised the amount of excavation and filling that was required for construction.

This requirement led to amazingly spatially dynamic forms, space vertically through the interiors as well as horizontally. Internal spaces were staggered, a unique approach, and stepped down the sites so that sightlines could angle down and views could be achieved from remote areas of the house. Materials often used were quarry tiles, western red cedar boarding and panelling, clinker or sandstock bricks, polished timber floors, sawn and unfinished timbers. Colour schemes were typically neutral internally to allow the materials and spaces to speak for themselves.

Living spaces were generally open plan, connected but articulated by changes of ceiling height, changes of direction and screening with fittings or elements of the plan. The clever and complex manipulation of space meant that floor areas could be tight while maximising the feeling of space in the house. Visual separation was often achieved by arranging lines of sight to wholly or partially conceal some views (such as views of the kitchen from the living area). Decks and terraces which opened the interior to the exterior were common. Small bedrooms were generally chosen to allow living areas to be maximised.

This style of house became known as the Sydney School, and was used across Australia, but predominantly along the eastern seaboard, mainly around Sydney. This style offered charming and intimate spaces, beautifully crafted with naturally finished materials. It really only became possible at the end of the 1950s to use more interesting building materials as war time difficulties were at an end. Clinker bricks were imperfect and suited the aesthetic of the Sydney School, which was in part a revisiting of the Californian Bungalow aesthetic.

The design ideas were quite radical in one way, but the scale of the spaces and the palate of materials was very warm and human. The Woolley house and the other examples at the time were highly influential and affected the designs of many other contemporary houses, both one-off designs and, more directly, the project homes Ken Woolley went on to design for progressive housing developers, Pettit and Sevitt.

The stone retaining walls in the steep and undulating garden were laid by landscape architect Bruce McKenzie who also did some planting. McKenzie was a pioneer among early landscape practitioners of what would become known as the Sydney school, seeking to enhance Sydney's bush, bring it into gardens or bolster its condition in new development. He would go on to many large public jobs such as the UTS Lindfield / Ku-Ring-Gai campus (former Lindfield TAFE), Botany Bay Foreshore Reserve and others. Examples of McKenzie's private garden work are rare.

The current owners bought the house in 1985 and have retained the bush setting, encouraging regeneration of native species.

In 2014 a plaque was placed on the house, below its Wilkinson Award plaque, to commemorate former owner Yuana Hesketh who lived here from 1985 until 2014, and created the garden as it is now and was devoted to the ongoing conservation of the house. In 2016 the owner Stephen Kenneth Hesketh bequeathed the property to the University of New South Wales to be used as a residence for visiting academics.

== Description ==
The basis of the Woolley House design was derived from a series of garden terraces, most of which were covered by sections of timber roof sloping parallel to the land. A geometric order was applied to the plan as a series of 1.1-square-metre (12 sq ft) units that combine to make up the main central space. Natural materials were exploited, with neutral colour schemes of dark tiles, western red cedar boarding and panelling, and painted bricks, creating a feeling of warmth in the house. The open plan living spaces were connected with volumes containing variations of ceiling height and changes in direction, enabling floor areas to be narrow but for the feeling of space to still be maximised.

=== Site ===
The house is located on a steep hillside, covered with large rocks, trees and ferns and that originally looked out over Middle Harbour. Now, almost 40 years after construction, the site's trees have grown and screen the view.

A key part of the heritage values of the Woolley House as a Sydney School house and garden is its sloping, bush covered, i.e.: treed site, and its informality, it appearing almost as if the house has been "dropped down into" a natural bush setting. To some degree the current natural appearance is the result of Woolley's neglect of the block and natural or bird-induced seed regeneration. To some degree it is due to sympathetic current owners having planted native species and nurtured a sympathetic "bush" setting, albeit with some exotic shade-loving plants such as Begonia spp.

The site is full of winding paths, small and some larger stone retaining walls. Some of these were built by landscape architect Bruce McKenzie, working with Woolley at the time of construction. These and some early plantings McKenzie made, are rare examples of a private job: McKenzie is better known for his large public projects (pers.comm., Ken Woolley; Stuart Read, 13/10/11).

=== House ===
The design derives from an idea of garden terraces, most of which are covered by sections of timber roof which slope parallel to the land.

A geometric discipline was imposed on the plan, the basis of the which is a series of 1.1 square metres (12 sq ft) units, several of which combine to form the main central space. The main bedroom, bathroom and kitchen units open from this central space.

The individual units step sideways and downwards across the slope and the roof sections follow, creating narrow rooflights which serve to make the roof float over the living areas.

Each unit steps aside one point two metres (four feet) (one third its width) to follow the contours of the land, and the same proportion is used to separate the units vertically.

The building's external walls, and several internal walls (which create screens and balustrades which divide the flowing interior) are of clinker brick. The palate of materials is kept to a minimum and was selected to define the individual elements of the structure and its infill. Internally, the structural frame of sawn hemlock is visible. Infill panels are of oiled tallowwood.

Ventilation is provided by the means of solid timber panels which have insect screens fitted externally. The concrete floors were originally covered with cork and matting. The cork remains, but the matting has been replaced with carpet.

=== Condition ===
As at 3 January 2001, archaeological potential is low. The building and its garden setting are in excellent condition, having been carefully maintained by the current owners. The building is in near original condition and thus has a high degree of integrity.

=== Modifications and dates ===
The building is in near original condition. All maintenance and repair works has been carried out in consultation with the original architect.

== Heritage listing ==
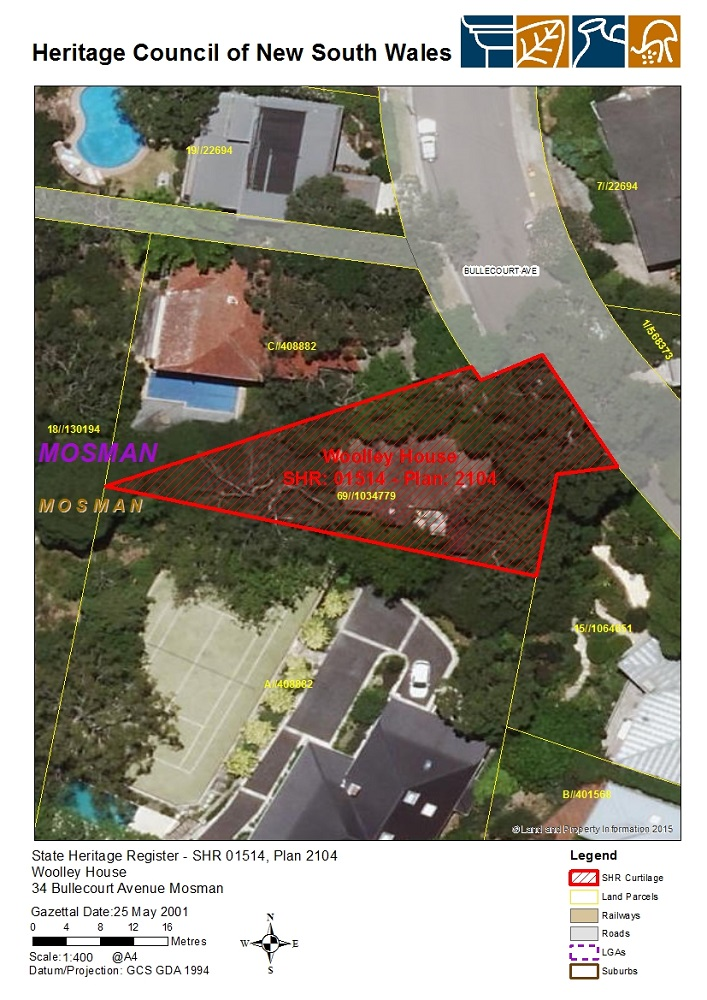
Heritage boundaries

As at 1 June 2015, the Woolley House in its setting is an important early example of the work of Ken Woolley, one of Australia's leading architects since the early 1960s. It is an extremely important example of the "Sydney School" of architecture, using natural materials, stepping down a steeply sloping site. It became an important influence of later houses across Australia, but most particularly in Sydney. A key part of the aesthetic and historic heritage values of the Woolley House as a Sydney School house and garden is its sloping, bush covered, i.e.: treed site, and its informality, it appearing almost as if the house has been "dropped down into" a natural bush setting. Valuing such blocks and seeking to create "bush garden settings" was an integral part of this "School".

Woolley House was listed on the New South Wales State Heritage Register on 25 May 2001 having satisfied the following criteria.

The place is important in demonstrating the course, or pattern, of cultural or natural history in New South Wales.

The Woolley House is an early and classic example of the Sydney School, a movement which was emerging at the time of the building's construction. The building has a strong association with Ken Woolley and is a very important example of his early work, demonstrating his young and idealistic vision. It is an example of Ken Woolley's early work before joining Ancher, Mortlock and Murray in 1964. The site is also a rare example of the garden design (private v public) of landscape architect Bruce McKenzie, a key practitioner in the Sydney School of landscape architecture of that era.

The place has a strong or special association with a person, or group of persons, of importance of cultural or natural history of New South Wales's history.

The site has strong associations with architect Ken Woolley and landscape architect Bruce McKenzie

The place is important in demonstrating aesthetic characteristics and/or a high degree of creative or technical achievement in New South Wales.

The house was a prototype that crystallised theories which were developing at the time. It was soon discovered that it was a style that could be mass-produced as it was modular, economic and honest in its use and expression of materials, in that it didn't rely on covering up the construction which made economic as well as aesthetic sense.

The place has potential to yield information that will contribute to an understanding of the cultural or natural history of New South Wales.

The Woolley House has a high degree of technical / research significance because of the fine-detailing and techniques used in its construction.

The place possesses uncommon, rare or endangered aspects of the cultural or natural history of New South Wales.

The house is one of a small group of "one off" designs for "Sydney School" houses by Ken Woolley. It is also a rare example of the private garden design and construction work of landscape architect Bruce McKenzie, better known for large public projects.

The place is important in demonstrating the principal characteristics of a class of cultural or natural places/environments in New South Wales.

The house is highly representative of the Sydney School in domestic architecture and landscape architecture, popular during the 1960s and 1970s.

== Recognition ==
=== Wilkinson Award, 1962 ===
The Woolley House was the recipient of the RAIA NSW Chapter Wilkinson Award for a house of outstanding merit in 1962, the highest award for housing in New South Wales. Woolley described the house as follows:

Publications about the Mosman House have approached it mainly from its suggested role in the Sydney School, focussing on its design character, materials and siting. I am sometimes quoted as referring to its theme of garden terraces stepping down a hillside, with a sloping roof pulled apart by staggering the terraces and by mentioning direct detailing and references to bungalow-style houses. Robin Boyd used the house as an example of Sydney School, which he described as a "tamed, romantic kind of Brutalism". In acknowledging that as being perhaps more perceptive than he intended, or as others have taken it, I have shown that it is not a straight example of the "New Brutalism" any more than it relates to the designs of other architects whose work, while influenced by Frank Lloyd Wright, is also included in the notion of Sydney School. At the time, I frankly referred aspects of the Mosman House to the Bungalow Style, of which there were many fine examples on hillsides, in Mosman. In doing so, referring to connections to the past, I was running counter to mainstream Modernism, as were architects elsewhere and from whom the Post Modem thinking emerged. I refer particularly to Moore, Esherick, Stirling, Venturi.

At the time, I was reluctant to assert any such thing as a Sydney School, firstly because there was no such group consciously attempting to create a consistent movement. There was a diverse group called the Architectural Society whose members included some architects later referred to as Sydney School. Among the members were some, including me, who had a strong attraction to directness in detail and natural materials without artifice. Those ideas are, of course relative. They were partly a reaction to orthodox modernism, the international Style and to the leading architects of the day. A sub-group, you might say, was the team in Harry Rembert's design room at the NSW Government Architect's Office. We produced a manifesto (unpublished) called Natural Materialism, which was partly wry wit and partly a serious proposal that all materials in building should be expressed in a way that was natural to them, not just that they be unadorned.

The Mosman House represents my thoughts of late 1961. Concurrent work was the State Office Block documentation, the construction detailing and interiors of Fisher Library, the Kingsdene exhibition (at Carlingford) and the early Pettit and Sevitt houses.

The house is designed on a grid of 4 feet and a larger structural grid of 12 feet. The 12 feet square units are staggered in plan by 1/3 stepping back along the contours.

The large grid and its section set up a rhythm like a beat in music, around which a composition of infill elements is composed. While a range of elements is selected, consisting of large glass sheets, small screened ventilation panels, triangular and rectangular boarded infills and sliding doors, in each case of infilling the frame, the particular function of the location creates a variation. The intention is complexity within an ordered discipline.

This was my first use of clinker brick. I had seen it used in a building at Sydney University by Fowell Jarvis and MacClurcan in which the texture was maximised, with projecting lumps and raked joints. Clinker bricks were rejects dumped or used for fill by brickyards because their uneven size and colour made brick laying difficult. But to me, they had texture and colour equivalent to old brick work in Europe and America and they were incredibly inexpensive.

I determined they would be selected by the bricklayers for the relatively smooth side, minimising the texture and enabling the joints to be cut flush and showing a range of beautiful colours.

At the top, however, I used bluelblack bricks which were still being made for repairs to liver-brick bungalow-style houses. These were very uniform and provided a pleasant seat or shelf. Off-form concrete also appears on the stairs and external terraces. The main frame, posts and rafters of the house and the roof decking are of Canadian Pine – similar to Oregon but paler. The window frames, doors and external infill boarding is sawn Tallowwood, internally it is dressed.

All the timber was finished either clear or with a black and umber natural oil stain.

The top level kitchen, entry, dining room and laundry have cork tiles. The lowest floor is Tallowwood.

The main living space is unusually large for a relatively modest size house. The roofs are a kind of pantile, terracotta with a bluish/brown glaze. The reflections and shadows on this roof, the soft textured rose, brown and grey of the bricks and the dark stained boarding are seen through a screen of angophora trees, which vary through the season from soft grey to orange.

— Ken Woolley, The former Woolley House, Mosman. 2004

=== Enduring Architecture Award, 2022 ===
In July 2022, the Woolley Hesketh House — in its 60th year — was awarded the New South Wales Enduring Architecture Award in recognition by the NSW Chapter of the AIA. In November 2022, the Australian Institute of Architects National Awards recognised the house's national significance as an important and enduring work of architecture with the awarding of National Award for Enduring Architecture. The 2022 jury was composed of Adrian Iredale (Western Australia), Poppy Taylor (Tasmania), Caroline Pidcock (New South Wales) and Tim Ross (New South Wales).

Designed to "cope with the slope," the Woolley Hesketh House is a pioneer and icon of the Sydney School movement and contains the DNA of the Australian suburbs of the 1960s and '70s, when architect-designed project homes expressed the desires and dreams of a broad middle class. More importantly, the house reflects a time when our architecture became a central part of how we began to truly discover our sense of Australian identity.

Bequeathed to UNSW Sydney by the final owners, the Heskeths, the house currently lies empty, with its future use remaining unclear. Its current status is a sad indictment on how we view our architectural history in this country. The jury hopes that this award may go a small way toward helping to change this situation.

— Jury Citation, 2022

The award recognises the contribution of the house to Australian architecture, the Sydney School of architecture and influence on generations of architects since.

== See also ==
- Ken Woolley
- Sydney School
- Wilkinson Award
- Australian Institute of Architects Gold Medal
- National Award for Enduring Architecture
- New South Wales Enduring Architecture Award
- Australian residential architectural styles
- List of heritage houses in Sydney
