= State Office Block (Sydney) =

Coordinates: 33.8650°S 151.2121°E

- Interactive map of the State Office Block area

General information
- Type: Government Office Building
- Architectural style: Late twentieth century international
- Location: 88 Phillip Street, Sydney, New South Wales, Australia
- Construction started: 1961
- Completed: 1965
- Opening: 18 September 1967
- Demolished: 1997
- Client: Government of New South Wales

Height
- Roof: 128 m (420 ft)

Technical details
- Floor count: 38

Design and construction
- Architect: Ken Woolley
- Architecture firm: NSW Government Architect's Office
- Engineer: Taylor Thomson and Whitting
- Main contractor: Concrete Constructions

The State Office Block was a landmark modernist skyscraper complex on a block bounded by Phillip, Bent and Macquarie streets in the Sydney central business district. Completed in 1965 and designed in the modernist International style by Ken Woolley from the NSW Government Architect's Office, the 128-metre-high building (known colloquially as the "Black Stump") took the title of the tallest building in Australia from the nearby AMP Building until 1967, the 170 metre Australia Square tower was completed. Designed to hold offices of the NSW Government, including the cabinet and the Premier's office, the State Office Block was demolished in 1997 to make way Aurora Place.

== History ==
The State Government Office Block was the culmination of a much grander and ambitious plan by the NSW Government of Bob Heffron to remodel and redevelop Macquarie Street and Parliament House into a grand modernist-style government precinct, including several new office towers for the state government. This however, never eventuated, and by early 1961 this scheme had been substantially reduced to comprise the State Office Block on the Bent Street/Macquarie Street block occupied by the government-owned 1870s Government Printing Office building and the 1820s Australian Subscription Library, with a final design at 400-feet-high approved by the Height of Buildings Committee in January 1961.

In 1962 the government called for tenders for the new 420 ft (130 m) office block to hold government offices, on the block bounded by Phillip, Bent and Macquarie streets. This contract was subsequently won in November 1962 by Perini Australia to a cost of £5.8 million, being the largest architectural contract entered into by the Department of Public Works at the time. The NSW Government Architect's Office's Ken Woolley designed a 38-floor tower of composite concrete and steel with deep window recesses clad in black granite. Woolley's design accounted for the sun-exposure for such a tall building by including measures such as floor slabs projecting beyond the window line to make sunhoods, which were clad in bronze sheeting. Woolley also designed the interiors which were influenced by Scandinavian modernism exemplified by the use of modular furniture. The lift lobby leading for the Premier's office floor was decorated by a double-sided oxidised bronze Coat of Arms of New South Wales by sculptor Bert Flugelman.

The building was completed at a total cost of over A£7 million. The office of the Premier moved into the building from the old Treasury Building, and State Cabinet meetings were held in the top-floor cabinet room. The State Office Block was the first major office building erected for the NSW Public Service since 1927 and provided accommodation for six departments: the Premiers Department, The Treasury and the departments of agriculture, local government, mines and public works. The building was topped out in 1965 and was officially opened on 18 September 1967 by Premier Bob Askin.

== Demolition ==
By the late 1980s the office block remained in use, but discussion over its future began when government policy shifted to leasing rather than owning office space. In 1987 Premier Barrie Unsworth raised the potential of state-owned CBD buildings being sold and converted to hotels to increase tourist accommodation in the city and dismissed suggestions that the State Office Block be retained, saying: "We will always retain the heritage buildings but there is no real reason why we should retain the State Office Block". The State Office Block nevertheless survived into the 1990s, with heated discussion continuing over its future, but it was "considered old enough to be outdated, yet too young to be of heritage value" and was sold to Lendlease for demolition in 1996, to be replaced by the Renzo Piano-designed Aurora Place. Lendlease noted that the government sold the complex in full knowledge of the company's desire to demolish it and that the State Office Block was full of asbestos, was not energy efficient, and the air conditioning system was outdated and required extensive replacing. Ken Woolley, who had led a bid to have the existing building converted into a hotel, advocated in vain for its conservation, noting in a letter to the Sydney Morning Herald in August 1996:

Commercially, it may make sense to demolish the State Office Block. Historically and aesthetically, it does not. It is the government, by selling without restriction, which is causing the demolition of what it had the duty to conserve by its own legislation.

Renzo Piano can design a building as well as any Australian Architect and it would be great to have his work in place of one of our holes or other disasters the councils have allowed.

To supplant the State Office Block by an equally good, even if more up-to-date, building is exactly the same as scraping the paint off a Whiteley to provide a canvas on which to paint a Hockney.

The State Office Block has enclosed asbestos, as do all the buildings of its era, but is safe to occupy in its present form. Two years ago the government designed, documented and tendered on complete refurbishment which would preserve the building.

The price of conservation is to forgo profit, which the community expects of Government."

In a similar vein, prominent heritage architect Clive Lucas decried the "tragedy" that "quality development seems only to take place where excellence already exists. The State Office is a building of great distinction and it is not really satisfactory to justify its demise by getting an international architect to design a better building for the site." By contrast, the Herald's architecture critic, Anne Susskind, praised the choice of Piano expressing that his appointment was "a welcome break from the awful sameness in design to which Sydney has been subject."

On the opening of Aurora Place in November 2000, an article in the Sydney Morning Herald recognised the contention over the State Office Block's demolition, noting that many architects deplored its demolition and quoting architecture Professor James Weirick, who lamented that it was "very unfortunate they demolished the State Office Block, which was a very fine building of the 1960s, one of the great achievements of the Government Architect's office." However a later review a few years later observed that while "there were murmurings in architectural circles" against its demolition, there was "little discernible public disquiet at the loss of the 'Black Stump'". A sculpture by Margel Hinder, "Growth Forms" (1959), that had been placed in the forecourt of the Office Block in 1980 when its original site was demolished, was again moved as a result of demolition, and is now on display in the UTS Tower following acquisition by the university and the Art Gallery of New South Wales.

== See also ==
- List of tallest buildings in Sydney
- List of tallest voluntarily demolished buildings
