= Airservices Australia =

Australian air navigation service provider

Agency overview
- Formed: 6 July 1995
- Preceding agency: Civil Aviation Authority (CAA)
- Jurisdiction: Civil Aviation Act 1988, Air Services Act 1995, Airspace Act 2007
- Headquarters: Alan Woods Building, 25 Constitution Avenue, Canberra, Australian Capital Territory, Australia
- Employees: 3,423 (June 2024)
- Annual budget: $1,053 million (income, FY2024)
- Minister responsible: Catherine King, Minister for Infrastructure and Transport
- Agency executives: Anne T. Brown, Chairperson; Rob Sharp, Chief Executive Officer
- Website: www.airservicesaustralia.com

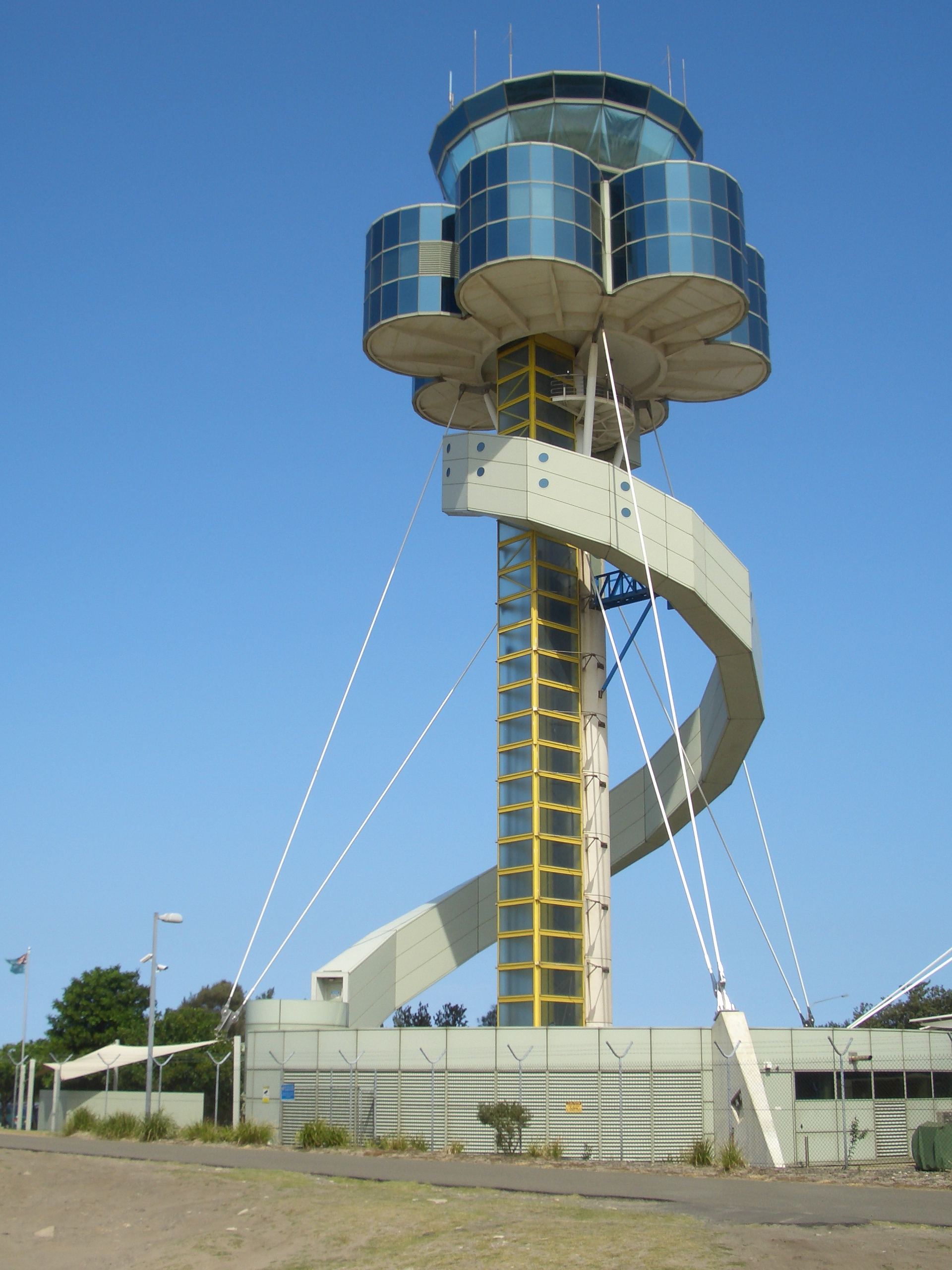
Sydney Airport Control Tower

Airservices Australia is an Australian Government–owned corporation, responsible for providing services to the aviation industry within the two Australian flight information regions (FIRs). Some of Airservices Australia’s responsibilities include air traffic control, airway navigation, communication facilities, publishing aeronautical data, airport rescue, and fire-fighting services. Airservices Australia has international partnerships with ICAO, CANSO and IATA.

== Responsibilities ==
Airservices Australia manages air traffic within Australian airspace. This includes the airspace over continental Australia, territorial waters and also international airspace boundaries over the Pacific and Indian Oceans. Airservices Australia also manages upper-level airspace (above 24,500 ft) under contract to the neighbouring Pacific Island Flight Information Regions of the Solomon Islands and Nauru.

Airservices Australia publishes aeronautical data, maintains telecommunications infrastructure, radio navigation aids, updates flight procedures and provides emergency services, including the Aviation Rescue Fire Fighting services at 26 of Australia's busiest airports.

The agency is fully funded by direct charges to the aviation industry and controlled by a board of directors, accountable to the Australian Parliament through the Minister for Infrastructure and Transport. The Chair of Airservices Australia Board is Anne T. Brown. The Chief Executive Officer is Rob Sharp, who was appointed on a four-year term in January 2025, replacing Jason Harfield. The agency maintains more than 4,000 skilled aviation professionals, including air traffic controllers, engineering specialists, technicians and support staff working from two major control centres, 29 air traffic control towers and firefighting stations at 26 of Australia's busiest airports.

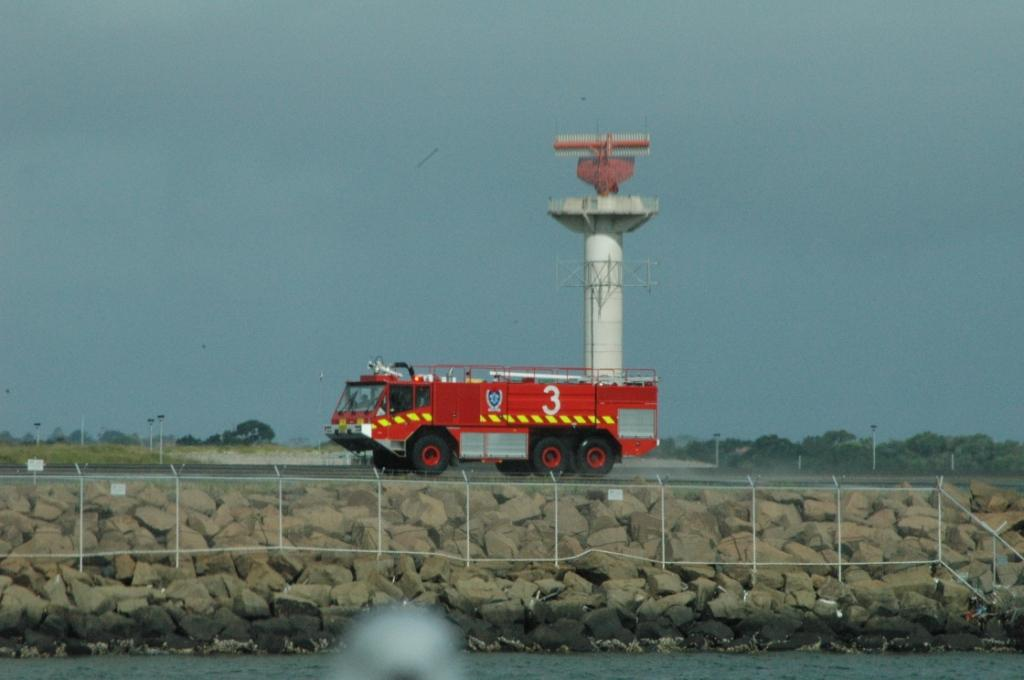
An Airservices Australia fire appliance travelling beside the runway at Sydney Airport on 5 January 2008

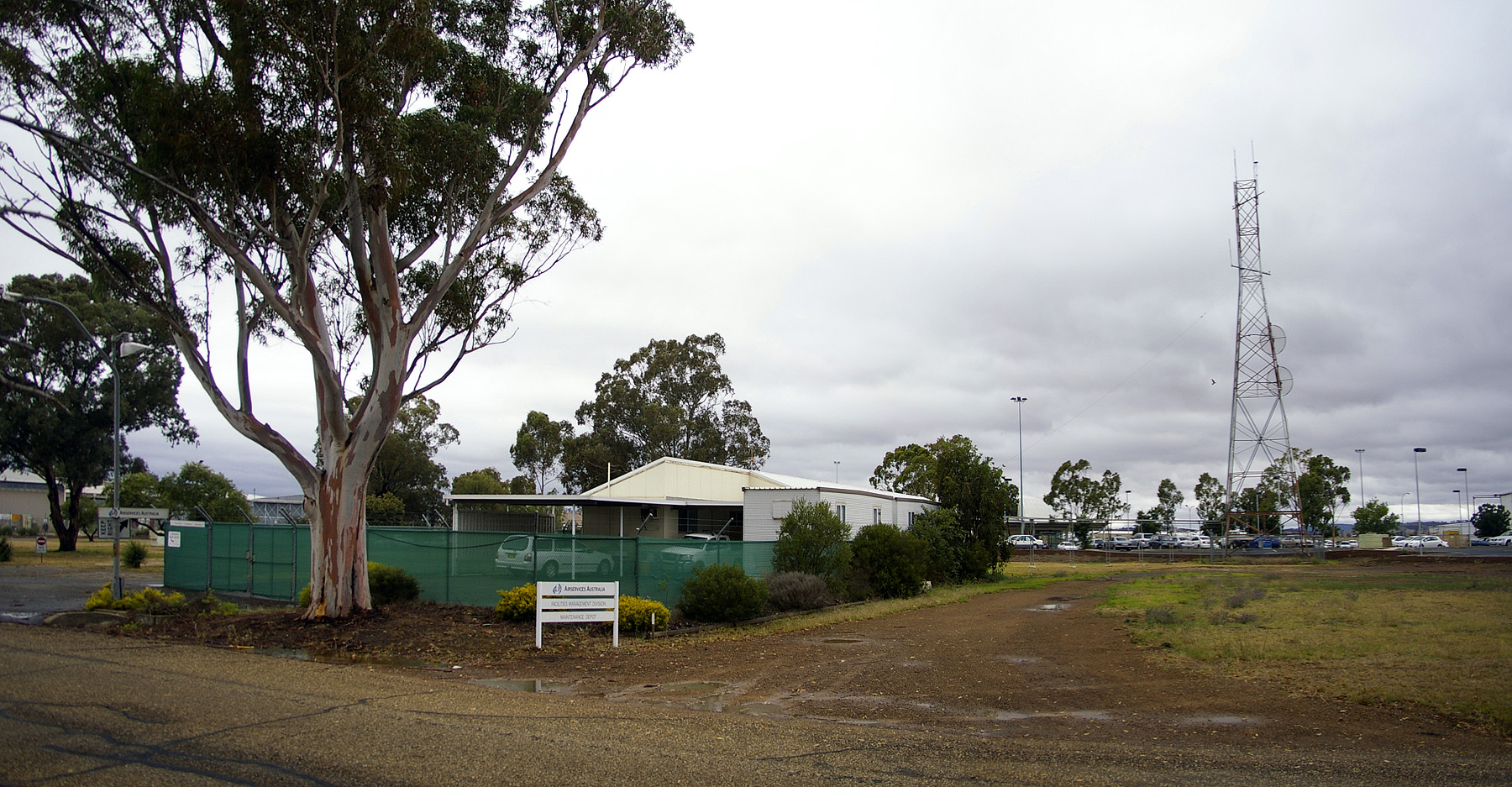
Airservices Australia Technical Services Maintenance Depot at Wagga Wagga Airport.

== Air traffic control operations ==
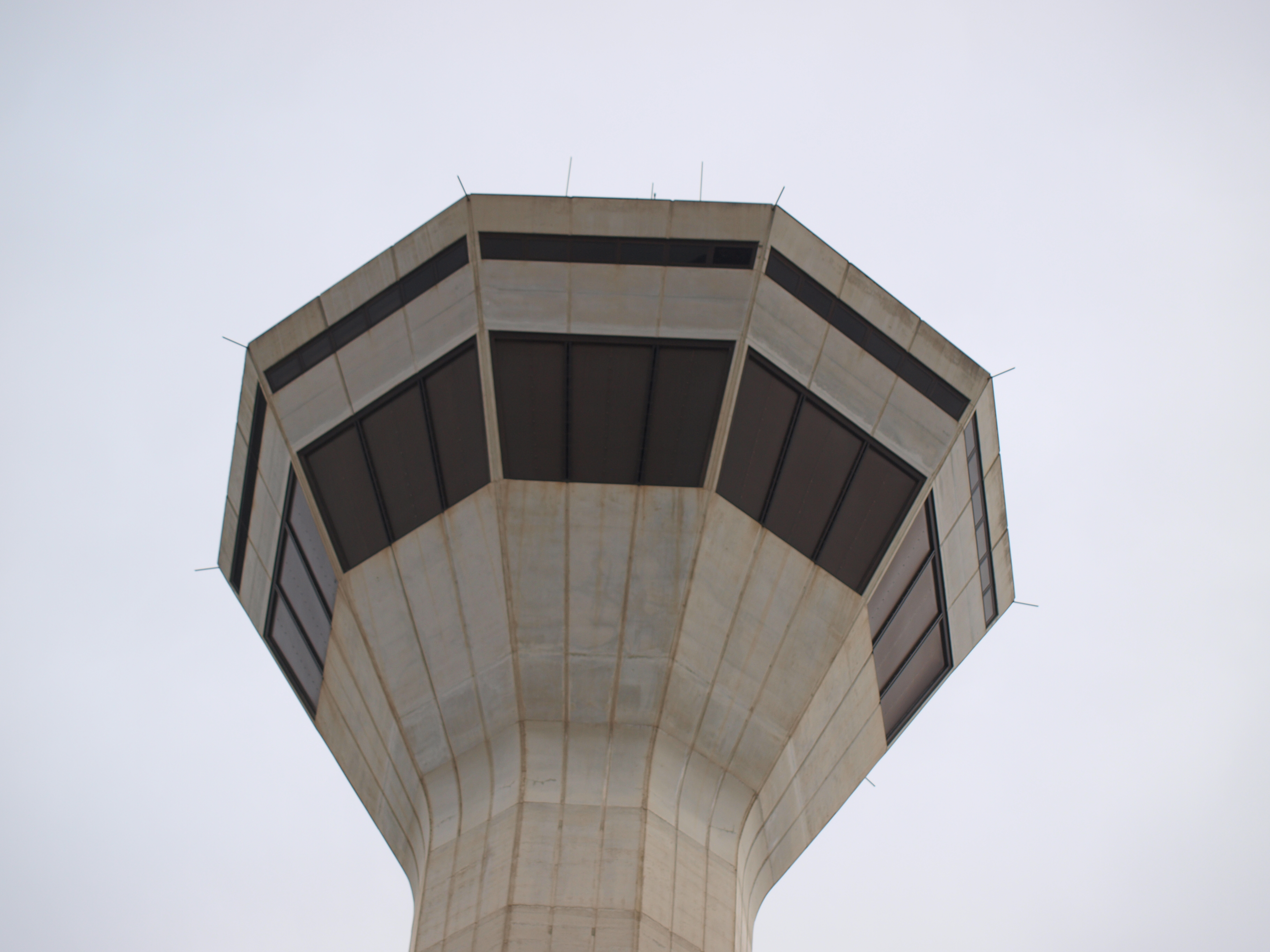
A close up of the Perth Airport Control Tower, focusing on the top of the tower, as seen from the T1 car park in 2025

Airservices Australia has 29 air traffic control towers and two air traffic control centres based in Brisbane and Melbourne. Australia has two Flight Information Regions which are managed by these centres. All airspace to the north of the dividing boundary (YBBB) is controlled by Brisbane Centre and all airspace to the south of the boundary (YMMM) is controlled by Melbourne Centre. These centres cover the whole of Australia with the exception of Perth and Sydney Terminal Control Units as well as the towers at major airports. In addition, Melbourne Centre is responsible for managing traffic handovers from South Africa, Mauritius, Sri Lanka, Maldives, Indonesia and New Zealand. Brisbane Centre manages traffic handovers from neighbouring flight information regions including East Timor, Papua New Guinea, Fiji and the United States.

En-route controllers (also referred to as Area/Centre Controllers) located in Brisbane and Melbourne are responsible for all aircraft flying at upper levels above 25,000 ft (7,600 m). These controllers are responsible for the majority of air traffic over the Australian mainland and on oceanic routes within Australia's flight information regions.

In 1999, the agency commenced using The Australian Advanced Air Traffic System (TAAATS), a computerised air traffic control system covering all sectors of Australian air space.

In 2013, Airservices was ranked among the world's best as part of an international safety benchmarking study undertaken by the Civil Air Navigation Services Organisation (CANSO). The study placed Airservices in second place for air navigation service providers (ANSP) in relation to the maturity of the organisation's Safety Management System, with a score of more than 90% effectiveness.

== History ==
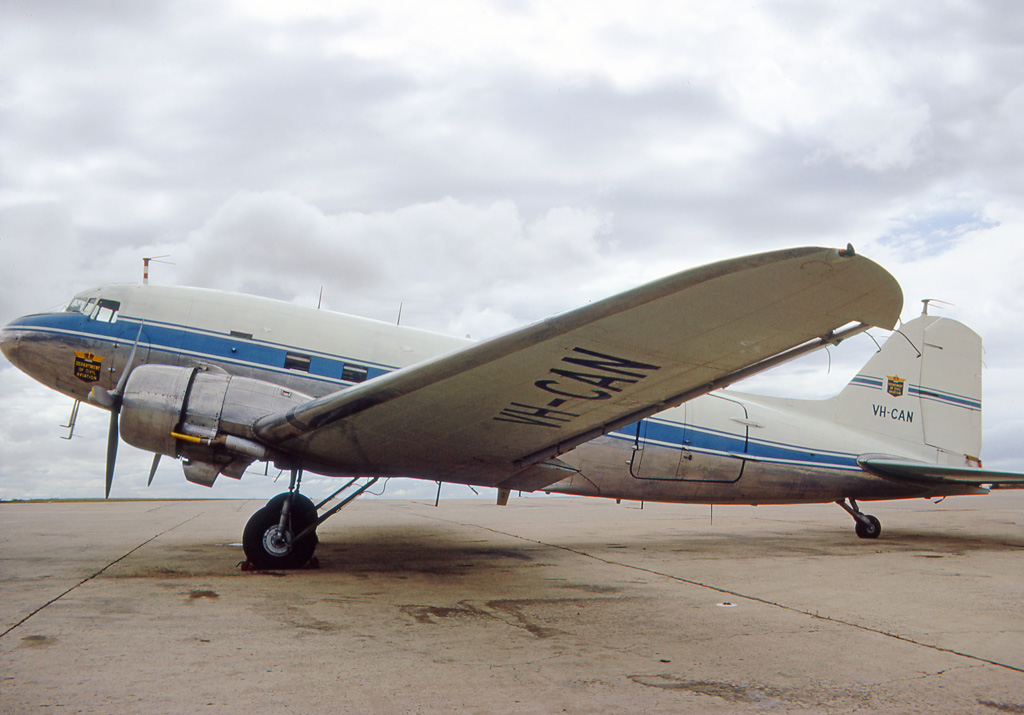
Department of Civil Aviation Douglas C-47A at Melbourne Essendon in 1971. The DCA shield is on the side of its nose

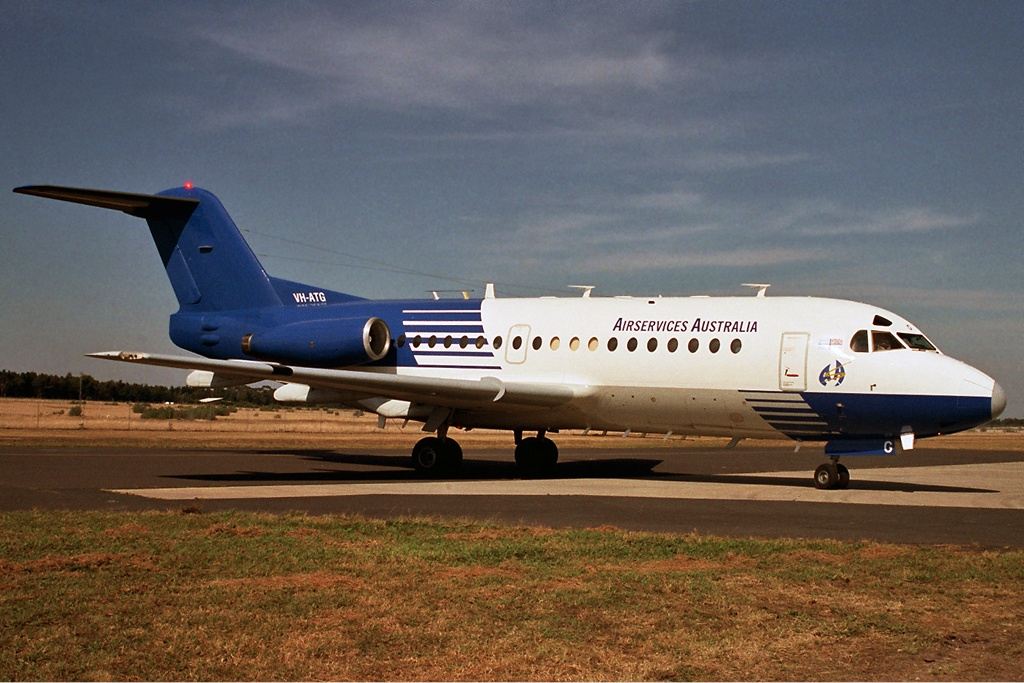
Airservices Australia Fokker F28.

The Civil Aviation Branch of the Department of Defence was established on 28 March 1921, after Parliament passed the Air Navigation Act 1920 in December 1920. The organisation was reformed as a separate Government Department, the Department of Civil Aviation (DCA), on 14 November 1938 after the enquiry into the crash of the DC-2 aircraft Kyeemah in 1938. Arthur Corbett was appointed director-general of Civil Aviation in April 1939, serving until his retirement in August 1944. From June 1946 to December 1955 the director-general was Richard Williams, formerly RAAF Chief of the Air Staff. Donald Anderson held the position of director-general from January 1956 until September 1973.

On 30 November 1973 the DCA merged with the Department of Shipping and Transport and became the Department of Transport, Air Transport Group. This group was again reformed as its own Department on 7 May 1982, the Department of Aviation (DOA). Another merger took place on 24 July 1987 when the DOA was absorbed by the Department of Transport and Communications. On 1 July 1988 the Civil Aviation Authority (CAA) was formed to control aviation safety regulation and provide air traffic services.

=== 1995 split ===
The CAA was split into two separate government organisations in July 1995: Airservices Australia and the Civil Aviation Safety Authority (CASA). Airservices Australia took responsibility for airspace management, aeronautical information, communications, radio navigation aids, airport rescue firefighting services, and aviation search and rescue, while CASA assumed control of safety regulations, licensing of pilots and aviation engineers, and certification of aircraft and operators. The role of aviation search and rescue was transferred from Airservices Australia to the Australian Maritime Safety Authority in 1997.

== OneSky ==
Since 2015, Thales Australia has been contracted to provide a replacement for TAAATS. The program will be a joint civil-military air traffic management system, called OneSKY, based on the Thales TopSky system.

== Industrial and legal actions ==
=== 1997 tender for air traffic system operations ===
Following a dispute over tender evaluation, the Federal Court of Australia found in 1997 that CAA had failed to evaluate tender submissions in line with the implied duty of good faith and fair dealing which bidders were entitled to expect. The judge, Finn J, commented in his judgment that

Fair dealing is a major (if not openly articulated) organising idea in Australian law ... The implied duty is, as is well known, an accepted idea in the contract law of the United States... Its status in civil law is well recognised...[and a] more open recognition in our own contract law is now warranted.

=== 2009 ATC industrial dispute ===
Airservices Australia entered negotiations with the Air Traffic Control union Civil Air in early 2008 to form a new collective agreement. As negotiations continued, ATC staff shortages were said to contribute to what was the worst year on record for flight delays and cancellations, but had been earlier defended by Airservices CEO Greg Russell as having been caused by a group of "renegade air traffic controllers" who had been responsible for airspace closures in a form of covert industrial action.

Despite claims by the union that the problem was caused by a shortage of controllers, the figures provided by Airservices show the average number of controllers has not changed significantly over the previous three years.

Complaints by airline Virgin Blue culminated in a demand for $500,000 compensation in October 2008. An attempt by Airservices to define obligatory reasonable overtime for its controllers failed in the AIRC in late December 2008.

Remaining differences in position regarding wages and sick leave resulted in threatened industrial action by late January 2009. High-level intervention of CEO Greg Russell and ACTU President Sharan Burrow in the negotiations produced an offer which averted industrial action and was endorsed almost unanimously by the Air Traffic Controllers.

The collective agreement negotiation saw 83% of staff register their vote, with 95 per cent voting for the agreement. The new agreement led to a pay increase of 4.3% per annum over 3.5 years with changes to sick leave and rostering arrangements.

As of September 2009, Air Traffic Control staffing problems continued to disrupt the ability of Airservices Australia to provide its core function, precipitating an unprecedented cancellation of leave for the entire Sydney approach control unit for three months.

In its 2010–13 Workforce Plan, Airservices claimed that as of December 2009 the required number of operational ATC staff were available, reflecting the impact of a significant increase in recruitment and training throughout 2008–09. Airservices further plans to recruit close to 100 ATC trainees annually to 2013 to offset the impact of retirements and resignations.

In 2013, an independent review of air traffic controller numbers at Airservices by air navigation services provider, NAV CANADA, confirmed that the organisation had the appropriate number of operational air traffic controllers to meet its requirements.

=== 2010 alleged sexual harassment and bullying court action ===
On 28 July 2010 a Federal Court action was brought against Airservices Australia by two air traffic controllers employed by the agency for alleged bullying and sexual harassment within the workplace.

=== 2019 culture review by Elizabeth Broderick ===
In August 2019 following media publicity over complaints of ongoing sexual harassment, Airservices engaged Elizabeth Broderick and Co. to conduct a culture review.

=== 2026 Sydney Airport near misses and staff shortages ===
In July and August 2026, three near misses at Sydney Airport were reported to the Australian Transport Safety Bureau (ATSB). This included a Qantas flight and QantasLink flight on 27 July. On 9 August, a Jetstar A320 and a Qatar Airways 777 narrowly avoided collision while taxiing.

Hours after the Jetstar/Qatar incident, a Virgin 737 was cleared for takeoff on runway 34L before aborting due to a Qantas 737 taxiing across the runway further ahead. Airservices Australia CEO Rob Sharp confirmed the delayed report, stating "We don't think the threshold for reporting was actually met" as the Virgin plane remained stationary; however, the footage showed the Virgin plane had started rolling for takeoff.

Following these incidents, emergency meetings were held between Air Services Australia and federal Transport Minister Catherine King. It was acknowledged that staff shortage contributed to these incidents. At the time of report, six tower controllers are in training and a further 15 are commencing training before the end of the year. As of 14 August, all three incidents are under investigation by the ATSB.

== See also ==
- Australian Air Traffic Control
- Australian Transport Safety Bureau
- Civil Air Navigation Services Organisation
- Department of Infrastructure, Transport, Regional Development, Communications, Sport and the Arts
- GNSS augmentation
- National Council for Fire & Emergency Services
