= Aurora Place =

Office skyscrapter in Sydney, Australia

Coordinates: 33°51′53.89″S 151°12′43.03″E

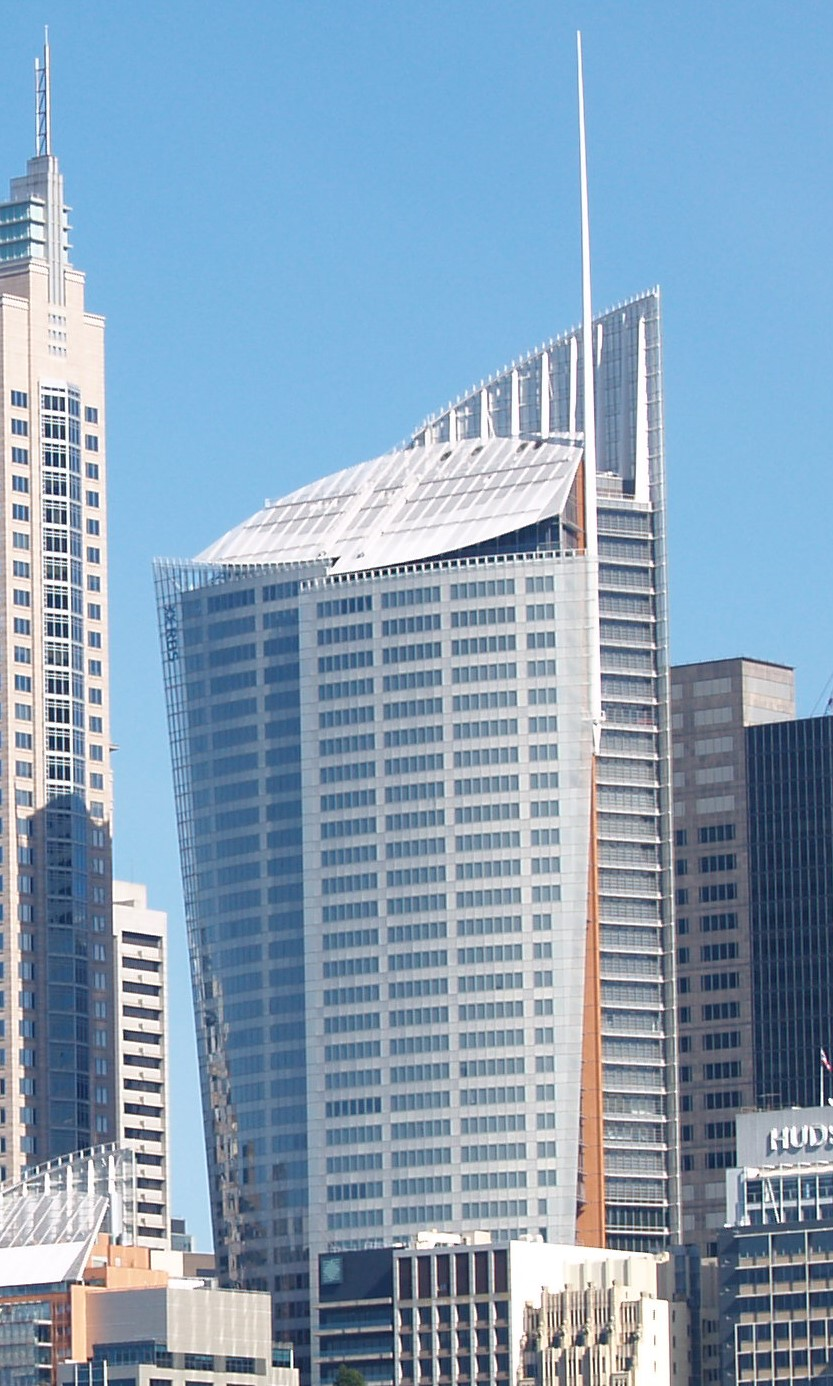
- Interactive map of the Aurora Place area

General information
- Type: Commercial skyscraper
- Location: 88 Phillip Street, Sydney, Australia
- Construction started: 1998
- Completed: 2000

Height
- Architectural: 218 m (715 ft)
- Roof: 188 m (617 ft)

Technical details
- Floor count: 41
- Floor area: 49,500 m^{2} (533,000 sq ft)

Design and construction
- Architects: Renzo Piano Building Workshop in association with Innovarchi Architects, Sydney and Lend Lease Design
- Developer: Lendlease
- Structural engineer: Arup Group
- Awards and prizes: Sir John Sulman Medal, 2004; Property Council of Australia Rider Hunt Award, 2002

Website
- www.auroraplace.com.au

Aurora Place is a commercial skyscraper and residential block on Phillip Street in Sydney, Australia. Designed by Renzo Piano, the 41-storey building stands at a height of 218 m (715 ft) high to the top of the spire and 188 m (617 ft) to the roof.

The building has an unusual geometric shape where not one panel is parallel to any grid. The east façade bulges out slightly from its base, reaching its maximum width at the top floors. The curved and twisted shape of east façade is aimed to correspond spatially with Sydney Opera House and to represent the sublime marine environment of the harbour. The exterior glass curtain-wall extends beyond the main frame, creating an illusion of its independence. The steel spire attached to the north facade is 75 metres in length.

Uniquely for an office building of its size and age, Aurora Place features a number of winter gardens, providing natural environments for the building's tenants. These winter gardens are located in the North West and South East corners of the tower floor place, facing Sydney Harbour and the adjacent botanical gardens, with sophisticated operable louvre facades.

Aurora Place also features a significant collection of art on public display, reported to be among the most valuable corporate art commissions in Australia. Artists featured at Aurora Place include Kan Yasuda, Caio Fonseca and Tim Prentice.

== History ==
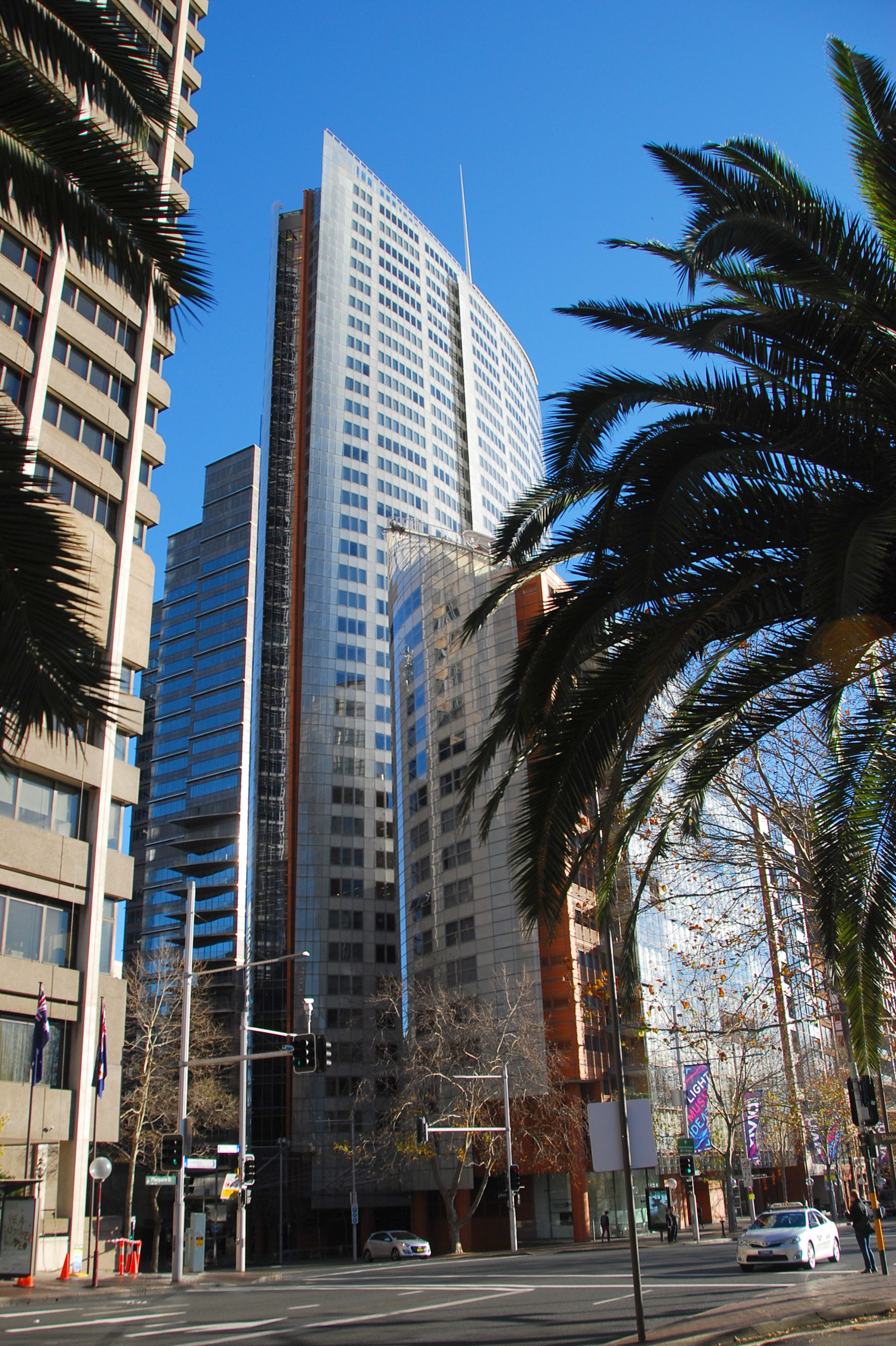
Aurora Place from the south

The building was built on the site of the former State Office Block by Bovis Lend Lease. The assumptions of a planned tower were first presented to the Central Sydney Planning Committee in 1996, when three main architects: Mark Carroll, Shunji Ishida and Renzo Piano put forward the innovative project. The building was sold in January 2001 for $485 million. Aurora Place was the winner of prestigious 2002 Property Council of Australia Rider Hunt Award, handled out for technical and financial qualities. On 2 June 2009, French urban climber Alain Robert scaled this building in protest against climate change.

== Construction materials ==
Materials that are used for this building were unique compared to its neighbours, Chifley Tower and Governor Phillip Tower. The façade which makes up the primary component of the building is the milky white fritted glass which has been laminated. The aesthetics of the material gives a visual metaphor of a sail. It is inspired by the tiling of the Sydney Opera House, which is 800 metres (less than half a mile) to the north. Terracotta tiles makes up much of the lower section of the building to contrast the white dominated glass cladding. It also reconciles the orange-clad lobby and the residential complex.

A number of international law firms, namely Jones Day (level 41) and Squire Patton Boggs (level 17), are tenants in the building, as well as the world’s largest management consulting firm, McKinsey & Company (level 35).

== See also ==
- Skyscrapers in Sydney
- List of tallest buildings in Australia
