= Forward Degree College =

- Motto: Education for New Millennium
- Type: Private College
- Established: 1999
- Founders: Muhammad Shafi Sabir(Late)
- Affiliations: BISE Peshawar; BTE Peshawar; University of Peshawar
- Location: Peshawar, KPK, Pakistan
- Website: www.forward.edu.pk

Forward Degree College (abbreviated as FDC) (Pashto: فورورډ ‌ډيګري کولېج, Urdu: فارورڈ ڈگری کالج) is a part of Forward System which is started after the establishment of Pakistan in 1949 to fill the vacuum created by closure of Non-Muslim educational institute in Peshawar after 1947. Forward Degree College is one of private colleges affiliated with University of Peshawar.

== History ==
Forward System was started by a worker of independence movement, Social Worker, Journalists, writer of many books and devoted educationist, of Khyber Pakhtunkhwa (KPK), Professor Muhammad Shafi Sabir in 1949 with Forward Schools in Peshawar City as a modest venture in private sector.

== Forward System at Glance ==
| Forward At A GLANCE | Established in | Registered/Recognized By |
|---|---|---|
| Forward High School (for Girls); Asamai Gate, Peshawar City. | 1950 | Affiliated with BISE, Peshawar. |
| Forward High School (for Boys); Karimpura, Peshawar City. | 1967 | Affiliated with BISE, Peshawar. |
| Forward Public School (for Girls); G-2, Phase-2, Hayatabad, Peshawar. | 1993 | Affiliated with BISE, Peshawar. |
| Forward Model School (for Boys); L-2, Phase-3, Hayatabad, Peshawar. | 1996 | Affiliated with BISE, Peshawar. |
| Forward High School; Rashidabad, Peshawar. | 1999 | Affiliated with BISE, Peshawar. |
| Forward Degree College (for Boys); H-3, Phase 2, Hayatabad, Peshawar. | 1999 | Affiliated with University of Peshawar, BISE and Board of Technical Education. |
| Forward Girls College; E-2, Phase-1, Hayatabad, Peshawar. | 2002 | Affiliated with BISE, Peshawar. |
| Forward Model School; Saeedabad, Peshawar. | 2006 | Affiliated with BISE, Peshawar. |
| Forward Public School; Dalazak Road, Peshawar. | 2007 | Affiliated with BISE, Peshawar |
| Forward Public School; Ring Road, Peshawar. | 2018 | Affiliated with BISE, Peshawar |
