= The Australian Advanced Air Traffic System =

The Australian Advanced Air Traffic System (TAAATS; tarts or tahts), is the hardware and software system used by Airservices Australia for air traffic control services. It is a paperless, computer-based system, which serves as an aid to civilian air traffic controllers. It does not control aircraft, but gives the user a display of information about an aircraft's position and associated information. It also handles communications and other information exchanges.

The Australian Advanced Air Traffic System is one of two systems in Australia, the other being the Australian Defence Air Traffic System (ADATS), which is used by the military. TAAATS makes use of the Thales Eurocat system and is used in two FIRs, Melbourne and Brisbane. It is also used in Terminal Control Units (TCUs) in Perth and Sydney.

It was developed and implemented in the late 1990s and commissioned in March 2000. The introduction of TAAATS increased controllers' productivity. The system is being replaced by OneSky which will be the first integrated civil-military air traffic management system for any country. OneSKY is expected to be operational by 2027.

== The TAAATS console ==
There are several facilities which use TAAATS in Australia. The two main area control centres in Brisbane and Melbourne both have roughly 42 operational consoles or "suites" and each suite has four computer screens:

- Air Situation Display (ASD): This main screen displays a map of the sector that shows the location of all aircraft in the controller's airspace, as reported by one of several data sources – radar data processing, flight data processing and automatic dependent surveillance.
- Aeronautical Reference Data Display & Distribution System (ARDDDS): A display providing access to a wide range of information including aircraft performance data, weather radar, airport/navigation aid/tracking point codes, airline ICAO designators, Standard Arrival Route (STAR) and Standard Instrument Departure (SID) charts and depiction of the airspace setup for Terminal Area (TMA) sectors.
- Voice Switching and Communications Select (VSCS) panel: A touch-sensitive screen allows controllers to choose the radio frequency they need to talk to pilots and ground staff, or the intercom for talking with other controllers.
- Auxiliary Display: The controller can call up a wide range of information such as weather forecasts, flight plans, strip windows, secondary maps and other material for the information of themselves and pilots.

== How TAAATS works ==
There are two flight information regions (FIRs) separated by an approximately diagonal line running from the northwest near the border with Indonesia to the southeast near Sydney. There are two air traffic service centres (ATSCs), one in Brisbane and another in Melbourne each responsible for providing air traffic control services in their FIRs. The Brisbane Centre is responsible for the FIR northeast of the line, and the Melbourne Centre for the FIR southwest. With the implementation of OneSKY, the Brisbane FIR will be merged in to the Melbourne FIR and the Melbourne Centre will thus be responsible for the entirety of Australia's enroute airspace. The physical Brisbane Centre will remain, however its facilities will only be used for air traffic control in the local area around Brisbane, as is the current case with the Terminal Control Units (TCUs) located in Perth and Sydney which were once responsible for their own FIRs under the previous structure.

The TCUs in Perth and Sydney are responsible for providing air traffic control services in their TMAs, covering a radius of 36 nautical miles (67 km) around Perth, and 45 nautical miles (83 km) around Sydney; and vertical coverage from the surface to 18,000 feet (5,500 m) around Perth and 28,000 feet (8,500 m) around Sydney.

Both Brisbane and Melbourne Centres contain 42 individual workstations divided into groups responsible for different sectors within each of their FIRs. A number of safeguards have been built into the system to reduce the risk of malfunction. For example, almost all of the electronic systems have been duplicated – standby equipment switches into immediate operation if the main equipment fails.

Both Brisbane and Melbourne Centres contain a simulator for training new air traffic controllers, but these simulators can be converted to operational control suites for the other control centre within 48 hours in the event of a devastating failure.

TAAATS incorporates ADS-B from more than 70 stations located at various sites across the country. The system introduced new features to air traffic control in Australia including conflict alerting and conformance monitoring.

== Previous structure ==
Australian airspace was previously divided into six FIRs, based roughly on State boundaries. So, for example, when an aircraft flew from Perth to Sydney, the pilots would communicate with air traffic control in the following order:

- The tower at Perth Airport gave instructions for runway taxiing and scheduling of take-off;
- A departure controller in Perth gave instructions for the climb out of Perth;
- An en route controller in Perth tracked the aircraft's progress as it headed east across the State;
- An en route controller in Adelaide tracked the aircraft as it traversed South Australia;
- An en route controller in Sydney tracked the aircraft once it entered New South Wales;
- An approach controller in Sydney gave the flight instructions for a safe approach into Sydney; and, finally,
- The tower at Sydney Airport issued landing and taxiing instructions.

Handwritten paper flight progress strips were used to track flights.

== Contingency ==
Each centre simulator contains 10 consoles that can be configured to take over from the sister centre in the unlikely event that an entire centre is taken offline by a catastrophe. For individual console failures, control functions can be quickly transferred to a spare suite by a few mouse clicks on the supervisor's console.

== See also ==
- Aviation in the digital age
