= Forensic DNA Consultants =

Forensic DNA Consultants (Pty) Ltd.
- Abbreviation: FDC
- Legal status: Private limited company
- Location: Pretoria, South Africa
- Region served: Southern Africa and International
- Members: Forensic Scientists, Biochemists, DNA Analysts
- Website: forensicdna.co.za

Forensic DNA Consultants (Pty) Ltd. (FDC) specialises in the provision of advisory and technical services related to the various aspects of forensic DNA profiling and analysis and their related laboratory, legal and administrative processes.

== Mission ==
The objective of the company is to assist the South African government, Public and Sub-Saharan Africa in general - to ensure transparent, informed and optimal delivery of all forensic DNA related services to the public in the investigation of crime, especially where these cases involve women and children, and to protect public interests with the future development of the National Forensic DNA Database of South Africa (NFDD) envisioned by the Criminal Law (Forensic Procedures) Amendment Bill 2013.

== Clients ==
FDC's clients include legal professionals, forensic scientists, forensic laboratories, companies providing services to the forensic DNA community and the general public.

Forensic DNA Consultants (Pty) Ltd is a community conscious company that frequently provides its services without financial compensation based on the merits of the situation.

== See also ==
- ISO/IEC 17025
- Good Laboratory Practice (GLP)
