= Sydney Airport Air Traffic Control Tower =

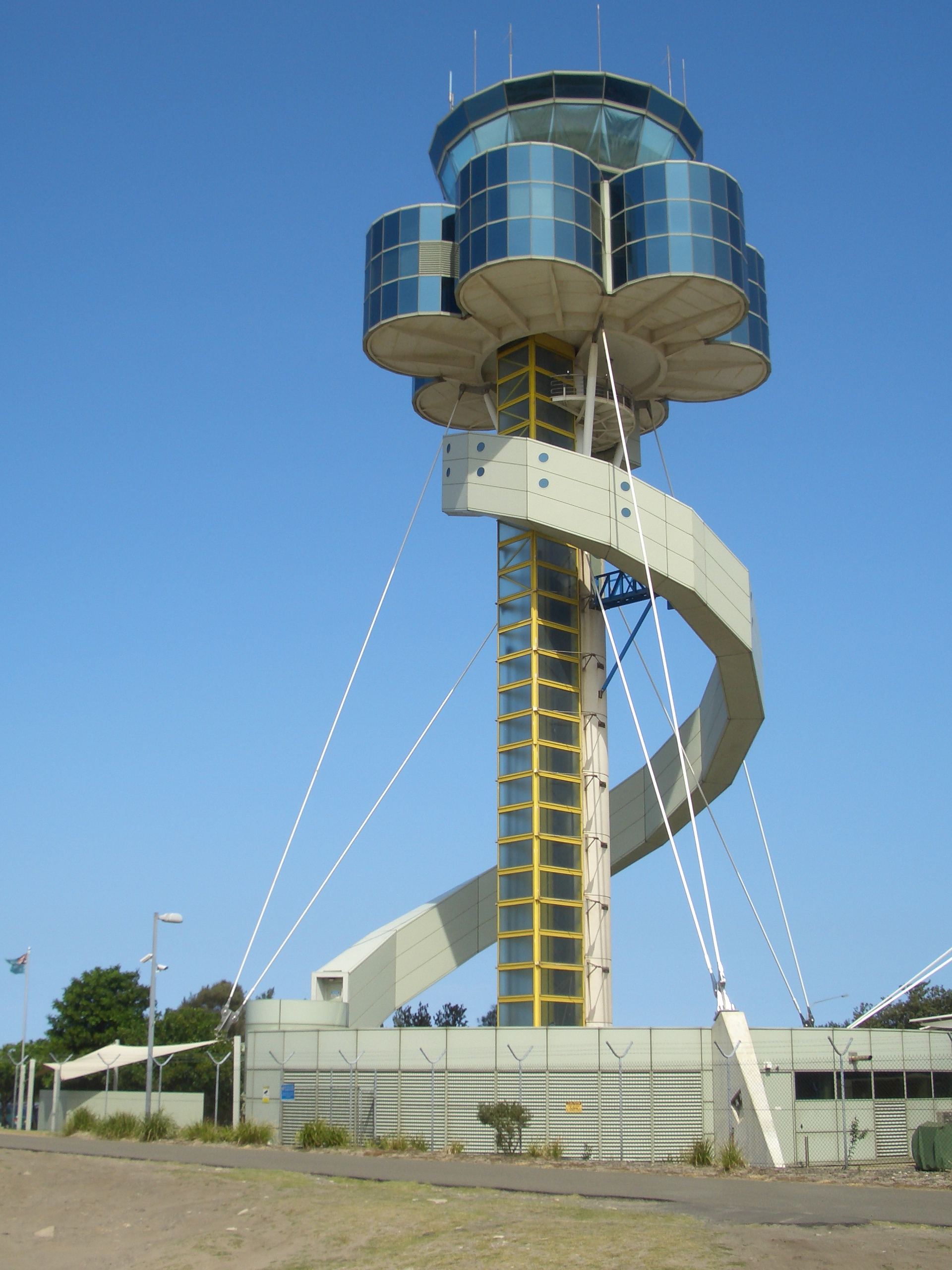

- Location within Sydney
- 33.9455°S 151.1809°E
- Location: Lawrence Hargreaves Drive, Sydney Airport, New South Wales, Australia

History
- Built: 6 January 1996

Commonwealth Heritage List
- Official name: Sydney Airport Air Traffic Control Tower
- Type: Listed place (Historic)
- Designated: 22 January 2016
- Reference no.: 106116

Sydney Airport Air Traffic Control Tower is a heritage-listed air traffic control tower at Lawrence Hargreaves Drive, Sydney Airport, New South Wales, Australia. It was added to the Australian Commonwealth Heritage List on 22 January 2016.

== History ==
Sydney Control Tower No.5 was conceived when government approval was granted for a new parallel northsouth runway at Sydney Airport, a development that meant Sydney Control Tower No. 4 would no longer have visual access to all areas of the runways and taxiways.

The eye-catching design of the new tower, conspicuously different from all preceding towers both in Australia and overseas, was developed by the architecture practice Ancher, Mortlock & Woolley (Sydney). Ken Woolley, an experienced and award-winning architect, was the design architect and recalls the commission as follows:

"The design evolved through discussions with the Civil Aviation Authority. The location of the building, next to General Holmes Drive, meant that it was going to be a landmark anyway - but was it going to be a good landmark? The notion [of developing a building with landmark qualities] was well supported [by the Civil Aviation Authority]".

The tower was designed and built to a tight time-frame. Construction began in August 1993, and the tower was commissioned on 6 January 1996. The budget was equivalent to recent control towers of conventional construction.

In 1995 the tower was awarded a high commendation in the Australian Steel Design Award for Buildings by the Australian Institute of Steel Construction (New South Wales).

== Description ==
Sydney Airport Air Traffic Control Tower is approximately 0.1ha on Lawrence Hargreaves Drive, Sydney Airport, comprising the Air Traffic Control Tower and its base building located within Land Parcel 8/DP1050923.

The control tower complex occupies a central position in the airport, to the north of the point at which General Holmes Drive goes under the main north–south runway. The tower is staffed 24hrs a day, every day of the year. The cabin floor is 38.5m above ground level; 42.85m to the cabin roof.

=== Exterior ===
Sydney 5 control tower comprises a cable-stayed pre-cast concrete shaft with an external passenger lift to the north. A spiral escape staircase sweeps around the concrete shaft, which is positioned just off-centre of the circular single-storey base building. The amenities/equipment level cantilevers from the top of the shaft, with the circular control cabin above.

The design concept is described by architect Ken Woolley:

"The geometry of the design is based on an equilateral triangle or tri-star plan with a slim pre-cast central column in which services run, supporting a steel strutted and cantilevered platform and braced by post-tensioned steel rods to three points on the base building. This ensures the most rigid, sway-free structure with the advantage of prefabrication for rapid construction."

The doughnut-shaped plan of the base building is broken to the north-east to accommodate an opening for a paved pathway, which leads to an entrance lobby at the south of a sheltered courtyard. The lobby was extended into the courtyard in c. 1998 to create a larger reception area.

The base building is sheathed in glass and aluminium panels. The roof, like all areas of roofing at the ATC complex including the roof of the cabin, is a waterproof membrane with pre-cast concrete panels above. A canopy projects from the south-west, shielding the primary point of access to the equipment rooms.

The off-white segmental concrete shaft is 2.5m in diameter and 20m high, with a flat face to the north to which the lift is attached by steel fly-braces. A metal column rising from the top of the concrete shaft carries the steel cloverleaf platform above. The lift shaft has a metal frame, painted yellow, with translucent glass panels. The lift terminates at the amenities/service level.

The platform for the amenities/services level was lifted from the ground in one piece. It is strutted by stainless steel fittings and tension adjusters, brought down to three piers at the edge of the base building. The platform has a cloverleaf plan of six bays formed by radiating steel ribs. The six bays, nicknamed "beer cans", are clad in reflective blue-tinted glass panels. The circular cabin has 18 panels of outward canted frameless glass.

The 12m-diameter cabin roof, carried on a central column rising through the cabin, is stabilised by thin stainless-steel rods outside the joints of the frameless 25mm-thick glass. The cabin roof accommodates surface movement radar, warning lights and a crown of aerials and lightning conductors.

The spiral staircase is a rectangular tube of 18 cranked facets in aluminium panels punctuated by small porthole windows. Two diagonally trussed steel walkways provide stability and access to the concrete shaft. The fire stair extends from the roof of the base building to a balcony – with an external platform – below the amenities/services bays. A return flight of stairs inside a single-storey concrete cylinder provides access from ground level to the bottom of the spiral staircase.

=== Interior ===
The base building accommodates the plant room, standby generator, uninterrupted power supply, equipment rooms, staff amenities, reception area, offices and meeting room. Finishes throughout are utilitarian and consistent with the mid-1990s period of the construction. Alterations to the base building since construction include the extension of the lobby (c. 1998), and modifications to the subdivision of the east wing to accommodate additional office space. The six bays that comprise the amenities and plant-room level are arranged in three pairs with differing functions. The two bays to the north accommodate air-conditioning plant; the two bays to the south-east are staff stand-down areas, including a galley; the two bays to the south-west accommodate equipment racks and facilities. Toilets are to the west of the central lift lobby and circulation space, with staircases extending to the cabin above and the escape stair below.

The floors are reinforced concrete, carpeted in the central lobby and stand-down areas; exposed in the air conditioning plant and equipment rooms. Ceilings in the lobby and stand-down areas are lined with perforated metal acoustic panels with recessed vents and lighting. Paint throughout is generally light-coloured.

The cabin, accessed via a carpeted curving staircase, is arranged around a central steel column, from which six cantilevers splay at the top to supports the cabin roof. This arrangement has the advantage of avoiding interference to sightlines by external columns, and also facilitates the use of peripheral consoles. Consoles abut the edge of the circular cabin (diameter 7.5m) to the east, north and west. The cabin managers' desk is to the south (rear). The consoles use touch-screen technology of the type used in modern aircraft, giving controllers access to situational radar, communication and meteorological data displays.

The cabin ceiling is lined with perforated metal acoustic panels. The cabin roof is accessed by a drop ladder to the south of the cabin ceiling. The concrete floor is carpeted. Storage space is limited. Cabinetry has been installed around the base of the central column and to the south-facing wall. The risers and treads of the spiral escape staircase are steel, painted white.

=== Condition ===
The ATC complex is largely intact as built, externally and internally, with the only significant modification being the extension of the curved entrance foyer to accommodate a larger reception area.

== Heritage listing ==
The Sydney 5 ATC complex was conceived in the early-1990s, when government approval was granted for a new parallel north–south runway at Sydney Airport, a development that meant the existing control tower (Sydney 4) would no longer have visual access to all areas of the runways and taxiways. The new tower was designed by architects Ancher Mortlock & Woolley Pty Ltd (design architect Ken Woolley) to specifications prepared by the Civil Aviation Authority (CAA). Documentation was complete in 1993, with construction occurring between 1993 and 1995. The complex was commissioned on 6 January 1996. The control tower is an elaboration of existing column-and-pod tower forms. It comprises a cable-stayed pre-cast concrete shaft with a steel and glass passenger lift attached. A cranked spiral stair sweeps around the concrete shaft. The amenities/equipment level adopts an unusual clover-like plan form (series of circular pods) and is cantilevered out from the top of the shaft, with the circular control cabin above this; both use distinctive facetted blue tinted glazing. The cabin roof is 42.85m above ground level.

A number of new ideas, both architectural and technical, were applied at Sydney 5. It is the only cable-stayed control tower in Australia. The cabin roof, carried on a single central column, was another "first" in Australia - the centralised column avoids interruption to sightlines by external columns. Sydney 5 was also the first Australian tower with a circular cabin fitted with a peripheral console, an established format internationally and the preferred future form of console in Australia (this was a requirement of the brief).

The external expression of the tower was an innovative and highly creative interpretation of the standard brief for control towers, adapting conventional control tower forms to explore the potential presented by its prominent site. An assured and resolved design by Ken Woolley, a prominent award-winning architect, Sydney 5 ATC tower stands as the first (and to date, the only) control tower in Australia consciously designed as a landmark, and displaying such distinctive and flamboyant architectural qualities. Its predecessors in the Australian context were either utilitarian structures based on standardised models (1950s- 1980s), or imposing but comparatively restrained forms consisting of slender concrete columns surmounted by amenities/services with cabins above (late-1960s to present). By way of comparison, the towers at Perth Airport (commissioned 1986) and Brisbane Airport (1988) are taller but far more restrained architecturally; both are facetted concrete columns flaring at c. 45m to accommodate amenities/services and control cabins.

Since the completion of Sydney 5, a number of tall and aesthetically striking control towers with "landmark" qualities have been constructed overseas. Examples include Malpensa Airport, Italy (2001), Vienna Airport, Austria (2006), Heathrow Airport, England (2007) and Suvarnabhumi Airport, Thailand (2006), which is the world's tallest free-standing control tower.

Sydney Airport Air Traffic Control Tower was listed on the Australian Commonwealth Heritage List on 22 January 2016 having satisfied the following criteria.

Criterion F: Technical achievement

Sydney Air Traffic Control tower embodies a number of new ideas, both architectural and technical. It is the only cable-stayed control tower in Australia, and one of very few internationally. The cabin roof, carried on a single central column, was another Australian "first" – the central column avoids interruption to sightlines by external columns. It was the first Australian tower with a circular cabin, and first to be fitted with a peripheral console, an established format internationally and the preferred future form in Australia. The requirement for unimpeded sightlines over the expanded airport dictated the use of peripheral consoles, which in turn informed the requirement for a central column to support the cabin roof. These design features, practically resolved at Sydney 5 Air Traffic Control tower, were requirements of the brief.

Sydney 5 was also the first tower in Australia to employ computer screen-based technology for its control consoles, derived from the "fly-by-wire" concept used in modern aircraft. The touch-screen consoles give controllers ready access to radar, communication and meteorological data displays. The use of touch-screen technology is consistent with on-going international developments in air traffic management. However, it is the formal appearance of Sydney 5 ATC tower that is considered to be of greatest interest.

Australian towers built subsequent to Sydney 5 (commissioned in 1996) have been variations on the column-and-pod model, while a number of towers built overseas since Sydney 5 have been designed as civic markers.
