= Bruno Grollo =

Australian businessman (born 1942)

Bruno Grollo AO
- Born: Bruno Gordano Grollo; 1942 (age 83–84); Melbourne, Victoria
- Occupations: Property developer; builder; entrepreneur
- Known for: Grocon
- Spouses: Dina Grollo (m. 1965; died 2001); Pierina Biondo (m. 2004)
- Children: 3
- Parents: Luigi Grollo (father); Emma née Girardi (mother)

Bruno Gordano Grollo AO (born 1942, Melbourne, Victoria) is an Australian businessman, property developer, and former director of Grocon and is noted for his controversy surrounding the Swanston Street Wall incident on 29 March 2013.

Bruno is the son of Luigi Grollo, who founded Grocon, one of Australia’s largest construction companies, in 1948 after immigrating to Australia from Italy. Bruno’s role in his company remains despite handing the title of chief executive and chairman to his son, Daniel Grollo, in 1999.

Following public disputes with Infrastructure NSW in 2020, Grocon announced that it and 86 of its subsidiaries have entered Voluntary Administration.

== Early life ==
Bruno Grollo was born in Melbourne in 1942 and is the son of accountant Emma Girardi (1913-1986) and builder Luigi Arturo Grollo (1909-1994). His grandfather, Giovanni Grollo, was a farmer.

Luigi Grollo emigrated to Australia at 18 years old, due to his adolescent life being rife with war, drought, storms and the death of his mother at 52 years old. He said of the experience growing up in Italy, ‘The following year, 1928, I saw that things were still going bad there. There was another storm that carried off everything. It left only the soles of our feet! Here were some new debts to pay off.’

Luigi Grollo and his family left their hometown of Arcade, Treviso, Italy after it became a World War I battleground and was no longer habitable. At 18 years old, with his older brother sponsoring him, he boarded the passenger ship named the Principe d’Udine and arrived in Melbourne on 24 July 1928 to start a new life in Australia. His cousin Carlo Zanatta was awaiting his arrival but did not recognise Luigi as they had not been together since he was a young boy. Luigi said of Carlo, ‘He was a good man to me. Zanatta took me to a boarding house in Russell Street, Melbourne. There we stayed all one day and one night. The next morning we left for Healesville to go to work.’

In 1938, Luigi settled in Carlton and began concreting work, whilst building his construction business, formerly known as L Grollo & Sons, on the weekends, while his wife, Emma, helped with bookkeeping and accounts. Luigi’s one-man company began with residential paths, gutters, fireplace foundations and swimming pools before rapidly expanding in the 1950s to become the Grollo Group, transitioning to constructing multiple high-rises in Melbourne.

Bruno had a substantial role in his father’s company whilst growing up; he and his brother would help out, gaining trade experience whilst still at school. He had minimal formal education growing up, recalling his attendance as a ‘series of Catholic schools’ before beginning his career as a labourer. In 1958, at 15 years old, Bruno left school and began his career in construction when he joined his father’s company, of, at the time almost 130 employees. His brother, Rino Grollo, soon after joined the company in 1965. In 1968, after suffering a heart-attack, the patriarch and Director of Grocon, Luigi Grollo, retired and left sons, Bruno and Rino as co-Directors of his company Grocon. Following the stressful period after their mother’s death in 2001, Bruno and Rino divided the company and its assets into two. Bruno headed Grocon Constructions and multiple building assets, and in 200,3 made his two sons, Adam and Daniel, joint managing directors.

== Controversy ==
Bruno Grollo has been involved in several media controversies concerning himself and his company, Grocon.

=== On Trial ===
In 1997, Bruno Grollo and co-accuseds John William Flanagan and Robert Charles Howard were acquitted of conspiracy charges. They were accused of bribing a Federal Police officer, Superintendent Lloyd Farrell, and of conspiring to pervert the course of justice. This conspiracy arose from fears surrounding the taxation office in which the court alleged that Grollo had failed to declare $59 million in the process of building the Rialto Towers. Recorded as one of the longest trials in Victorian history, running for 13 months, this investigation into the taxation affairs of the Grollo Group resulted in a not-guilty verdict on all charges for all three men, Grollo, Flanagan and Howard, and ended on 26 June 1997.

=== Swanston Street collapse ===
On 28 March 2013, during wind gusts of up to 102 kilometres per hour (63 mph) a Grocon building site construction wall collapsed on Swanston Street, Melbourne killing three pedestrians walking by. This collapse resulted in the death of Bridget Jones, Alexander Jones and Marie-Faith Fiawoo. This fatal incident in which promotional hoarding incorrectly fastened to a Grocon brick wall, resulted in a court case in which Grocon Victoria Street Pty Ltd pleaded guilty to a charge of failing to warrant a safe workplace. Grollo stated about the incident, ‘I personally, along with all of the directors and employees of Grocon, reiterate our deep regret at the tragic and untimely loss’. The court case against WorkSafe Victoria, concluding in 2014, resulted in a guilty verdict and a $250,000 fine for Grollo’s company, Grocon.

== Grocon Constructions ==
As the new co-director of Grocon, Bruno and his company were involved in many of the projects that created Melbourne’s skyline. His projects included the Rialto Towers, the Hyatt Hotel and the Eureka Tower in 2006, which was one of the world’s highest residential towers at the time. Continuing his expansion into Sydney with the Governor Phillip Tower, the Macquarie Towers and 1 Bligh Street, the two brothers led Australia’s construction industry to new heights.

=== Grollo Tower ===
The Grollo Tower proposal was a $1.7 billion, 500m skyscraper for the Melbourne Docklands, proposed by Bruno as a gift to Melburnians in 1995, but also partially funded by the Victorian public. Bruno stated of the tower, 'It would be a golden building for a golden city for the golden times to come ... it has to put the city on the world map’ . His ambitious ideals underlined many aspects of the company, Grollo stated he wanted, ‘To do something for Melbourne that did what the pyramids did for Egypt, or the Colosseum did for Rome, or the Opera House and Harbour Bridge did for Sydney'. The Grollo Tower, although never coming to fruition, would have been the tallest in the world at that time. The proposal was reviewed again in 2003 for construction to begin in Dubai, commissioned by The Grollo Corporation and Emaar Properties, the largest development company in the Arab Emirates. The $3 billion deal was proposed as an exact replica of the original Grollo Tower, however ultimately the project was cancelled and Bruno’s ambitious skyscraper was never built.

=== Cyclone Tracy restoration ===
On Christmas Day in 1974, Cyclone Tracy destroyed more than 70 percent of Darwin’s buildings, including 80 percent of its houses; this led to the Northern Territory Government signing a contract with the Grollo Group to help with restorations. Both Rino and Bruno were involved in the restoration of the cyclone-torn city, building 400 cyclone-proof houses with various designs for the government. This contract substantially grew their business and by the 1980s, Grocon had a total workforce of over 1,000 employees.

=== Voluntary administration ===
In 2020, following public disputes with Infrastructure NSW, Grocon announced that it and 86 of its subsidiaries had been placed in voluntary administration. The Grocon predicament began in November 2020 when Daniel Grollo experienced troubles with the latest Grocon projects, in Barangaroo, Sydney and inner-city Melbourne.

In January 2018, Grocon was awarded construction rights for a project in Central Barangaroo, Sydney, as a deal with Aqualand and Scentre Group. In 2019, during a court battle with Dexus over a $28 million lease claim, they put two subsidiaries into voluntary administration. In 2020, during the COVID-19 pandemic, Grocon's only Melbourne-based project, consisting of a $111 million office development, stopped construction, with subcontractors, employees, and creditors said to be owed more than $100 million.

Grocon is suing the Government of New South Wales, claiming they lost $270 million during the sale of the Barangaroo Central project to Aqualand for $73 million in 2020, and it is due to be seen in the Supreme Court of New South Wales in 2022.

== Personal life ==
Bruno Grollo married Dina Bettiol in 1965 and they had three children together, Danie, Leanna and Adam. They were married for 26 years before Dina suffered a stroke which left her severely paralysed until her death, aged 58, in December 2001; Bruno keeps a room in her honour at his house.

On 14 February 2004, Grollo was remarried to Pierina Biondo at St Patrick's Cathedral, Melbourne.

In 2014, he revealed in an interview with Melbourne journalist, Ruth Ostrow, of his ongoing struggles with leukaemia, melanoma and prostate cancer. Grollo stated, ‘My biggest goal now is staying alive. I’m trying to live long enough to see the success of gene, nano and stem-cell therapies, which will keep us alive.’ He now employs a professional team within his Melbourne home in Thornbury, ‘Casa Del Matto’ which translates to House of the Madman in English to research products on the market and new science on anti-ageing and longevity. Grollo stated, ‘This is cutting-edge biology and those young and healthy enough to be around will be able to live indefinitely.’ Grollo takes up to 100 tablets per day, exercises regularly, and every day will hang upside down on a machine with a backwards tilt to increase longevity.

Since retiring from the construction industry, stating, ‘buildings are hard work, they’re stressful, they are draining. They’re hard to put up. I’d had enough. I got out.' Bruno has found a passion for meditation and Maharishi yoga and has since invested $3 million into a transcendental meditation college in Watsonia. Stating that, ‘The Maharishi said consciousness is everything. It’s the closest thing to what God might be, your consciousness, mine, the dog, the cat, the flowers, the trees... transcendental meditation was the closest thing to euphoria and youth I’ve ever discovered.'

In 1991, Grollo was appointed an Officer of the Order of Australia for service to building and construction and to the community.

=== Net worth ===
In 2006, Grollo was listed in Forbes top 40 richest people in Australia and New Zealand. Bruno Grollo and family were listed on the Financial Review Rich List 2018 with an assessed net worth of A$702 million. Bruno Grollo and family did not appear on the 2019 Rich List, although Rino Grollo and his family were independently assessed with a net worth of A$583 million.

Bruno, Rino, and/or their father, Luigi (whilst living), are one of thirteen living Australians who have appeared on every Financial Review Rich List, since it was first published in 1984.

Year	Financial Review Rich List		Forbes Australia's 50 richest	
Year	Rank	Net worth A$ bn	Rank	Net worth US$ bn
2006			40	
2014				
2015			n/a	not listed
2016			n/a	not listed
2017		0.720 ▼	n/a	not listed
2018	113 ▼	0.702 ▼		
2019	n/a	not listed	n/a	not listed

Legend
Icon	Description
Steady	Has not changed from the previous year
▲	Has increased from the previous year
▼	Has decreased from the previous year

== Philanthropy ==
Bruno and his brother, Rino, along with their wives, Dina Bettiol and Diana Ruzzene, became well known in the Melbourne community for being generous philanthropists. They would all often donate to community groups, charities, educational organisations and sporting institutions.

After their mother’s death in December 2001, they established The Emma Grollo Memorial Scholarship in her memory, funded by Bruno, Rino and the Grollo Group. The scholarship seeks to provide financial support to students studying Italian language or literature at the University of Melbourne.

Bruno remembers his mother with these words, ‘My mother had a unique ability to keep us united. She managed to keep us united right up until the very end ... and sometimes this was not easy ... Of all her merits, this for me was the greatest.’
