= Grocon =

Australian privately owned development, construction and funds management company

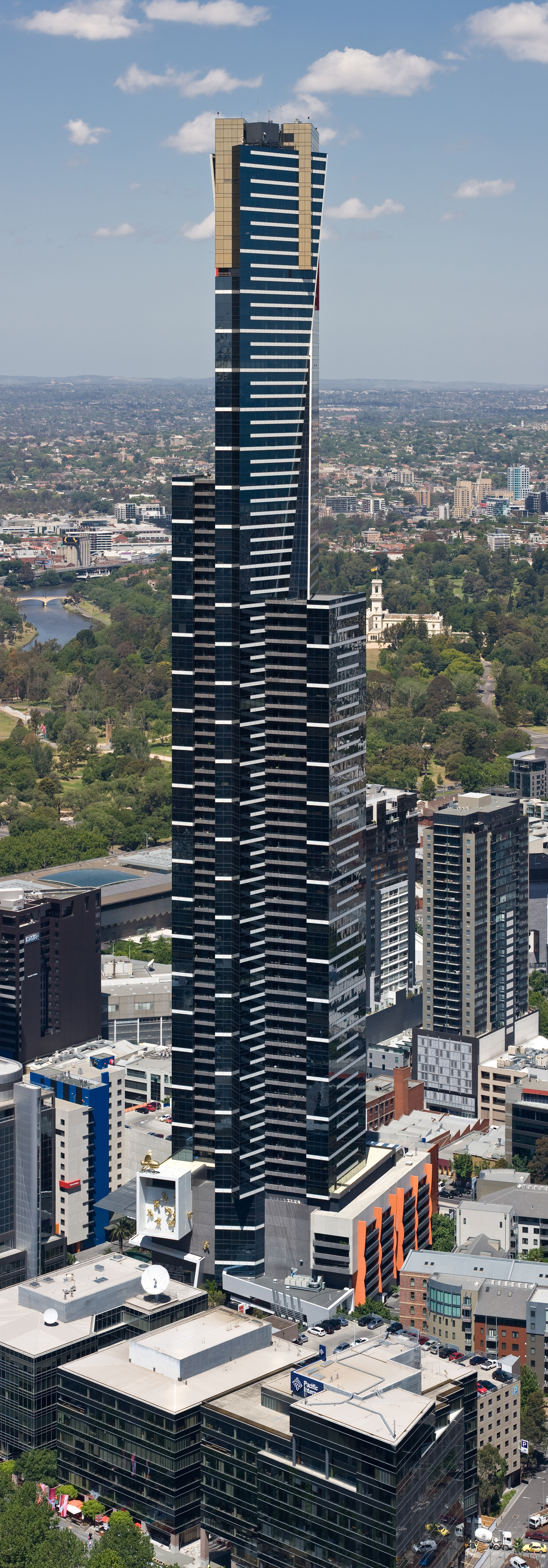
- Eureka Tower, in Southbank, Melbourne; at the time of its 2006 completion, the world's tallest residential tower at 297.5 metres (976 ft)
- Type: Private
- Industry: Construction
- Founded: 1948; 78 years ago
- Founder: Luigi Grollo
- Headquarters: Melbourne, Australia
- Area served: Australia; India; Middle East
- Key people: Daniel Grollo (Executive Chairman)
- Services: Property development, construction and funds management
- Revenue: A$317 million (FY2017)
- Owner: Bruno Grollo and family
- Website: www.grocon.com

Grocon is an Australian property developer, contractor and funds management company that is privately owned by the Grollo family. Founded in Melbourne in 1948, it expanded to operate in India and the Middle East. In November of 2020, parts of the company were placed into voluntary administration.

== History ==
Grocon grew from a small family concreting business established in Victoria, by Luigi Grollo after he emigrated from Treviso, Italy in 1928. A one-man operation, Luigi Grollo set up his own business in 1948 and completed small concreting projects, such as paving, shopping centre car parks, sewerage infrastructure and swimming pools. His sons Rino and Bruno joined the business at the age of 15. The business expanded rapidly in the 1950s by continuing with concreting of municipal swimming pools and petrol stations in Melbourne. In the years following, the Grollo Group would transition from the building of local community assets throughout the 1960s to constructing landmark developments.

In the 1970s, Grocon moved into concrete construction, such as shopping centres and high-rise buildings and started developing the projects themselves. It was also during the 1970s that Luigi Grollo handed the company over to his two sons and the business continued to rapidly expand. In 1975, Grocon moved to Darwin for 18 months after winning a large contract for rebuilding after Cyclone Tracy. This contract involved the construction of 400 houses for the government. Following this, the Grollo Group went on to develop buildings and operate businesses in a wide cross-section of industries, including commercial, residential, industrial, education, retail, sporting and tourism.

In the 1980s, many developments owned by the Grollo family were sold. This included the selling of such assets as The Hyatt, Shell Corner, 200 Queen Street and a suite of shopping centres. At this stage, the Grollo family only retained one major development – the Rialto Towers.

In 2000, the construction business was split between a construction-centric business owned by Bruno and Daniel Grollo and a property development operation owned by Rino Grollo. As part of this shift, Rino Grollo secured Equiset and the Grollo Group (including its family properties). In 1999, Bruno's youngest son, Daniel, assumed control of Grocon as chief executive officer. Daniel Grollo was appointed chairman of the Green Building Council of Australia and the Prime Minister's Business Advisory Council.

In March 2012 the construction business was split again into a construction business, owned by Daniel Grollo, which is the current Grocon, and a property development business owned by his older siblings, Adam and Leeanna.

In December 2013, Grocon launched a five-year, A$10 billion joint venture, called UBS Grocon Real Estate, with Swiss investment bank, UBS. The joint venture created UBS Grocon Real Estate, a full-service real estate and asset management platform that had first right of refusal for Grocon's A$2 billion development pipeline. The venture was chaired by John A. Fraser, chairman and CEO Global Asset Management at UBS and Daniel Grollo acted as a non-executive director.

In 2014, Grocon was named as the preferred developer for the 2018 Commonwealth Games Athletes Village on the Queensland Gold Coast. On 24 February 2014, deputy chief executive officer Carolyn Viney succeeded Daniel Grollo as chief executive officer of Grocon. Daniel Grollo assumed the role of executive chairman whilst retaining full oversight and ownership of the business. In November 2020, parts of Grocon were placed in administration. Cost blowouts for the athletes village for the Games topped $1 billion led to Grocon from having permission refused from the state government to start a project in Queensland.

=== Awards and accolades ===
As a company, Grocon was the recipient of numerous awards. In 2010, Grocon was named the Forest Stewardship Council Developer of the Year, and was also the National Master Builders Association Builder of the Year in 2011. Grocon received two The National Association of Women in Construction awards in 2013 for both outstanding and young achievement. In 2011, the company was the recipient of the ANZ–BRW Excellence in Community Practices prize. Grocon won the 2008 Safe Work Australia Best workplace health and safety management system award and received the WorkSafe Victoria OHS Management System of the Year prize.

=== Industrial disputes ===
Grocon was involved in conflict with the Construction, Forestry, Mining and Energy Union (CFMEU) from 2002 over the CFMEU's rights at Grocon developments including occupational health and safety management, union access, and the wearing of union badges. This conflict culminated in the CFMEU's picketing of at least one entrance to the Emporium development which resulted in an impassable physical barrier, preventing access to the site through that entrance for Grocon workers. Grocon subsequently launched an A$10.5 million compensation claim in the Supreme Court of Victoria for the blockade. It also sought contempt orders against the union for allegedly breaching two Supreme Court injunctions that ordered an end to the blockade. Justice Cavanough held that free access to the site for Grocon workers was prevented by the CFMEU as access could only be obtained through 'elaborate' police assistance. The Fair Work Building and Construction, the relevant regulatory body, subsequently also launched legal proceedings against the CFMEU. In June 2015, judgment was made against the CFMEU and they were ordered to pay Grocon A$3.5 million in damages.

=== Swanston Street wall incident ===
On 28 March 2013, during wind gusts of up to 102 kilometres per hour (63 mph), a brick wall on the boundary of a Grocon development on Swanston Street collapsed killing three people. The wall's safety, the role of the billboards Grocon had attached to the structure, and the self-supporting nature of the structure designed by the previous owner were initially identified as possible causes. The billboard extended one metre (three feet) above the wall and was suggested to have acted as a sail. There was early speculation as to the role of the advertising hoarding and whether a permit had been granted or whether a permit was needed. There were also questions surrounding the role of tree roots in destabilising the wall. An unidentified spokesperson for the Victorian Government asked unions not to block productivity over the case. WorkSafe Victoria filed criminal charges against Grocon and Aussie Signs who were employed by Grocon to construct the billboard. Police acting in the case have stated that Grocon representatives refused to give evidence, and the company did not release an engineering report the court has asked for access to, saying it "was not relevant".

In November 2014 Grocon was fined $250,000 in the Magistrates Court after it pleaded guilty to a single workplace safety charge "... relating to the risk posed by the wall, rather than causing it to fall down."

=== Alleged sabotage ===
Grocon experienced two fires on separate Victorian construction sites, and various other acts of suspected sabotage in June 2014.

== List of developments ==
As of December 2013, Grocon built four of Australia's five tallest buildings in Melbourne, Sydney, and South-east Queensland. Grocon subsequently increased its operations abroad in India and the United Arab Emirates.

Project	Image	City, State	Country	Date completed (or expected date)	Height		Description	Source
Project	Image	City, State	Country	Date completed (or expected date)	m	ft	Description	Source
Grand Hyatt Melbourne		Melbourne, Victoria	Australia	c. 1986			Located at 123 Collins Street, this 34-level hotel offers 550 guest rooms and suites	
101 Collins Street		Melbourne, Victoria	Australia	1991	260	850	Commercial office skyscraper that was the tallest building in Melbourne for five months only	
120 Collins Street		Melbourne, Victoria	Australia	1991	265	869	Art Deco commercial office skyscraper with a granite façade that was the tallest building in Melbourne until 2006; and was the tallest buildings in Australia until 2005	
ANZ Global Headquarters		Melbourne, Victoria	Australia	1993	172	564	Modifications to the former global headquarters located at 380 Collins Street, that comprised a 37-storey post-modern commercial office skyscraper on the site of Verdon Chambers	
Crown Towers		Melbourne, Victoria	Australia	1997	153	502	Located at 8 Whiteman Street on Melbourne's Southbank and part of the Crown Casino, the hotel was the recipient of the Master Builders Association Award in 1998 and upon its 1997 completion, the largest casino in the Southern Hemisphere	
Pixel Building		Melbourne, Victoria	Australia				Using carbon neutral Pixelcrete concrete, Australia's first carbon neutral office building. Pixel was awarded the Best Sustainable Building Award from the Master Builders Association and received the Premier's Sustainability Award for the Built Environment	
Queen Victoria Village		Melbourne, Victoria	Australia				A$600 million urban village precinct surrounding Melbourne Central railway station which received the Australian Property Institute Property Development Award	
Shell House		Melbourne, Victoria	Australia				Shell's Australian headquarters and awarded a Property Council of Australia certification	
Rialto Towers		Melbourne, Victoria	Australia		270	890	Twin tower complex and the second tallest concrete building in the Southern Hemisphere	
SECV Project		Melbourne, Victoria	Australia					
Telstra Centre		Melbourne, Victoria	Australia					
WTC Wharf		Melbourne, Victoria	Australia					
1 Bligh Street		Sydney, New South Wales	Australia				Six Star-rated office and winner of the Best Tall Building Award in Asia & Australasia for 2012 in the Council on Tall Buildings and Urban Habitat's Skyscraper Awards	
Common Ground		Sydney, New South Wales	Australia				Equity housing development in both Sydney and Brisbane and Urban Design Institute of Australia Award for Affordable Development winner	
Governor Phillip Tower		Sydney, New South Wales	Australia		227	745	Commercial office complex in Sydney's prestigious north-eastern CBD precinct and Property Council of Australia National Award winner	
Horizon Apartments		Sydney, New South Wales	Australia		144	472	Residential apartment complex in Darlinghurst	
General Post Office		Sydney, New South Wales	Australia				No 1 Martin Place – a commercial office development of an historic precinct surrounding the General Post Office in Sydney	
The Peak Apartments		Sydney, New South Wales	Australia		166	545	Residential apartment complex in Haymarket	
World Tower		Sydney, New South Wales	Australia		230	750	Skyscraper in Sydney, briefly Australia's tallest residential building and recipient of the 2004 Bronze Emporis Skyscraper Award	
480 Queen Street		Brisbane, Queensland	Australia				Six Star-rated office complex, anchored by BHP and Herbert Smith Freehills in the Brisbane CBD	
The Oracle		Gold Coast, Queensland	Australia				A$850 million development at Broadbeach	
Soul		Gold Coast, Queensland	Australia				An Australian Institute of Building National Professional Excellence Building and Cbus High Rise Award recipient, the 243-metre (797 ft) residential tower completed on the Gold Coast's waterfront in 2012	
Parklands, the 2018 Commonwealth Games Athletes Village		Gold Coast, Queensland	Australia				An A$550 million development featuring 1,252 dwellings with a mix of apartments and townhouses, a 5,840-square-metre (62,900 sq ft) retail precinct, green and landscaped spaces built around a 'Village Heart'. Strategically located on prime real estate within the Gold Coast Health and Knowledge Precinct, 3 kilometres (2 mi) from Southport CBD and 5 kilometres (3 mi) from Surfers Paradise.	
Grollo houses		Darwin, Northern Territory	Australia				Ground-level and split-level homes recognisable by the small protrusion on the roof which held the water heater. These houses were built in the aftermath of Cyclone Tracy as an effective means of providing housing for Darwin's population. The houses were designed by Leo Hammond, a Melbourne architect.	
Melbourne Cricket Ground Northern Stand Redevelopment		Melbourne, Victoria	Australia	2006			Redevelopment for the 2006 Commonwealth Games	
Eureka Tower		Melbourne, Victoria	Australia	2006	298	978	At the time of its construction, the world's tallest residential tower and awarded the Urban Design Award in the Victorian Architecture Awards	
Rose Tower		Dubai	United Arab Emirates	2007			The world's tallest hotel until 2012	
Almas Tower		Dubai	United Arab Emirates	2009	360	1,180	A skyscraper – the tallest building in Dubai at the time of completion	
AXA Centre		Melbourne, Victoria	Australia	2009			Located at 750 Collins Street, the redeveloped A$240 million ten-storey building in Melbourne's Docklands was the winner of the 2009 Property Council of Australia Victorian Award for Office Developments	
Media House		Melbourne, Victoria	Australia	2009	40	131	Located at 655 Collins Street, the commercial office building served as the publication centre for The Age, and adjoined Southern Cross railway station. The building was the 2012 Colliers Award recipient for Best Office Development	
Burj Khalifa		Dubai	United Arab Emirates	2009	830	2,720	An assisting contractor for the world's tallest residential tower, including an office, hotel and observation tower	
Elizabeth Street Common Ground		Melbourne, Victoria	Australia	2010			Located at 660 Elizabeth Street. this eleven-storey, 131-room community housing initiative was built at cost with the support of the Victorian and the Australian governments	
Melbourne Rectangular Stadium (AAMI Park)		Melbourne, Victoria	Australia	2010			30,500 capacity soccer, rugby league and rugby union in the Melbourne Sports and Entertainment Precinct	
KPMG House		Melbourne, Victoria	Australia	pre-2011			Formerly the T&G Building, located at 161 Collins Street, Grocon redeveloped the building as commercial offices for KPMG, and has subsequently been occupied by other tenants.	
Etihad Towers		Abu Dhabi	United Arab Emirates	2011			A complex of five towers that comprise offices, apartments and a hotel	
Elite Residence		Dubai	United Arab Emirates	2012			A DH1 billion residential skyscraper project in the Dubai Marina	
Princess Tower		Dubai	United Arab Emirates	2012	404	1,325	A residential-only skyscraper, that was the world's tallest residential building from 2012 to 2015	
ANZ Bank Centre		Sydney, New South Wales	Australia	2012	195	640	Commercial office tower and Sydney headquarters for ANZ, Herbert Smith Freehills and Boston Consulting Group; winner of the Master Builders Association Safety Award, located at 161 Castlereagh Street, Sydney	
Australian Taxation Office		Brisbane, Queensland	Australia	2013			Brisbane offices for the Australian Taxation Office at 55 Elizabeth Street	
Legion House		Sydney, New South Wales	Australia	2013			Six Star zero-carbon refurbishment at 161 Castlereagh Street	
Australian Taxation Office		Melbourne, Victoria	Australia	2014			Melbourne offices for the Australian Taxation Office in Box Hill	
Emporium Melbourne		Melbourne, Victoria	Australia	2014			A retail space neighbouring Melbourne Central railway station built on the site of the old Myer Emporium on Lonsdale Street between Swanston and Elizabeth streets	
150 Collins Street		Melbourne, Victoria	Australia	2014			12-storey office building comprising Westpac's corporate headquarters in Melbourne	
Central Market Project		Abu Dhabi	United Arab Emirates	2014			Designed by Foster + Partners initially as a three tower complex, the Great Recession resulted in the cancelation of the hotel tower	
Victorian Comprehensive Cancer Centre (VCCC)		Melbourne, Victoria	Australia	2015			An A$1.2 billion public-private partnership with the Victorian Government for a cancer treatment precinct in Parkville	
Greenwich, Fairfield		Melbourne, Victoria	Australia	2019			An A$40 million medium-density residential development in Fairfield that comprises 77 apartments through a mix of one, two and three bedroom apartments inclusive of social housing, with adjacent retail tenancies	
Twenty95		Sydney, New South Wales	Australia	2019			Mixed-use redevelopment in Manly comprising residential and retail components on the site of a Telstra Exchange, featuring 490 square metres (5,300 sq ft) of commercial / retail net lettable area, 26 apartments, a multi-level basement car stacker and a refurbished Telstra Exchange	
World One		Mumbai	India	2020	442	1,450	A residential complex that, at the time of its completion, was the tallest residential complex on the subcontinent	
Pentominium		Dubai	United Arab Emirates	On hold since 2011	516	1,693	An all-residential development; one of the tallest of its kind in the world	
Northumberland		Melbourne, Victoria	Australia	Contract terminated December 2020			Located in Collingwood and designed by John Wardle Architects, The Northumberland development was to include a twelve-level office building and a companion five-level office building with a ground floor café. Fund managers withdrew their support of Grocon when the company entered voluntary administration.	
The Ribbon		Sydney, New South Wales	Australia	Contract terminated December 2020			The A$700 million 24-storey redevelopment in the heart of Darling Harbour was planned to provide a new hotel, retail, apartments and commercial hub. Following the demolition of the existing IMAX building, the new building is planned to comprise a reinforced concrete structural steel structure that will cantilever over the public domain, Wheat Road and Harbour Street. The redeveloped building was to comprise approximately 1,799 square metres (19,360 sq ft) of retail, 3,217 square metres (34,630 sq ft) of entertainment, 450 square metres (4,800 sq ft) of commercial office space, 18,260 square metres (196,500 sq ft) of serviced apartments, and 30,820 square metres (331,700 sq ft) for a W Hotel.	
