= WorkCover =

WorkCover can refer to workers' compensation agencies in multiple Australian states and territories:

- NT WorkSafe, is a Work Health and Safety (WHS) regulatory body divided into three distinct cells; WHS Inspectors, Permissioning and Advisory Service and finally, Workers' Compensation and Rehabilitation. NT WorkSafe is a sub department of the Department of Business (DoB), Northern Territory Government (NTG), Australia.
- ORS WorkCover, a unit of the Office of Regulatory Services, Department of Justice and Community Safety of the Australian Capital Territory
- WorkCover Authority of New South Wales, a workers' compensation agency in New South Wales, Australia
  - WorkCover Hub, an independent service in New South Wales that helps injured workers navigate the WorkCover system and access providers
- WorkCoverSA, a workers' compensation agency in South Australia
- WorkCover Tasmania, a workers' compensation agency in Tasmania, Australia
- WorkCover WA, a government agency responsible for the workers' compensation and injury management system in Western Australia
- Victorian Workcover Authority, also known as WorkSafe Victoria, a workers' compensation agency in Victoria, Australia
