= Queen Street, Melbourne =

Street in Melbourne, Victoria

Queen Street Victoria
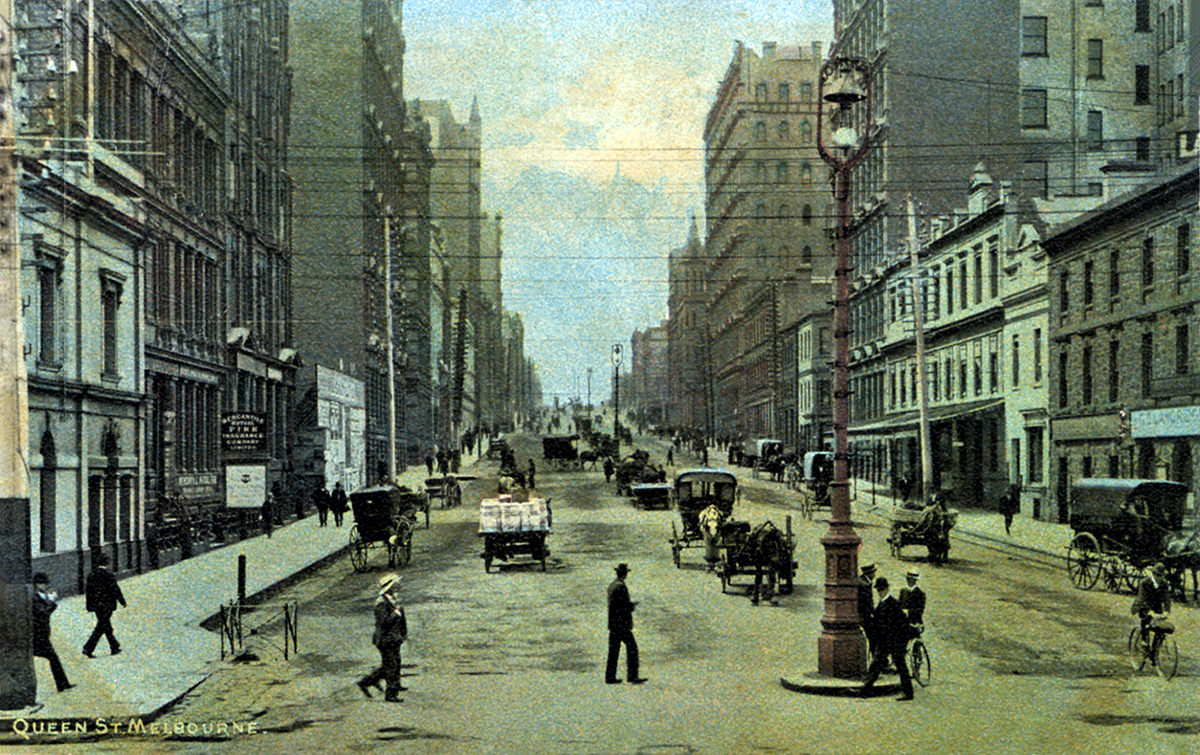
- Queen Street circa 1890
- Coordinates: 37.81264609999999°S 144.9596861°E

General information
- Type: Street
- Opened: 1837

Major junctions
- North end: Lily Street; North Melbourne, Melbourne
- Victoria Street; Franklin Street; A'Beckett Street; La Trobe Street; Lonsdale Street; Bourke Street; Collins Street
- South end: Flinders Street; Melbourne CBD

Location(s)
- Suburb(s): North Melbourne, Melbourne CBD

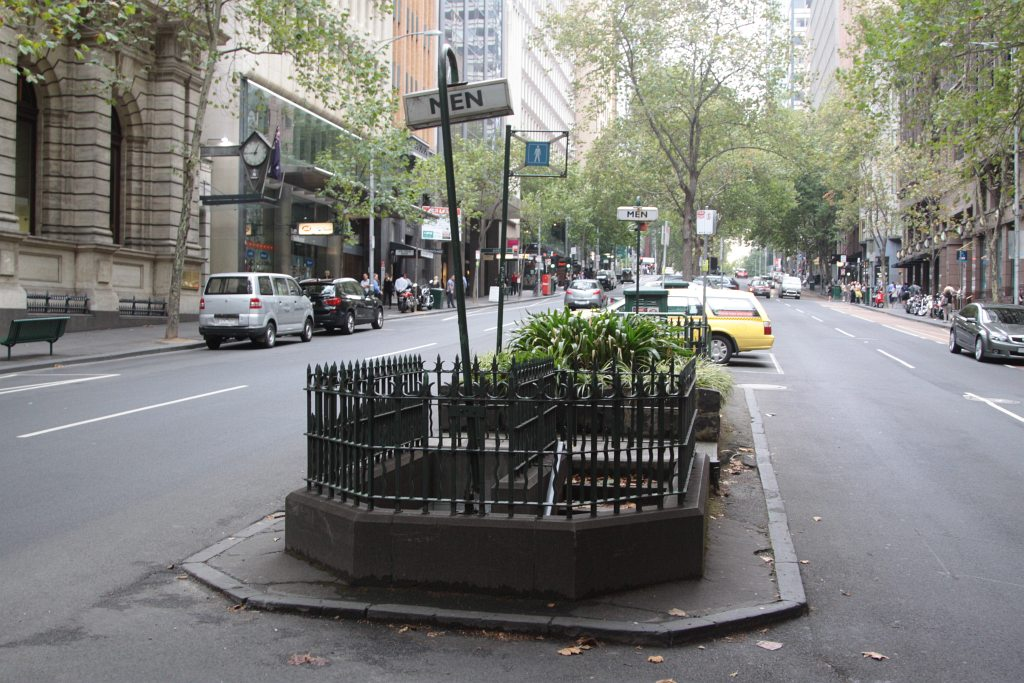
A classic underground toilet on Queen Street

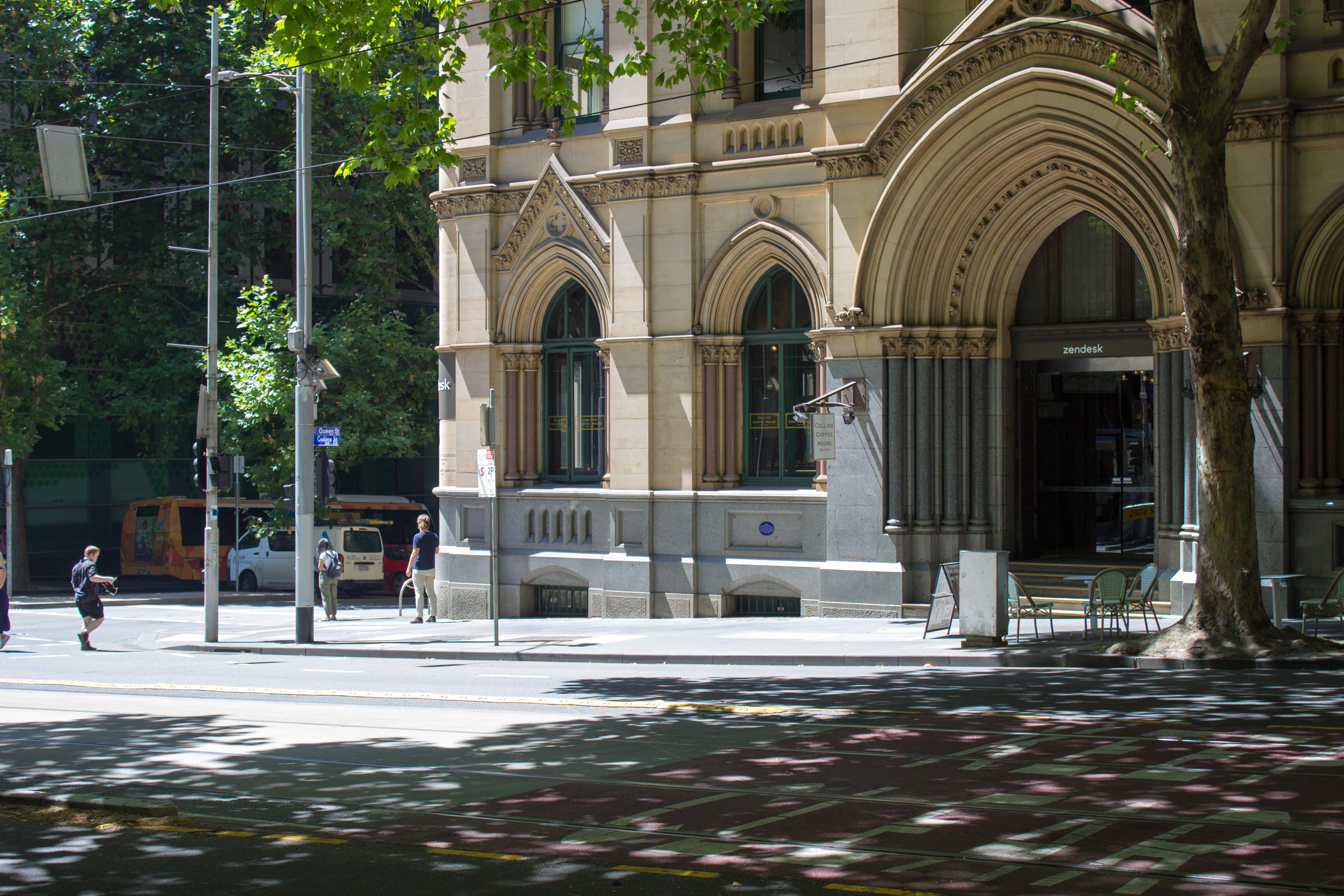
South-west corner of the intersection of Collins and Queen Street, Melbourne

Queen Street is a street in the Melbourne central business district, Victoria, Australia. The street forms part of the original Hoddle Grid and was laid out in 1837. It runs roughly north-south and is primarily a commercial and financial thoroughfare of the central business district.

Queen Street is named for Adelaide of Saxe-Meiningen.

== Geography ==
The northern end of Queen Street intersects with Victoria Street, while its southern end intersects with Flinders Street. Queen Street bisects the Queen Victoria Market into the dry section and wet section.

== Notable buildings ==
As part of the traditional financial district of Melbourne, Queen Street is home to many buildings listed on Victorian Heritage Register and/or classified by the National Trust of Australia. These include:

- Queen Victoria Market (1878) & Old Melbourne Cemetery (1837)
- John Smith's House (1852)
- Former Bank of New South Wales (1860)
- 203 Queen Street (1869)
- Former Titles Office (1875)
- Felton Building (1886)
- Former ES&A (English, Scottish & Australian Bank) Building (1887)
- Lombard Building (1889)
- Former Safe Deposit Building (1891)
- Former Records Office (1904)
- Aldersgate House (1924)
- Alkira House (1937)
- ACA (Australian Catholic Assurance) Building (1937)
- National Trustees Executors & Agency Co (1939)
- Several underground public conveniences

There are also many notable high-rise office buildings along Queen Street, including:

- 200 Queen Street (1982)
- ANZ Bank Tower (1993)
- Republic Tower (299 Queen Street)
- Bank of China (270 Queen Street)
- Former Fletcher Jones Building (1873)

=== Architecture ===
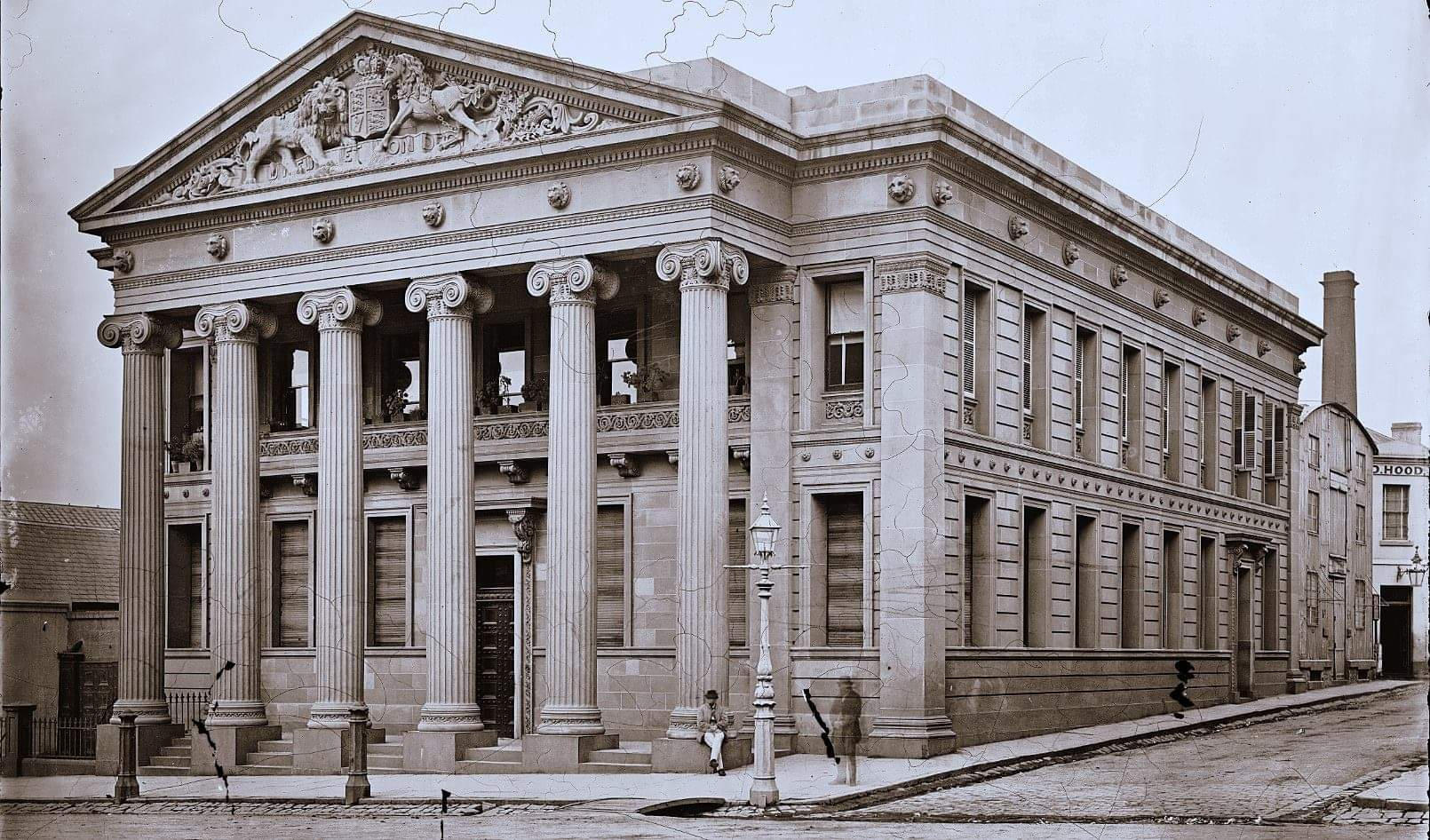
The Oriental Bank, pictured here in the 1870s, was located on the south-west corner of Queen Street and Flinders Lane, circa 1870s. The bank went out of business in around 1884 and was demolished shortly afterwards.

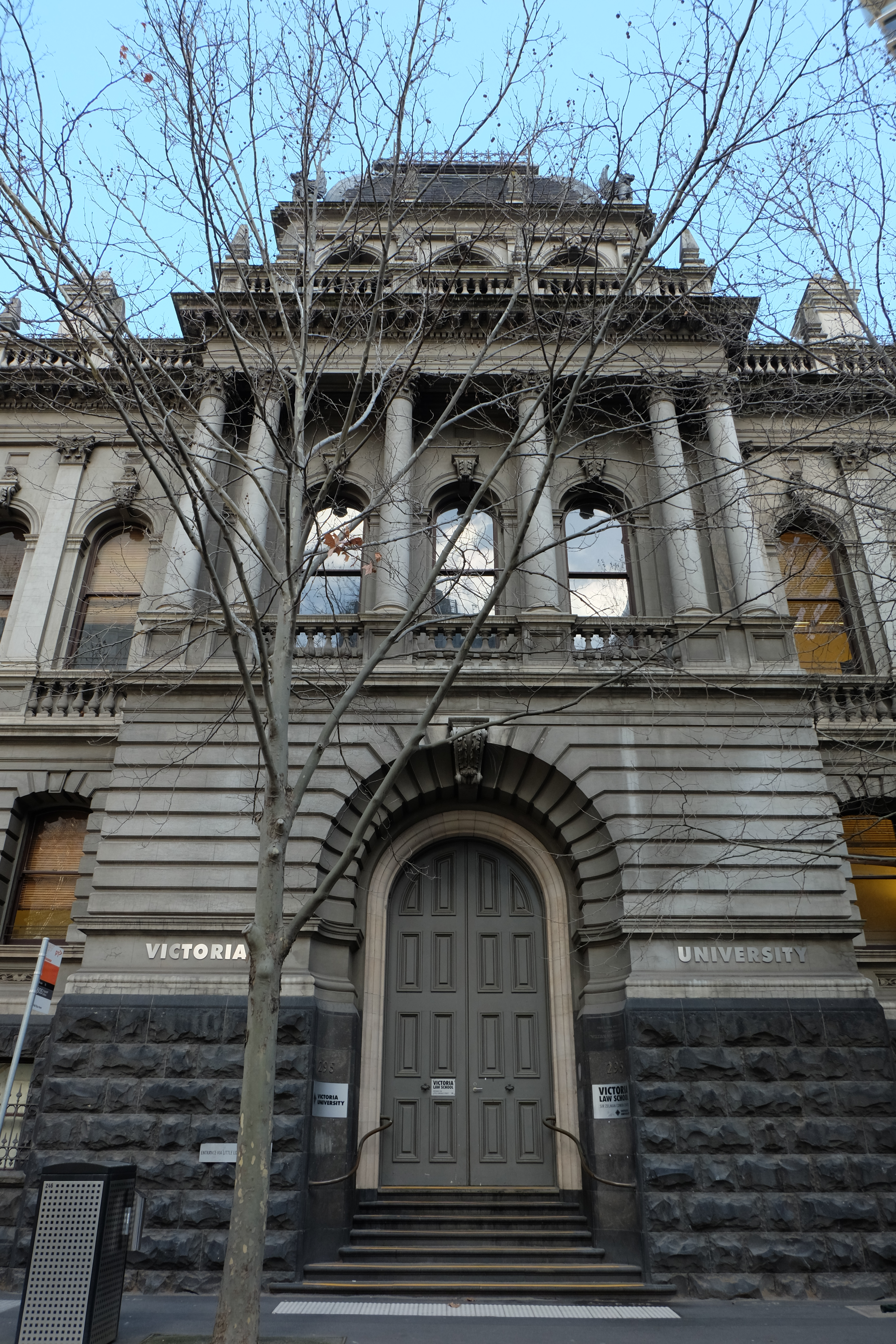
Former Records Office

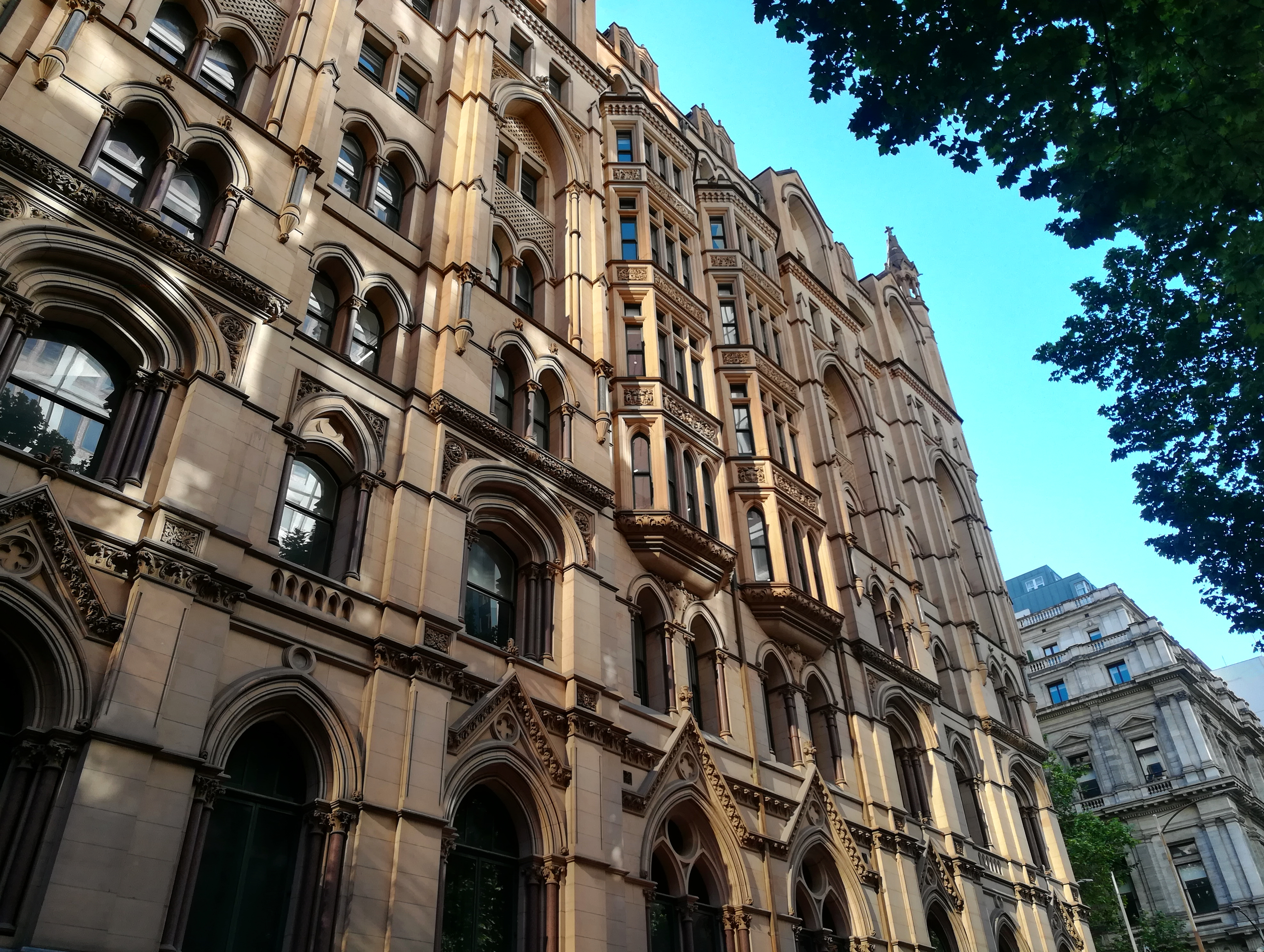
A. C. Goode House

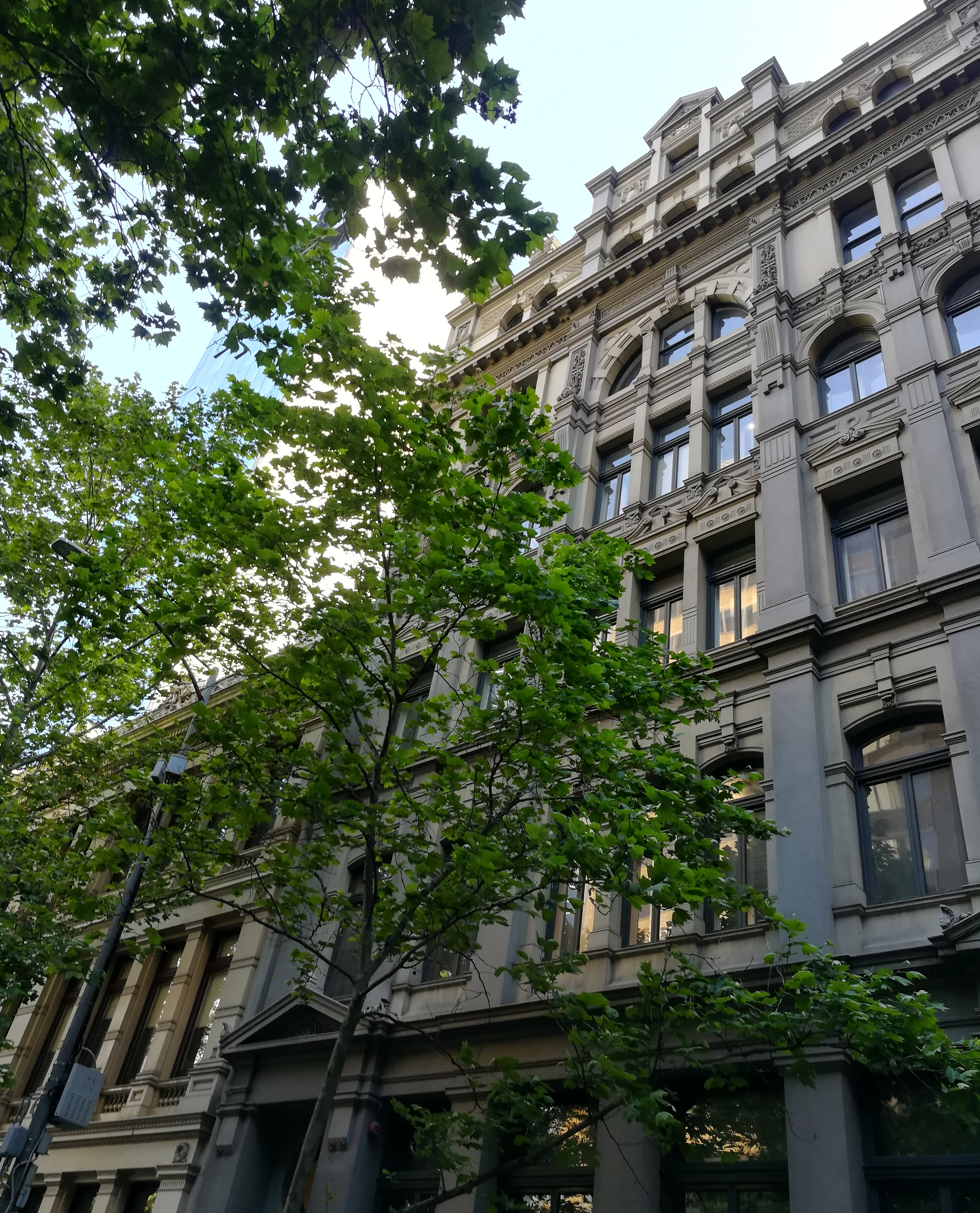
Lombard Building

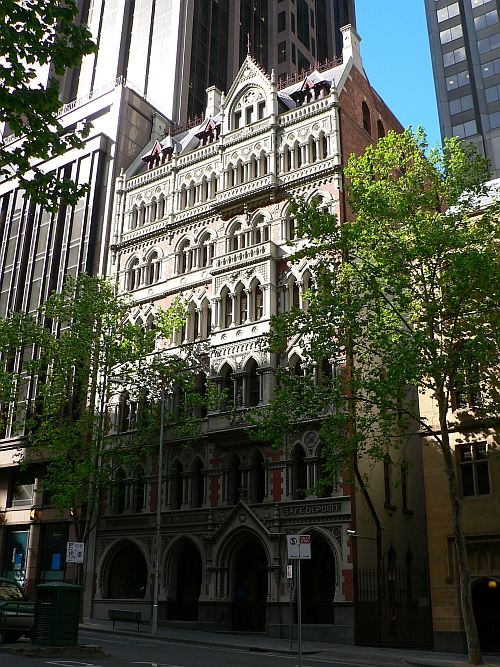
Melbourne Safe Deposit Building

== Queen Street massacre ==
On 8 December 1987 a gunman killed eight people and injured five others at the Australia Post offices at 191 Queen Street. The gunman Frank Vitkovic eventually fell from a building window taking the death toll to nine.

A memorial window for the victims is located at the General Post Office on Elizabeth and Bourke Streets.
