= 200 Queen Street =

Australian office building

Coordinates: 37.813539°S 144.960431°E

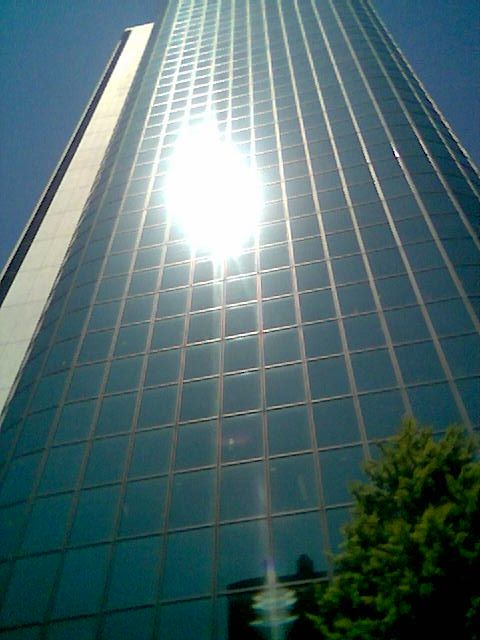
Northern Face of 200 Queen Street.

200 Queen Street, also known as 200Q and previously known as ACI House, is an office building in Melbourne. It is located at the north-east corner of Queen and Little Bourke Streets.

Around 130 metres in height, it has 32 full floors, plus two smaller floors atop that. It was the first high rise development in Melbourne by the Australian development firm, Grocon. The building was sold for $39 million in 1998 and again in 2003 for $78 million.

200 Queen Street was briefly featured in the Australian movie The Castle.

== Occupants ==
Occupants of the building include Aickin Chambers, Chancery Chambers, Melbourne Business Lawyers, SV Partners and the Melbourne office of the Australian Government Solicitor.
