= Elizabeth Street Common Ground =

Coordinates: 37°48′10″S 144°57′30″E

Elizabeth Street Common Ground Supportive Housing in Melbourne, Victoria, Australia is a supportive housing project that will provide 161 individuals and families with homes in Elizabeth Street, Melbourne by September 2010.

The project is a partnership between the Victorian government which has provided the majority of capital funding; the Federal Government, which has provided capital funding under the ‘A Place to Call Home’ program; the Victorian Property Fund; Yarra Community Housing, a registered housing association, as owner and landlord; HomeGround Services, a registered housing provider and the support services manager; and construction company Grocon, who are constructing the development at cost. Other partners are providing support through in-kind and pro bono services and funding for support services.

Elizabeth Street Common Ground will be an eleven storey building providing 131 homes based on the Common Ground model of supportive housing and another 30 affordable homes available to families. The building will provide operational offices for partner organisations as well as community facilities for tenants and a green roof garden.

== Supportive Housing ==
Elizabeth Street Common Ground Supportive Housing is based on a model of supportive housing known as the Common Ground model. This has been adapted from its original form in the US to suit Melbourne’s particular conditions.

Common Ground housing aims to provide a safe, secure, affordable and permanent housing option to people who have experienced chronic homelessness. Specifically, the project seeks to reduce the number of chronically homeless in Melbourne by providing a place where services are located on-site and support is provided in relation to mental health services, employment assistance and medical referrals. It is a facility with 24-hour concierge services, providing a permanent home. Each tenant will be linked to specific support services to suit their needs and situation.

Supportive housing has proven to be an effective solution to ending chronic homelessness for people who have high and complex needs and who have struggled to access and maintain housing in the past.

== Common Ground New York ==
Elizabeth Street Common Ground Supportive Housing project has connections with Common Ground (NYC).
