= 2018 Commonwealth Games Athletes Village =

Building complex in Queensland, Australia

Coordinates: 27.960941°S 153.387747°E

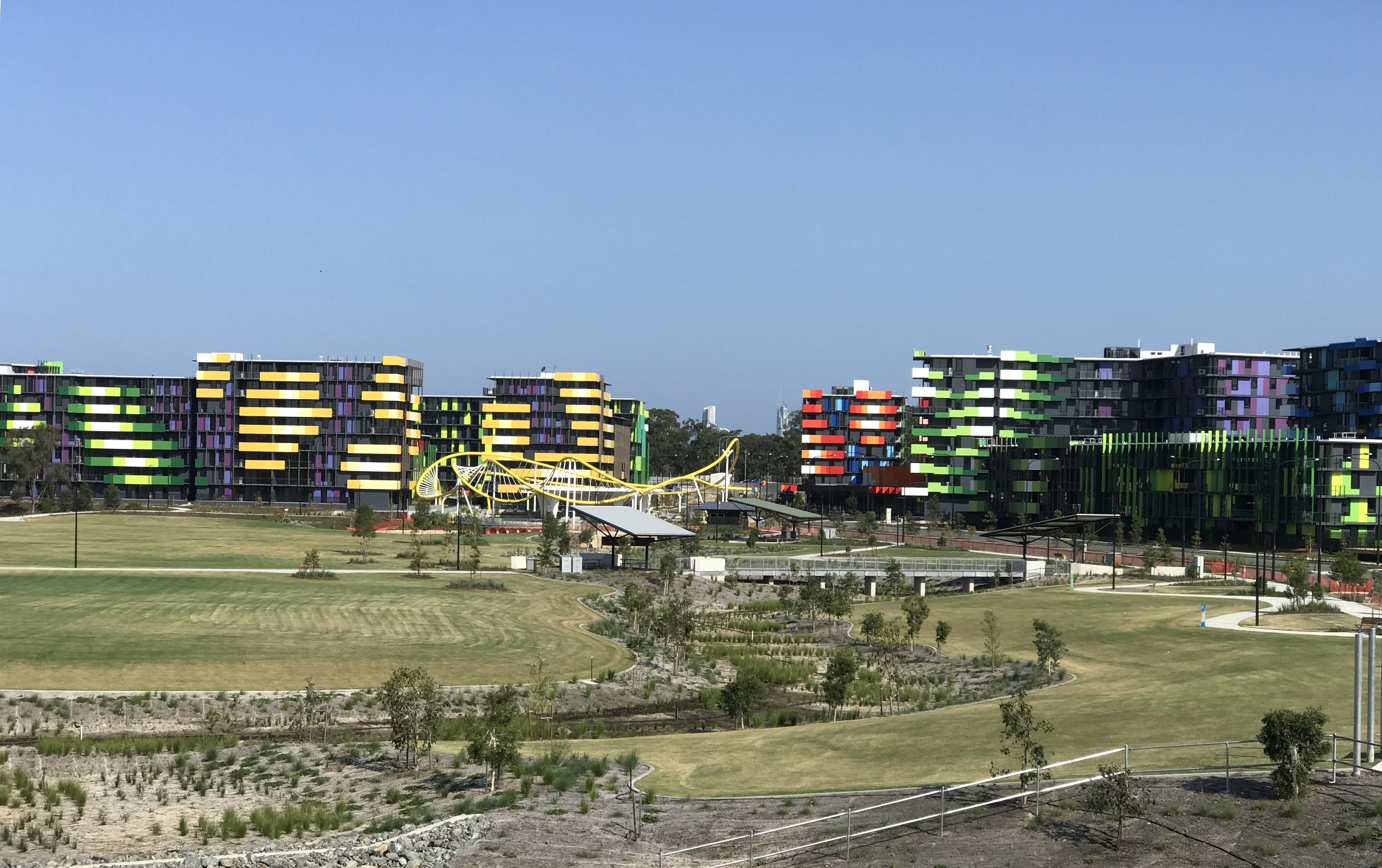
- Aerial view of the Athletes Village in 2018

General information
- Status: Completed
- Type: Athletic residences (originally) Residential, Offices (present)
- Location: 17 Village Bvd, Southport, 4215, Gold Coast, Queensland, Australia
- Construction started: 2015
- Completed: 2017
- Cost: A$550 million
- Owner: Smith Collective (2019–present)

Technical details
- Floor count: 8 (each)

Design and construction
- Architects: AAA - ARM Architecture, Arkhefield, Archipelago
- Developer: Grocon
- Main contractor: Grocon

The 2018 Commonwealth Games Athletes Village was an accommodation centre to house all participating athletes, as well as officials and athletic trainers of the 2018 Commonwealth Games. It was located in Southport, Gold Coast.

== Development ==
=== Priority development areas ===
The Economic Development Queensland (EDQ), Queensland Government’s specialist land use planning and property development unit, engages with state and local governments to identify areas of land for development within Queensland which are called Priority Development Areas (PDAs). PDAs are planned for development that provides commercial, industrial, residential and/or community development opportunities. The Minister for Economic Development Queensland (MEDQ) declare a PDA under the Economic Development Act 2012 and EDQ manages development projects in some PDAs.

=== Parklands redevelopment ===
A 29-hectare of area in Parklands which is three kilometres from Southport Central Business District and 3.6 kilometres east of the Pacific Motorway was identified by EDQ and declared as a PDA in 2013. The Parklands PDA was declared to facilitate the Athletes Village for the 2018 Commonwealth Games, which would be leased by the Gold Coast 2018 Commonwealth Games Corporation (GOLDOC) during the Games, and later the Gold Coast Health and Knowledge Precinct.

The Australian urban design and architecture firm, Archipelago Architects designed the original competition winning entry for the Commonwealth Games bid, and following a series of reference designs produced for cabinet to form an economic position on the project thereafter, Archipelago were appointed by EDQ to complete reference designs to assist in framing the PDA. Archipelago designed the master plan for the redevelopment of Parklands.

The design and delivery of the project was undertaken as a joint venture between Archipelago, Arkhefield and ARM Architecture. The project featured 1,252 housing units, comprising 1,170 one and two-bedroom apartments and 82 three-bedroom townhouses over 18 buildings with 8 floors each and a 'village heart' with over 5800 m^{2} of retail. The Dutch company Arcadis provided engineering inputs into the concept and feasibility phase through to delivery of the Parklands site .

Australian company Grocon was appointed to construct the infrastructure of the Parklands project and the construction work commenced in late 2015. Its construction cost was A$550 million over 1800 workers were involved in the site's construction.

Australian construction companies BMD Urban and JMac Constructions (JMac) (both belonging to BMD Group), constructed some of the works on the Parklands Project. BMD Urban constructed the community infrastructure in the project at a cost of A$65 million. JMac constructed the village heart at a cost of A$17 million.

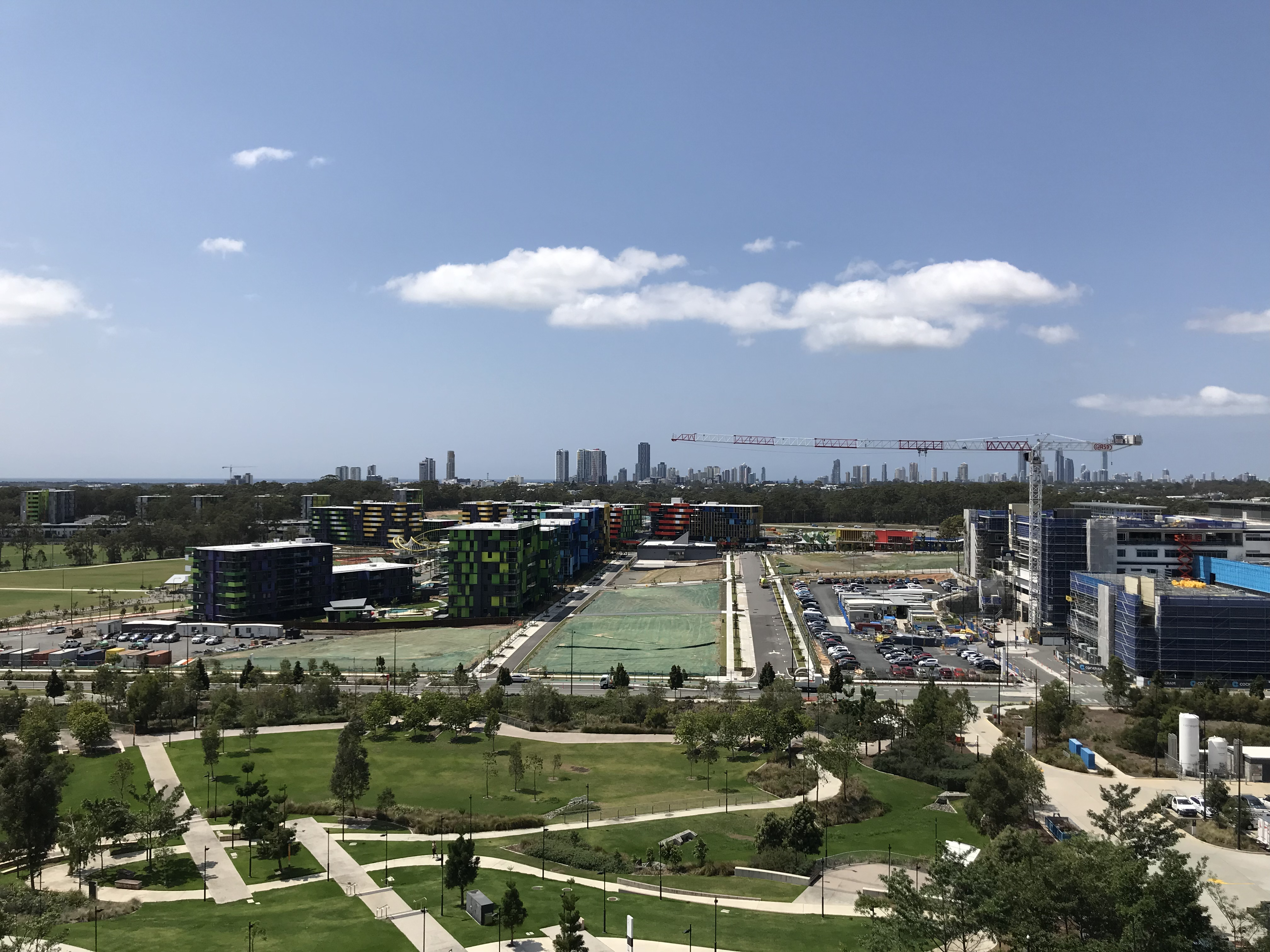
Parkland Redevelopment project under construction

=== Remodel to athletes village ===
The site was handed over to the GOLDOC in October 2017 which allowed them to complete its transformation into the Athletes Village for the 2018 Commonwealth Games. Australian property and infrastructure company Lendlease, appointed by GOLDOC, managed the overlay to the Athlete's Village which also included the development of the fully-equipped gymnasium and dining facilities in the Village.

=== Awards ===
The Parklands developments has been recognised extensively for excellence in planning and design:

- 2019 Urban Development Institute of Australia National Awards For Excellence - Award Of Excellence For Master Planned Development
- 2018 Queensland Government Department of State Development, Manufacturing, Infrastructure, and Planning | Minister's Awards for Urban Design
- 2018 Australian Institute of Architects (Queensland Chapter) | Karl Langer Award for Urban Design
- 2018 Australian Institute of Architects Gold Coast Chapter Awards - Regional Commendation For Urban Design
- 2018 Urban Developer Awards | Development of the Year - Communities
- 2018 Australian Institute Of Landscape Architects Queensland - Landscape Architecture Award For Civic Landscape
- 2018 Planning Institute of Australia - Urban Design Awards | Built Projects - City and Regional Scale
- 2018 Planning Institute of Australia Queensland Awards For Planning Excellence: Commendation For Great Place
- 2018 Urban Development Institute of Australia Queensland Awards For Excellence - President's Award
- 2018 Urban Development Institute Of Australia Queensland Awards For Excellence - Award Of Excellence For Master Planned Development
- 2018 Urban Development Institute of Australia Queensland Awards For Excellence - Award Of Excellence For Consultant's Excellence
- 2017 City of Gold Coast Urban Design Awards | Helen Josephson Award for Urban Design Leadership
- 2017 City of Gold Coast Urban Design Awards | Excellence in Urban Design Award
- 2017 Planning Institute of Australia - Urban Design Awards | Built Projects - City and Regional Scale

== Facilities ==
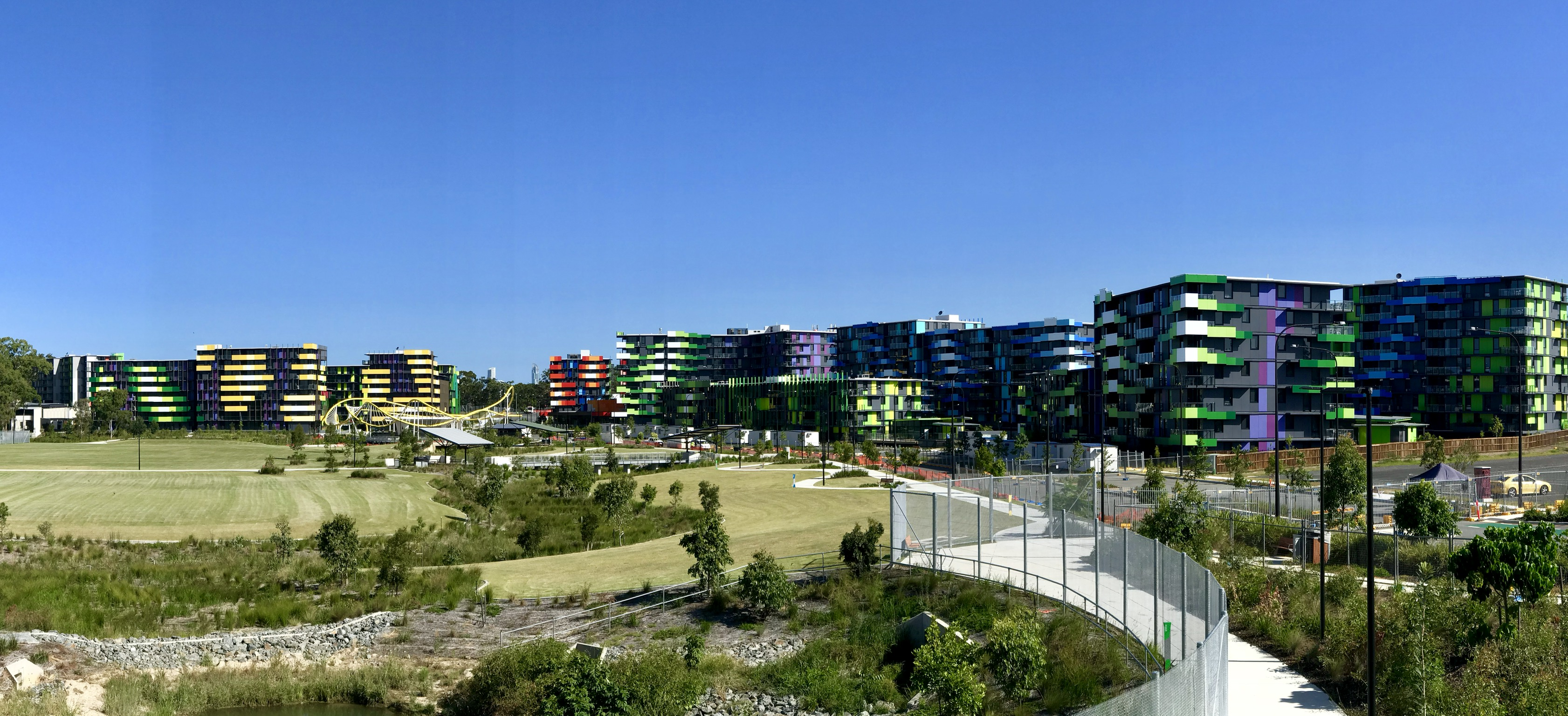
The Athletes Village for the 2018 Commonwealth Games

The Athletes Village was officially opened from 25 March 2018 and provided accommodation and services to 6,600 athletes and officials in 1252 permanent dwellings. There were 1170 one and two-bedroom apartments and 82 three-bedroom townhouses. The village had three zones - International, Residential and Operational.

The residential zone accommodated athletes and officials and also offered recreation, gym and medical facilities. The gym was designed by the Australian Institute of Sport and equipment in the gym was sponsored by Technogym. Adjoining the gym was the Athlete Recovery Area.

The International Zone consisted of retail services, shops and a self service buffet-style dining hall. The Festival 2018 events were also held in the International Zone. The Dining hall served over 18,000 meals per day to the athletes during the Games. Australian telecommunications company Optus opened a store in the International zone named "Yes Optus Store" which provided free calling services to the athletes and officials and other services such as phone charging and watching events of the Games in televisions. Optus also provided free Wifi services in the village. Athletes claimed that the Athletes Village was better than the Olympic Village built for the 2016 Summer Olympics in Rio de Janeiro.

== Post use ==
All apartments are currently offered for long-term rent generally for tenants from the Griffith University’s Gold Coast campus, Gold Coast University Hospital, Gold Coast Private Hospital and the Southport Central Business District. The complex has been renamed to "Smith Collective". BWS and Woolworths also opened their stores in the complex in early 2019.

== See also ==
- Venues of the 2018 Commonwealth Games
