= ANZ Bank Centre =

Office building in Sydney, Australia

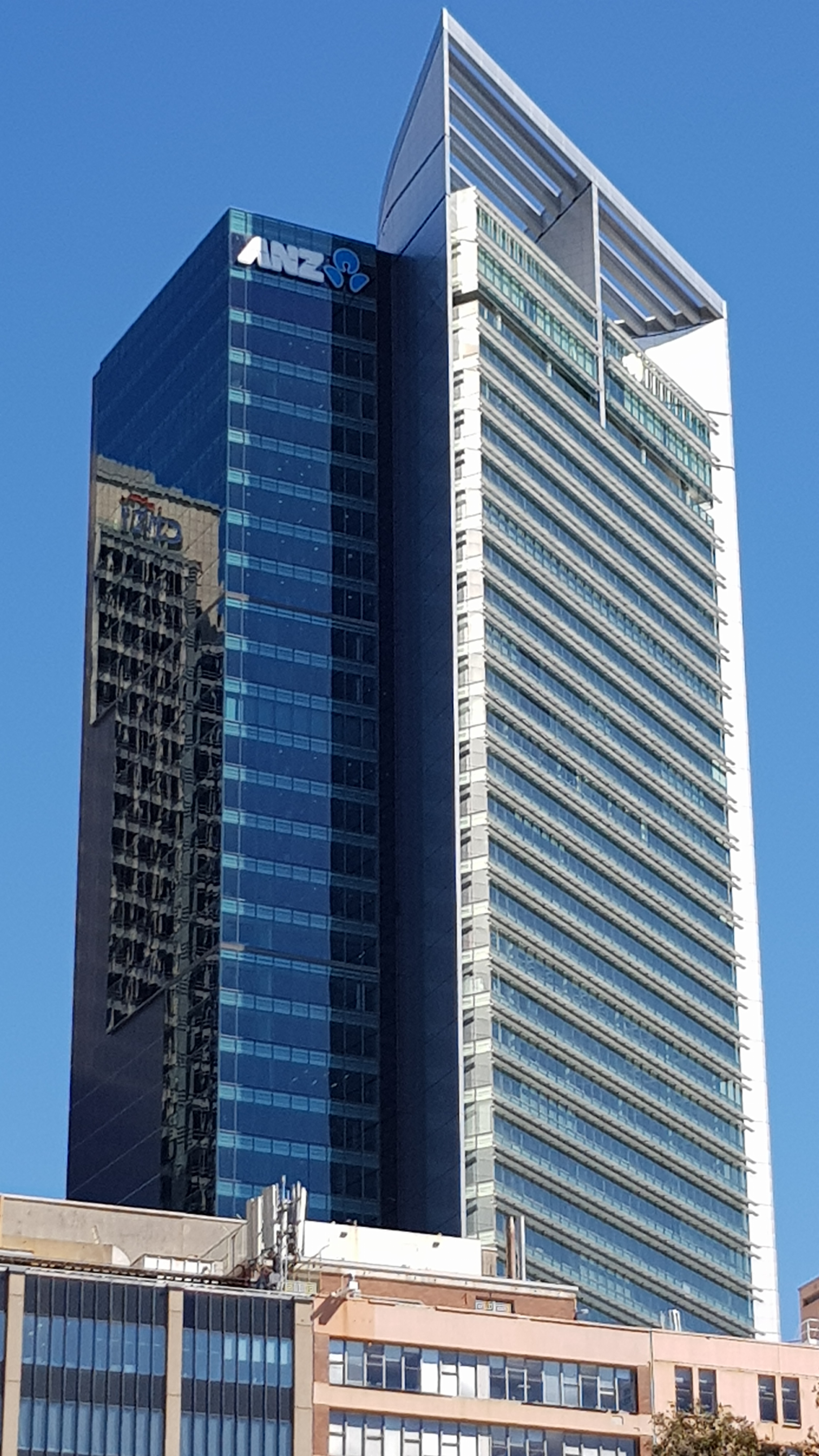
- The tower in September 2018

General information
- Status: Completed
- Type: Office
- Location: 161 Castlereagh Street, Sydney, New South Wales, Australia
- Coordinates: 33°51′57.4″S 151°12′41.9″E
- Construction started: 2010
- Completed: April 2013
- Cost: A$ 800 million
- Owner: GPT Group (50%); IFM Investors (50%)

Height
- Architectural: 195 m (640 ft)
- Roof: 180 m (590 ft)

Technical details
- Floor count: 46
- Floor area: 58,316 m^{2} (627,700 sq ft)

Design and construction
- Architect: Francis-Jones Morehen Thorp (FJMT)
- Developer: Grocon
- Main contractor: Grocon

Website
- www.161castlereagh.com.au

ANZ Bank Centre is a commercial building in Sydney, New South Wales, Australia. The skyscraper measured to the top of its roof is 180 metres (591 ft) tall, with an architectural height of 195 metres (640 ft).

== Description ==
The glass style building was designed by Francis-Jones Morehen Thorp (FJMT), a Sydney-based architectural firm and construction was carried out by Grocon, a Melbourne-based developer.

Located at 161 Castlereagh Street, a large pedestrian plaza links Castlereagh Street with Pitt Street. The tower mostly feature commercial use, with the ANZ Bank signing up for naming rights and a large amount of floor space. Retail space will be available at ground level with frontages to both Castlereagh and Pitt Streets.

The topping out ceremony, marking the completion of the building's structure, was held on 13 July 2012. Construction of the A$800 million tower was completed in April 2013.

A private penthouse located on two levels, levels 43 and 44, with a rooftop pool and terrace is accessible by a one-stop private lift.

Legion House, a heritage listed building located at the site has been redeveloped into unique office accommodation as part of the project.

The lift system for ANZ Bank Centre was supplied by Schindler. Traveling at speeds of 9 metres per second (30 ft/s), they are the fastest lifts in Australia.

=== Major tenants ===
- ANZ Bank - 29,000 m^{2} (310,000 sq ft)
- Herbert Smith Freehills - 18,500 m^{2} (199,000 sq ft)

== See also ==
- List of tallest buildings in Sydney
- List of tallest buildings in Australia
