= Launch Housing =

Melbourne-based community organisation

- Type: Non-governmental organization
- Purpose: Services for people experiencing or at risk of homelessness.
- Location: Melbourne, Victoria, Australia
- Region served: Melbourne, Victoria, Australia
- Method: Homelessness support services and research projects.
- Key people: Sherri Bruinhout (CEO)
- Website: www.launchhousing.org.au

Launch Housing is a secular Melbourne-based organisation that works to reduce homelessness among Victorians.

The organisation formed from the merger of Hanover Welfare Services and HomeGround Services on 1 July 2015. Like its predecessors, Launch Housing provides housing and support, as well as advocacy for policy change.

== History ==
=== Hanover ===
Hanover was founded in 1964 as one of the first specialist homeless support agencies in Melbourne. The name was taken from Hanover Street in Fitzroy, where the organisation was first based.

Reflecting the social and policy movements which it formed under, Hanover was established with no structural links to governments, churches or institutions and incorporated as a non-profit company managed by a board of directors. Initially its primary focus was support for homeless men in the inner city. Over the past 45 years this scope has broadened significantly.

In 1969, under the leadership of Bob U’Ren, Hanover began a campaign against the closure of Gordon House, at that time a 400 bed commercial common lodging house for homeless men. The early 1970s also saw a small number of women beginning to use homeless services set up for men. In 1972 Hanover was incorporated under the Companies Act. In 1972 management of Gordon House was taken over by Hanover until it was decommissioned in 1976. In 1976 Hanover opened the new Gordon House at 20 Lorimer Street in Melbourne.

The 1980s saw a sustained focus on providing services that addressed the specific needs of people experiencing homelessness, including the establishment of the joint Commonwealth and State Government funded Supported Accommodation Assistance Program. This led to a period of expansion of support and programs delivered by Hanover. Under new leadership in the early 1990s, Hanover was restructured, and funding from the State and Federal Governments enabled the redevelopment of Gordon House. During this time specific services were developed targeting the particular needs of families, single women and young adults.

At the same time, Hanover’s research focus was strengthened, and Michael Horn was appointed as Hanover Research Manager in 1991.

=== HomeGround Services ===
HomeGround Services logo

HomeGround Services was formed in December 2002 from the merger of two like-minded organizations to combine the housing experience of Argyle Street Housing and the support and outreach experience of Outreach Victoria. It was a homelessness, housing and support agency working to end homelessness in Melbourne, Victoria, Australia. It was part of the Australian Common Ground Alliance, which is affiliated with Common Ground (NYC). HomeGround Services has offices were in Collingwood, Victoria; Preston, Victoria; St Kilda, Victoria; Prahran, Victoria; and at Elizabeth Street Common Ground in the CBD.

HomeGround Services’ vision to work towards ending homelessness in Melbourne coincides with recent federal and state progress in this direction. The Australian Government has released its White Paper on Homelessness, which includes targets for reducing the number of people who are homeless, and the Victorian Government committed to a new Victorian Homelessness Strategy. However, a number of factors continue to contribute to homelessness including:

- Housing affordability.
- Family and other crises.
- A limited supply of, and poor access to, affordable and supportive housing.

==== Clients ====
HomeGround Services worked with a diverse range of clients including those referred from mainstream health organizations, the mental health sector, criminal justice, child protection and others. Its practices, approaches and models in dealing with its clients are based on international best practice on homelessness.

==== Client numbers ====
Annually, HomeGround Services provided:

- Assistance to 9000 homeless households in crisis or at risk of homelessness to find shelter and long-term housing.
- Management of around 330 transitional housing properties.
- Support to more than 700 public housing households in order to prevent eviction.

==== Activities ====
HomeGround Services worked in the areas of homelessness, housing, support services and social change advocacy.

Its services included:

- Crisis housing advice service (Initial Assessment and Planning)
- Housing Outreach Worker program
- Justice Housing Support Program
- Mental health programs including ConnectED and the Housing Mental Health Pathways Program
- Outreach programs
- Private Rental Access Program
- Private Rental Management Program
- Social Housing Advocacy and Support Program
- Supportive Housing Development
- Tenancy and Property program
- Advocacy

HomeGround Services was a partner in the Elizabeth Street Common Ground (Melbourne, Australia) supportive housing project that aimed to deliver more than 131 homes based on the Common Ground model in Elizabeth Street, central Melbourne in October 2010. HomeGround Services will provide the associated health, training, support and employment services to be located on the site.

In 2009 HomeGround Services joined with 40 other organizations in Call this a home? campaign for safe rooming houses in Victoria, advocating for reform of Victoria’s private rooming house sector.

HomeGround Services won the tender for Victoria's Melbourne Street to Home program in partnership with The Salvation Army and working with the Royal District Nursing Service. Melbourne Street to Home is another key model from the Federal White Paper on Homelessness.

In July 2015 it merged with Hanover to become Launch Housing.

== Services ==
Hanover provides a range of services to people experiencing homelessness, at risk of homelessness or housing crisis. These include: Crisis Accommodation, Medium term and transitional housing, Support, Early Intervention programs, Education programs, Health, Nutrition and wellbeing programs.

== See also ==
- Housing Commission of Victoria
- Homelessness in Australia
- Supported Accommodation Assistance Program
