= Governor Phillip Tower =

Skyscraper in Sydney, New South Wales, Australia

Coordinates: 33.863859°S 151.211202°E

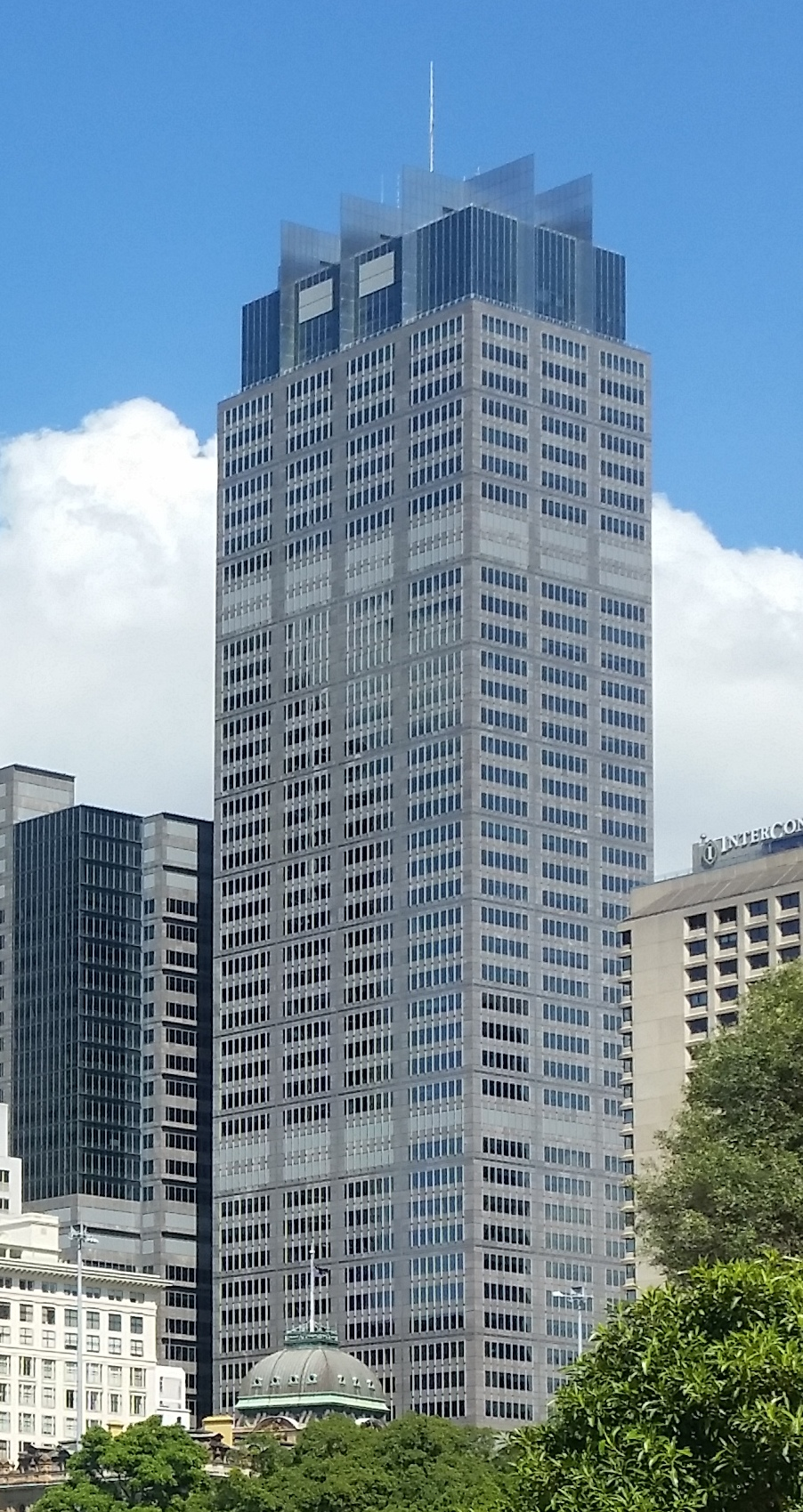
- Interactive map of the Governor Phillip Tower area

General information
- Type: Commercial skyscraper
- Location: Sydney central business district, New South Wales, Australia
- Construction started: 1990
- Completed: 1993
- Owner: Dexus (50%); GPT (25%); Australian Prime Property Fund

Height
- Architectural: 227 metres (745 ft) (official height)
- Antenna spire: 254 metres (833 ft) (unofficial height)

Technical details
- Floor count: 62
- Floor area: 55,000 square metres (590,000 sq ft)

Design and construction
- Architect: Denton Corker Marshall
- Structural engineer: Ove Arup Partners
- Main contractor: Grocon

Governor Phillip Tower, Governor Macquarie Tower and the Museum of Sydney are the main elements of a large development in the Sydney central business district in the state of New South Wales, Australia. Completed in 1994, the property development complex occupies an elevated site in the north-east area of the central business district. The complex incorporates the site of the first Government House, one of Australia's earliest and most significant sites of European heritage. The address is 1 Farrer Place. Designed by architects Denton Corker Marshall and built by Grocon, at the time of its completion it was regarded as achieving new standards for Sydney commercial architecture in terms of finish quality and design.

The northern end of the site, which faces Bridge Street, contains the remains of the first Government House. Integral to the development was the conservation of the archaeological remains and their incorporation into the Museum of Sydney, which was built and opened alongside the development.

The complex comprises five main components: Governor Phillip Tower, Governor Macquarie Tower, First Government House Plaza, the Museum of Sydney, and two rows of terraces converted to boutique office space.

== History ==
With construction starting only months after the arrival of the British First Fleet in 1788, the First Government House dates from the very start of Australian European History. It was the first substantial building to be constructed in Australia. The elevated site was prominent, overlooking Sydney Cove, and the building was at the centre of its colonial government and commerce for the first 60 years. It was demolished in 1845 although significant foundation remains have now been conserved and interpreted. The First Government House site is one of six sites in the Sydney area listed on the Department of the Environment National Heritage List.

The northern Bridge Street end of the site remained vacant for 50 years. In the 1970s and 80s criticism grew over the hole in the prestigious centre of Sydney's finance district, an area of imposing sandstone buildings and colonial history, with several modern premium office towers interspersed. In 1982 a development application for a high rise office building was approved but archaeological investigations in 1983 revealed parts of the footings of First Government House. A new-found awareness around Australia of the nation's history was emerging at the time, and the suggestion of a high rise office building on the top of such a significant historical site met with wide opposition.

The Government of New South Wales found a solution by transferring floor space from the area containing the historical foundation to space immediately behind to the south. Space owned by developer Sid Londish was used, who masterminded the amalgamation of the whole site, making the project commercially viable. The resultant site covers a whole block bound by Bridge, Bent, Phillip and Young streets.

== Property developments ==
=== Governor Phillip Tower ===
Governor Phillip Tower dominates the site. It sits 10 floors above street level on a series of large zinc-plated transfer beams atop a 4-level sandstone-clad podium (upon which Governor Macquarie Tower also sits). This maximises views, and hence rentals, for all levels. Opinion, however, is mixed on how well this massive 10-storey base contributes to the building's relationship with the street.

The façade is of grey granite and glass used to achieve an expensive and highly detailed finish. The steel-bladed roof features have been dubbed the milk-crate.

At 227 m (745 ft), it is the seventh tallest building in the city by roof height and eleventh by architectural height, although the taller 25 Martin Place and World Tower are both only fractionally taller at 228 m (748 ft). When measured to the tip of the building's antenna, it stands at a height of 254 m (833 ft), although this measurement is deemed unofficial as antennas are excluded from official heights as per the CTBUH's measurement standards. It is arguably the most visually dominating building on the Sydney CBD skyline. From many prominent angles, and significantly from most Sydney Harbour viewpoints, it appears as the tallest building on the skyline by a large margin; however, this is perspective illusion.

=== Governor Macquarie Tower ===
Governor Macquarie Tower
- Interactive map of the Governor Macquarie Tower area

General information
- Type: Skyscraper
- Location: Central business district, Sydney, New South Wales, Australia
- Construction started: 1990
- Completed: 1993
- Owner: Dexus Property Group (50%); GPT (25%); Australian Prime Property Fund

Technical details
- Floor count: 41
- Floor area: 30,500 square metres (328,000 sq ft)

Design and construction
- Architect: Denton Corker Marshall
- Structural engineer: Ove Arup Partners
- Main contractor: Grocon

Governor Macquarie Tower stands at 41 stories and is adjacent and south of Governor Phillip Tower. It has identical façade treatments but its form and massing are significantly different with no dramatic roof structure, and it has staggered, rather than sheer lines. The primary tenant is Minter Ellison. It occupies the site of the former Legal & General building which at the time was the tallest building to have been demolished in Sydney.

The main entry to both buildings is from Farrer Place. They share a large and impressive foyer, which links the two buildings and provides another entrance from Phillip Street.

=== First Government House and Museum of Sydney ===
First Government House Plaza is an open-air public space and part of the Museum of Sydney, situated at Bridge Street end. The design is minimalist and disciplined, intended to evoke a sense of the site's past. Paving covers most of the First Government House remains. However, the individual pavers can be removed and the remains viewed through a glass pyramid. The outline of the original building is marked through the paving pattern.

=== Reaction ===
Criticism of the complex has included the vast, even oppressive scale of the main tower, particularly at street level, and a perceived awkward and disjointed relationship between the two towers.

Architecturally, the museum and plaza are considered by many to be the most successful aspect of the development. And although the massive and dominating structure's relationship to the street has often been questioned, it is widely recognised as a development of very high quality; “This is no cheap, slap-stick developer job. Nor is it post-modern New York deco pastiche...one of the most interesting and important building developments that Sydney has seen...and adding a great deal of intellectual content and game-playing.” said architectural critic Francesca Morrison.

== Depictions in popular culture ==
The tower was featured throughout the film Mission: Impossible 2 (2000), where it serves as the headquarters of the fictional BioCyte pharmaceuticals corporation.

It also served as the location of the restaurant Le Vrai in the movie Matrix Reloaded.

== Gallery ==
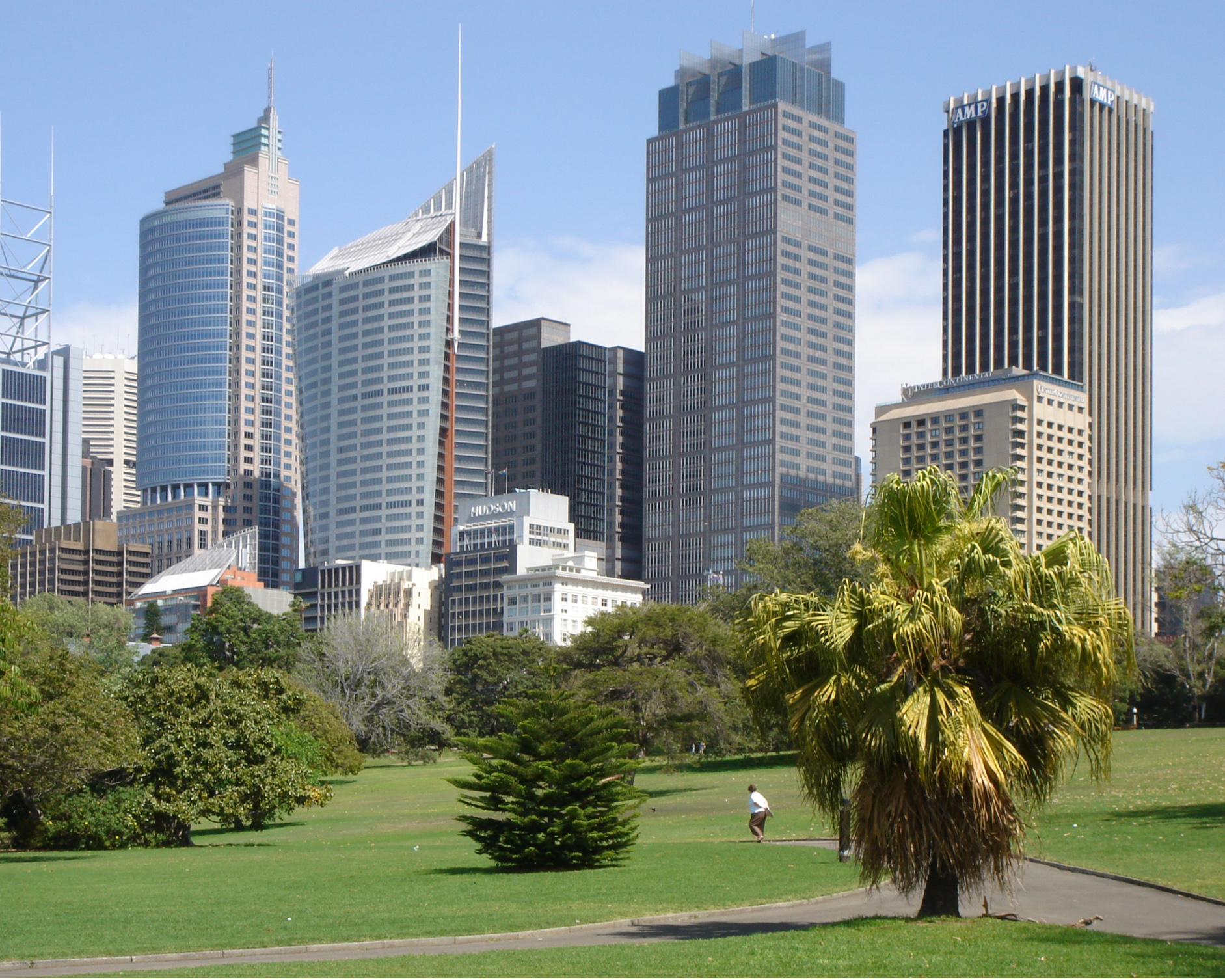
Governor Phillip Tower (second from the right) and the AMP Centre, Aurora Place and Chifley Tower

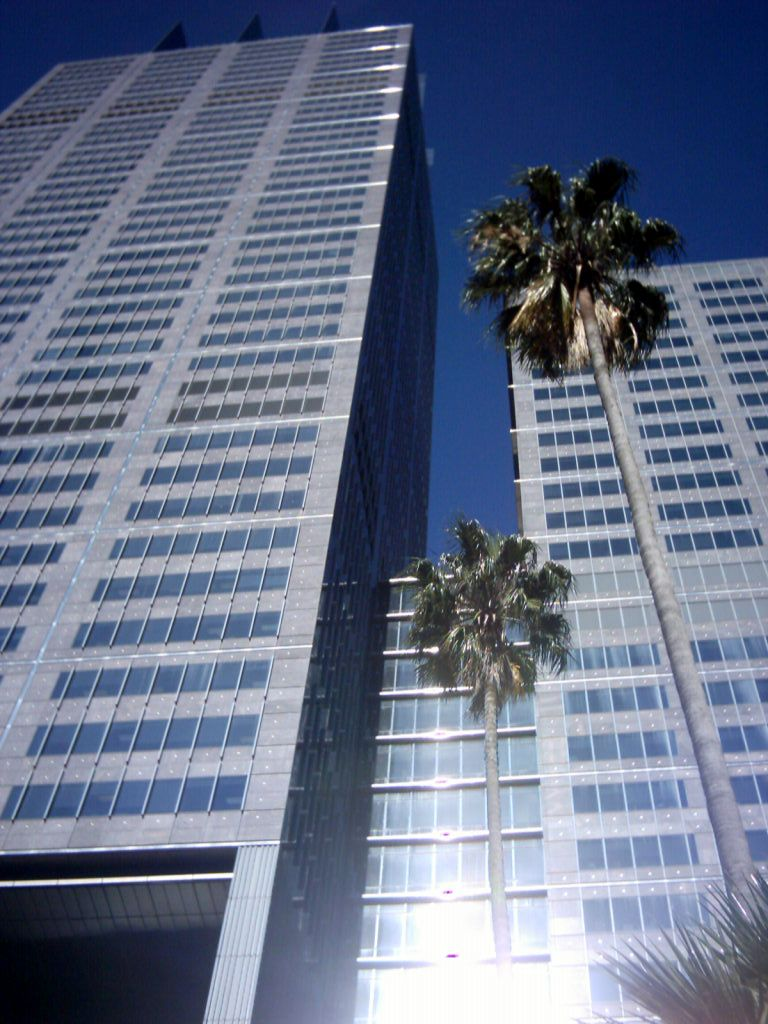
Governor Phillip Tower and Governor Macquarie Tower

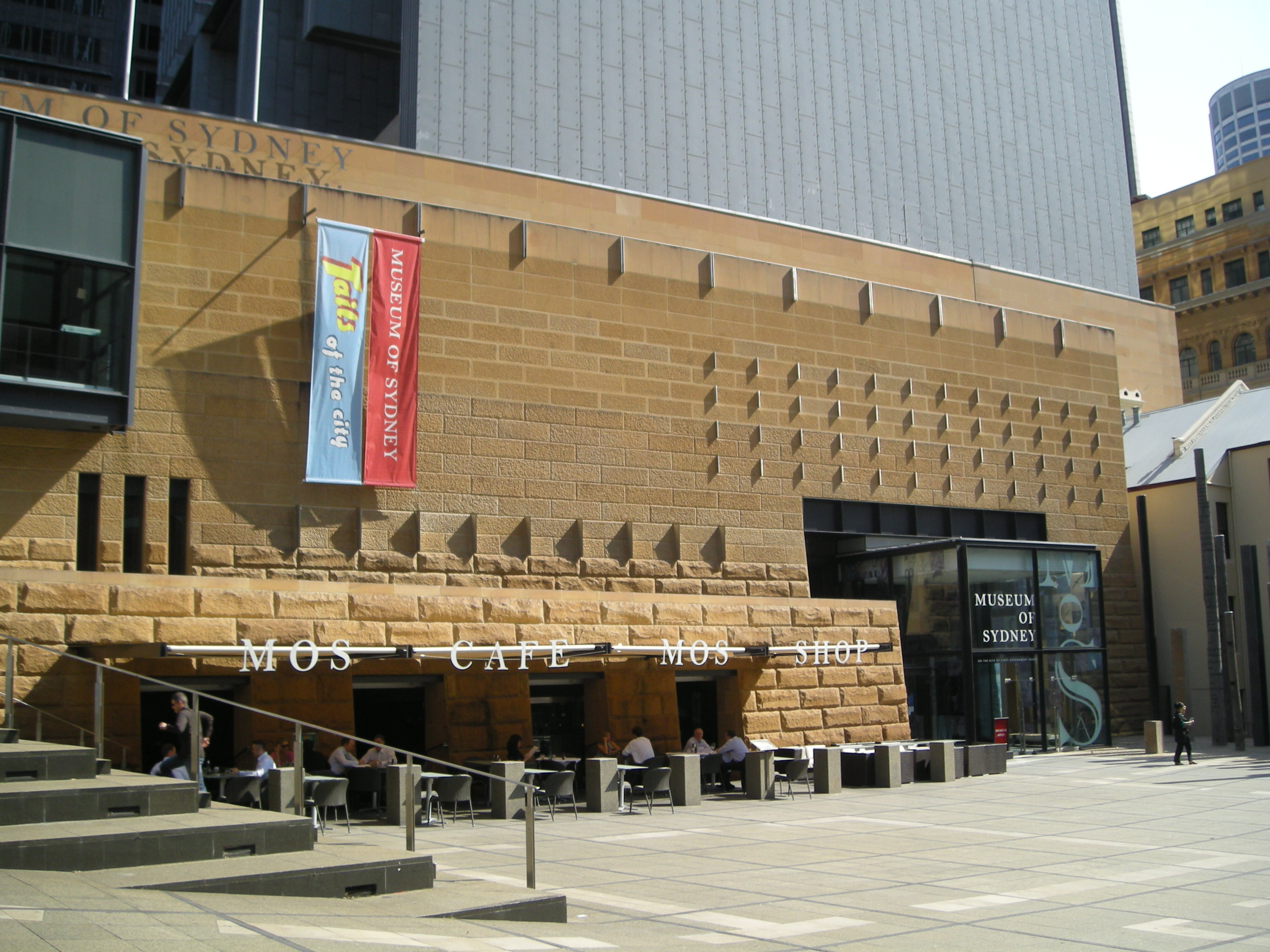
Main entrance to the Museum of Sydney. Note the outline of the First Government House foundations built into the pavement.

== See also ==
- Skyscrapers in Sydney
- List of tallest buildings in Australia
- First Government House, Sydney
