= WorkSafe Victoria =

Government agency of Victoria, Australia

- Victorian WorkCover Authority

Authority overview
- Formed: 1 December 1992; 33 years ago
- Preceding agencies: Accident Compensation Commission; Victorian Accident Rehabilitation Council; WorkCare Appeals Board
- Type: Statutory authority
- Jurisdiction: Victoria, Australia
- Headquarters: Geelong
- Employees: 1,074 (June 2017)
- Minister responsible: Rt Hon Ben Carroll, MP, Minister for WorkSafe and the TAC
- Authority executives: Cathy Henderson, CEO; Bob Cameron, Chair of the Board
- Key documents: Workplace Injury Rehabilitation and Compensation Act 2013; Occupational Health and Safety Act 2004
- Website: www.worksafe.vic.gov.au
- Agency ID: PROV VA 3081

WorkSafe Victoria is the trading name of the Victorian WorkCover Authority, a statutory authority of the state government of Victoria, Australia.

== History ==
After being renamed in 2014 as Victorian WorkCover Authority by Minister Gordon Rich-Phillips, it returned to the WorkSafe trading name after the election of the Labor Government in November 2014. It has had a number of previous names including VWA, WorkCare and the Department of Labour. The name WorkSafe became the trading name for the workplace health and safety and workers compensation divisions in mid-2008, as it reflected the objective of encouraging people to work safely and reduce workplace injuries.

The organisation reports to a Minister and has a Board. The Chief Executive is Cathy Henderson.

A review of WorkSafe and the Geelong-based Transport Accident Commission was announced in February 2015 by the Victorian Government.

From July 2018, WorkSafe's headquarters has been 1 Malop Street, Geelong VIC 3220.

== Company Practices ==
=== Corporate objectives ===
WorkSafe's corporate aims are to take a constructive, accountable, transparent, effective, and caring approach to all its operations.

Although being active in carrying out workplace safety inspections across the state and prosecuting breaches of workplace health, safety, and workers' compensation laws, a significant focus of WorkSafe's activity includes communication with internal and external stakeholders, media (including publishing details of significant incidents and prosecutions) and the wider community.

WorkSafe runs advertising and social media campaigns, an annual small/medium business roadshow (May–June), and events such as WorkSafe Health and Safety Month (October of each year), farming sector field days, and conferences where speakers from WorkSafe present information on general and specialist topics.

=== Workplace health and safety ===
WorkSafe employs safety inspectors based at 12 offices in Melbourne (City, Narre Warren, Essendon Fields, Mulgrave) and regional Victoria (Ballarat, Bendigo, Geelong, Mildura, Shepparton, Traralgon, Wangaratta, and Warrnambool) and conducts targeted visits based on identified high-risk industries and in response to calls where dangers are identified. There is also a 24/7 emergency response assistance.

=== Workers compensation and return to work ===
WorkSafe oversees Victoria's workers' compensation system which provides financial as well as health and related support to people who have been hurt in the course of their work. The system is funded by Victorian employers who pay a percentage of their total remuneration which provides insurance cover. In 2011 with increases to the average premium rates in other jurisdictions, the Victoria premium became Australia's lowest at 1.338%.

With the Victorian state budget in May 2012, this position was further reinforced for 2012–13 (June to June) with a further reduction to 1.229%. The amount paid by individual employers varies depending on their personal claims performance and that of their industry—i.e. a 'good' performing employer in an industry with many claims may pay rather less than others, while conversely, a poorly performing employer will pay more. Around 29,000 people a year make a workers' compensation claim (10.58/1000 employees in Victoria in 2010/11).

WorkSafe promotes to employers, injured workers and the people who treat them, the idea of an early and sustainable return to work. This helps keep business and premium costs down and benefits injured workers. Where it is not possible for a worker to return to their old workplace, WorkSafe's support program, WISE, which encourages other employers to step in and take advantage of their skills.

=== Legislation and regulations ===
WorkSafe is the regulator for a wide range of Acts of Parliament; primarily: the Workplace Injury Rehabilitation and Compensation Act 2013; Occupational Health and Safety Act 2004; Accident Compensation Act 1985; Accident Compensation (Occupational Health and Safety) Act 1996; Workers Compensation Act 1958; Equipment (Public Safety) Act 1994; and Dangerous Goods Act 1985.

These Acts are supplemented with various regulations; primarily: the Workplace Injury Rehabilitation and Compensation Regulations 2024; Occupational Health and Safety Regulations 2017; Equipment (Public Safety) Regulations 2017; Dangerous Goods (HCDG) Regulations 2016; Dangerous Goods (Explosives) Regulations 2022; Dangerous Goods (Transport by Road or Rail) Regulations 2018; Dangerous Goods (Storage and Handling) Regulations 2022; and Magistrates' Court (Occupational Health and Safety) Rules 2015.

== Director Board ==
Mr Krasnostein and Ms Cosgrove were appointed by the previous Liberal Government and were charged with the responsibility of restructuring the organisation. This led to substantial job losses which resulted in the loss of many senior managers and experienced staff. Ms Cosgrove announced the start of the restructure program in June 2012 after the Queens Birthday long weekend in an email to staff which describes how she had had a pleasant weekend at the spa town of Daylesford in regional Victoria and that job losses would be the product of restructuring that would begin immediately. It took some weeks for the story to be reported. Their sudden resignations on 3 March 2015 were announced in a State Government news release were said to have been due to the loss of confidence in WorkSafe's leadership and the handling of chemical contamination of the soil and a cancer cluster at the Country Fire Authority's Fiskville training facility near Ballarat, however there had been a number of other senior officials who had also resigned since the government's election including Country Fire Authority CEO Mick Bourke, and the board of Ambulance Victoria. In an unusual move after the resignations of Ms Cosgrove and Mr Krasnostein, Minister Robin Scott spoke to staff at WorkSafe's headquarters and re-affirmed the government's support for WorkSafe's health and safety priorities which was widely seen as having been undermined under by the previous government.

== Occupational Health and Safety Act ==
The Occupational Health and Safety Act was enacted in 1985 as a major reform of the Labor government of John Cain II.

The Act was reviewed, by Chris Maxwell QC (Queens Counsel) now a Judge of the Court of Appeal becoming the Occupational Health and Safety Act 2004.

The 'new' Act broadly reflected the requirements of the OHS Act 1985.

The most basic of duties requires employers to provide a safe workplace for employees and people other than employees (Sections 23 and 24).

The 2004 Act greatly increased potential fines from a maximum of $250,000 to more than $900,000. The highest fine yet was imposed in August 2008 when the brewer, Fosters was convicted and fined $1.125 million for two breaches of the Act.

A range of alternate penalties have also been introduced and are sought in some cases. These include adverse publicity orders (Section 135), safety improvement projects (Section 136), and enforceable undertakings (Section 137).

The Duties of Directors and company officers (Section 144) have also been included along with new powers to obtain information (Section 9), the creation of ARREOs (Authorised Representatives of Employee Associations) (Sections 87–94), a duty to consult on matters affecting health and safety (Sections 35 and 36) and a significant change which allow for the internal review of inspectors decisions (Sections 127 to 129).
