= List of tallest structures in Australia =

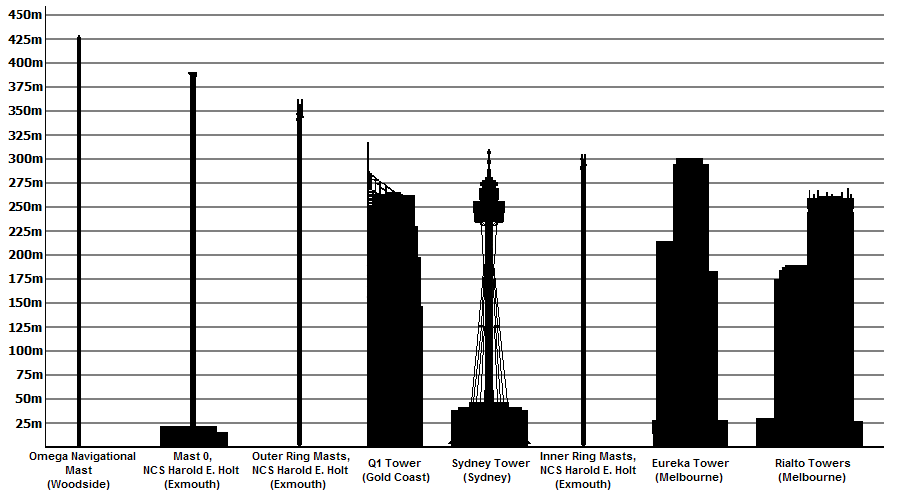
The current tallest buildings and structures in Australia.

Formerly, the tallest structure in Australia was the Omega Navigational Mast Woodside in Woodside, Victoria. The Omega Tower was demolished by Liberty Industrial on behalf of the Department of Defence on 22 April 2015 following the death of a young base jumper in 2014 after his parachute failed to open.

== Tallest structures ==
This is a list of the tallest structures in Australia. This list contains guyed masts, towers, skyscrapers and chimneys with a height of 200 metres or more.

Rank	Name	Pinnacle height		Year completed	Location	Coordinates	Remarks	Ref.
Rank	Name	(m)	(ft)	Year completed	Location	Coordinates	Remarks	Ref.
1	Tower Zero of Naval Communication Station Harold E. Holt	389	1276	1967	Exmouth, Western Australia	21°48′58.78″S 114°09′56.2″E	Guyed mast (VLF-Transmitter)	
2	Naval Communication Station Harold E. Holt, Inner Ring Masts	364	1194		Exmouth, Western Australia	21°48′47.86″S 114°10′19.56″E ; 21°49′12.14″S 114°10′18.06″E ; 21°49′23.03″S 114°09′54.71″E ; 21°49′09.69″S 114°09′32.93″E ; 21°48′45.43″S 114°9′34.51″E ; 21°48′34.53″S 114°9′57.9″E	6 guyed masts (VLF-Transmitter)	
3	Q1 Tower	323	1058	2005	Gold Coast, Queensland	28°0′22.55″S 153°25′47.1″E	Residential	
4	Australia 108	317	1039	2020	Melbourne, Victoria	37°0′49″S 144°57′50″E	Residential	
5	Sydney Tower	309	1014	1981	Sydney, New South Wales	33°52′13.67″S 151°12′32.42″E	Observation	
6	Naval Communication Station Harold E. Holt, Outer Ring Masts	304	997		Exmouth, Western Australia	21°48′24.63″S 114°10′20.31″E ; 21°49′01.16″S 114°10′39.87″E ; 21°49′35.33″S 114°10′15.87″E ; 21°49′32.92″S 114°09′32.17″E ; 21°48′56.42″S 114°09′12.74″E ; 21°48′22.25″S 114°09′36.73″E	6 guyed masts (VLF-Transmitter)	
7	Eureka Tower	297	975	2006	Melbourne, Victoria	37°49′17.68″S 144°57′52.24″E	Residential	
8	Crown Sydney	271	890	2020	Sydney, New South Wales	Barangaroo	Hotel-Casino and Residential	
9	Aurora Melbourne Central	271	887	2019	Melbourne, Victoria	37.809656°S 144.962441°E	Residential / Serviced Apartments	
10	Mount Isa Lead Smelter Stack	270	886	1978	Mount Isa, Queensland	20°43′24.02″S 139°28′56.89″E	Industrial	
11	Brisbane Skytower	270	885	2019	Brisbane, Queensland	27°28′18.16″S 153°01′43″E	Residential	
12	West Side Place Tower A	269	882	2021	Melbourne, Victoria		Hotel / Residential	
13	120 Collins Street	267	875	1991	Melbourne, Victoria	37°48′49.76″S 144°58′9.6″E	Office	
14	Ocean (building)	265	868	2022	Gold Coast, Queensland	27.9961°S 153.4297°E	Residential / Serviced Apartments	
15	Salesforce Tower (Sydney)	263	863	2022	Sydney, New South Wales	33.8619°S 151.2087°E	Office	
16	The One (Brisbane Quarter)	262	859	2021	Brisbane, Australia		Residential	
17	101 Collins Street	260	853	1991	Melbourne, Victoria	37°48′53.57″S 144°58′14.1″E	Office	
17	Loy Yang Chimney 1	260	853		Latrobe, Victoria	38°15′6.77″S 146°34′27.35″E	Industrial	
17	Loy Yang Chimney 2	260	853		Latrobe, Victoria	38°15′10.7″S 146°34′35.52″E	Industrial	
18	1 William Street	260	852	2017	Brisbane, Queensland	27°28′30.0″S 153°01′34.0″E	Office	
19	Loy Yang	255	837	1993	Latrobe, Victoria	38°15′19.54″S 146°35′9.62″E	Industrial	
20	Governor Phillip Tower	254	834	1993	Sydney, New South Wales	33°51′50.52″S 151°12′40.74″E	Office	
21	Prima Pearl	254	833	2014	Melbourne, Victoria	37°49′22.6″S 144°57′41.0″E	Residential	
21	Bourke Place	254	833	1991	Melbourne, Victoria	37°48′57.17″S 144°57′21.87″E	Office	
22	Central Park (skyscraper)	253	830	1992	Perth, Western Australia	31°57′13.2″S 115°51′20.2″E	Office	
23	Queens Place North Tower	253	829	2021	Melbourne, Victoria		Residential	
24	Rialto Towers	251	824	1986	Melbourne, Victoria	37°49′8.05″S 144°57′27.71″E	Office/Observation	
25	Chimney of Mount Piper Power Station	250	820		Lithgow, New South Wales	33°21′29.34″S 150°1′54.91″E	Industrial	
25	Chimneys of Bayswater Power Station	250	820		Hunter Region, New South Wales	32°23′36.44″S 150°56′55.3″E ; 32°23′40.49″S 150°57′5.11″E	2 chimneys	
25	Riparian Plaza (including its communications spire)	250	820	2005	Brisbane, Queensland	27°28′5.29″S 153°1′48.26″E	Office	
26	Infinity Tower	249	817	2013	Brisbane, Queensland	27°28′2.97″S 153°1′14.75″E	Residential	
27	108 St Georges Terrace	247	810	1988	Perth, Western Australia	31°57′15.39″S 115°51′23.27″E	Office	
27	One Sydney Harbour Tower 1	247	810	2024	Sydney, New South Wales	33.862647°S 151.202061°E	Residential	
27	Victoria One	247	810	2018	Melbourne, Victoria	37°48′30.1″S 144°57′38.6″E	Residential	
28	Melbourne Central	246	807	1991	Melbourne, Victoria	37°48′38.9″S 144°57′43.89″E	Office	
29	Premier Tower	246	806	2021	Melbourne, Victoria	37°49′02″S 144°57′13″E	Residential / Hotel	
30	City Square	244	808	2011	Perth, Western Australia	31°57′17.94″S 115°51′16.6″E	Office	
31	Chifley Tower	244	801	1992	Sydney, New South Wales	33°51′56.34″S 151°12′42.22″E	Office	
32	Soleil	243	797	2011	Brisbane, Queensland	27°27′44.78″S 153°1′56.98″E	Residential	
32	Citigroup Center (Sydney)	243	797	2000	Sydney, New South Wales	33°52′22.42″S 151°12′28.72″E	Office	
33	Soul	243	796	2011	Gold Coast, Queensland	28°0′4.88″S 153°25′50.25″E	Residential	
34	Deutsche Bank Place	240	787	2005	Sydney, New South Wales	33°52′0.54″S 151°12′42.61″E	Office	
34	West Side Place Tower D	239	784	2023	Melbourne, Victoria		Residential	
35	Swanston Central	237	777	2019	Melbourne, Victoria		Residential / Retail	
37	Greenland Centre, Sydney	236	773	2021	Sydney, New South Wales	33.873916°S 151.208871°E	Residential	
38	Bookfield Place (Perth)	234	769	2012	Perth, Western Australia	31°57′17.35″S 115°51′17.49″E	Office	
39	Channel 9 TV Tower	233	764		Sydney, New South Wales	33°48′41.81″S 151°11′44.83″E	Lattice Tower	
40	Shangri-La by the Gardens	232	760	2023	Melbourne, Victoria		Hotel	
41	Melbourne Square Tower 1	231	758	2021	Melbourne, Victoria		Residential	
42	World Tower	230	755	2004	Sydney, New South Wales	33°52′36.52″S 151°12′24.53″E	Residential	
42	Chimney of Callide C Power Station	230	755	2000	Banana, Queensland	24°20′39.18″S 150°37′4.97″E	Chimney	
42	West Side Place Tower C	230	755	2023	Melbourne, Victoria		Residential	
43	One Sydney Harbour Tower 2	230	754	2024	Sydney, New South Wales		Residential	
44	Vision Apartments	229	751	2016	Melbourne, Victoria	37°48′26″S 144°57′36.8″E	Residential	
45	Queen's Wharf Residences	228	749	2024	Brisbane, Queensland		Residential	
46	25 Martin Place	228	748	1977	Sydney, New South Wales	33°52′7.31″S 151°12′33.39″E	Mixed use	
47	Governor Phillip Tower	227	745	1993	Sydney, New South Wales		Office	
48	568 Collins Street	224	735	2015	Melbourne, Victoria	37°49′6.1″S 144°57′19.6″E	Mixed use	
49	Prestons ABC Mediumwave Transmitter, Large Tower	224	735		Sydney, New South Wales	33°56′31.5″S 150°53′8.01″E	Guyed mast, insulated against ground (MW-transmitter)	
49	Bourke Place	224	735	1991	Melbourne, Victoria		Office	
50	6 & 8 Parramatta Square	223	733	2022	Parramatta, New South Wales		Office	
51	Ernst & Young Tower at Latitude	222	728	2005	Sydney, New South Wales	33°52′39.15″S 151°12′23.65″E	Office	
52	380 Melbourne	221	726	2021	Melbourne, Victoria		Residential / Hotel	
53	Circle on Cavill, Tower North	220	720	2007	Gold Coast, Queensland	28°0′2.54″S 153°25′37.91″E	Residential	
54	Dalby ABC Mediumwave Transmitter	219	719		Dalby, Queensland	27°8′38.83″S 151°18′9.6″E	Guyed mast, insulated against ground (MW-transmitter)	
55	Aurora Place	219	718	2001	Sydney, New South Wales	33°51′53.46″S 151°12′42.88″E	Office	
55	Sapphire by the Gardens	219	718	2022	Melbourne, Victoria		Residential	
56	Light House Melbourne	218	715	2017	Melbourne, Victoria	37°48′30.1″S 144°57′38.6″E	Residential	
56	Telstra Corporate Centre	218	715	2001	Melbourne, Victoria	37°48′33.82″S 144°58′10.65″E	Office	
57	International Tower 1	217	712	2016	Barangaroo, New South Wales	33°51′46.56″S 151°12′5.97″E	Office	
58	Channel 7/10 TV Tower	216	709		Sydney, New South Wales	33°48′19.77″S 151°10′50.95″E	Lattice Tower	
59	Delahey ABC Mediumwave Transmitter, Large Tower	215	705		Melbourne, Victoria	37°43′13.99″S 144°47′2.58″E	Guyed mast, insulated against ground (MW-transmitter)	
60	108 St Georges Terrace	214	702	1988	Perth, Western Australia		Office	
61	Dalwallinu ABC Mediumwave Transmitter, Tower North	213	699		Dalwallinu, Western Australia	30°17′19.81″S 116°36′33.85″E	Guyed mast, insulated against ground (MW-transmitter)	
61	180 George North Tower	213	699	2023	Parramatta, New South Wales		Residential	
62	Melbourne Central Office Tower	211	692	1991	Melbourne, Victoria		Office	
63	Aspire Melbourne	211	691	2023	Melbourne, Victoria		Residential	
64	Quay Quarter Tower	210	690	2022	Sydney, New South Wales		Office	
65	UNO Melbourne	210	689	2023	Melbourne, Victoria		Residential	
65	Chimney of Tarong North Power Station	210	689	2001	Nanango, Queensland	26°46′37.78″S 151°54′51.58″E	Chimney	
65	Chimney of Stanwell Power Station	210	689	1993	Rockhampton, Queensland	23°30′32.59″S 150°19′4.27″E	Chimney	
65	Chimney of Callide B Power Station	210	689	1988	Rockhampton, Queensland	24°20′38.04″S 150°37′10.3″E	Chimney	
66	The Queensbridge Building	209	686	2025	Melbourne, Victoria		Residential / Hotel	
67	Aurora Tower	207	679	2006	Melbourne, Victoria	27°27′54.94″N 153°1′49.45″E	Residential	
67	Saint George ABC Mediumwave Transmitter	207	679		Saint George, Queensland	27°59′51.77″S 148°40′34.99″E ; 27°59′49.77″S 148°40′32″E	2 guyed masts, insulated against ground (MW-transmitter)	
68	West Side Place Tower B	206	676	2021	Melbourne, Victoria		Hotel / Residential	
69	Freshwater Place	205	673	2005	Melbourne, Victoria	37°49′19.86″S 144°57′46.52″E	Residential	
69	Chimney of Pasminco Smelter	205	673		Port Pirie, South Australia	33°10′11.76″S 138°0′41.84″E	Chimney	
69	Channel 10/0 TV Tower Mt Dandenong	205	673	2001	Mount Dandenong, Victoria	37°50′14.4″S 145°20′48.8″E	Lattice tower	
70	Eq. Tower	202	663	2017	Melbourne, Victoria	37°48′35.1″S 144°57′34.8″E	Residential	
70	Channel 10 TV Tower	202	663		Brisbane, Queensland	27°27′46.88″S 152°56′53.45″E	Lattice Tower	
71	Horsham ABC Tower	201	659		Horsham, Victoria	36°38′26.01″S 142°15′20.02″E	Guyed mast, insulated against ground (MW-transmitter)	
72	Chimney of Northern Power Station (demolished November 2018)	200	656		Port Augusta, South Australia	32°32′33″S 137°47′16.32″E	Chimney	
72	Wagin ABC Mediumwave Transmitter	200	656		Wagin, Western Australia	33°20′10.76″S 117°5′32.94″E	Guyed mast, insulated against ground (MW-transmitter)	
72	Chimneys of Eraring Power Station	200	656	1983	Lake Macquarie, New South Wales	33°3′47.2″S 151°31′16.46″E ; 33°3′40.53″S 151°31′17.67″E	2 Chimneys	

== See also ==
- List of tallest buildings in Australia
- List of tallest buildings in Oceania
