= List of tallest buildings in Australia =

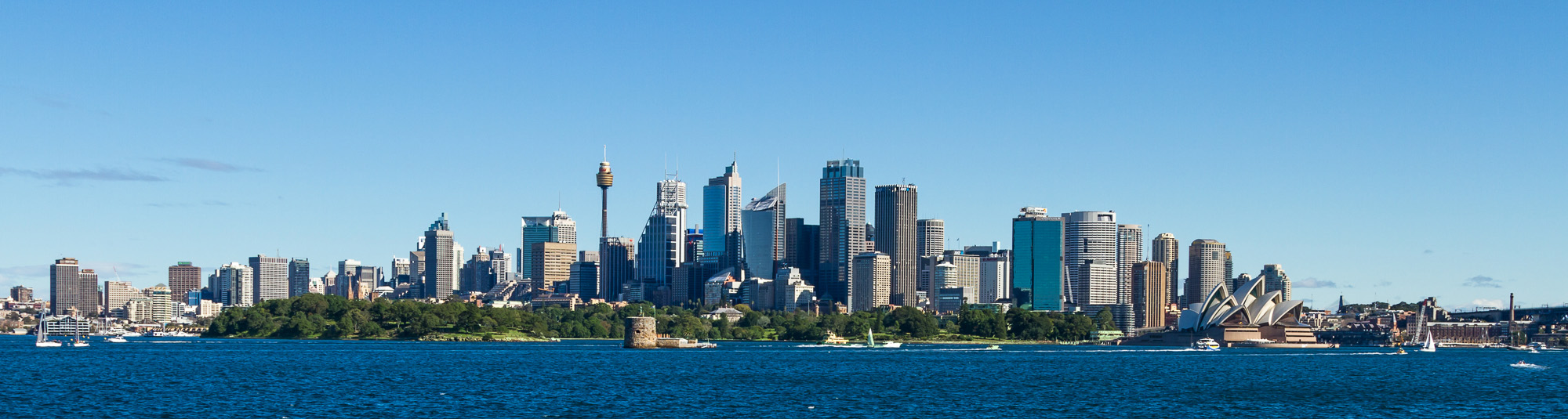
Sydney is home to the most high-rise buildings in the country.

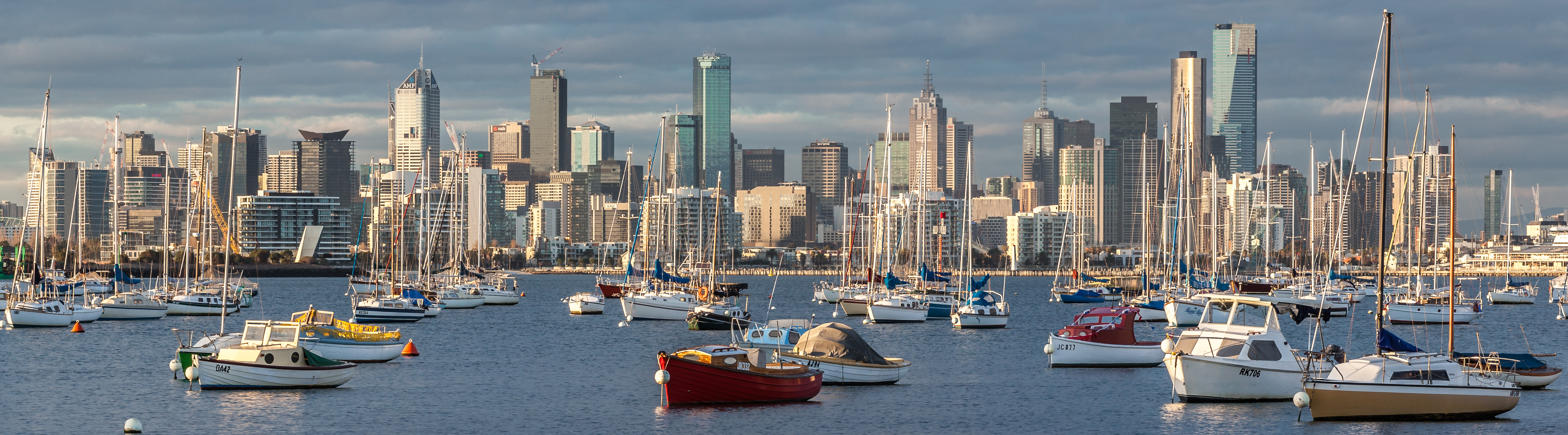
Melbourne is home to the most skyscrapers in the country with a height of over 150 metres.

Australia was one of the first countries in the world to play host to the skyscraper boom along with the United States and Canada. Australia's first skyscraper as then-defined was Melbourne's now demolished APA Building, completed in 1890, which was among the tallest buildings in the world at the time. The nation's first skyscraper as defined today by the Council on Tall Buildings and Urban Habitat as buildings exceeding 150 metres was the Australia Square Tower in Sydney, completed in 1967.

The vast majority of Australia's buildings which exceed 150 metres in height are located in the eastern states of Victoria, New South Wales, and Queensland, with a smaller number in Western Australia. While Australia's other states and territories contain no skyscrapers as defined, they all play host to numerous high-rise buildings, with South Australia having two skyscrapers under construction.

== Tallest buildings ==
This list includes the tallest completed and topped out buildings in Australia that reach a height of at least 200 metres (656.2 feet), ranked by their official heights as defined by the Council on Tall Buildings and Urban Habitat (CTBUH). An equal sign (=) following a rank indicates the same height between two or more buildings (in such cases, the building with the highest number of floors is listed first). The "Year" column indicates the year of completion. The list includes only habitable buildings, as opposed to structures such as observation towers, radio masts, transmission towers and chimneys.

Official heights (denoted by "O") are also known as "architectural heights", as they include spires but exclude communications masts and antennae. This is because spires form an integral part of a building's design while masts and antennae do not, being purely functional. Also included are heights "excluding spires" ("ES"), which as used here include the entire architectural structure save for architectural spires. Whilst this is not a measure used by CTBUH, the concept is nonetheless frequently referred to by skyscraper aficionados.

Completed in 1981, The Sydney Tower was the first structure in any Australian city to climb above 300 metres (980 ft), standing at 309 metres (1,014 ft). However, the structure is not included in this list as it does not qualify as a skyscraper due to it having only 4 floors. The bulk of the structure above the base consists of a communications and observation tower.

Was Australia's tallest building when completed

Rank	Name	Image	Location	Height: m (ft)		Floors	Year	Notes	Reference
Rank	Name	Image	Location	O	ES	Floors	Year	Notes	Reference
1	Q1		Gold Coast	322.5 (1,058)	245 (804)	78	2005	Tallest building in Australia since 2005. Tallest residential building in the world from 2005 to 2011. Q1 is short for Queensland Number One.	
2	Australia 108		Melbourne	316.7 (1,039)		100	2020	Tallest building in Melbourne since 2020. Tallest building in Australia to roof since 2020. Topped out in November 2019.	
3	Eureka Tower		Melbourne	297.3 (975)		91	2006	Tallest building in Melbourne from 2006 to 2019. Tallest building in Australia to roof from 2006 to 2019. Featuring Australia’s highest observation deck.	
4	Crown Sydney		Sydney	275 (902)		75	2020	Tallest building in Sydney. Topped out in March 2020. Completed in December 2020.	
5	Brisbane Skytower	Brisbane Skytower	Brisbane	274.3 (900)		90	2019	Tallest building in Brisbane since 2019. Largest residential building in the Southern Hemisphere since 2019 with a gross floor area of 147,000sqm. First skyscraper in Australia to be built on an equilateral triangle footprint. First building in the world to be built with a height adjustable tower crane. Tallest building completed in the 2010s.	
6	The One	The One, Brisabane	Brisbane	274 (899)		82	2021	Tallest building in the Brisbane Quarter development.	
7	Aurora Melbourne Central		Melbourne	270.5 (887)		84	2019		
8	West Side Place Tower A		Melbourne	268.7 (876)		81	2021		
9	1 William Street		Brisbane	267 (876)	224 (735)	46	2016	Tallest office building in Australia. Tallest government building in Australia. Tallest building in Brisbane from 2016 to 2019.	
10	120 Collins Street		Melbourne	265 (869)	222.15 (729)	52	1991	Tallest building in Melbourne from 1991 to 2006. Tallest building in Australia from 1991 to 2005.	
11	Ocean		Gold Coast	264.6 (868)		75	2022		
12	Salesforce Tower		Sydney	265.8 (871.1)		56	2022	Tallest commercial building in Sydney and Australia since 2022; structurally topped out in February 2022.	
13	Infinity Tower		Brisbane	262 (860)		81	2014	Tallest building in Brisbane from 2014 to 2016.	
14	101 Collins Street		Melbourne	260 (853)	195 (640)	50	1991	Tallest building in Melbourne and Australia from March to August 1991.	
15	Prima Pearl		Melbourne	254 (833)		72	2014		
16	Rialto Towers		Melbourne	251.1 (824)		63	1986	Tallest office building in Australia to roof from 1986 to 2006. Tallest building in Melbourne from 1986 to 1991. Tallest building in Australia from 1986 to 1991.	
17	Soleil		Brisbane	251 (823)		74	2012	Tallest building in Brisbane from 2012 to 2014.	
18	Queens Place Tower 1		Melbourne	249.9 (820)		79	2021		
19	Central Park		Perth	249 (817)	226 (741)	51	1992	Tallest building in Perth since 1992.	
20	One Sydney Harbour Tower 1		Sydney	247 (810)		72	2024		
21	Victoria One		Melbourne	246.8 (810)		76	2018	First proposed in 2013, construction commenced in 2014, before being completed in 2018.	
22	Premier Tower (134–160 Spencer Street)		Melbourne	245.9 m (807 ft)		78	2021	First proposed in 2014, construction commenced in 2017, before topping–out in 2020. Completed in 2021. Recognised in 7th place for the 2021 Emporis Skyscraper Award.	
=23	Brookfield Place		Perth	244 (801)		46	2011	Also known as City Square or BHP City Square	
=23	Chifley Tower		Sydney	244 (801)	216 (709)	53	1992	Tallest building in Sydney from 1992 to 2019.	
24	Citigroup Centre		Sydney	243 (797)	206 (676)	50	2000		
25	Soul		Gold Coast	242.6 (796)		77	2012		
26	Queen's Wharf Residences		Brisbane	242 (794)		63	2024	Second tallest building in the Queen's Wharf development	
27	Deutsche Bank Place		Sydney	240 (787)	160 (525)	39	2005	Shortest building to roof of top 30.	
28	West Side Place Tower D (250 Spencer Street)		Melbourne	239 m (784 ft)		72	2023	First proposed in 2013, construction commenced in 2020, before topping–out in 2022. Second–tallest building of the West Side Place complex.	
29	Greenland Centre		Sydney	237 (778)		67	2020	Topped out in July 2020. Scheduled for completion in late 2020. Tallest residential building in Sydney upon completion.	
30	Swanston Central		Melbourne	236.7 (777)		78	2019		
31	Shangri-La by the Gardens (308 Exhibition Street)		Melbourne	231.7 m (760 ft)		59	2023	First proposed in 2016, construction commenced in 2019, before topping-out in 2022. Upon completion in 2023, it will become the tallest all-hotel building in Australia, surpassing the Jewel Hotel on the Gold Coast. Taller tower of the by the Gardens development.	
32	Melbourne Square Tower 1 (93–119 Kavanagh Street)		Melbourne	231 m (758 ft)		70	2021	First proposed in 2017, construction commenced in 2018, before topping–out in 2020. Completed in 2021. Tallest building of the Melbourne Square complex.	
=33	World Tower		Sydney	230 (755)		73	2004	Won the bronze Emporis Skyscraper Award in 2004	
=33	West Side Place Tower C (250 Spencer Street)		Melbourne	230 m (755 ft)		70	2023	First proposed in 2013, construction commenced in 2020, before topping–out in 2022. 3rd–tallest building of the West Side Place complex.	
=33	One Sydney Harbour Tower 2		Sydney	230 (755)		68	2024		
36	Vision Apartments		Melbourne	229 (751)		70	2016		
37	25 Martin Place		Sydney	228 (748)		60	1977	Tallest building in Australia from 1977 to 1986.	
38	Governor Phillip Tower		Sydney	227 (745)		54	1993	Incorporates the site of Australia's first Government House.	
39	6 & 8 Parramatta Square		Sydney	225.45 (739.66)		57	2022	Tallest building in Parramatta. Topped out in November 2021.	
=40	568 Collins Street		Melbourne	224 (735)		68	2015		
=42	Bourke Place		Melbourne	224 (735)		49	1991	A 30 m communications mast sits atop the building.	
43	Latitude		Sydney	222 (728)	192 (630)	45	2004		
44	Circle on Cavill North Tower		Gold Coast	219.5 (720)		70	2007		
45	Aurora Place		Sydney	218.9 (718)	188 (617)	41	2001		
46	Sapphire by the Gardens (308 Exhibition Street)		Melbourne	218.8 m (718 ft)		57	2022	First proposed in 2016, construction commenced in 2019, before completion in 2022. Shorter tower of the by the Gardens development	
=47	Light House Melbourne		Melbourne	218 (715)		69	2018		
=47	Telstra Corporate Centre		Melbourne	218 (715)	193 (633)	47	1992		
49	380 Melbourne (380 Lonsdale Street)		Melbourne	217.5 m (714 ft)		67	2021	First proposed in 2014, construction commenced in 2018, before topping–out in 2020. Completed in 2021.	
50	International Towers 1		Sydney	217 (711)		49	2016		
51	108 St Georges Terrace		Perth	214 (702)		50	1988	A 33 m communications mast sits atop the building.	
52	180 George Street – North Tower		Sydney	213 (699)		67	2023	In Parramatta CBD.	
53	Quay Quarter Tower		Sydney	212.92 (698.5)		52	1976/2022	Best Tall Building Worldwide 2023 Winner, 2023 CTBUH Awards.	
=54	West Side Place Tower B		Melbourne	211 (692)		65	2021		
=54	The Tower at Melbourne Central		Melbourne	211 (692)		54	1991	Part of a major shopping, office and public transport hub in Melbourne.	
56	Aspire Melbourne (299 King Street)		Melbourne	210.6 m (691 ft)		65	2023	First proposed in 2014, construction commenced in 2020, before topping–out in 2022.	
57	UNO Melbourne (111 A'Beckett Street)		Melbourne	210 m (689 ft)		65	2023	First proposed in 2015, construction began in 2020.	
=58	Aurora		Brisbane	207 (679)		69	2006	Tallest building in Brisbane from 2006 to 2012.	
=58	Freshwater Place		Melbourne	205 (673)		63	2005	The residential part of an office/residential building complex.	
60	Eq. Tower		Melbourne	202.7 (665)		63	2017		
61	Riparian Plaza		Brisbane	200 (656)		53	2005	Tallest building in Brisbane from 2005 to 2006. A 50 m communications mast stands atop the building.	

== Tallest buildings under construction, approved or on hold ==
This list includes the tallest buildings at or above 200 metres (660 ft) that are currently under construction, on hold or approved in Australia according to the CVU, save for those which have already topped out.

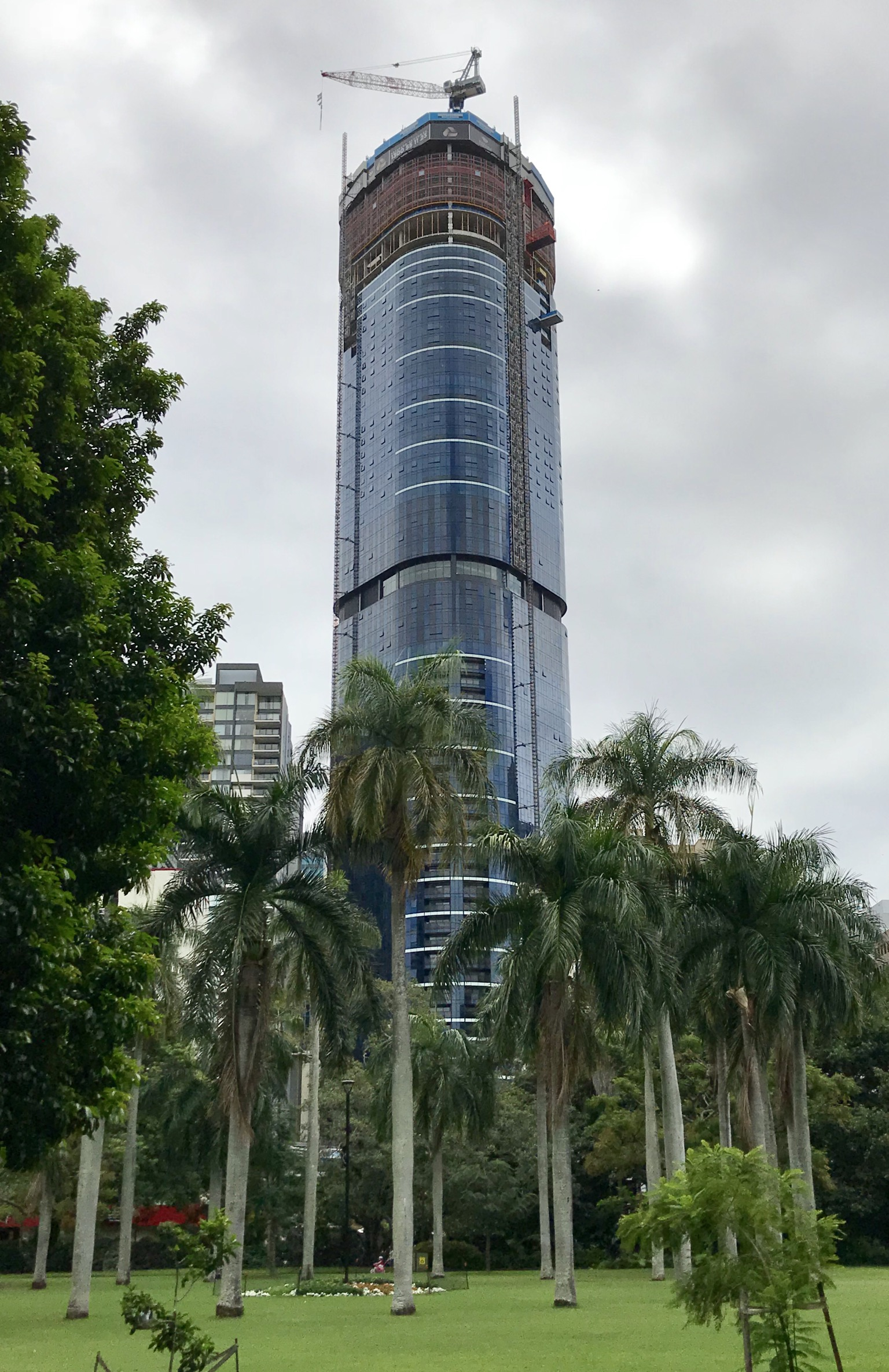
Brisbane Skytower under construction in March 2018. The project was completed in 2019.

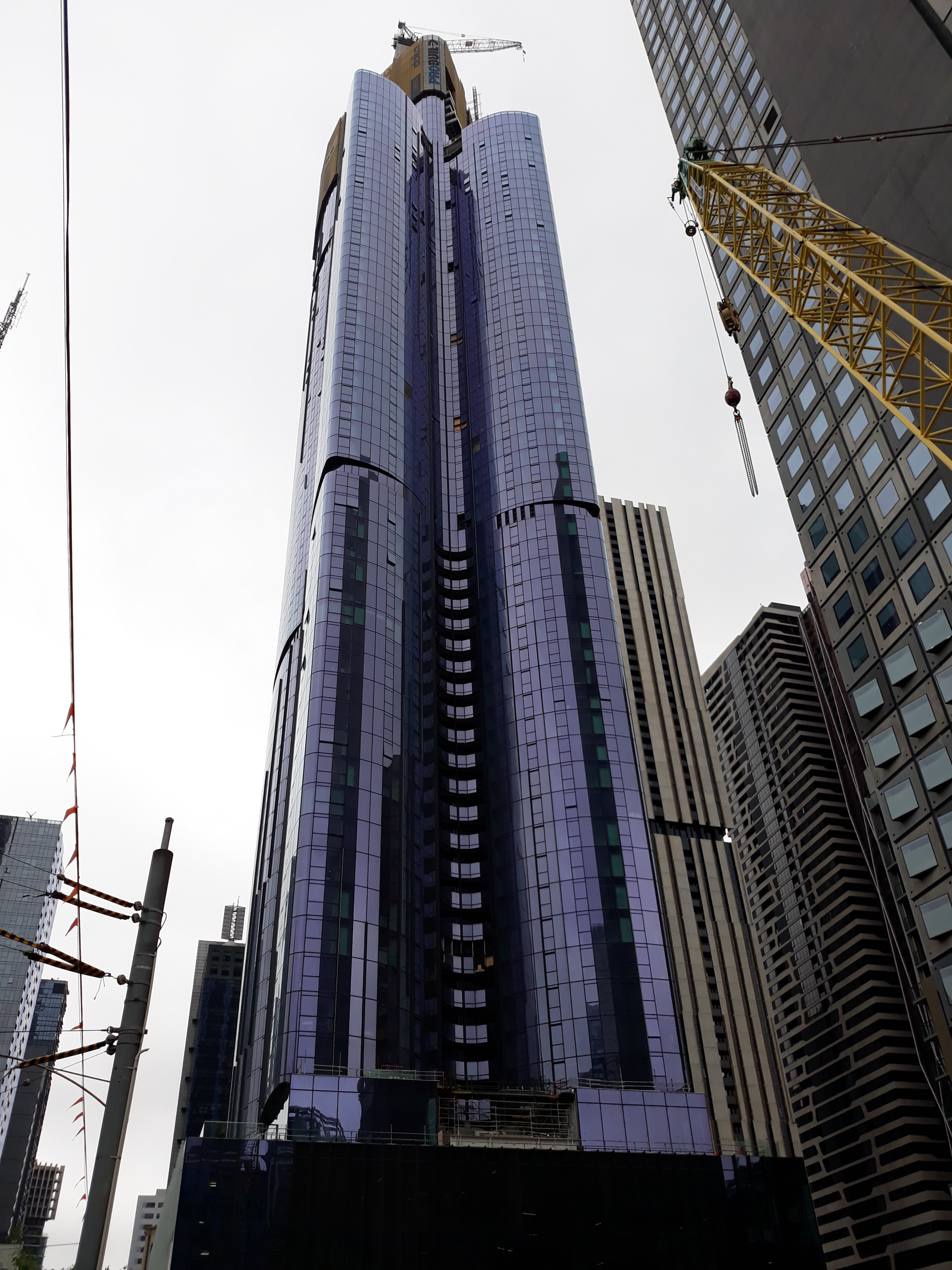
Aurora Melbourne Central under construction in November 2018. The project was completed in 2019.

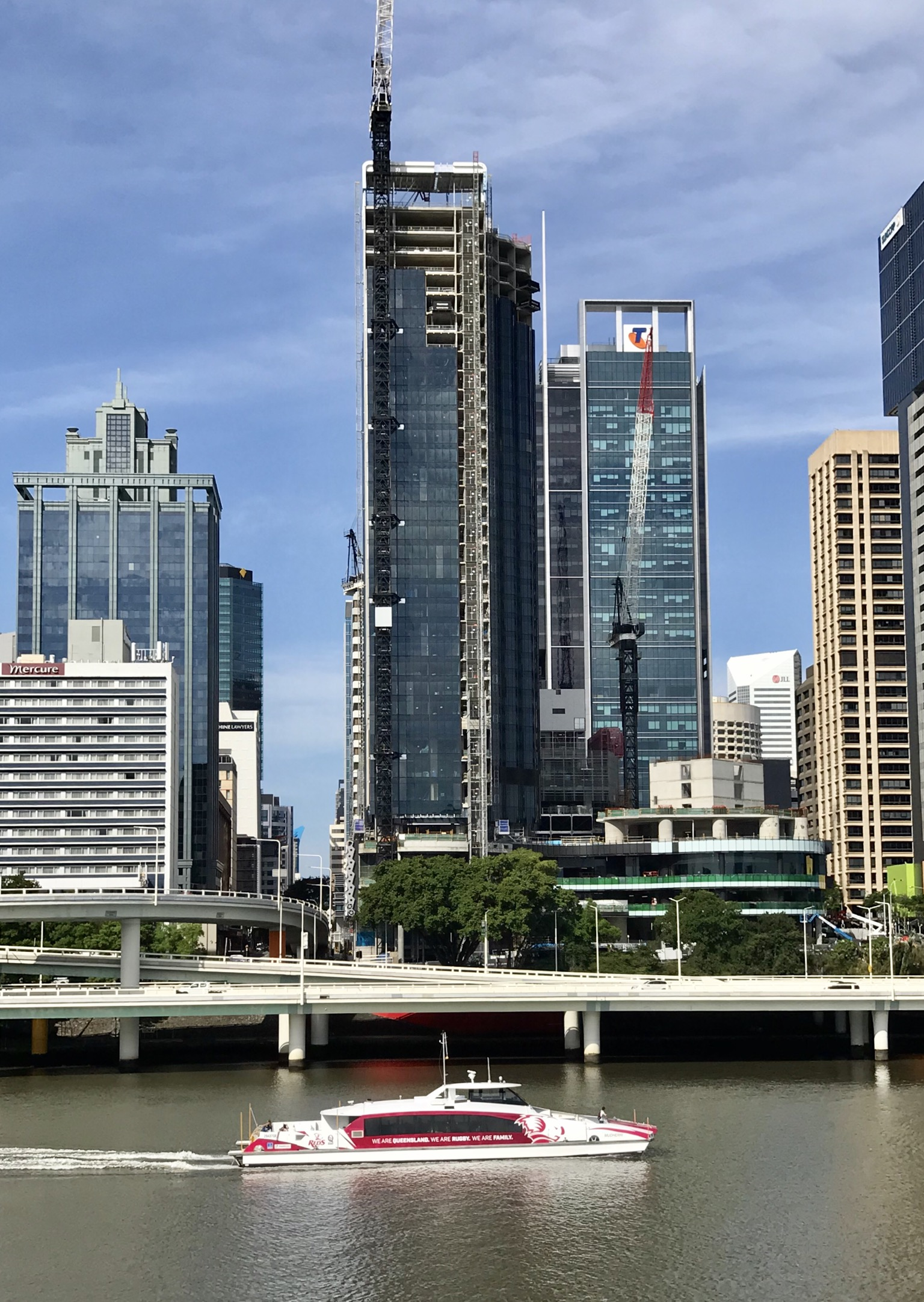
Brisbane Quarter under construction in January 2018. The project was completed in 2019.

Status:
Under construction	Approved	Topped out

Name	Height		Storeys	Purpose	City	Completion	Status
Name	m	ft	Storeys	Purpose	City	Completion	Status
Cypress Palms Tower 1	305.2	1,001	90	Residential	Gold Coast	2027	Under Construction
25–35 Power Street	280.3	920	71	Mixed use	Melbourne	TBA	Approved
The Oscar Tower A	273.5	897	79	Residential	Brisbane	2027	Under Construction
30 Albert Street	270	890	91	Residential	Brisbane	TBA	Approved
505 George Street	270	890	80	Residential	Sydney	TBA	Approved
338 Pitt Street Tower 1	267	876	82	Mixed use	Sydney	TBA	Approved
338 Pitt Street Tower 2	267	876	82	Mixed use	Sydney	TBA	Approved
Cypress Palms Tower 2	261.6	858	76	Residential	Gold Coast	2027	Under Construction
25 Mary Street	254.1	834	71	Residential	Brisbane	TBA	Approved
Queen's Wharf Tower 5	253	830	71	Residental	Brisbane	2026	Under Construction
Queens Place Tower 2	251	823	79	Residential	Melbourne	TBA	Approved
St Andrews Place	249.5	819	62	Residential	Perth	TBA	Approved
The Oscar Tower M	244.2	801	70	Residential	Brisbane	2027	Under Construction
Iconica	243	74	78	Residential	Gold Coast	2026	Under Construction
Brisbane Waterfront North Tower	238	781	49	Office	Brisbane	2026	Under Construction
55 Pitt Street	238	781	56	Office	Sydney	TBA	Under construction
Monument	234	768	68	Residential	Melbourne	TBA	Approved
51–65 Clarke Street	234	768	73	Residential	Melbourne	TBA	Approved
Victoria & Albert	218	715	64	Residential	Gold Coast	2026	Under Construction
309 North Quay Tower 1	213.1	699	56	Residential	Brisbane	TBA	Approved
Lot 4 EQ	212.4	696	54	Mixed Use	Perth	2027	Under construction
Briabane Waterfront South Tower	212	696	43	Office	Brisbane	2026	Under Construction
435 Bourke Street	210.3	690	49	Office	Melbourne	2026	Approved
272 Queen Street	210	690	62	Mixed use	Melbourne	TBA	Approved
164 Melbourne Street	207	679	50	Residential	Brisbane	2027	Under Construction
280 Queen Street	207	679	68	Residential	Melbourne	TBA	Approved
112 Talavera Road – Building B	200	660	63	Residential	Sydney	TBA	Approved

== Tallest buildings by state or territory ==
The following table provides the tallest building (completed or topped out) in each state given that only New South Wales, Queensland, Victoria, and Western Australia are currently featured in the lists of tallest buildings to architectural detail and to roof. Heights to architectural detail are used.

Current
State / Territory	Building	Height	Floor count	Year
Queensland	Q1	323 m (1059.7 ft)	78	2005
Victoria	Australia 108	316.7 m (1039 ft)	100	2020
New South Wales	Crown Sydney	271 m (889.1 ft)	75	2020
Western Australia	Central Park	249 m (816.9 ft)	52	1992
South Australia	Frome Central Tower One	138 m (453.0 ft)	37	2020
Australian Capital Territory	High Society Tower One	113 m (370.7 ft)	27	2020
Northern Territory	Evolution on Gardiner	99 m (324.8 ft)	33	2008
Tasmania	Wrest Point Hotel Casino	73 m (239.5 ft)	19	1973

The following table lists future tallest buildings that if built, could become the tallest buildings in their respective state or territory.

Future
State / Territory	Building	Height	Floor count	Status	Year
New South Wales	56 Pitt Street	305 m (1,001 ft)	75	Proposed	N/A
Western Australia	St Andrews Place	249 m (819 ft)	62	Proposed	N/A
South Australia	Keystone Tower	183 m (600.4 ft)	39	Under construction	2028

== Cities with the most skyscrapers ==
This table shows Australian cities with at least one skyscraper over 150 metres in height, completed, topped-out or under construction.

Rank	City	State	150 m+ (492.1 ft+)	200 m+ (656.1 ft+)	250 m+ (820.2 ft+)	300 m+ (984.2 ft+)	Total
1	Melbourne	Victoria	85	34	9	1	85^{[N1]}
2	Sydney	New South Wales	80	22	4	–	80^{[N2]}
3	Brisbane	Queensland	30	10	6	–	30^{[N3]}
4	Gold Coast	Queensland	16	7	3	1	16^{[N4]}
5	Perth	Western Australia	6	4	–	–	6^{[N5]}
6	Adelaide	South Australia	2	_	_	_	2^{[N6]}

Notes

- N1. Of a total 85 skyscrapers, 7 are under construction or have topped-out
- N2. Of a total 80 skyscrapers, 22 are under construction or have topped-out
- N3. Of a total 22 skyscrapers, 5 are under construction or have topped-out
- N4. Of a total 16 skyscrapers, 5 are under construction or have topped-out
- N5. Of a total 6 skyscrapers, 2 are under construction or have topped-out
- N6. Of a total 2 skyscrapers, 2 are under construction or have topped-out

A cumulative line graph of skyscrapers by Australian city (completed and under construction), as of February 2025. Data is according to the Council on Vertical Urbanism.

== See also ==
- List of tallest buildings in the Southern Hemisphere
- List of tallest structures in Australia
- List of tallest buildings in Oceania
- List of cities in Australia with the most skyscrapers
