= Chifley Tower =

Skyscraper in Sydney, New South Wales, Australia

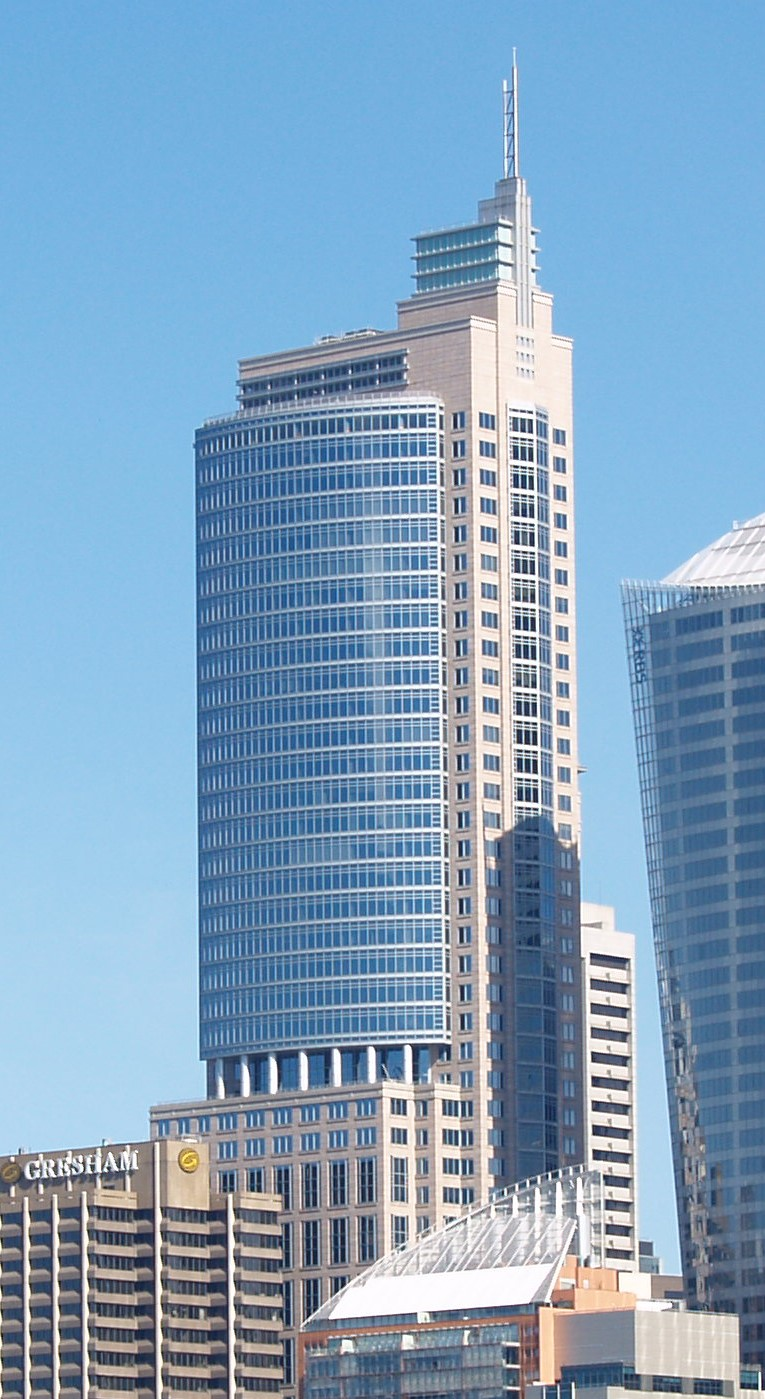
- Chifley Tower in August 2010
- Interactive map of the Chifley Tower area

Record height
- Tallest in Sydney from 1992 to 2019^{[I]}
- Preceded by: Citigroup Centre
- Surpassed by: Crown Sydney

General information
- Status: Completed
- Type: Office
- Location: Sydney, New South Wales, Australia
- Coordinates: 33°51′57.4″S 151°12′41.9″E
- Construction started: 1988
- Completed: 1992
- Cost: A$ 1.2 billion

Height
- Antenna spire: 244 m (801 ft)
- Roof: 216 m (709 ft)

Technical details
- Floor count: 53
- Floor area: 90,000 m^{2} (968,800 sq ft)
- Lifts/elevators: 29

Design and construction
- Architect: Kohn Pedersen Fox
- Developer: Bond Corporation & Kumagai Gumi

Website
- www.chifley.com.au

Chifley Tower is a 53-storey skyscraper in Sydney, New South Wales, Australia. It was designed by New York City-based architects Travis McEwen and Kohn Pedersen Fox, with John Rayner as project architect. At a height of 244 metres (801 feet), Chifley Tower was the tallest building in Sydney from 1992 to 2019. It was surpassed in height by Crown Sydney (271 metres) in 2020 along with the Salesforce Tower (263 metres) and One Sydney Harbour (247 metres) in 2022.

== Site history ==
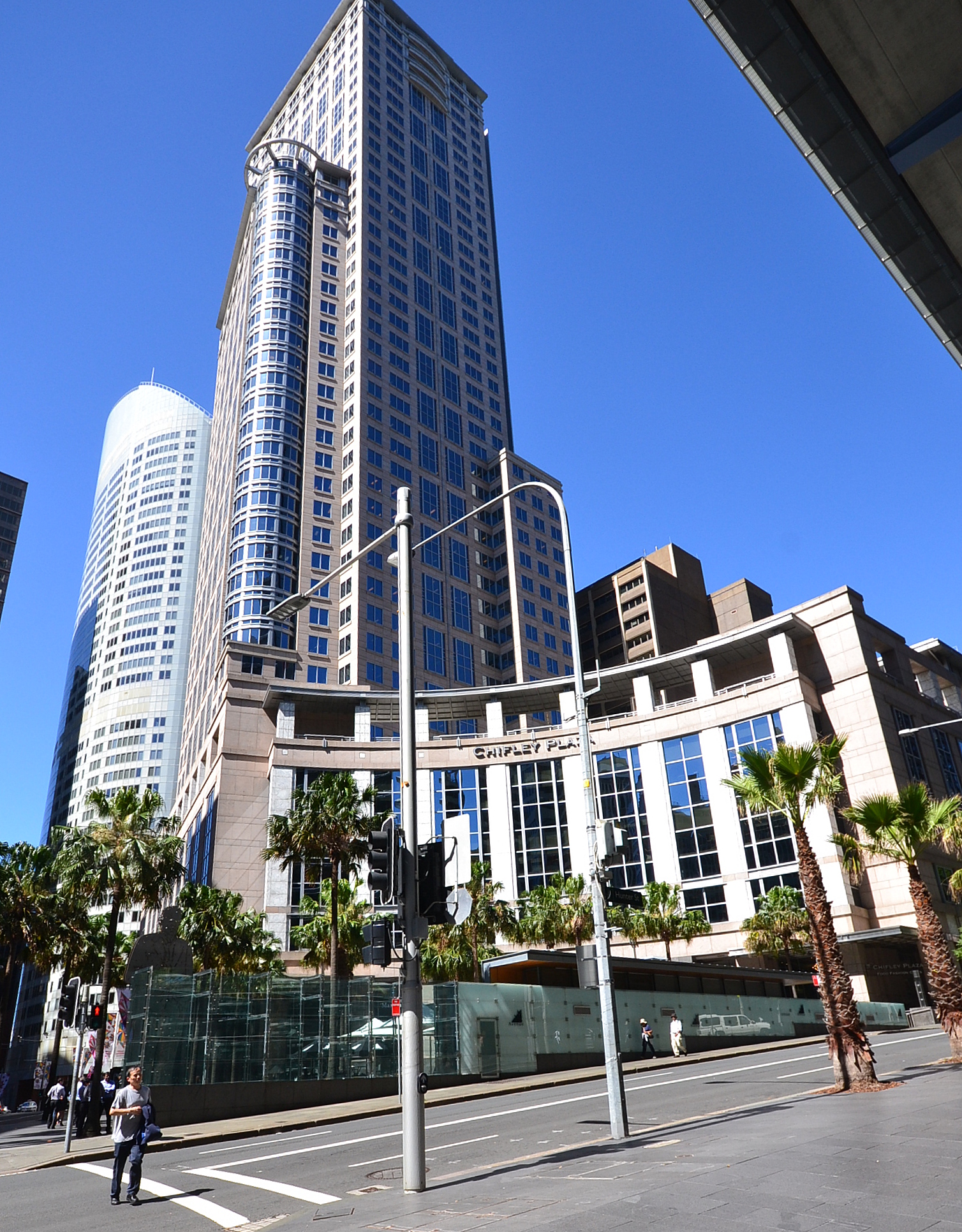
Tower from the south with ground plaza at street level

Chifley Tower is built on an irregularly shaped plot. Due to the organic development of Sydney's street pattern, the streets that run north from this area form a skewed grid that is aligned differently to the streets that run south from this area, which form another skewed grid. The cross streets immediately north and south of the site (Bent and Hunter), on the other hand, follow meandering alignments that do not align with these skewed grids.

At the southwestern corner of the plot, Elizabeth Street terminates at Hunter Street while, a short distance to the east, Phillip Street crosses Hunter Street and continues north to Circular Quay. Elizabeth Street became a major artery, running almost straight from Hunter Street in the north, past Central station through to Waterloo, while Phillip Street runs south from this junction for only two blocks before it is terminated by King Street and St James' Church. As a result, termination of Elizabeth Street at Hunter Street was felt to be unsatisfactory, and from the early 20th century various plans were devised to modernise this junction. The City of Sydney Council adopted a plan to create a Parisian Haussmannian-style geometric plaza, through which Elizabeth Street would connect with the northern section of Phillip Street and form a thoroughfare to Circular Quay.

Land resumptions to create this square continued for many years. In 1957, Qantas House was completed to the northwest of the junction, with a curved frontage conforming to the planned plaza, named Chifley Square. However, in 1962, the Commonwealth Centre, owned by the Federal Government, was completed on the site of today's Chifley Tower complex, and did not align with the planned plaza. Eventually it was demolished in the 1980s, and the Chifley Tower complex was built in its place. The podium building has a curved facade to the southwest which mirrors that of Qantas House and completes the semicircular curve of the planned square. The southwestern corner of the plot became a pedestrian plaza, with a giant, two-dimensional sculpture of Ben Chifley, after whom the square is named.

The building was originally named Bond Tower, after Alan Bond. After Bond's bankruptcy, the building was acquired by Kumagai Gumi, and in 1993 was renamed Chifley Tower, after the square. The retail arcade located in the podium building is named Chifley Plaza.

== Features ==
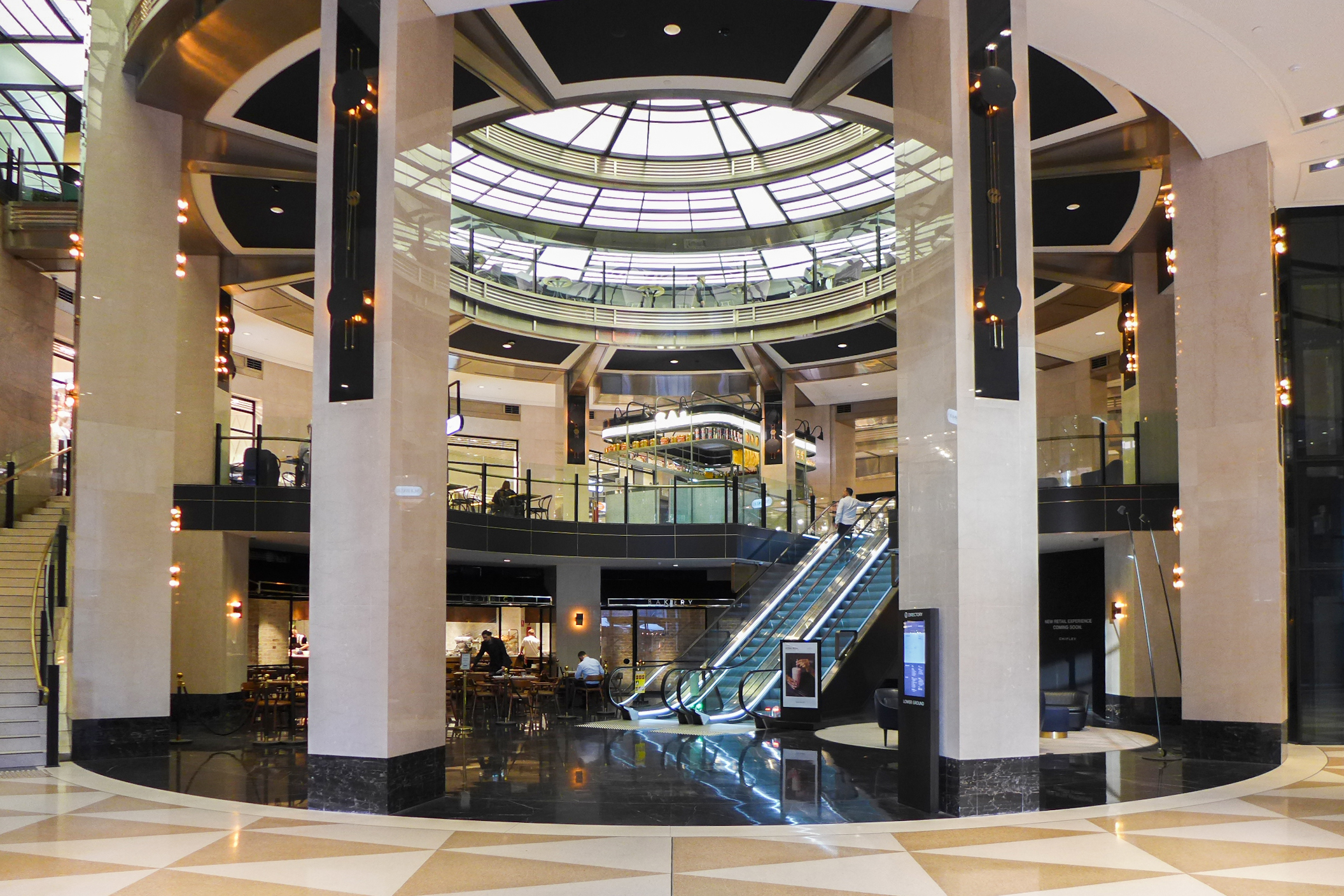
Arcade Entrance

Located at 2 Chifley Square, its cross streets are Hunter, Philip and Bent Streets with the main entry being on Phillip Street. Due to its prominent location at the peak in the north-east CBD, the Tower has broad harbour views from its 42 storeys. The tower is used primarily for commercial use, mostly financial institutions, law firms and corporations. Current tenants include UBS, BlackRock, Servcorp, Hana Financial Group and Bank of Queensland.

A midrise podium building surrounds the tower. Retail arcades are located on the lower levels, while the upper levels of the podium building are used as commercial offices (for most of the building's history, as trading floors for a succession of investment banks). The entrance foyer for the retail arcades is located on the southwestern corner of the building, facing Chifley Square.

A 3-metre (9.8 ft) lightning rod was added in 2000, extending its original height from 241 metres (791 ft) to 244 metres (801 ft). To stop the tower from moving in the wind a giant steel pendulum weighing 400 long tons (450 short tons) is held from eight 75-millimetre (3.0 in) wires near the rooftop. The tower is named after former Australian Prime Minister Ben Chifley.

At one time All Nippon Airways operated a sales office on Level 32.

== See also ==
- List of tallest buildings in Sydney
- List of tallest buildings in Australia
- List of tallest buildings designed by Kohn Pedersen Fox
