= Salesforce Tower (disambiguation) =

Salesforce Tower is a building in San Francisco, United States.

Salesforce Tower may refer to one of many buildings named for and primarily operated by the American technology company Salesforce:

- Salesforce Tower Atlanta, Atlanta, United States
- Salesforce Tower Chicago, Chicago, United States
- Salesforce Tower (Indianapolis) in Indianapolis, United States
- Salesforce Tower London in London, United Kingdom
- 1095 Avenue of the Americas, renamed Salesforce Tower, in New York City, United States
- Salesforce Tower (Sydney) in Sydney, Australia
