= Melbourne Central Tower =

Skyscraper in Melbourne Australia

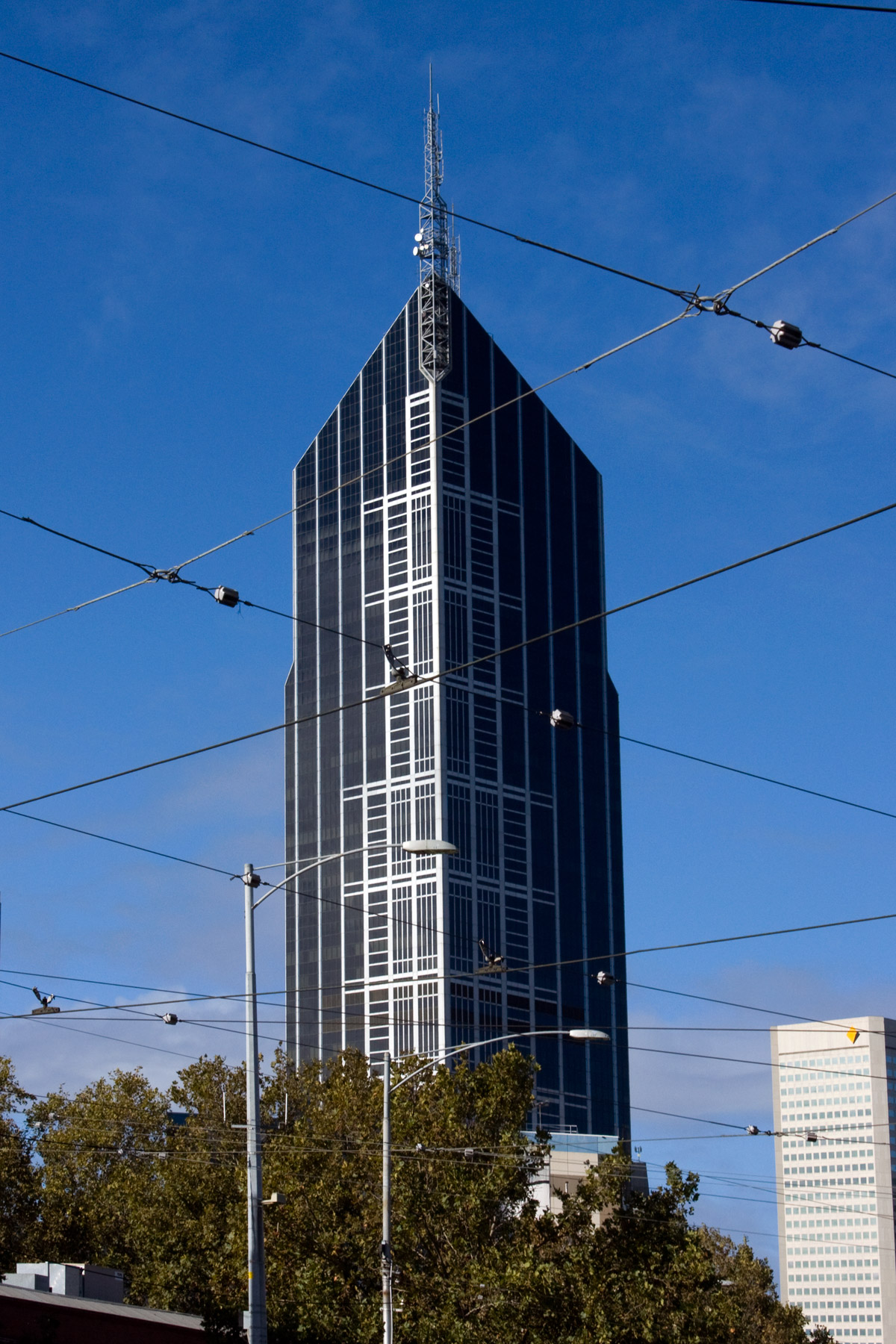

General information
- Type: Office
- Location: Elizabeth Street, Melbourne CBD, Victoria, Australia
- Coordinates: 37°48′39″S 144°57′43″E

Height
- Antenna spire: 246 m (807 ft)
- Roof: 210 m (690 ft)

Technical details
- Floor count: 57
- Floor area: 65,800 m^{2} (708,300 sq ft)

Design and construction
- Architect: Hassel with Kisho Kurokawa

The Melbourne Central Tower is an office skyscraper on top of Melbourne Central Shopping Centre in Melbourne, Australia. Standing at 210 metres (690 ft) with 57 storeys with 51 of which are for office use.

Currently it is occupied by ME Bank replacing space previously tenanted by BP and Telstra. Several Australian and Victorian Government departments and agencies maintain spaces in the tower including Creative Australia, the Department of Infrastructure, Transport, Regional Development, Communications and the Arts and the Victorian Energy & Water Ombudsman. Other tenants include Wilson Parking, Nordex and Pacific Basin Shipping Limited The tower is owned by GPT Wholesale Office Fund and the tower structure is approximately 210 metres (690 ft) tall. Including the two 54-metre (177 ft) communications masts that extend a further 35 metres (115 ft) above the apex, the tower is 246 metres (807 ft) tall.

List of tallest buildings in Australia
| Next Shortest Chifley Tower; 244 metres (801 ft) | Next Tallest Central Park; 249 metres (817 ft) |
Heights are to highest architectural element.

List of tallest buildings in Melbourne
| Next Shortest Telstra Corporate Centre; 219 metres (719 ft) | Next Tallest Rialto Towers; 251 metres (823 ft) |
Heights are to highest architectural element.
