= List of cities in Australia with the most skyscrapers =

Australia has over 200 skyscrapers – buildings which reach or exceed heights of 150 metres (490 ft) – complete or under construction, all spread throughout five cities of the country. Most skyscrapers are located in cities within the Eastern states of Australia, and a number of these cities, such as Melbourne and Sydney, also rank high in the world list of cities with the most skyscrapers.

== Cities by number of skyscrapers ==
Five cities in Australia currently host at least one skyscraper – all of which are state capitals, with the exception of the Gold Coast, a city in the state of Queensland. Of Australian cities which comprise skyscrapers, Sydney constructed the first skyscraper in the country in 1967, followed by Melbourne in 1972, Brisbane and Perth in 1988, and most recently, the Gold Coast in 2004. Most skyscrapers in Australia are concentrated in the Eastern states (Queensland, New South Wales, and Victoria), whilst a smaller number are located in the Western Australia state capital, Perth. The cities with the highest number of skyscrapers have traditionally been either Sydney or Melbourne since the 1970s. The only other capital cities in Australia to not feature any skyscrapers whatsoever are Adelaide in South Australia, Hobart in Tasmania, Darwin in the Northern Territory, and Australia's capital, Canberra in the Australian Capital Territory.

A cumulative line graph of the over 150 skyscrapers in Australia by city (completed and under construction), as of June 2024. Data is according to the Council on Tall Buildings and Urban Habitat.

Rank	City	State	Image	No. of skyscrapers			
Rank	City	State	Image	C (Note: Completed)	TO (Note: Topped out)	UC (Note: Under construction)	T (Note: Total)
1	Melbourne	Victoria		79	0	6	85
2	Sydney	New South Wales		59	4	17	80
3	Brisbane	Queensland		23	0	7	30
4	Gold Coast	Queensland		12	0	6	18
5	Perth	Western Australia		4	1	0	5

== City precincts by number of skyscrapers ==
This is a list of all the city precincts in Australia with skyscrapers 150 metres (490 ft) or greater in height. Included in this table are precincts with no existing skyscrapers, but that have at least one skyscraper under construction or topped-out; these precincts are not ranked.

Rank	Precinct	City	State	Image	No. of skyscrapers				Year of first skyscraper
Rank	Precinct	City	State	Image	C	TO	UC	T	Year of first skyscraper
1	CBD	Melbourne	Victoria		58	0	2	60	1972
2	CBD	Sydney	New South Wales		31	1	6	38	1967
3	CBD	Brisbane	Queensland		23	0	6	29	1988
4	Southbank	Melbourne	Victoria		15	1	2	18	1997
5	Parramatta	Sydney	New South Wales		9	0	2	11	2017
6	Surfers Paradise	Gold Coast	Queensland		7	0	1	8	2004
7	Barangaroo	Sydney	New South Wales		6	0	0	6	2015
=8	CBD	Perth	Western Australia		4	0	1	5	1988
=8	North Sydney	Sydney	New South Wales		5	0	0	5	2019
10	Chatswood	Sydney	New South Wales		2	0	3	5	2014
=11	The Rocks	Sydney	New South Wales		2	0	0	2	1988
=11	Haymarket	Sydney	New South Wales		2	0	0	2	1992
=13	Broadbeach	Gold Coast	Queensland		1	0	1	2	2005
=13	St Leonards	Sydney	New South Wales		1	0	1	2	—
=15	Southport	Gold Coast	Queensland		1	0	0	1	2016
=15	St Kilda Road	Melbourne	Victoria		1	0	0	1	2005
=15	Carlton	Melbourne	Victoria		1	0	0	1	2019
=15	South Yarra	Melbourne	Victoria		1	0	0	1	2019
=15	South Bank	Brisbane	Queensland		0	0	1	1	2027

Abbreviations

== See also ==
- List of tallest buildings in Australia
- List of tallest structures in Australia
- List of tallest buildings in Oceania
- List of cities with the most skyscrapers
