= Bourke Place =

Skyscraper in Melbourne, Victoria, Australia

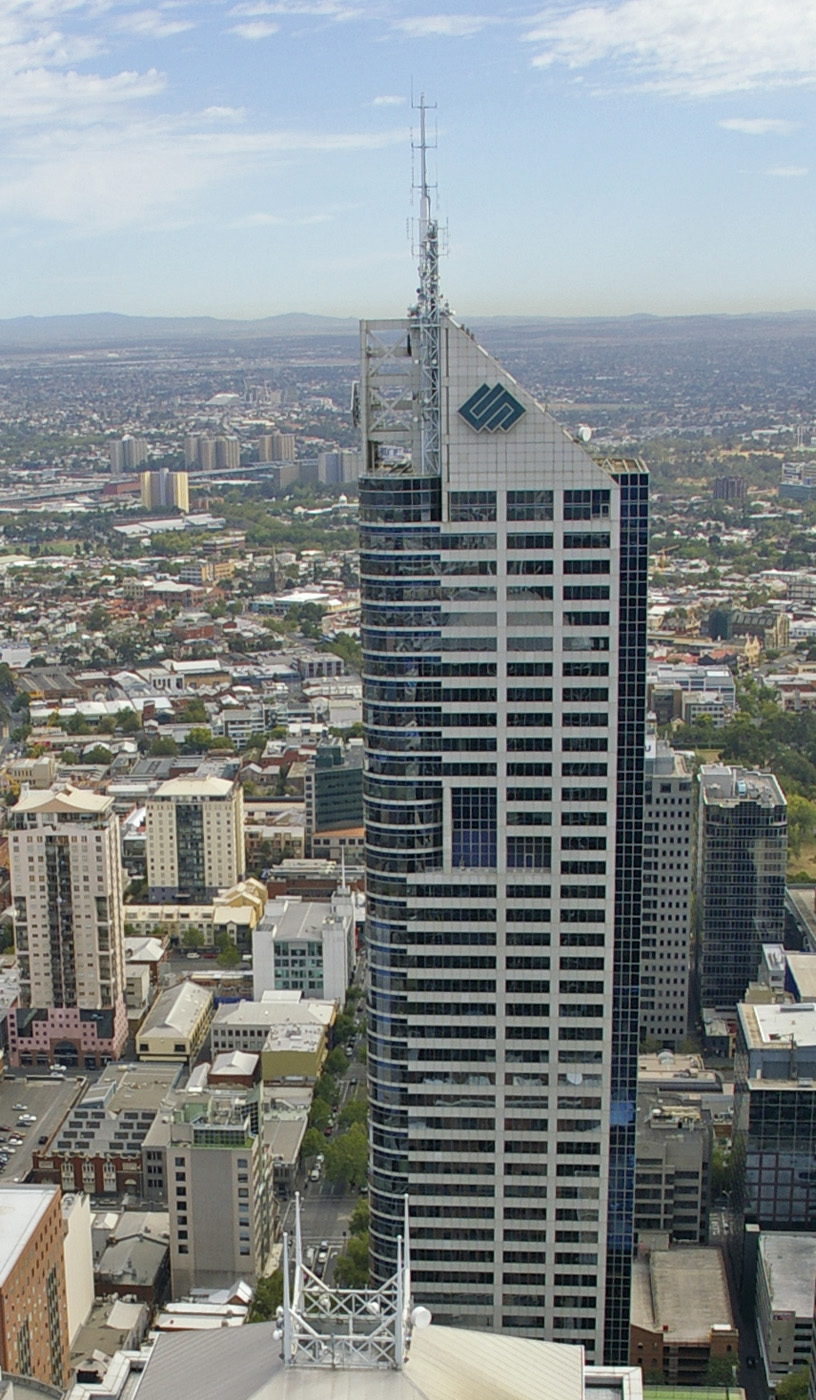

- Location within Melbourne

General information
- Status: Completed
- Type: Office
- Location: Bourke Street, Melbourne CBD, Victoria
- Coordinates: 37°48′57.37″S 144°57′21.56″E
- Construction started: 1990
- Completed: 1991
- Owner: AMP Capital

Height
- Antenna spire: 254 metres (833 ft)
- Roof: 224 metres (735 ft)

Technical details
- Floor count: 51

Design and construction
- Architect: Godfrey & Spowers
- Services engineer: Norman Disney & Young

Bourke Place is a 224-metre (735 ft) skyscraper situated at 600 Bourke Street, Melbourne central business district, Victoria, Australia. As of 2026, it is the equal 18th tallest building in Melbourne and the 40th tallest building in Australia. It was completed in 1991.

Designed by the architectural firm Godfrey & Spowers, it is a modernist building. It previously served as the headquarters for BHP, and the company's sign on the outside of the structure was the highest in the country. BHP has since moved to a new building across the city to 171 Collins Street.

The building's most obvious feature on the skyline is its sloped roof, which hides various communications equipment. The structure's facade is 170,000 square metres (1,800,000 sq ft) of laminated glass.

In 2019, the building's ground floor foyer underwent refurbishment under the guidance of 3XN in collaboration with NH Architecture, with construction work carried out by Probuild.

Bourke Place is home to numerous law firms, including Dentons, King & Wood Mallesons, Barry Nilsson, HFW, Sparke Helmore Lawyers, Gadens, and Lander & Rogers. Other tenants include Zurich Insurance Group, M&K Lawyers, Berkshire Hathaway, Scottish Pacific and Interpro.

== See also ==
- Australian landmarks
- List of tallest buildings in Melbourne
- List of tallest buildings in Australia
