= Vision Apartments =

Residential skyscraper built in Melbourne, Victoria, Australia

Coordinates: 37.8072°S 144.9603°E

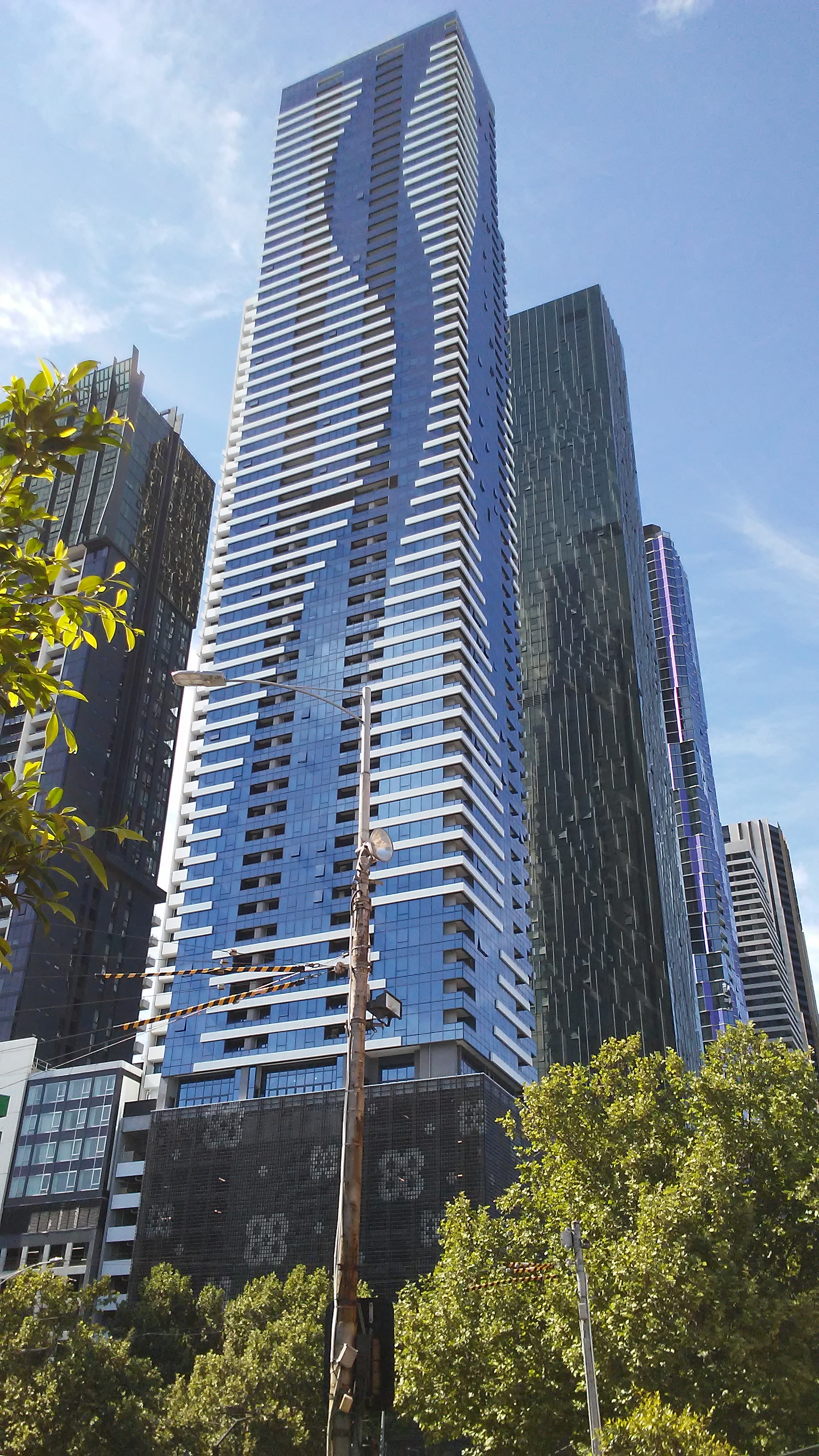
- Vision apartments in 2018

General information
- Status: Completed
- Location: 500 Elizabeth Street, Melbourne, Victoria (Australia)
- Groundbreaking: 2011
- Opening: 2016
- Cost: A$400–500 million

Height
- Roof: 229 m (751 ft)

Technical details
- Floor count: 70

Design and construction
- Developer: The Brady Group

Vision Apartments is a residential skyscraper built in Melbourne, Victoria, Australia. As of 2026, the skyscraper is the 17th–tallest building in Melbourne and 36th-tallest building in Australia.

== History ==
By early 2009, the Brady Group were proposing to build a residential skyscraper on a site adjacent to the Queen Victoria Market car park. The 1,030 m^{2} site, which previously hosted a 150–year–old hotel, was bought at an auction for {{AUD11.8 million by the property developer, in 2008. After minor changes to design, The Brady Group officially re–launched the project in 2011, wherein plans were tabled for a residential skyscraper which would reach 223 metres (732 feet) in height. The proposal included more than 500 residential apartments spanning across 69 levels, in addition to three basement levels.

Approval for the project was granted in November 2012, by the then–Planning Minister, Matthew Guy. Construction on the $400–500 million project commenced in October 2013, whereby a completion date was estimated for some time in mid–2016. During construction, the Melbourne City Council discovered that two of three basement car-park levels had not been constructed, despite being present within the 2011 plans for the project; nevertheless, the developer had submitted minor planning amendments to Minister Guy, as to reflect the failure to build the two additional levels. By July 2016, the skyscraper had topped out, and had been completed a few months later.

As of 2026, Vision Apartments is the 8th-tallest residential building within the Melbourne CBD core, the 13th-tallest residential building in Melbourne, and the 17th-tallest building in Melbourne overall.

== Gallery ==
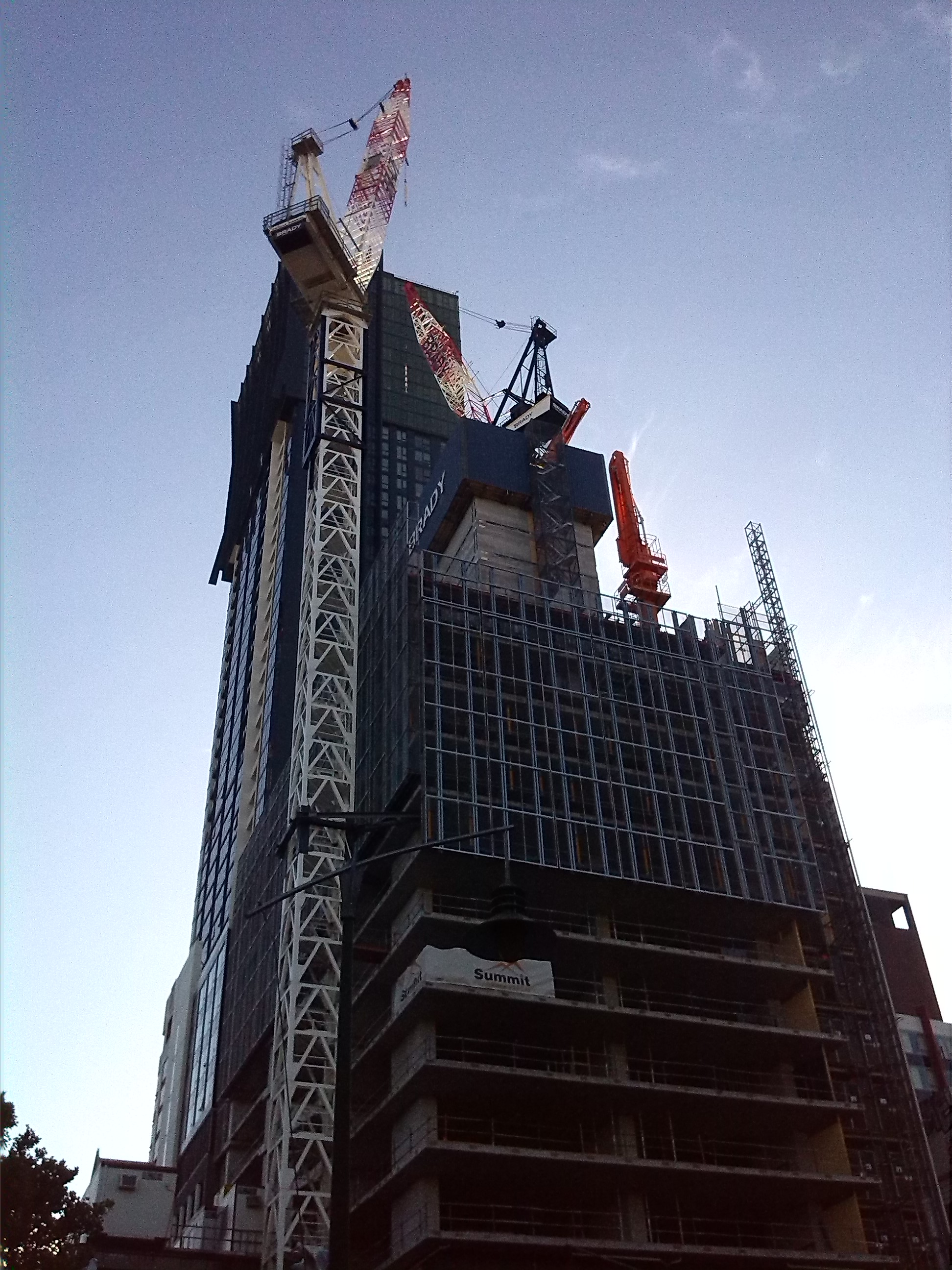
Vision under construction, in January 2015

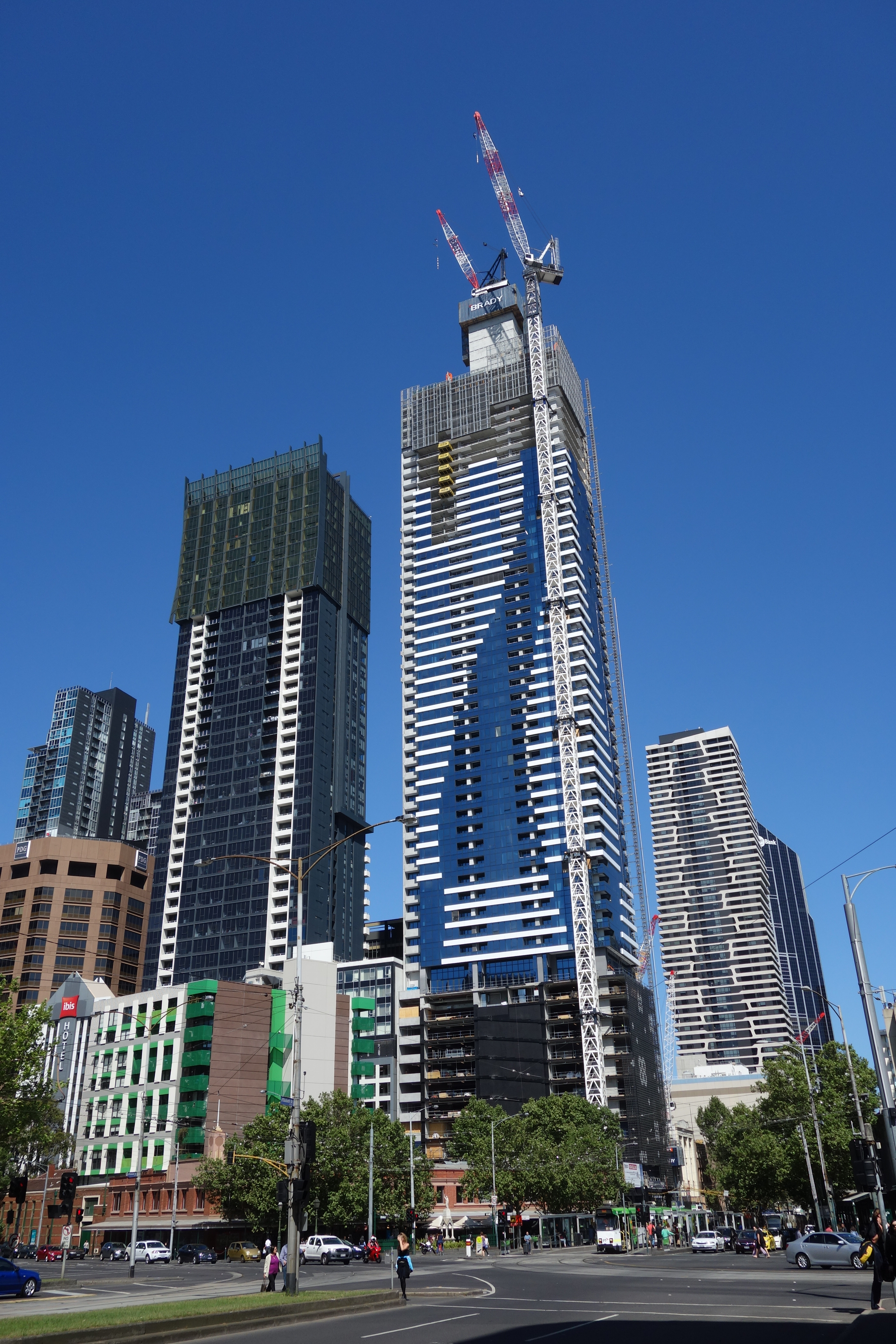
Vision under construction, in October 2015

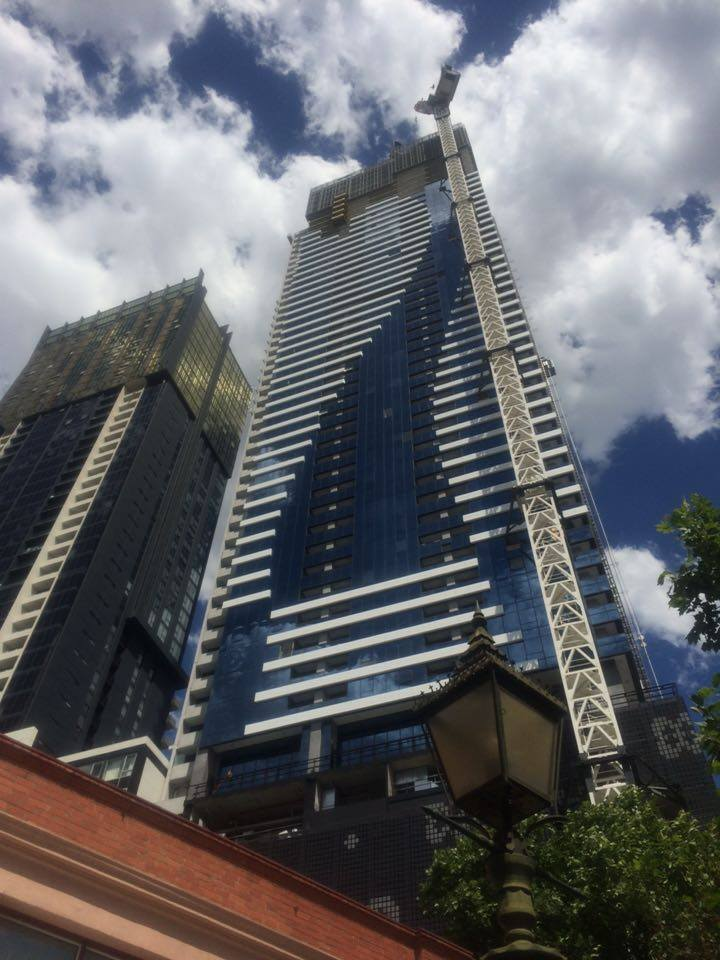
Vision under construction, in November 2015
