= Sparke Helmore Lawyers =

Australian company

- No. of offices: 9
- Offices: Adelaide, Brisbane, Canberra, Darwin, Melbourne, Newcastle, Perth, Sydney, Upper Hunter
- No. of employees: 800+
- Major practice areas: Corporate & Commercial, Government, Insurance, Workplace
- Founders: William Sparke & Basil Helmore
- Company type: Partnership
- Website: http://www.sparke.com.au/

Sparke Helmore Lawyers is a law firm with more than 800 employees working from nine offices across Australia. It aims to support the needs of the insurance, government, financial services, technology, mining, construction and property sectors.

== Overview ==
In 1882, William Sparke started a law firm in Newcastle New South Wales. In 1922, the firm changed its name to Sparke and Helmore when Basil Helmore became a partner. In 1949 another partner, Peter Withycombe, joined the firm which became known as Sparke, Helmore & Withycombe in 1950.

The firm opened an office in Sydney in 1962 to meet client demand. In the 1980s, it used its reputation in workers' compensation insurance as a platform to expand into insurance litigation areas, including public liability and some professional indemnity work. From there the firm specialised in commercial and government work.

In the 1990s, the firm expanded annually in terms of office locations, revenue and staff numbers. The Melbourne office opened in 1992, followed by Canberra in 1996, Brisbane in 1999, Muswellbrook in 2000, Adelaide in 2001, Perth in 2002 and Port Macquarie in 2014. In 2013, it was rated one of the top 10 law firms in terms of employer growth, partner numbers and proportion of female equity partners.

Between 1992 and 2001, the firm more than quadrupled in size, growing from a staff of 99 and revenue of $9.75m in 1992 to a staff of 610 and revenue of $65m in 2002/3.

In 2017, the firm merged with boutique Perth Insurance firm, Jarman McKenna, continuing to operate under the Sparke Helmore name.
