= West Side Place =

Building complex in Melbourne, Australia

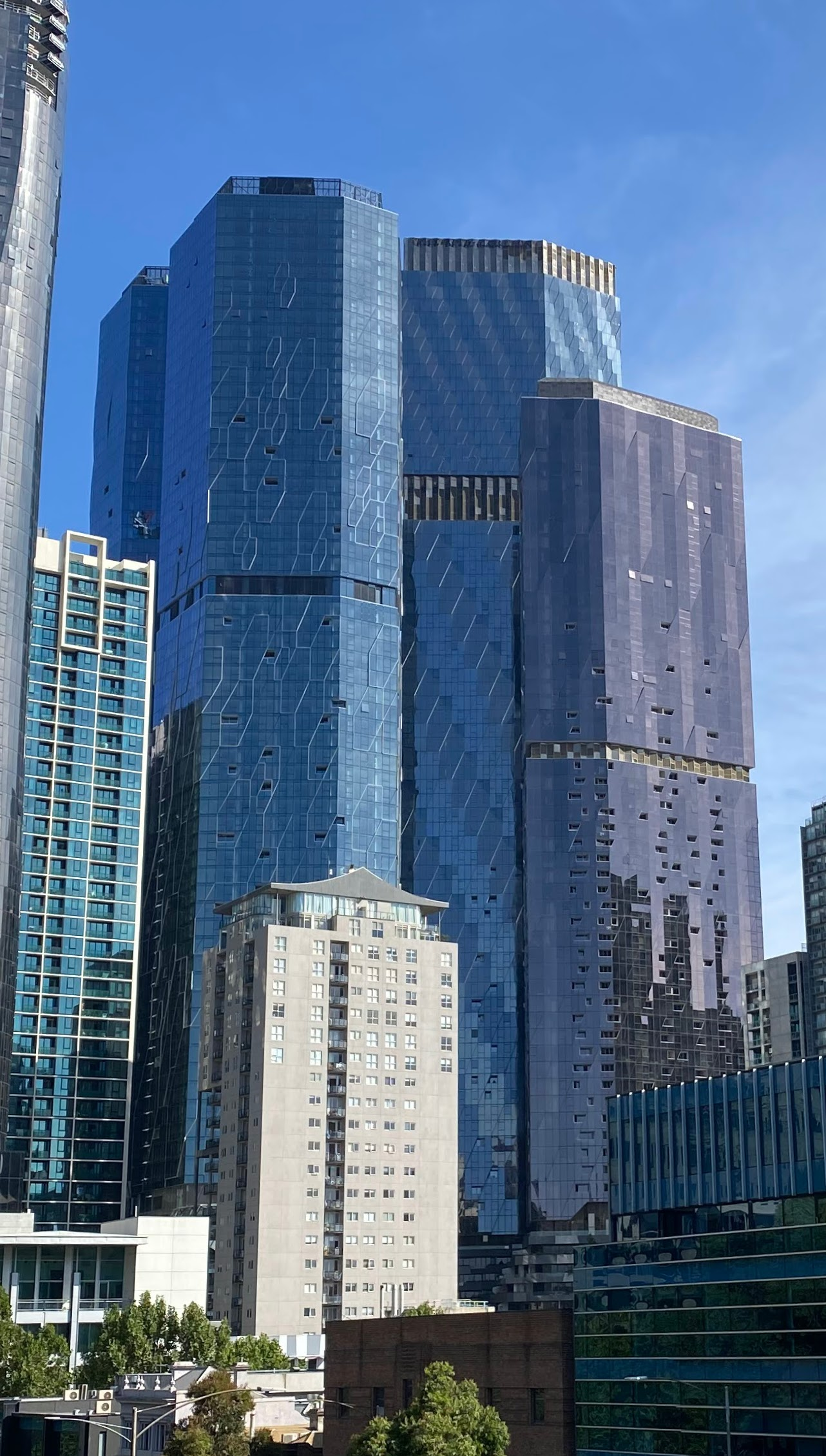
- West Side Place in 2023
- Interactive map of the West Side Place area

General information
- Status: Completed
- Location: 250 Spencer Street, Melbourne, Australia
- Coordinates: 37.8143°S 144.9529°E
- Completed: Tower A: 2021; Tower B: 2021; Tower C: 2022; Tower D: 2022
- Cost: A$2 billion

Height
- Roof: Tower A: 268.7 m (882 ft); Tower B: 206 m (676 ft); Tower C: 230 m (750 ft); Tower D: 239 m (784 ft)

Technical details
- Floor count: Tower A: 81; Tower B: 65; Tower C: 70; Tower D: 72
- Floor area: 97,000 m^{2} (1,040,000 sq ft) (in 4 towers)

Design and construction
- Architect: Cottee Parker Architects
- Developer: Far East Consortium
- Engineer: Winward Structures

West Side Place is a completed A$2-billion complex of four skyscrapers, located at 250 Spencer Street, Melbourne, Victoria, Australia.

== The complex ==
The tallest building in the complex, Tower A (Tower 1), comprises 663 apartments and 81 levels, reaching a height of 268.7 metres (882 ft). As of 2026, it is the fourth-tallest building in Melbourne and seventh-tallest building in Australia. In addition to the apartments, a 5-star hotel of 257 rooms occupies the building. Hotel chain The Ritz-Carlton have signed on to manage the hotel, which they opened in March 2023. It spans floors 61 to 80, with its sky lobby located on floor 80.

The 65-level Tower B (Tower 2) comprises 714 apartments and reaches a height of 206 metres (676 ft). Tower C (Tower 3) measures 230 metres (750 ft) in height across 70 levels, comprising 684 apartments and a 316-room, 4-star hotel owned by Dorsett Hospitality International. The 240-metre-tall (790 ft) Tower D (Tower 4) includes 835 apartments over 72 levels.

The $2-billion project is Melbourne's biggest inner-city development, encompassing 97,000 m^{2} (1,040,000 sq ft) of floor space. Developed by Far East Consortium, the complex was initially proposed in 2013, and was later approved in mid-2014 by then-Planning Minister Matthew Guy. It was proposed to be fully completed in 2022. Construction was suspended in February 2022 when contractor Probuild went into administration. The remaining two towers were completed by Multiplex in 2023.
