= 180 George Street =

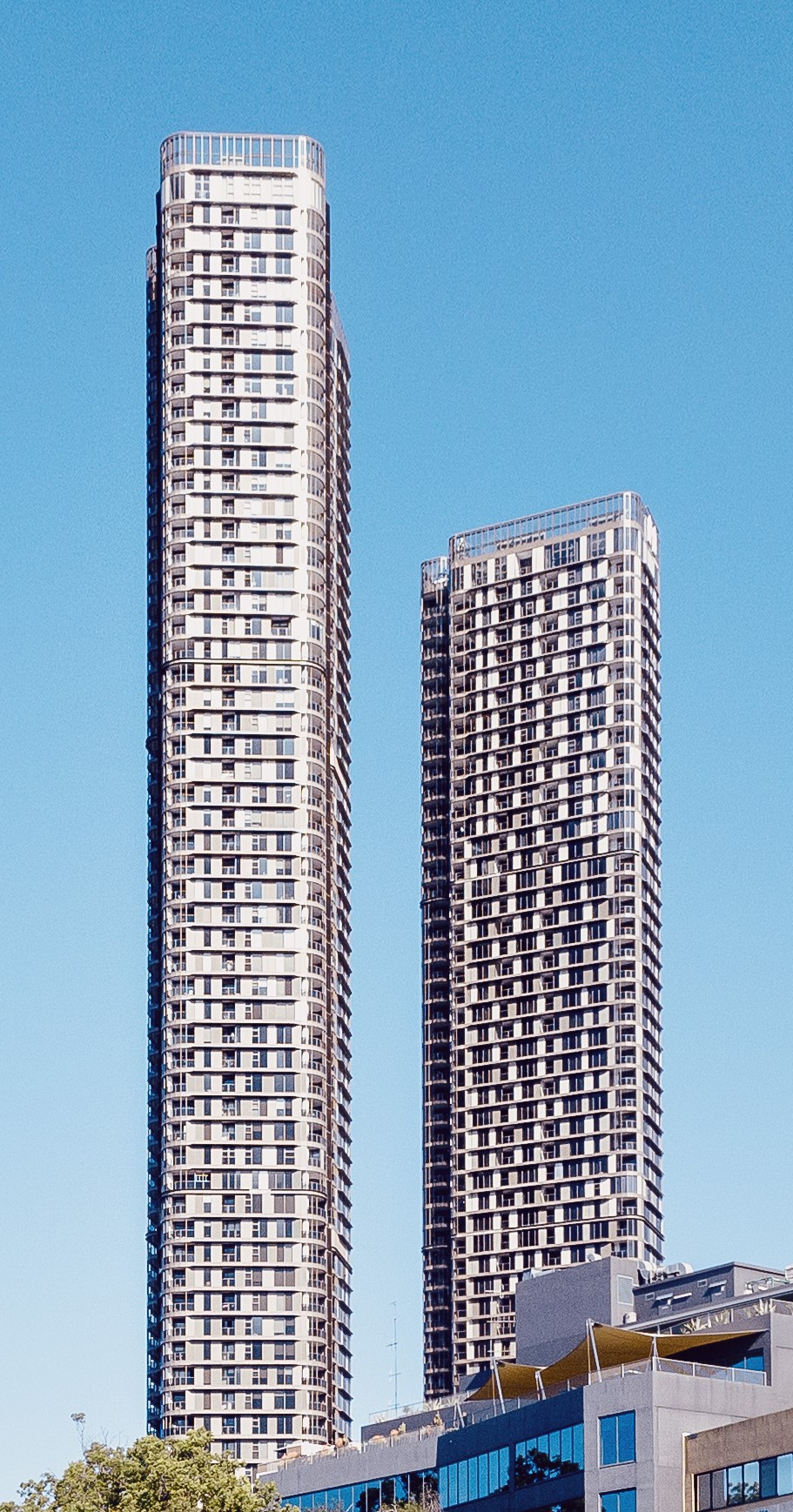
- The two towers in September 2024
- Alternative names: Charles and George Towers

General information
- Status: Completed
- Type: Residential apartments; Hotel apartments
- Architectural style: Neomodern
- Location: 180 George Street, Parramatta, New South Wales, Australia
- Coordinates: 33°48′53″S 151°00′35″E
- Construction started: 2019
- Completed: 2023; 3 years ago
- Cost: A$229 million

Height
- Height: 213 m (699 ft) (North); 189 m (620 ft) (South)

Technical details
- Floor count: 66 (North)

Design and construction
- Architecture firm: Woods Bagot
- Developer: Meriton

180 George Street (also known as the Charles and George Towers) is a residential apartment and skyscraper hotel complex in Parramatta, a suburb of Sydney, in New South Wales, Australia.

The complex consists of two towers that are 213 metres (699 ft) and 189 metres (620 ft) tall respectively, making them the current tallest residential towers in Parramatta. The two towers comprise 553 residential dwellings, while the hotel component comprises 346 rooms. The north tower topped out in July 2022, while the south tower topped out in November 2022. Both were completed by 2023

== Development & construction ==
The site was developed and constructed by property developer Meriton, with the towers being designed by Woods Bagot. Initial proposals were first lodged in 2016, with final approval being given in October 2019.

Construction commenced in the same year and upon completion, the towers became the tallest residential buildings in Parramatta.
