= Citigroup Centre (Sydney) =

Skyscraper in Sydney, New South Wales, Australia

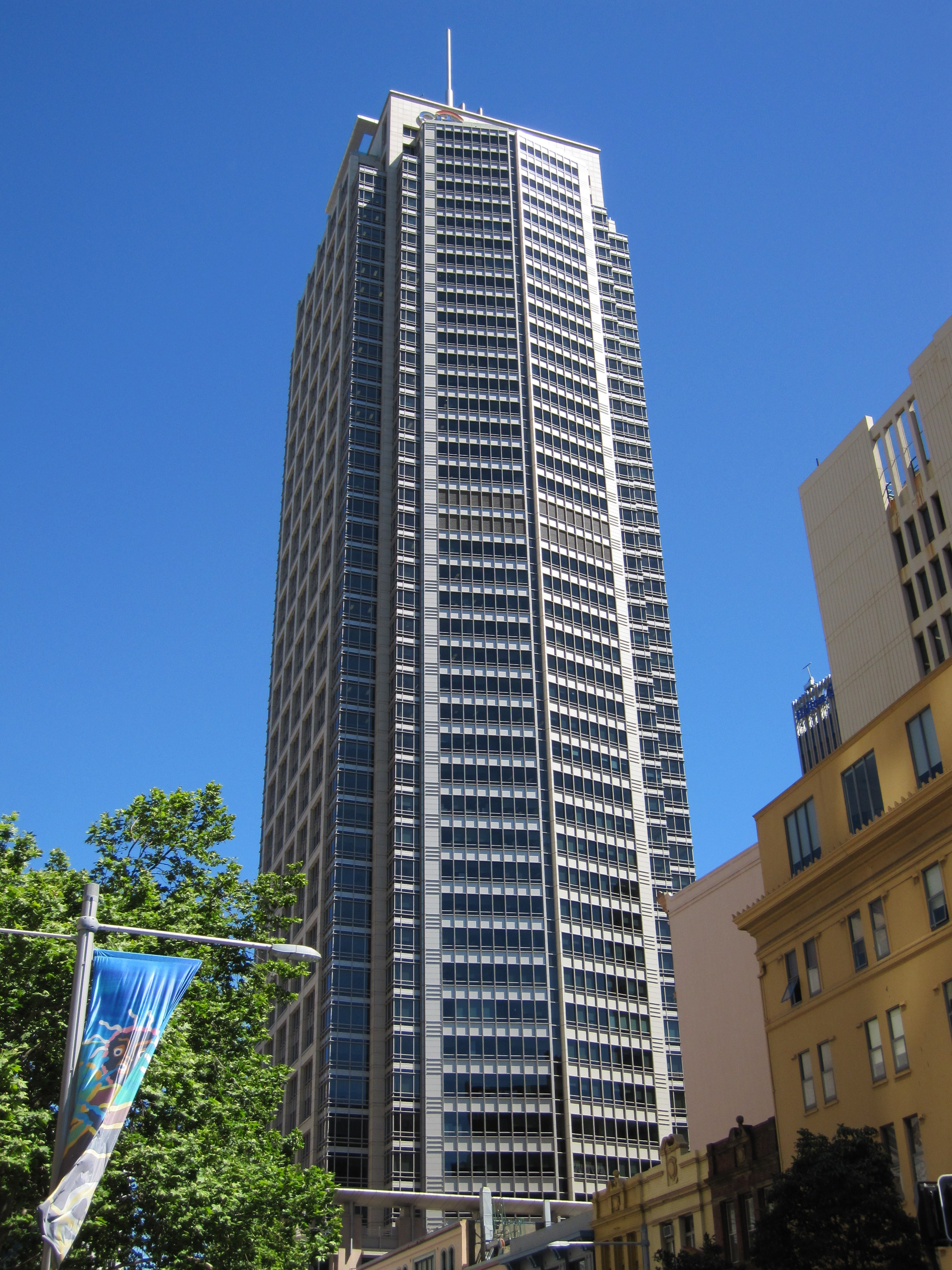
- Interactive map of the Citigroup Centre area
- Alternative names: Park Plaza

General information
- Status: Completed
- Type: Commercial
- Location: Park Street, Sydney, New South Wales
- Coordinates: 33°52′22.42″S 151°12′28.72″E
- Construction started: 1998
- Completed: 2000

Height
- Antenna spire: 243 m (797 ft)
- Roof: 206 m (676 ft)

Technical details
- Floor count: 50

Design and construction
- Architect: Crone Partners
- Main contractor: Multiplex

Website
- www.citigroupcentre.com.au

Citigroup Centre is a 243-metre (797 ft) skyscraper located on Park Street, Sydney, New South Wales, Australia. The building draws its name from Citigroup Australia who is the anchor tenant.

The building is one of the tallest buildings in Australia, however upon completion in 2000 it was the 8th tallest. Citigroup Centre is also the fifth-tallest building in the city when measured to its spire. The architect was Crone and Associates.

The building has 41 levels of office space, 5 levels of underground parking and four levels of commercial space known as "The Galeries". An underground retail arcade connects the lower ground floor to Town Hall station and the Queen Victoria Building.

The building is jointly owned and managed by the Charter Hall and GPT Group.

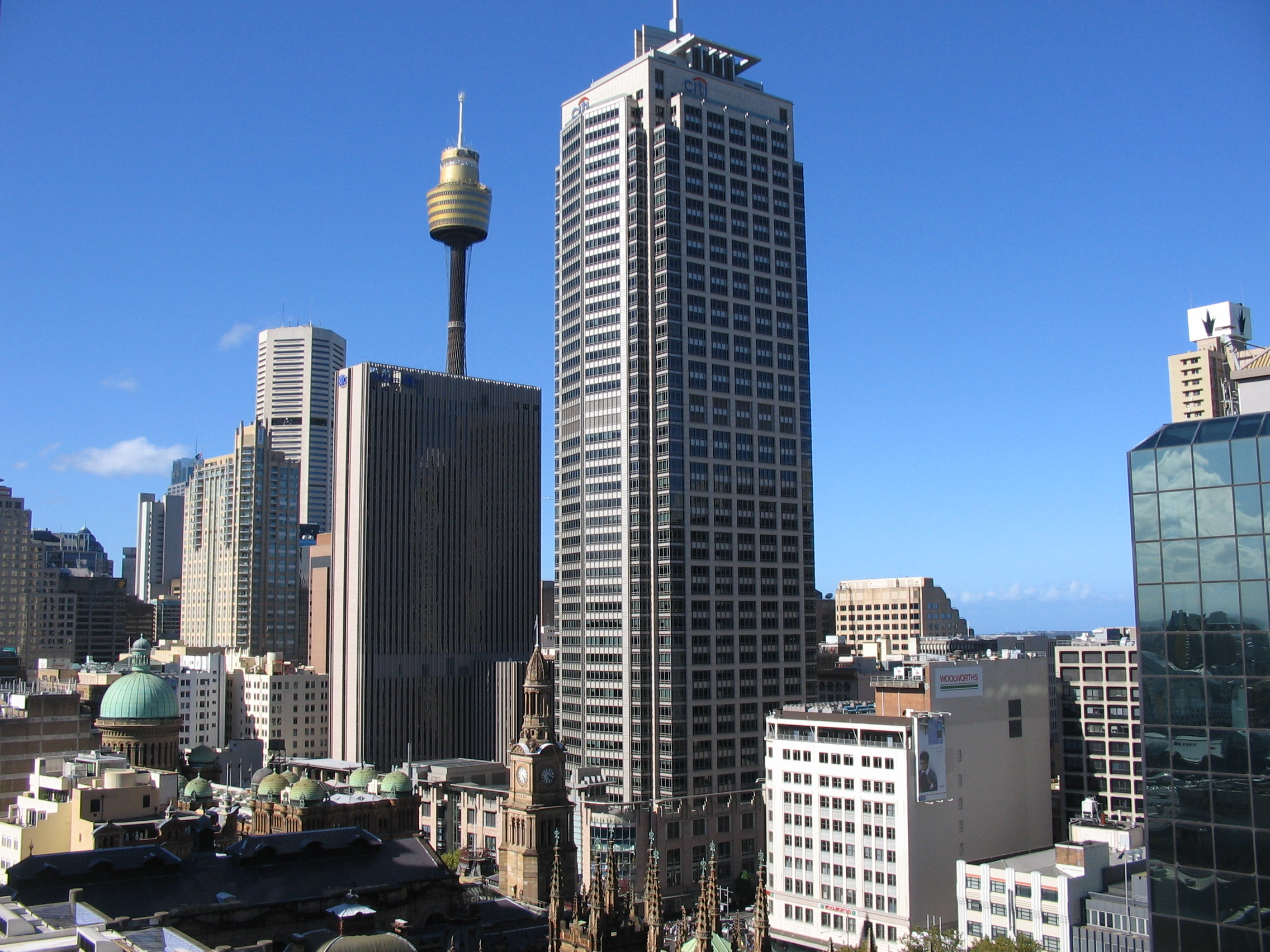
Tower and surrounds

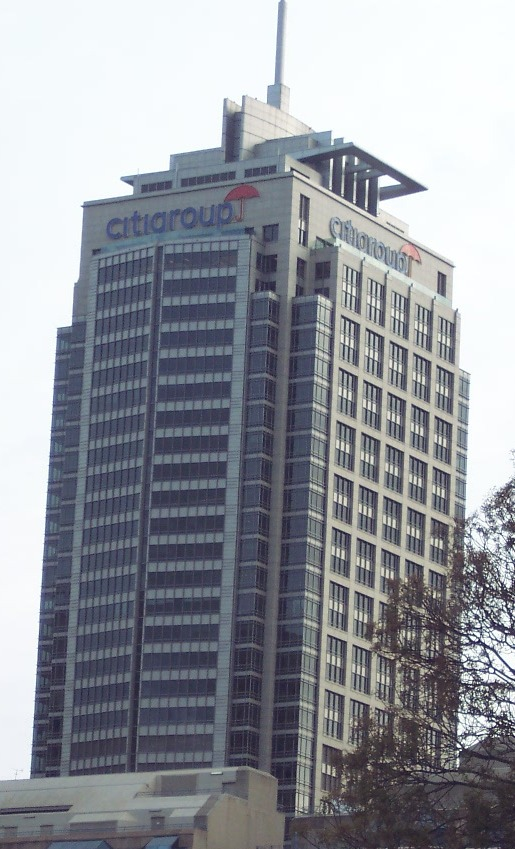
Upper levels

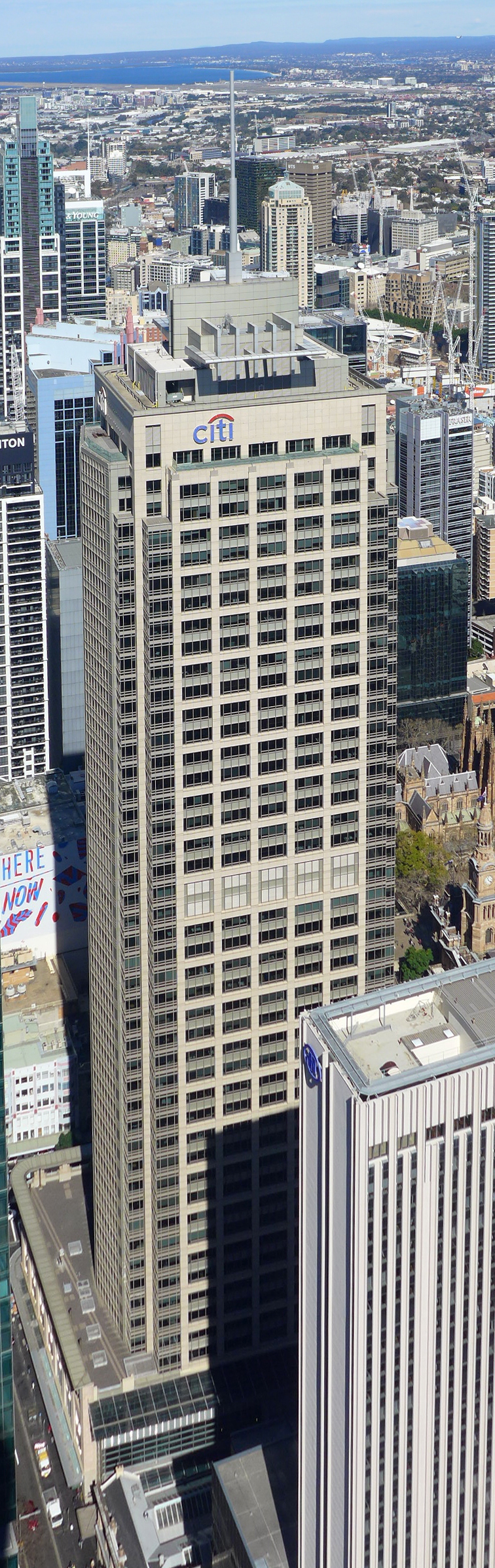
As viewed from above

== See also ==
- List of tallest buildings in Sydney
- List of tallest buildings in Australia
