= One Sydney Harbour =

Skyscraper complex in Sydney, New South Wales, Australia

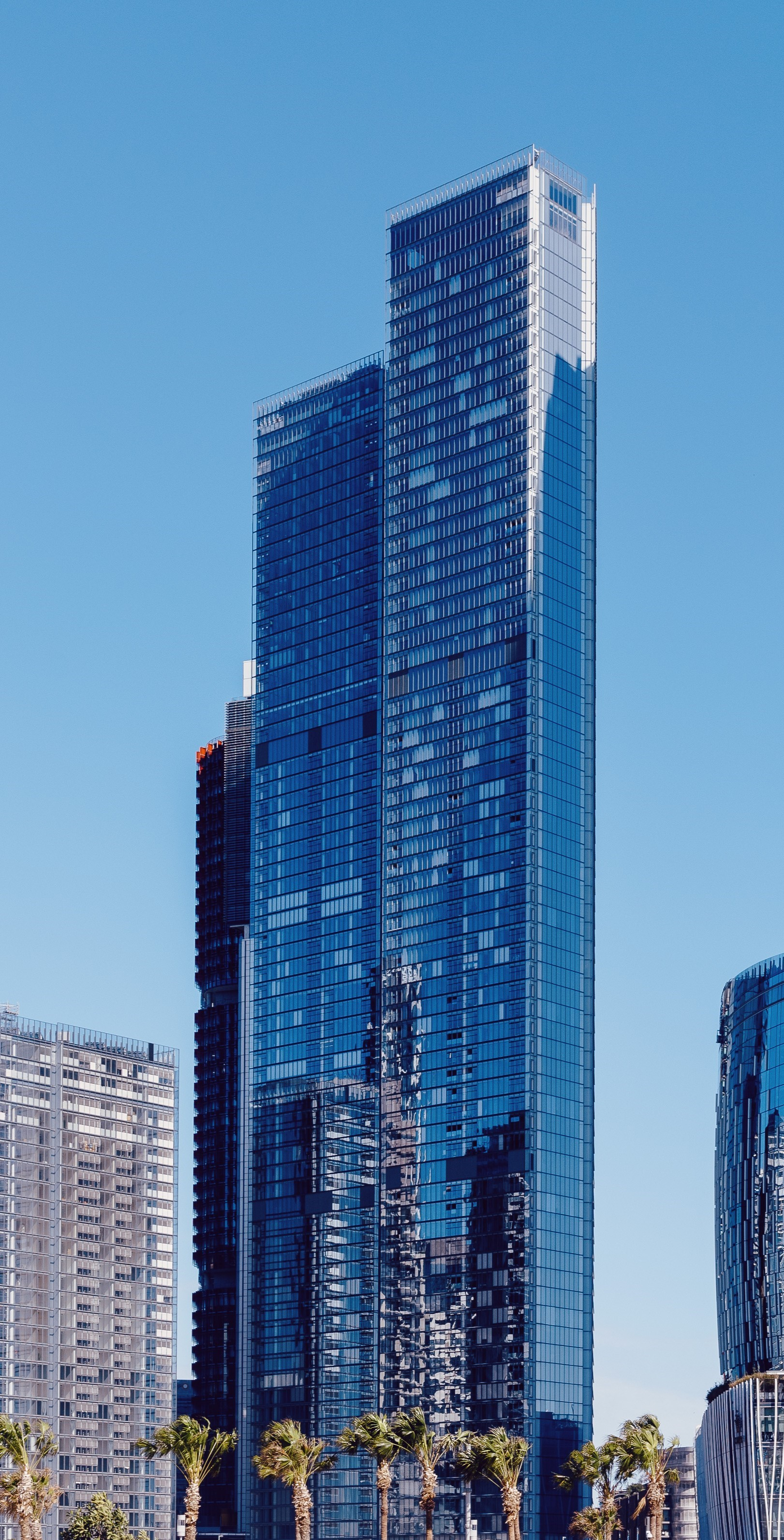
- August 2024
- Interactive map of the One Sydney Harbour area

General information
- Status: Completed
- Type: Residential
- Location: Sydney, New South Wales, Australia
- Coordinates: 33.862647°S 151.202061°E
- Opening: 2024
- Cost: A$850 million

Height
- Height: 247 metres (810 ft) (Tower 1); 230 metres (750 ft) (Tower 2); 104 metres (341 ft) (Tower 3)

Technical details
- Floor count: 72, 68, 29

Design and construction
- Architecture firm: Renzo Piano
- Developer: Lendlease

One Sydney Harbour is a skyscraper complex in Sydney, New South Wales, Australia. It consists of three towers which stand at 247 metres (72 floors), 230m (68), and 104m (29) tall respectively. Designed by Renzo Piano, the three towers comprise a total of 808 apartments. The project was built as part of a major urban renewal of the precinct of Barangaroo, which also includes the International Towers Sydney and Crown Sydney. The project was first proposed as an early concept in 2013, before Renzo Piano design entry was appointed as the final design in 2015. Approval was given to the two towers in 2017, with construction commencing in 2019. Tower 1 topped out in December 2022, with Tower 2 following in March 2023. All three towers were completed by April 2024.

In 2025, a three-story penthouse in the tallest tower was sold for A$142 million, making it Australia's most expensive home.

== Construction ==
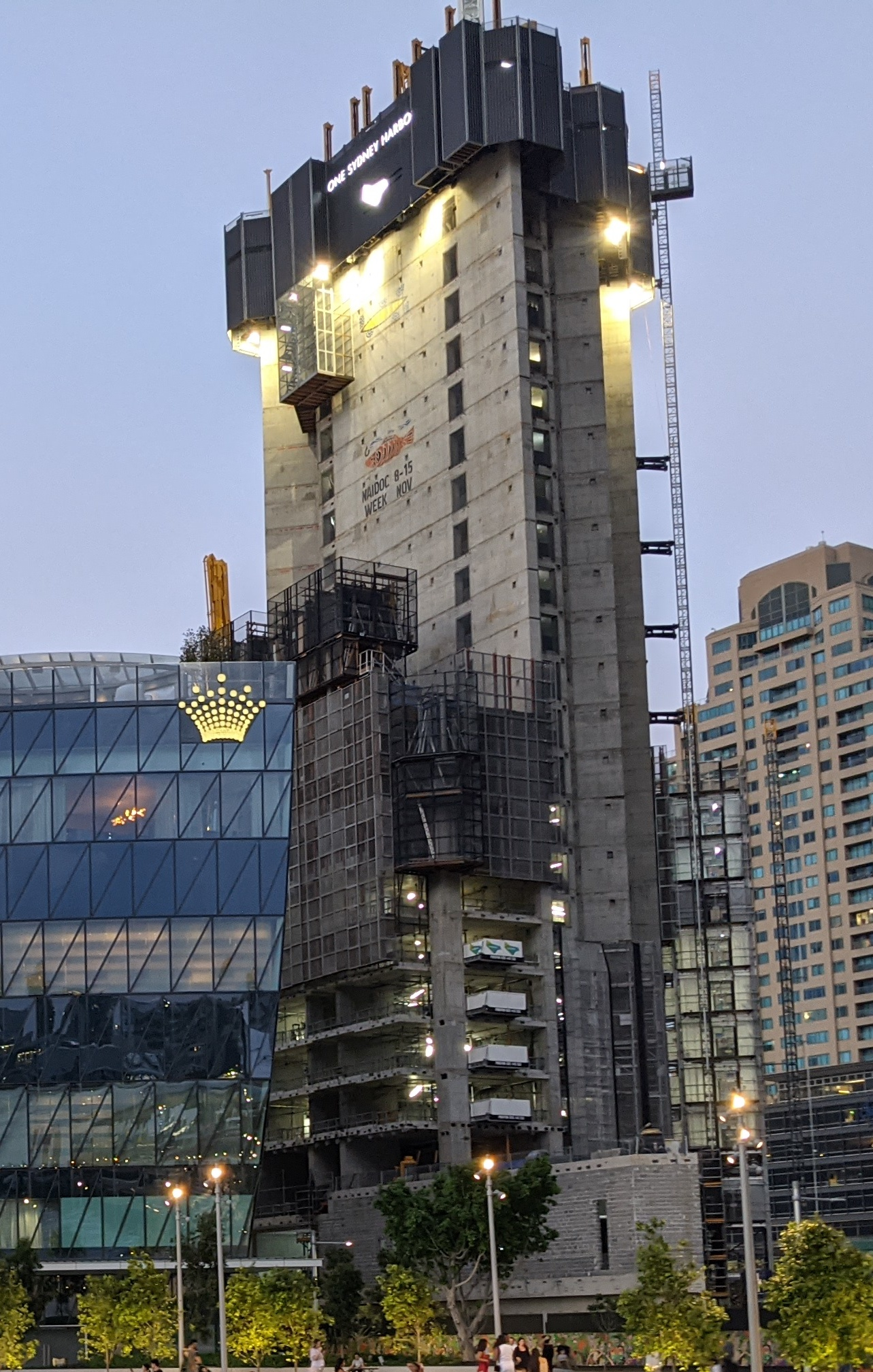
January 2021 (Tower 1)

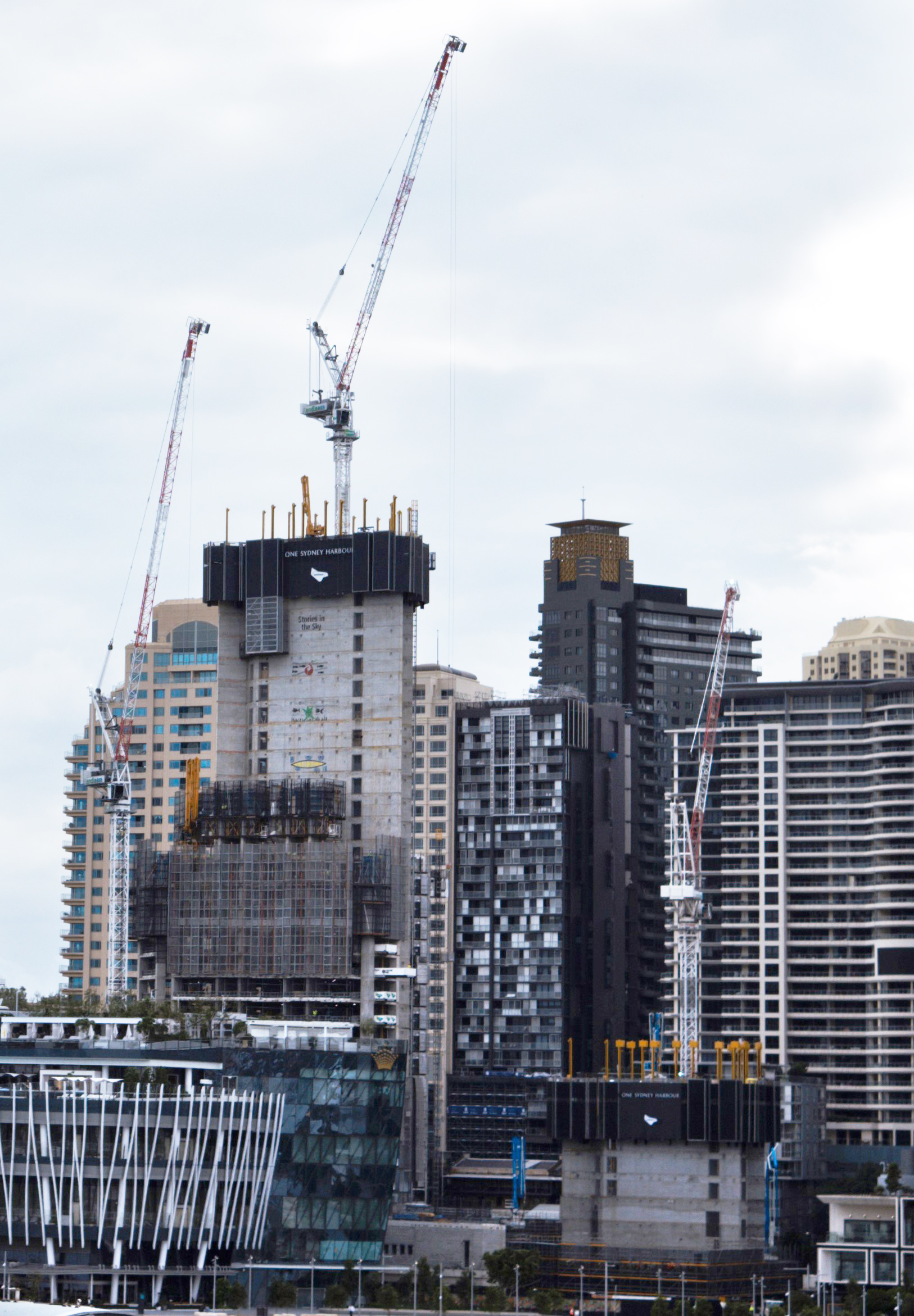
March 2021

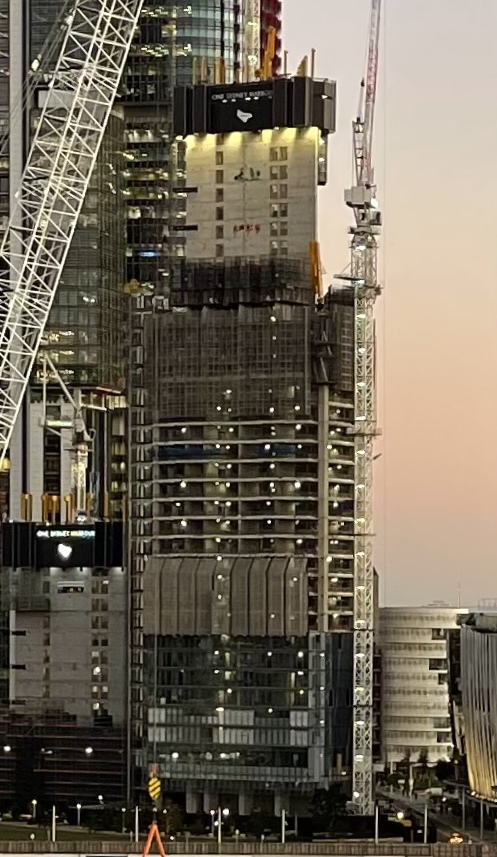
May 2021

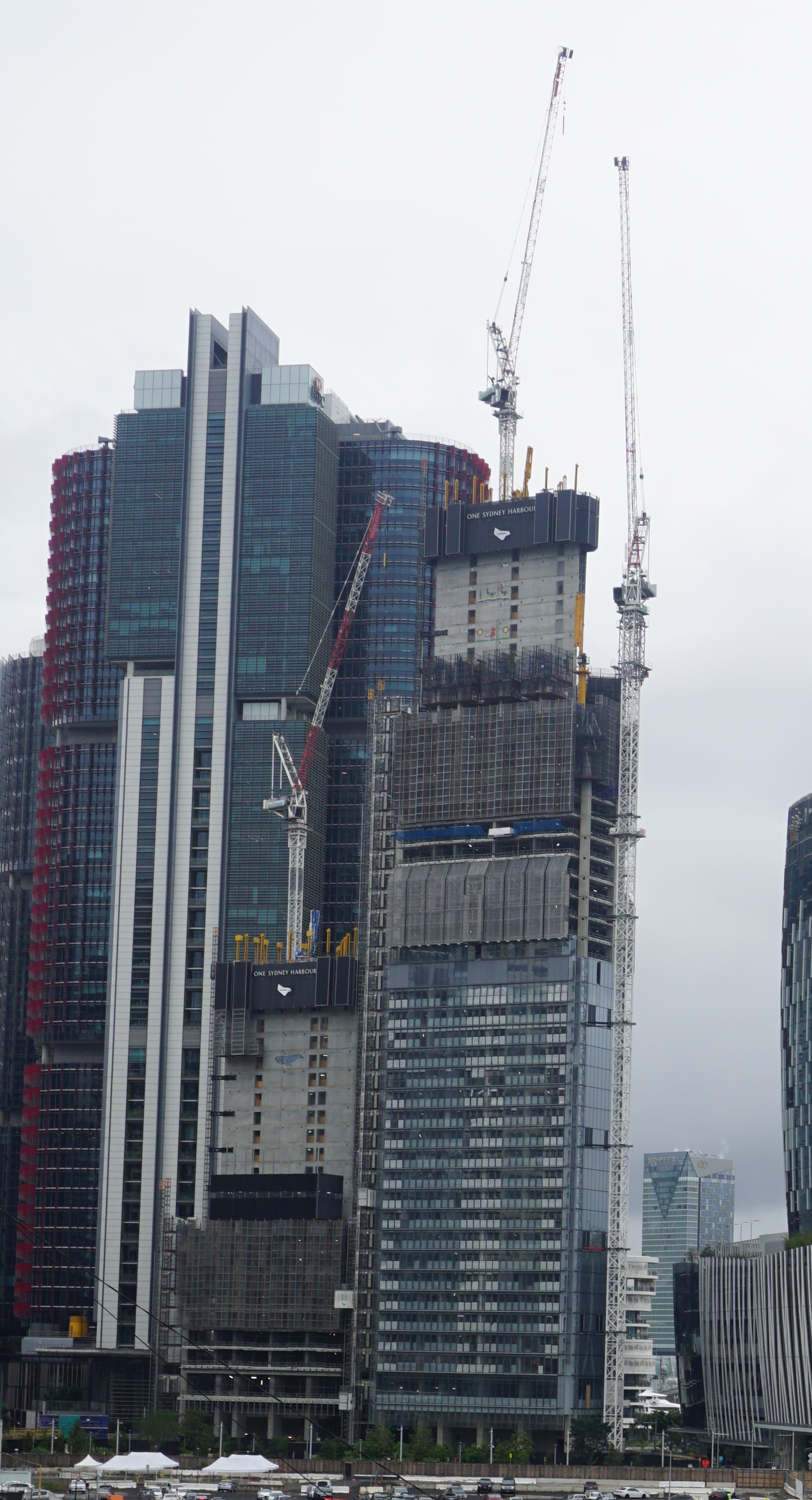
October 2021

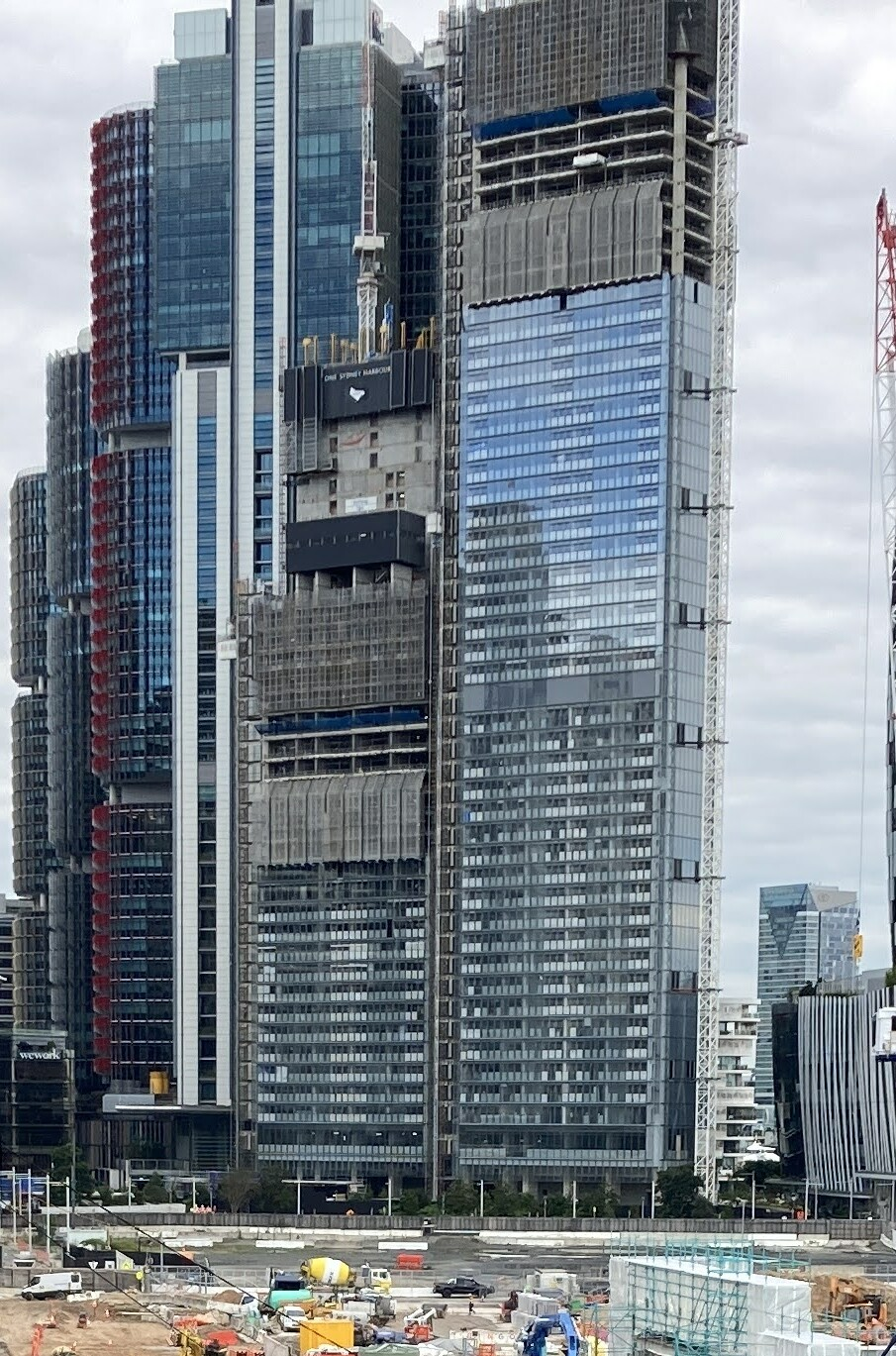
April 2022

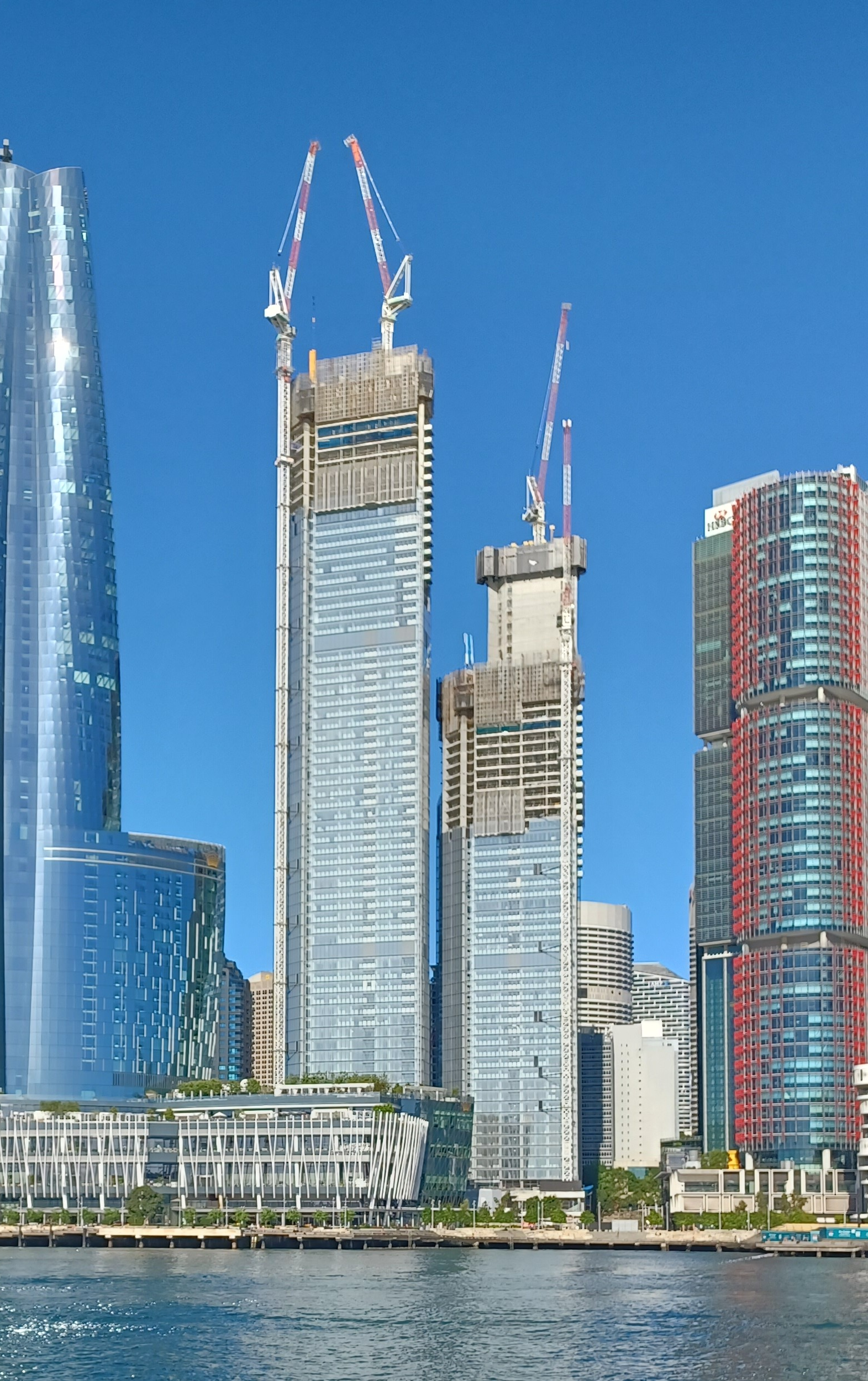
November 2022

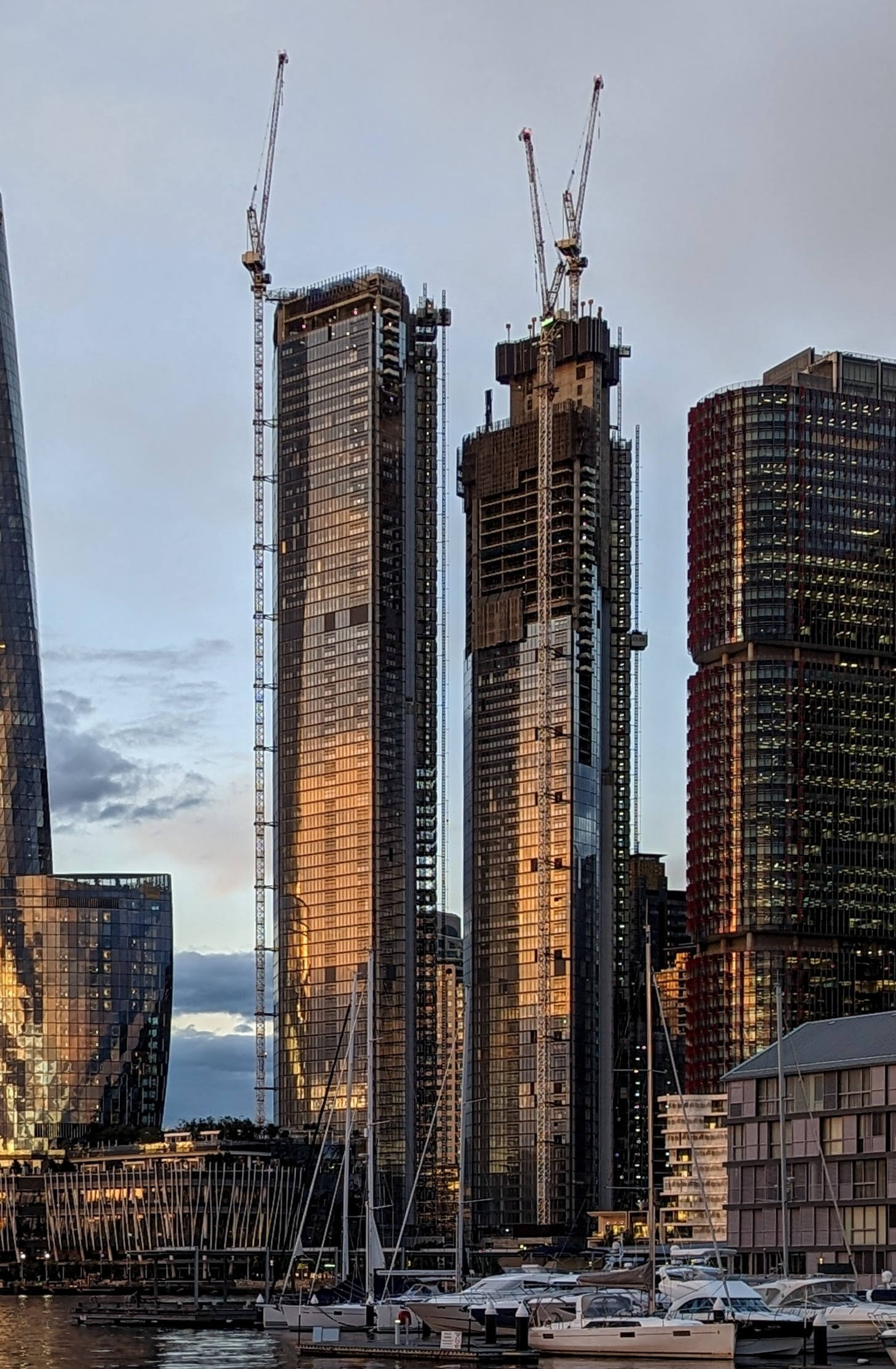
April 2023

== See also ==
- List of tallest buildings in Sydney
