= Salesforce Tower (Sydney) =

Skyscraper in Sydney, New South Wales, Australia

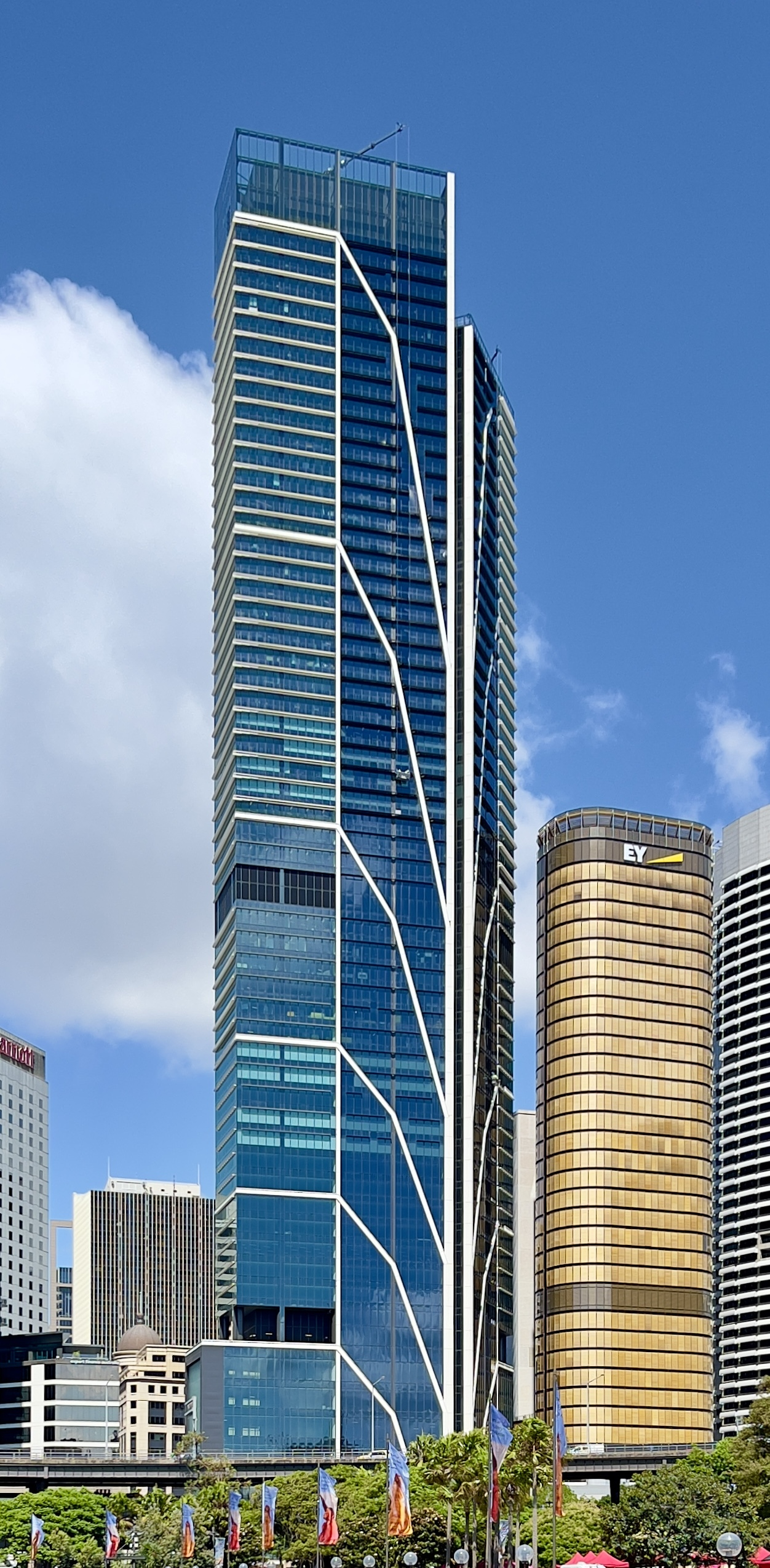
- Alternative names: Circular Quay Tower

General information
- Type: Commercial
- Location: Sydney, New South Wales, Australia, 180 George Street
- Coordinates: 33.8619°S 151.2087°E
- Current tenants: Salesforce; JLL; Preqin
- Construction started: 2019
- Opened: November 2022

Height
- Height: 263 metres

Technical details
- Floor count: 55

Design and construction
- Architecture firm: Foster + Partners
- Developer: Lendlease
- Main contractor: Lendlease

Salesforce Tower is a 55-storey skyscraper in Circular Quay, Sydney, New South Wales, Australia. Designed by Foster + Partners, the building stands at a height of 263 metres, making it the tallest office tower and the second-tallest skyscraper in Sydney behind Crown Sydney.

== History ==
Designed by Foster + Partners, the tower was built by Lendlease. Construction began in late 2019, with the core of the tower topping out in February 2022. It was opened in November 2022.

Salesforce acquired naming rights to the tower, taking tenancy of 13 floors.
