= Queens Place =

Queens Place may refer to the following places:

- Queens Place Mall, an urban shopping mall in New York City, United States
- Queens Place (complex), a twin-tower skyscraper project in Melbourne, Australia
