= Swanston Central =

Mixed-use skyscraper in Melbourne, Australia

- Looking west along Victoria Street towards Swanston Central (highest building centre)

General information
- Status: Completed
- Type: Apartments; retail; office
- Location: 160 Victoria Street, Melbourne, Victoria, Australia
- Coordinates: 37.8059°S 144.9618°E
- Groundbreaking: 2016
- Completed: 2020
- Cost: A$350M

Height
- Height: 236.7 metres (777 ft)

Technical details
- Material: All-concrete
- Floor count: 71

Design and construction
- Architecture firm: Elenberg Fraser
- Developer: Hengyi Pacific
- Structural engineer: WSP | Parsons Brinckerhoff
- Services engineer: Stantec
- Civil engineer: WSP | Parsons Brinckerhoff
- Main contractor: Multiplex

Swanston Central is a mixed-use skyscraper bordering the Melbourne central business district at 160 Victoria Street in the inner-city suburb of Carlton, Victoria, Australia. Built in stages between 2016 and 2020 by its main contractor Multiplex, Swanston Central consists of 1,045 residential apartments, 2,500 square metres (27,000 sq ft) of retail space over podium levels and 345 square metres (3,710 sq ft) of office space on the 22nd level.

Swanston Central was designed by the architecture firm Elenberg Fraser. The facade is clad in interlocking glass panels that change colour from pink to green at different times of the day.

Swanston Central was built on the site of the former Carlton and United Brewery, which operated under successive names and ownerships from 1864 to 1987, after which most of the brewery's remnants were demolished. The remaining buildings were listed on the Victorian Heritage Register, and the site was vacant until its purchase by Hengyi Pacific, Swanston Central's developer, in 2015.

Comprising 71 floors and standing at 236.7 metres (777 ft) high, Swanston Central is the 13th-tallest building in Melbourne and 28th-tallest building in Australia as of 2026, while also the only skyscraper in Carlton.

== History ==
Swanston Central was built on the site of the former Carlton and United Brewery, which was initially established as the Carlton Brewery in 1864. The brewery was later amalgamated with a brewery in Williamstown in 1888, forming the Carlton and West End Breweries Limited. In 1906, this company merged with other breweries to become the Carlton & United Breweries Pty Ltd, operating at the Victoria Street site until 1987. Most of the brewery's surviving buildings and structures were demolished in the 1990s, save for bluestone buildings on Bouverie Street and the Malt House on Swanston Street. The site remained vacant until its purchase by Hengyi in 2016, and the brewery site is listed on the Victorian Heritage Register for its historical, architectural and technical importance to the State of Victoria. An archaeological excavation which uncovered 2,187 artefacts took place at the site in 2013.

In March 2015, the site was acquired for A$64.8 million by developer Hengyi Pacific, an affiliate of the Chinese property developer group Shandong HYI, from the Australian arm of Singapore developer Chip Eng Seng. Construction commenced on 23 August 2016 and stage one was completed in 2018. Swanston Central was completed in the first half of 2020, the development costing $350M. Muliplex used precast formwork to build outriggers on the facade and installed the curtain wall behind screens to improve safety. Using swivel arm technology, curtain wall glass was installed to free-standing hero columns without tower cranes or mobile cranes. WSP | Parsons Brinckerhoff (rebranded as WSP in 2017), a subsidiary of WSP Global, provided structural and civil engineering for Swanston Central, while Stantec provided services engineering.
