= 385 Bourke Street =

High-rise office building located in Melbourne, Australia

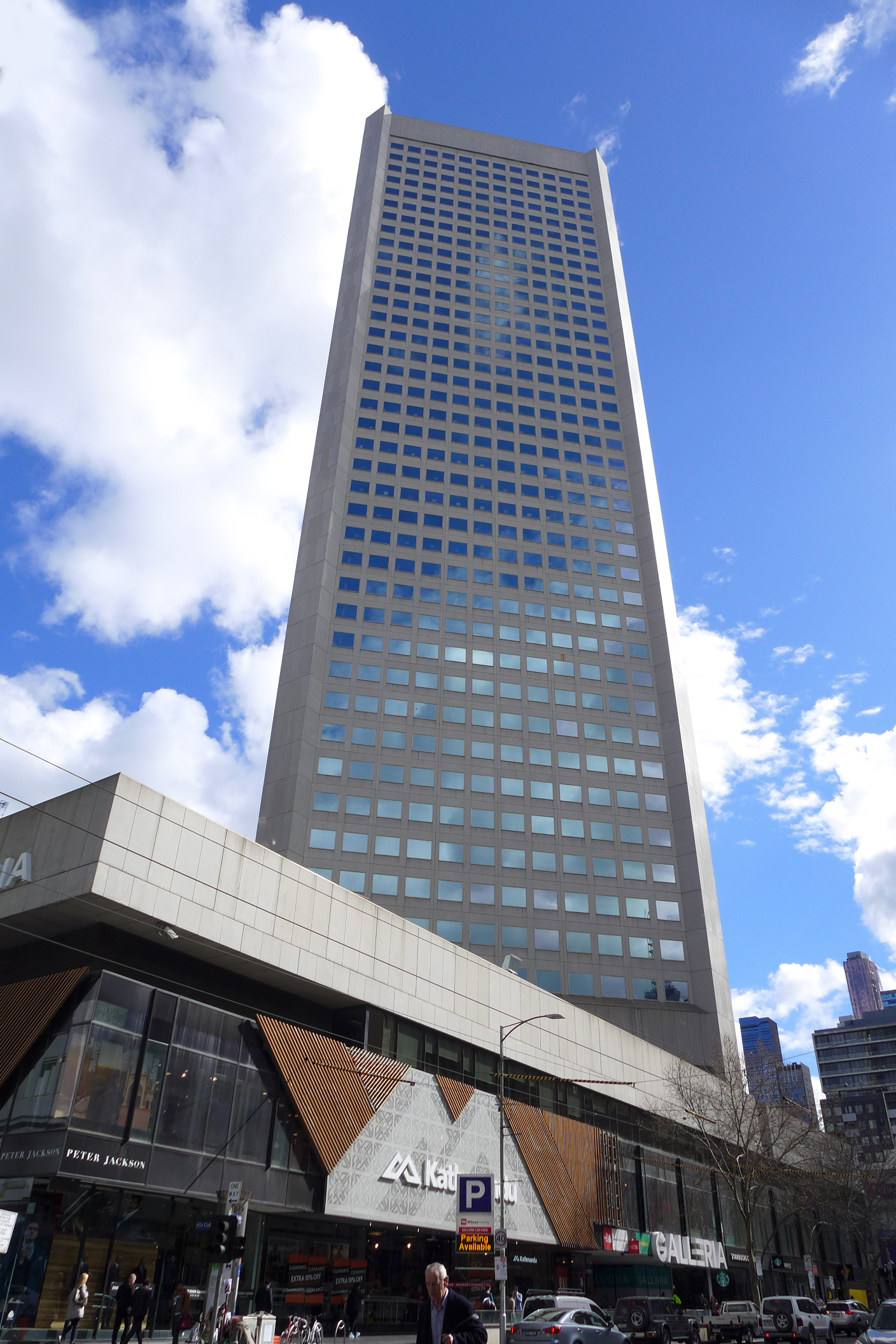
- 385 Bourke St, Melbourne

General information
- Status: Completed
- Type: Office
- Location: Melbourne, Australia
- Coordinates: 37.814776°S 144.962888°E
- Completed: 1983; 43 years ago

Height
- Roof: 169 m (554 ft)

Technical details
- Floor count: 41

Design and construction
- Architect: Eggleston MacDonald & Secomb (now DesignInc Melbourne)

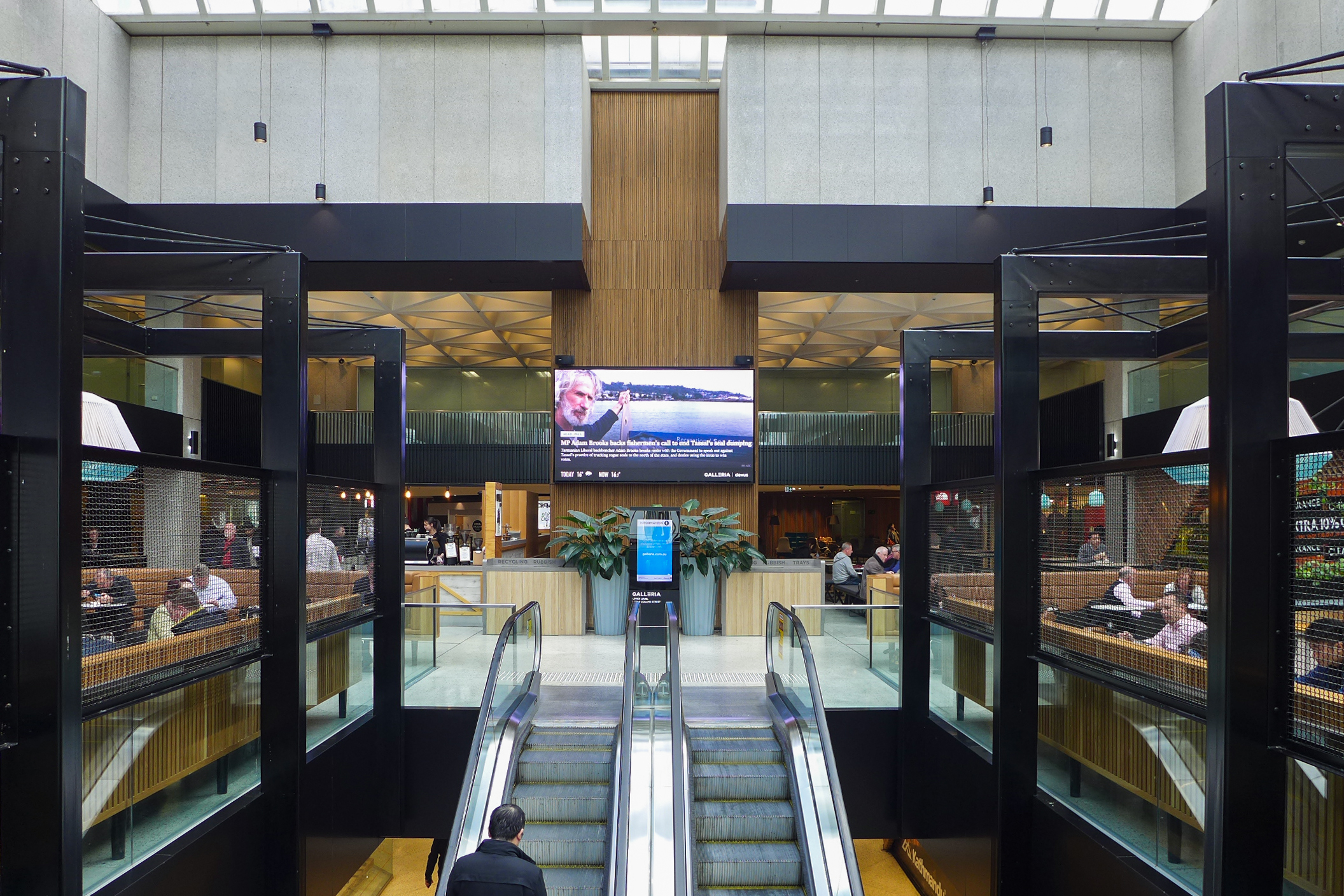
Food Court

385 Bourke Street is a high-rise office building in Melbourne, Australia, located at 385 Bourke Street on the corner of Elizabeth Street.

It was built between 1975 and 1983 as the State Bank Centre, the head office of the State Bank of Victoria, which was taken over by the Commonwealth Bank of Australia in 1990. It replaced their previous headquarters, a classical-style office building, built in stages between 1912 and 1935.

The lower levels of the building are the Galleria shopping centre. Major tenants in the building are EnergyAustralia, and industry superannuation fund UniSuper.

As of November 2026, 385 Bourke Street is the 50th-tallest building in Melbourne.
