= Grollo Tower =

- 1997 design proposal
- Former names: Melbourne Tower

General information
- Status: Vision
- Type: Hotel, Office, Residential
- Location: Melbourne, Australia

Height
- Roof: 2,224 ft (678 m) (proposal 1997); 1,837 ft (560 m) (proposal 2001)

Technical details
- Floor count: 113

Design and construction
- Architect: Denton Corker Marshall
- Developer: Grollo Group

Grollo Tower was a proposed skyscraper development in the Docklands precinct of Melbourne, Australia. The developer was Grocon, a construction company owned by the Grollo family.

With an original proposed height of 678 m, which was later scaled down to 560 m, the skyscraper would have been the world's tallest at that time. The proposed tower was designed by Denton Corker Marshall and an earlier concept, located on a different site, was designed by Harry Seidler.

The idea was scrapped in April 2001 after Melbourne's Docklands Authority ruled it out of the tender for development of the Batman Hill's precinct. The area is now occupied by a mixture of smaller commercial and residential buildings.

The Denton Corker Marshall design was reported to be later commissioned for construction in Dubai, as the Burj Khalifa. However, the Burj Khalifa was eventually built to an entirely different design, by Skidmore, Owings and Merrill.

== See also ==
- List of tallest buildings in Melbourne
