= Crown Towers =

Hotel skyscraper in Melbourne, Victoria, Australia

Coordinates: 37.822370°S 144.960434°E

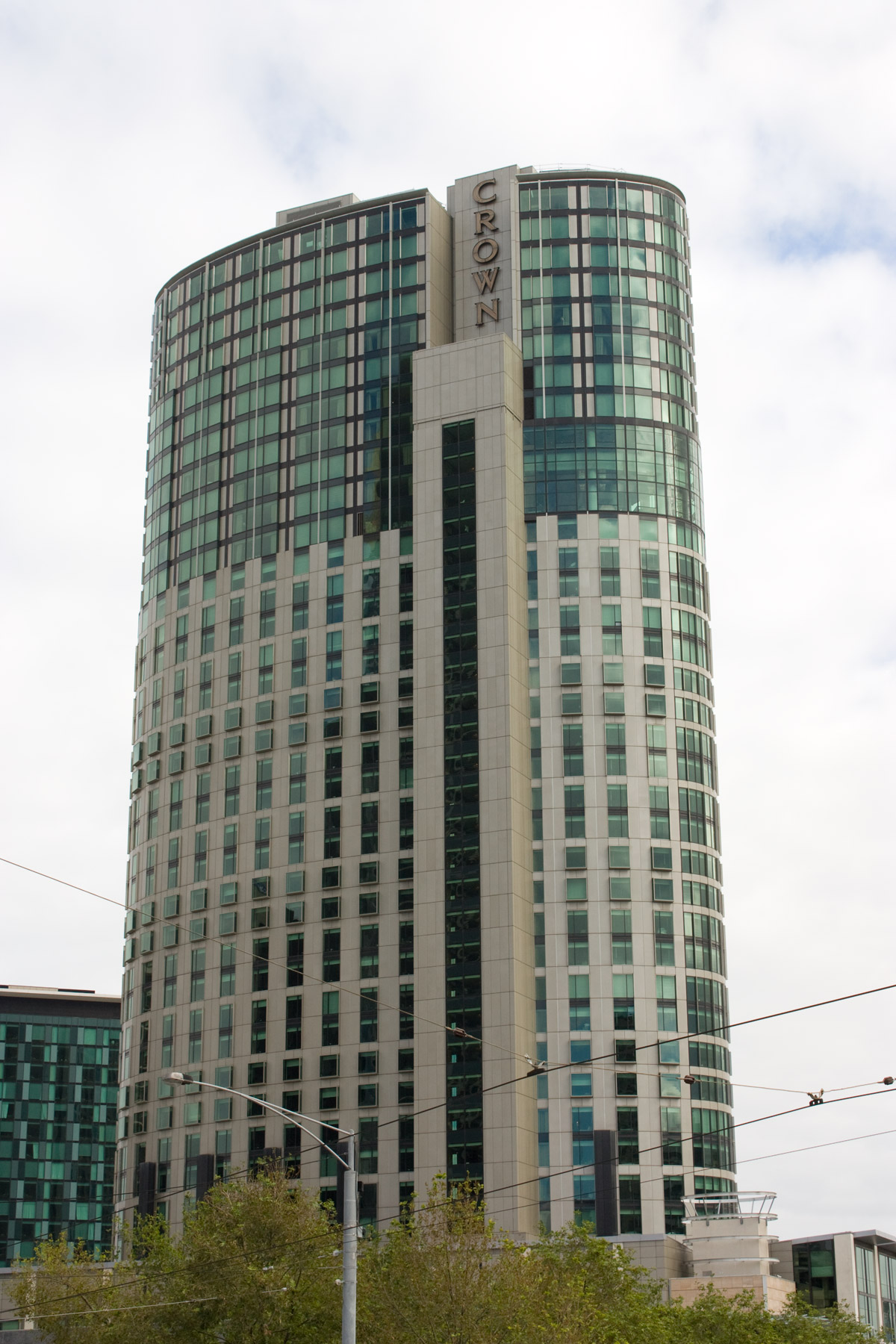
- Crown Towers in 2010
- Alternative names: Crown Towers Hotel; Crown Melbourne; Crown Casino Hotel; Crown Towers

General information
- Status: Completed
- Location: 8 Whiteman Street, Melbourne, Australia
- Completed: 1997
- Opened: 8 May 1997

Height
- Architectural: 152.5 m (500 ft)
- Roof: 141.5 m (464 ft)

Technical details
- Floor count: 43

Design and construction
- Architecture firm: Daryl Jackson Pty Ltd; Hudson Conway Architects
- Developer: Crown Resorts
- Main contractor: Grocon

Other information
- Number of rooms: 482

Website
- www.crownmelbourne.com.au/hotels/crown-towers

Crown Towers is a hotel skyscraper located in the Southbank precinct of Melbourne, Australia. Built in 1997, the hotel is one of three hotels at the Crown Casino and Entertainment Complex, the others being Crown Promenade (2003) and Crown Metropol (2010). Located on the banks of the Yarra River, it overlooks the city centre, Kings Domain, Port Phillip and Docklands.

== Description ==
Proposals for a Crown hotel to join the casino date back to as early as 1994, at a time when Crown casino was situated in a temporary location on the north bank of the Yarra River. Designed by Daryl Jackson and Hudson Conway, the Crown Towers hotel was completed in 1997 in Southbank, alongside the new casino complex. The 5–star hotel opened on 8 May 1997, albeit behind schedule. With 482 hotel rooms across 43 levels, Crown Towers stands at 152.5 metres (500 ft) in height – making it the tallest all-hotel building in Australia. The hotel was the first skyscraper (a high-rise building at least 150 metres (490 ft) in height) to be constructed in the Southbank precinct of Melbourne, a location wherein some of the tallest buildings in the city stand. As of November 2026, Crown Towers is tied as the 77th-tallest building in Melbourne.
