= List of tallest buildings in Melbourne =

Skyline of Melbourne
- Tallest building: Australia 108 (2020)
- Tallest building height: 316.7 m (1,039 ft)
- First 150 m+ building: 140 William Street (1972)

Number of tall buildings
- Taller than 100 m (328 ft): 155 (2026)
- Taller than 150 m (492 ft): 80 (2026)
- Taller than 200 m (656 ft): 31 (2026)
- Taller than 300 m (984 ft): 1

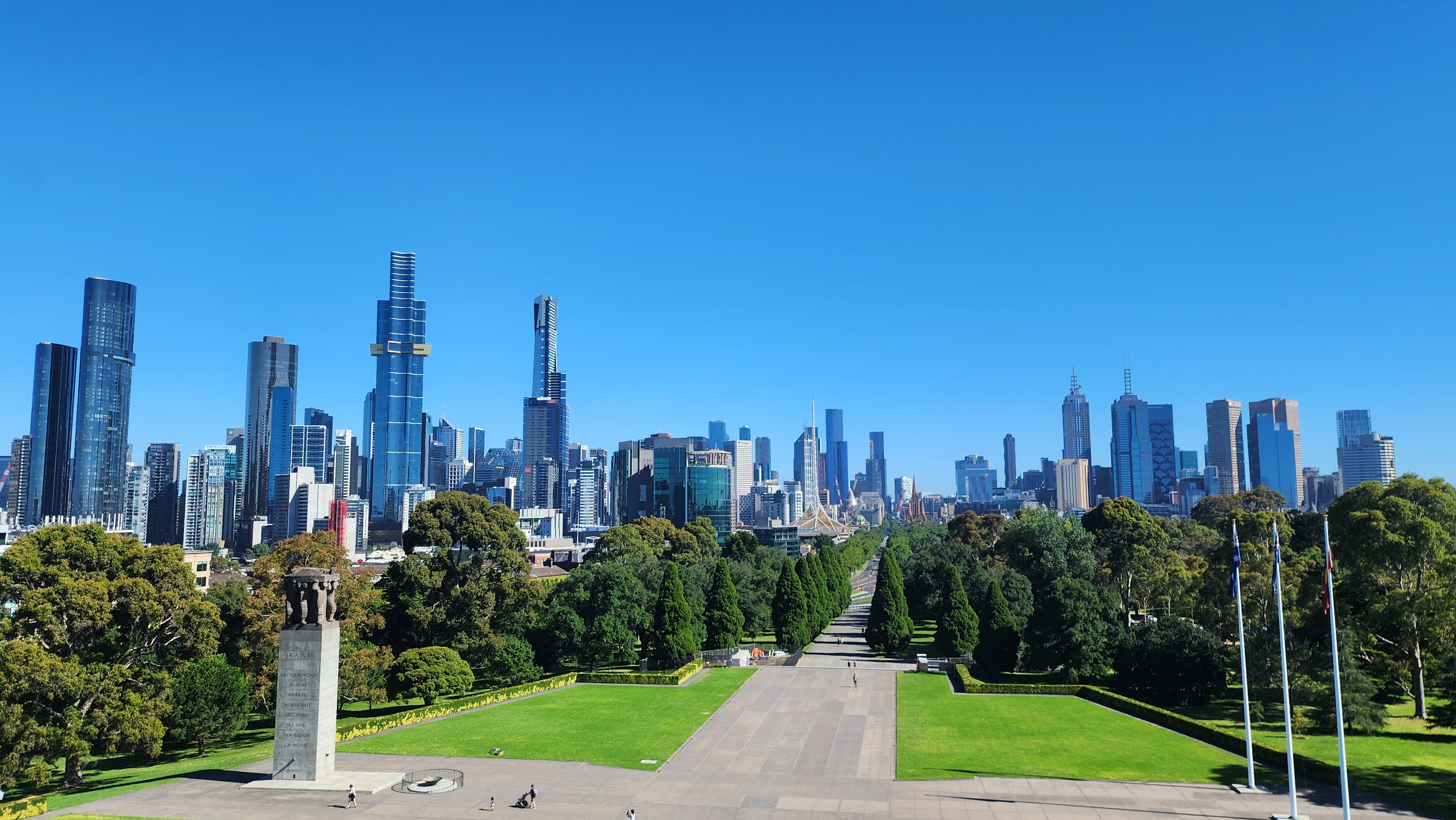
The skyline of Melbourne in January 2024, as viewed from the Shrine of Remembrance

Melbourne is home to approximately 758 completed high-rise buildings. Of those completed and topped out, 80 are defined as "skyscrapers" – buildings which reach a height of at least 150 metres (490 ft) – more than any other city in Australia. Overall, Melbourne's skyline ranks as the tallest in Oceania and the 24th-tallest in the world by the number of completed skyscrapers. As of 2026, the tallest building in Melbourne is the 100-storey Australia 108, which stands 317 metres (1,040 ft) in height; whilst being the second-tallest building in Australia, it is the tallest to roof.

Geographically, most of Melbourne's tallest skyscrapers are concentrated in the Melbourne central business district (CBD); however, other locations of prominent skyscrapers and tall buildings in Melbourne include Box Hill, Carlton, Docklands, Southbank, South Melbourne, South Yarra and St Kilda Road. The CBD, defined by a grid of streets known as the Hoddle Grid, has a historically low central shopping area with a high-rise cluster in the western financial district and another in the eastern end. Buildings are more densely packed in the west than the east, although the latter has some of the CBD's tallest buildings to architectural feature – 120 Collins Street and 101 Collins Street – whilst West Side Place Tower A, located in the western district, is taller to roof. In the 2010s, another skyscraper cluster rose in the northern section, which contains the CBD's tallest building, Aurora Melbourne Central.

Historically, Melbourne has been associated with several architectural milestones and building height records in Australia. During a brief skyscraper boom from 1888 to 1892, the city was one of the first in the world to build numerous tall office buildings, alongside New York City and Chicago in the United States. This period produced the APA Building (1889), which was among Australia's first high-rise and its tallest at the time.

Melbourne later played an important role in post-war high-rise development with the construction of ICI House (Orica House) in 1958, widely regarded as Australia's first modern skyscraper. From 1986 to 2005, the city hosted Australia's tallest buildings in succession: the Rialto Towers (1986–1991), 101 Collins Street (1991) and 120 Collins Street (1991–2005). Since 2006, Melbourne has been the location of the second-tallest buildings in the country – Eureka Tower (2006–2020) and Australia 108 (2020–present). Each skyscraper was, at one time, the tallest building in Australia by roof height, surpassed in overall height only by Q1 on the Gold Coast.

== History and specifications ==
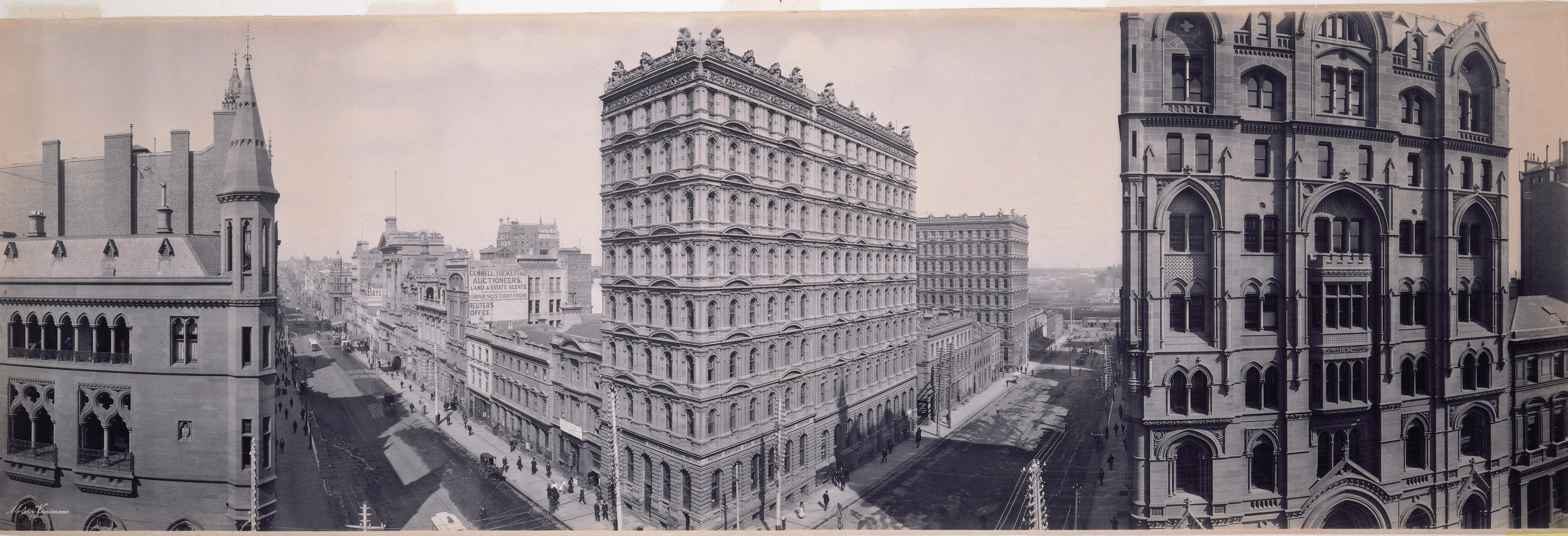
The intersection of Collins Street and Queens Street in 1903

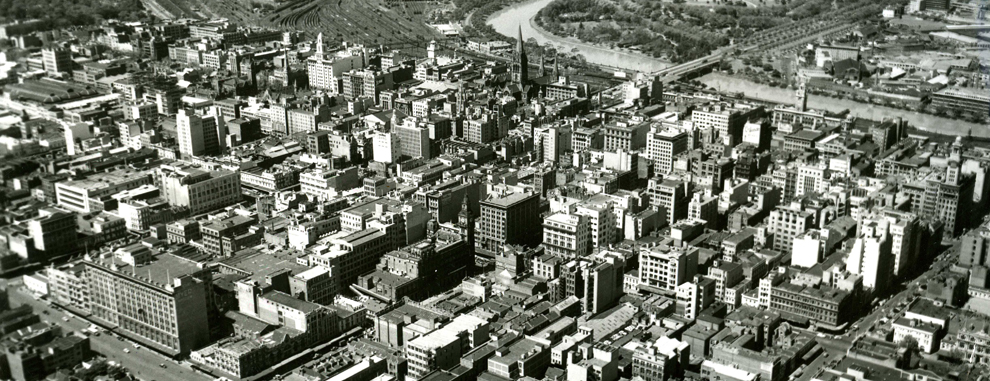
An aerial view of Melbourne in 1956

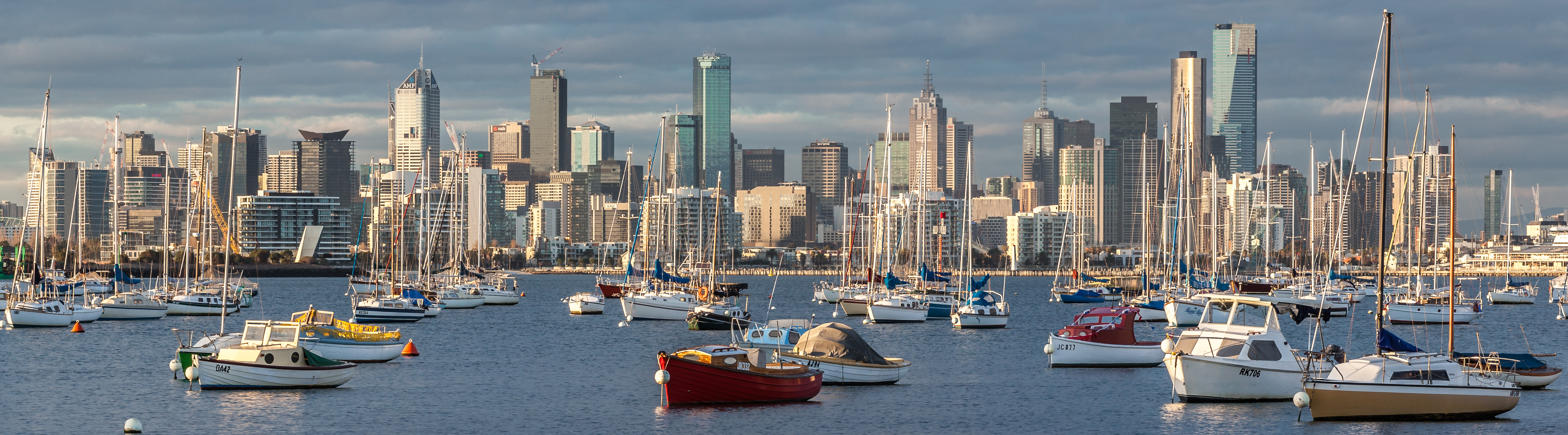
The skyline of Melbourne city as viewed from Williamstown in June 2015

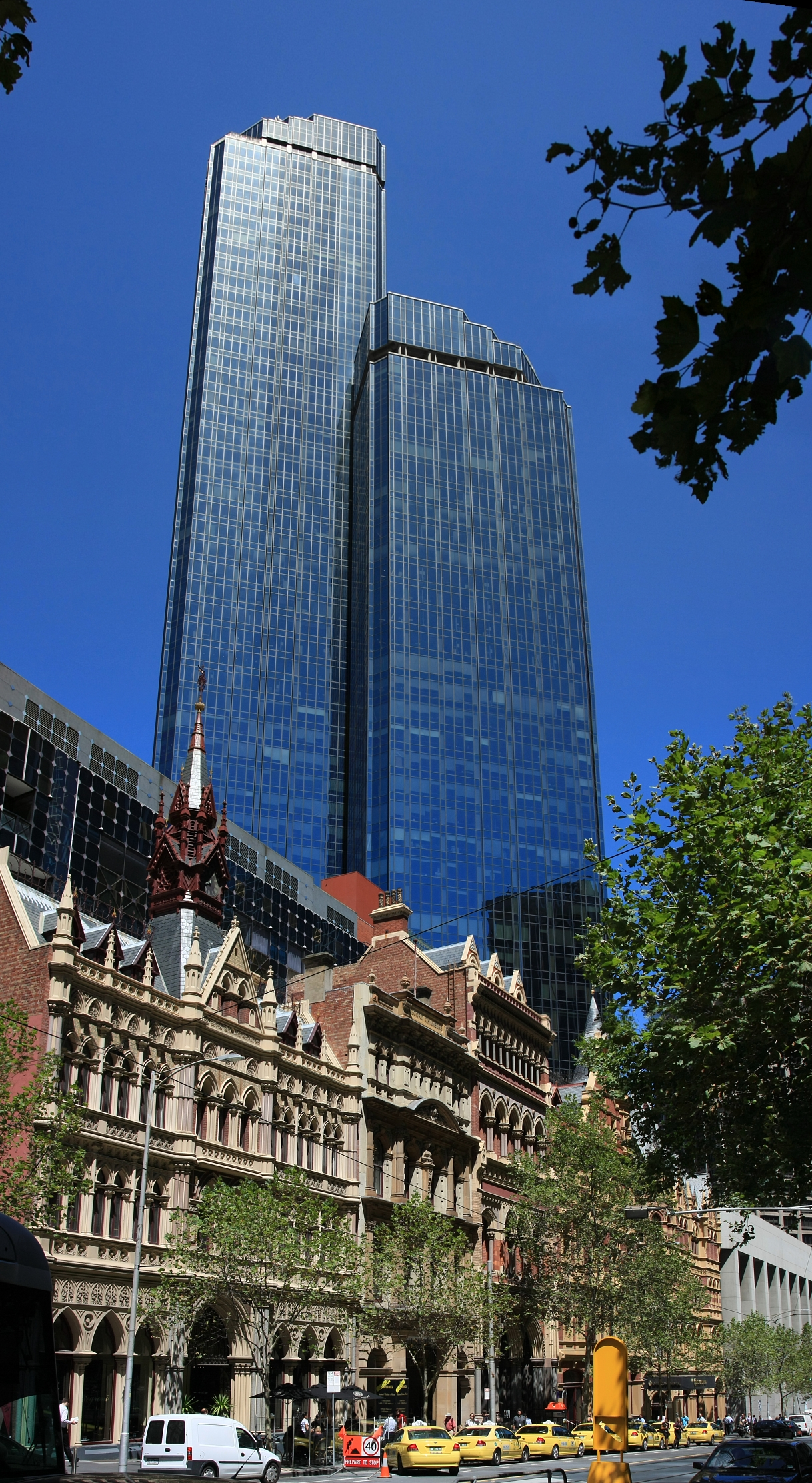
Rialto Towers was the tallest building in the Southern Hemisphere from 1986 to 1991.

=== 19th century ===
The late 1880s land boom saw the construction of 11 "lofty edifices" of 8 to 10 floors, made possible by the introduction of a pressurised hydraulic power network to operate lifts, and taking load bearing brickwork to great heights. The APA Building (Australian Building), at 12 floors topped with a spire, was the tallest, and can claim to be Australia's first skyscraper and amongst the tallest high-rise buildings in the world when completed in 1889. Other skyscrapers located in the CBD during this period included the Finks Building and 3 matching "Prell's Buildings". They were mostly built in an elaborate High Victorian style, with facades of stucco Renaissance Revival elements, a deviation being the APA building which was in red brick Queen Anne, prompting architectural historian Miles Lewis to comment that Melbourne had become a "Queen Anne Chicago". All except two were torn down in the post-war boom of the 1960s and 1970s, with the APA controversially demolished in 1981.

=== 20th century ===
Following much discussion, a 40-metre (130 ft) height limit was introduced to Melbourne in 1916, along with regulations concerning fire-proof construction. This height is often said to have been the limit of fire ladders at the time, but this was an idea that the then fire chief allowed to be widely circulated even though the tallest ladder rose to only 25 metres (82 ft), in order to ensure that fire safety was paramount. (Note: In 1897, the "Great Fire" burnt out a whole city block.) The main reasons for the limit, as well as fire proofing, were the preservation of light and air to the streets, avoiding congestion, and the influence of the City Beautiful movement, preferring evenly scaled streetscapes over those with buildings of varying heights. The height limit remained in force for nearly 40 years, allowing only uninhabited architectural features to project beyond the 40 metre limit. The Manchester Unity Building (1932), for instance, achieved a total height of 64 metres (210 ft) to the top of its corner tower.

Melbourne was the first city in Australia to undergo a post-war high-rise boom, which began in the late 1950s (though Sydney in the following decades built more), with over 50 high-rise buildings constructed between the 1970s and 1990s. ICI House (1955) was constructed after being granted a variation to the height limit; at a height of 81 metres (266 ft), the building was Australia's first International-style high-rise. Its variation was on the basis that the design included an open garden space at ground level, introducing the concept of floor area ratio, where a total allowable floor area is used instead of a specific height limit. This was formalised by "plot ratios" of 1:8 to 1:12 for different areas of the CBD in the "Borrie Report" in 1964, which was modified into a series of "plot ratio benefit" schemes in the early 1980s, where the upper level of floor area could only be achieved in return for certain public benefits, such as a public arcade. Plot ratios remained in force for every site until 1999, when the "New Format" Planning Scheme included plot ratios for entire city blocks rather than individual sites, a control that was mostly ignored.

In 1972, BHP House (now 140 William Street) became Melbourne's first building to surpass the height of 150 metres (490 ft), and thus was Melbourne's first "skyscraper". BHP House was the city's tallest for a few years, and remains one of the few heritage-registered skyscrapers in Melbourne. Slightly taller, the Optus Centre was completed in 1975, and then in 1977, Nauru House became the tallest building in Melbourne, at a height of 182 metres (597 ft). In 1978, what would be the first of two Collins Place towers, ANZ Tower, opened at a height of 188 metres (617 ft), becoming Melbourne's tallest building.

By the early 1980s, Melbourne had a total of 6 buildings above 150 metres (490 ft), with the completion of the Wentworth (later Regent then Sofitel) Hotel at Collins Place in 1980. In 1986, the Rialto Towers surpassed Sydney's MLC Centre as the tallest building in both Australia and the Southern Hemisphere, with a height of 251 metres (823 ft). At the time of its opening, it was the 25th-tallest building in the world. The 1990s brought Melbourne another 9 buildings over 150 metres (490 ft), 5 of which exceeded heights of 200 metres (660 ft). Specifically, 1991 saw the construction of the 260-metre-tall (850 ft) 101 Collins Street, which became the tallest building in Australia and the Southern Hemisphere; it was surpassed in height later that year with the completion of the nearby 120 Collins Street. The skyscraper, which stands at 266 metres (873 ft) in height, held the titles for tallest building in Australia and in the Southern Hemisphere for fourteen years, until the completion of the Gold Coast's Q1 in 2005.

=== 21st century ===
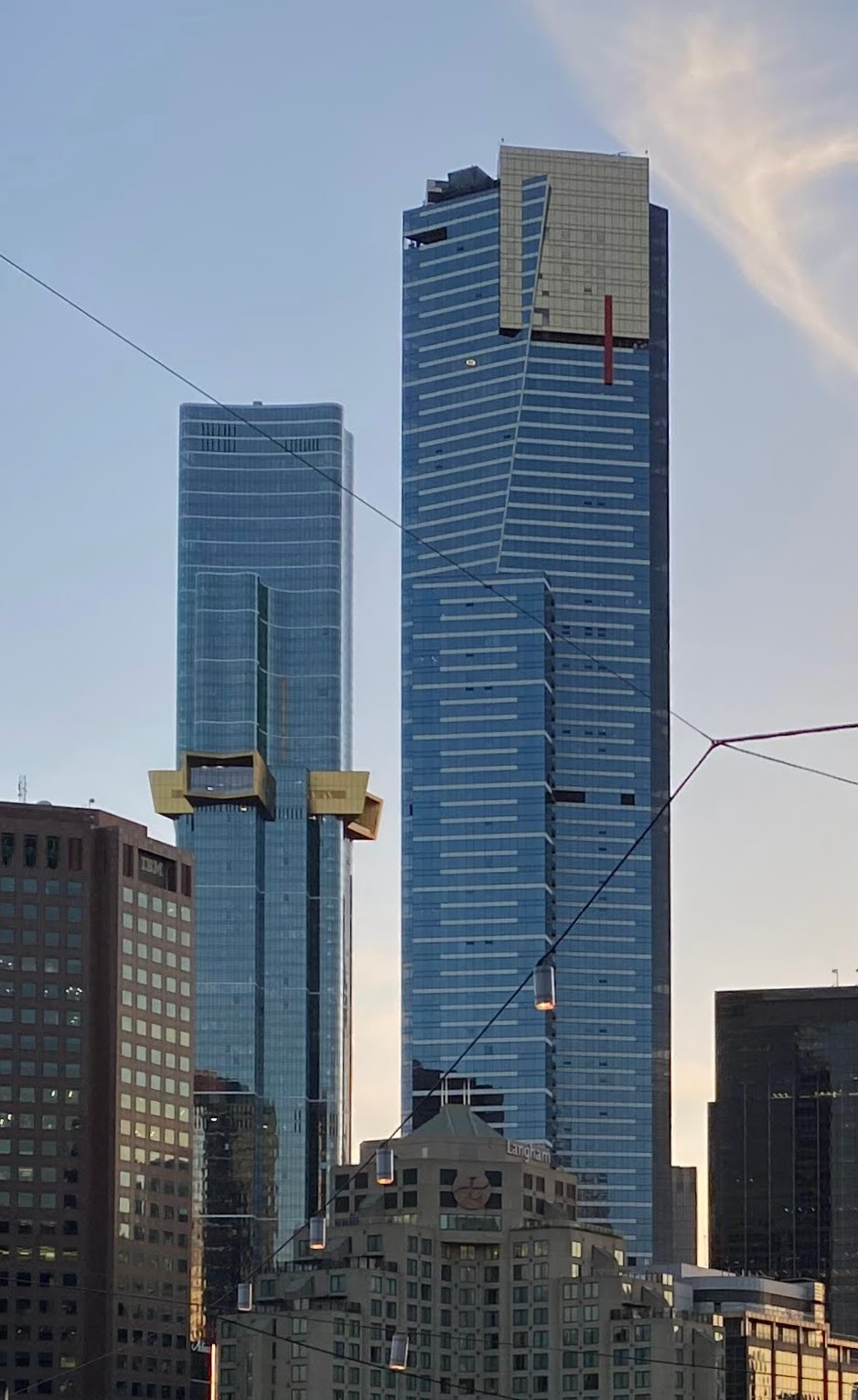
Melbourne's two tallest buildings, Australia 108 (left) and Eureka Tower (right), were constructed in 2020 and 2006, respectively.

During the 2000s, over 20 high-rise structures were completed, including the Eureka Tower (2006), which overtook 120 Collins Street as the tallest building in Melbourne and became the second-tallest in Australia (although tallest to its roof). Eureka Tower was also the tallest residential building in the world to roof, until surpassed by Ocean Heights, Dubai, in 2009. As of 2016, it is the 15th-tallest apartment building in the world.

Construction trends significantly increased throughout the 2010s, which included the completion of Prima Pearl (2014) and Aurora Melbourne Central (2019), both of which exceed 250 metres (820 ft) in height. Throughout the decade, the city experienced an "unprecedented" skyscraper construction boom, with 22 skyscrapers constructed between 2010 and 2019. This feat had been described as the "Manhattanization of Melbourne".

During this period, new towers in the CBD had average plot ratios of 37:1. In September 2015, the Minister for Planning, Richard Wynne, introduced a 12-month height limit of approximately 229 metres (751 ft) for all buildings proposed in the CBD and segments of Southbank, along with interim planning laws that re-introduced a floor area ratio of 18:1, which could be exceeded up to a maximum of 24:1 only with the provision of certain public benefits. Should projects exceed the plot ratio, developers will need to make a special case to the Minister, outlining the proposal's state significance. These controls were made permanent in September 2016. Buildings proposed prior to September 2015, such as Australia 108, which has a plot ratio of 46.6:1, were exempt from the new law.

The beginning of the 2020s saw the completion of Australia 108, which surpassed Eureka Tower as the tallest building in Melbourne and the tallest building in Australia to roof in 2020. It also became the Southern Hemisphere's first skyscraper to comprise at least 100 floors, and Melbourne's first building to be defined as a supertall skyscraper (buildings between the heights of 300 metres (980 ft) and 599 metres (1,965 ft)). In 2021, 12 skyscrapers were completed in the city – five more than the previous peak in 2020, and more than double the prior peaks in 2017, 2005 and 1991. Among the tallest built in 2021 were West Side Place Tower A and Queens Place North Tower, both of which exceed 250 metres (820 ft) in height.

The proliferation of skyscrapers in Australia over the past decades has also contributed to the city rivalry between Sydney and Melbourne. Whilst the first skyscraper in Australia was constructed in Sydney in 1967 (Australia Square), Melbourne has had the most skyscrapers in the country and within Oceania for over 35 years in total: from 1972 to 1989 (equal first with Sydney during 1972–74 and 1976–77), from 1991 to 1999, in 2006 (shared with Sydney) and again since 2015 (equal to Sydney 2015–16).

As of 2026, Melbourne comprises 31 skyscrapers (completed or topped out) that reach a height of at least 200 metres (660 ft) – more than any other city in Australia and Oceania. Of those, 23 are located in the CBD, 6 in Southbank and 1 in Carlton.

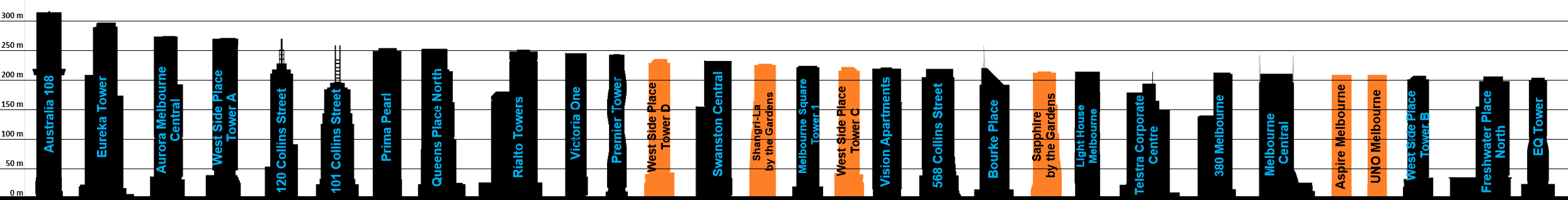
Buildings above 200 metres in height in Melbourne. Skyscrapers in black are complete, while skyscrapers coloured orange are in the construction phase, as of 2022.

=== Precincts ===
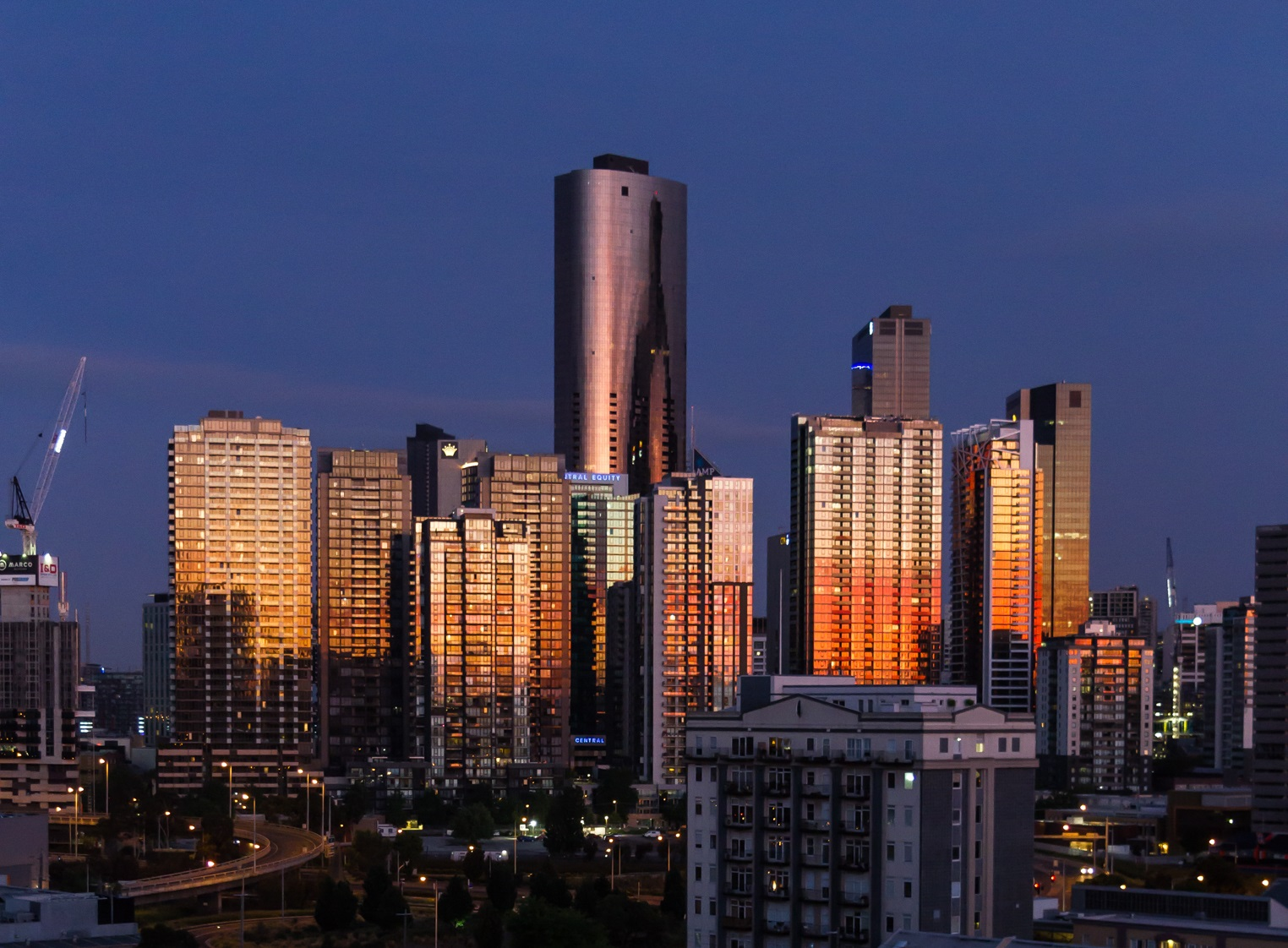
Since the 2000s, high-rise density has taken form in urban renewal regions like Southbank.

Skyscrapers in Melbourne by precinct
Precinct of Melbourne	C	TO	UC	OH	A
Carlton	1	0	0	0	0
CBD	57	2	2	1	4
Docklands	2	0	0	0	0
Port Melbourne	0	0	0	0	0
Southbank	16	0	3	0	10
South Melbourne	0	0	0	0	2
South Yarra	1	0	0	0	0
St Kilda Road	1	0	0	0	0
Total	78	2	5	1	16

The CBD skyline constitutes two distinct sections: the east and west, divided by Swanston Street. The tallest buildings on the eastern side of the skyline are 120 Collins Street and 101 Collins Street, whilst the tallest on the western side are West Side Place Tower A, Rialto Towers and Premier Tower.

Significant new skylines have emerged outside of the CBD, especially within the inner-city suburb of Southbank. This precinct, located adjacent to the CBD, includes some of the tallest buildings in Melbourne, such as Australia 108, Eureka Tower and Prima Pearl.

South Yarra, St Kilda Road (a locality adjacent to the CBD) and Carlton each contain one skyscraper. Other inner-city suburbs such as Port Melbourne, South Melbourne and Box Hill each have skyscrapers in proposed or approved stages of development.

=== Functions ===
Most of Melbourne's skyscrapers constructed by the 1990s were built for commercial purposes – specifically, used as offices, with 88% being designated as office space. Exceptions to this include the mixed-use building Sofitel Hotel (1980) on Collins Place, and the all-hotel Crown Towers (1997) in Southbank. Melbourne's first residential skyscrapers were constructed in 2005, with two built that year. By 2010, 72% of skyscrapers built in Melbourne were of commercial use, 12% residential, 12% mixed-use and 4% hotel. The trend towards residential skyscrapers has continued significantly; in 2015, 58% of skyscrapers within the city were of commercial use, 26% residential, 13% mixed-use and 3% hotel. These figures were set to change dramatically by 2020; when factoring the buildings that were still under construction (but to be completed by 2020), 44% of the city's skyscrapers were to be of residential use, 35% commercial, 18% mixed-use, 2% hotel and 2% government.

== Tallest buildings ==
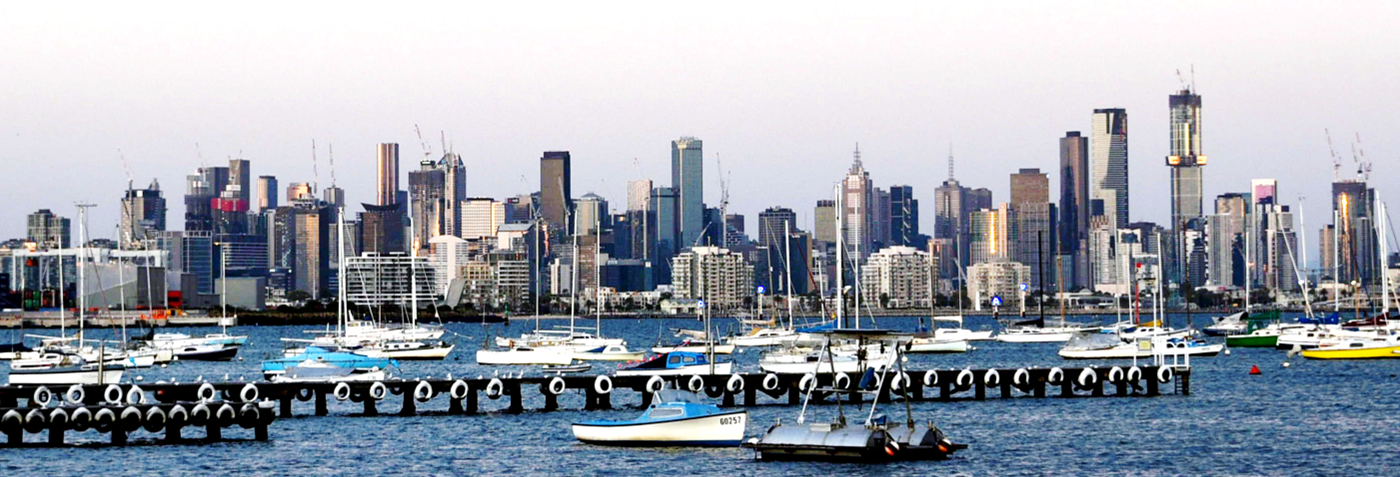
The skyline of Melbourne city as viewed from Williamstown in January 2020. Prominent skyscrapers visible in this image include West Side Place towers A and B (then under construction); far left: Aurora Melbourne Central, Premier Tower (then under construction), Bourke Place and 568 Collins Street; left of centre: the Rialto Towers; centre: 120 Collins Street, 101 Collins Street, Freshwater Place North, Prima Pearl, Eureka Tower, Australia 108 (then under construction) and Melbourne Square Tower 1 (then under construction).

=== Overall ===
As of 2026, Melbourne has 80 skyscrapers completed or topped out, comprising the 24th-tallest skyline in the world and tallest in Oceania. These skyscrapers are defined as standing at least 150 metres (490 ft) tall based on height measurement used by the Council on Vertical Urbanism. Such measurement includes spires and architectural details, but does not include antenna masts. An equal sign (=) following a rank indicates the same height between two or more buildings. An asterisk (*) indicates that the building is still under construction, but has topped out. The "built" column indicates the year in which a building was completed. Height: S = Spire, R = Roof.

Was Melbourne's tallest building when completed

Rank	Name (street address)	Image	Height		Total floors	Built	Purpose	Location	Notes
Rank	Name (street address)	Image	S	R	Total floors	Built	Purpose	Location	Notes
1	Australia 108 (70 Southbank Boulevard)		316.7 m (1,039 ft)		100	2020	Residential	Southbank; 37°49′23″S 144°57′50″E	2nd-tallest building in Australia as of 2026; tallest building in Australia to roof. First proposed in 2014, construction commenced in 2015. Completed in 2020. Tallest residential building in Australia to roof. First and only building in Melbourne to be designated as a "supertall" skyscraper. First and only skyscraper in the Southern Hemisphere to comprise at least 100 floors. Tallest building completed during the 2020s. Tallest building within the Southbank precinct of Melbourne. Recognised in 7th place for the 2020 Emporis Skyscraper Award.
2	Eureka Tower (7 Riverside Quay)		297.3 m (975 ft)		91	2006	Residential	Southbank; 37°49′18″S 144°57′52″E	3rd-tallest building in Australia as of 2026; 2nd-tallest building in Australia to roof. First proposed in 1999, construction commenced in 2001 and was completed in 2006, becoming the world's tallest residential tower when measured to its highest floor, until surpassed by Ocean Heights in Dubai in 2009, and the 35th-tallest building in the world overall. As of December 2016, it is the 15th-tallest residential building in the world. Tallest building in Australia to roof from 2006 to 2020. Tallest building completed during the 2000s. Recipient of the 2006 Bronze Emporis Skyscraper Award.
3	Aurora Melbourne Central (250 La Trobe Street)		270.5 m (887 ft)		85	2019	Mixed use (Note: Residential; serviced apartments)	CBD; 37°48′35.2″S 144°57′44.8″E	5th-tallest building in Australia as of 2026; 5th-tallest building in Australia to roof. First proposed in 2014, construction commenced in 2015. Completed in 2019. Tallest building completed during the 2010s. Tallest building in the CBD. Recognised in 5th place for the 2019 Emporis Skyscraper Award.
4	West Side Place Tower A (250 Spencer Street)		268.7 m (882 ft)		81	2021	Mixed use (Note: Residential; hotel)	CBD; 37°48′51.5″S 144°57′9.5″E	7th-tallest building in Australia as of 2026; 7th-tallest building in Australia to roof. First proposed in 2013, construction commenced in 2017. Completed in 2021. Tallest building of the West Side Place complex.
5	120 Collins Street		266.6 m (875 ft)	222.2 m (729 ft)	52	1991	Office	CBD; 37°48′51.2″S 144°58′10.9″E	8th-tallest building in Australia as of 2026. First proposed in 1986, construction commenced in 1989. Completed in 1991, it became the 27th-tallest building in the world and tallest in Australia, being the latter until the completion of Q1 on the Gold Coast, Queensland, in 2005. Tallest office building in Australia. Tallest building completed during the 1990s.
6	101 Collins Street		260 m (853 ft)	195 m (640 ft)	50	1991	Office	CBD; 37°48′54″S 144°58′14.8″E	12th-tallest building in Australia as of 2026. First proposed in 1987, construction commenced in 1988. Completed in 1991, it was the 33rd-tallest building in the world, and was briefly the tallest building in Australia until the completion of 120 Collins Street in 1991. Tied as the 2nd-tallest office building in Australia.
7	Prima Pearl (31–49 Queensbridge Square)		254 m (833 ft)		72	2014	Residential	Southbank; 37°49′22.6″S 144°57′41.0″E	14th-tallest building in Australia as of 2026; 12th-tallest building in Australia to roof. First proposed in 2004, construction commenced in 2012. Completed in 2014.
8	Queens Place North Tower (350 Queen Street)		252.8 m (829 ft)		79	2021	Residential	CBD; 37°48′36″S 144°57′33″E	16th-tallest building in Australia as of 2026. First proposed in 2015, construction commenced in 2018 before being completed in 2021.
9	Rialto Towers (525 Collins Street)		251.1 m (824 ft)		63	1986	Office	CBD; 37°49′7.4″S 144°57′26.9″E	17th-tallest building in Australia as of 2026. First proposed in 1981, construction commenced in 1982. Completed in 1986, it became the tallest building in Australia and the 25th-tallest in the world, until the former title was surpassed by 101 Collins Street in 1991. It remained the tallest building in Australia to roof, until the completion of Eureka Tower in 2006. Tallest building completed during the 1980s.
10	Victoria One (452 Elizabeth Street)		246.8 m (810 ft)		76	2018	Residential	CBD; 37°48′30.1″S 144°57′38.6″E	20th-tallest building in Australia as of November 2026; designed by Elenberg Fraser. First proposed in 2013, construction commenced in 2014. Completed in 2018.
11	Premier Tower (134–160 Spencer Street)		245.7 m (806 ft)		78	2021	Mixed use (Note: Residential; hotel)	CBD; 37°49′2.5″S 144°57′13.4″E	21st-tallest building in Australia as of November 2026; designed by Elenberg Fraser. First proposed in 2014, construction commenced in 2017, before topping out in 2020. Completed in 2021. Recognised in 7th place for the 2021 Emporis Skyscraper Award.
12	West Side Place Tower D (250 Spencer Street)		239 m (784 ft)		72	2023	Residential	CBD; 37°48′50.5″S 144°57′11.7″E	27th-tallest building in Australia as of November 2026. First proposed in 2013, construction commenced in 2020, before topping out in 2022. 2nd-tallest building of the West Side Place complex.
13	Swanston Central (168 Victoria Street)		236.7 m (777 ft)		71	2020	Mixed use (Note: Residential; retail)	Carlton; 37°48′16.7″S 144°56′42.4″E	29th-tallest building in Australia as of November 2026. First proposed in 2015, construction commenced in 2016. Completed in 2020. Tallest building within the Carlton precinct of Melbourne, and only building at or above 150 metres (490 ft) in height in this precinct.
14	Shangri-La by the Gardens (308 Exhibition Street)		231.7 m (760 ft)		59	TBA	Hotel	CBD; 37°48′29.9″S 144°58′9.6″E	32nd-tallest building in Australia as of November 2026; designed by Fender Katsalidis Architects. First proposed in 2016, construction commenced in 2019, before topping out in 2022. Shangri-La by the Gardens on hold as of November 2026, with interior yet to be completed. If completed in 2023 (as was planned), it would have become the tallest all-hotel building in Australia, surpassing the Jewel Hotel on the Gold Coast. Taller tower of the 308 Exhibition Street development.
15	Melbourne Square Tower 1 (93–119 Kavanagh Street)		231 m (758 ft)		70	2021	Residential	Southbank; 37°49′33.5″S 144°57′48.4″E	33rd-tallest building in Australia as of November 2026; designed by Cox Architecture. First proposed in 2017, construction commenced in 2018, before topping out in 2020. Completed in 2021. Tallest building of the Melbourne Square complex.
16	West Side Place Tower C (250 Spencer Street)		230 m (755 ft)		70	2023	Residential	CBD; 37°48′52.1″S 144°57′12.5″E	Equal 34th-tallest building in Australia as of November 2026. First proposed in 2013, construction commenced in 2020, before topping out in 2022. 3rd-tallest building of the West Side Place complex.
17	Vision Apartments (500 Elizabeth Street)		229 m (751 ft)		70	2016	Residential	CBD; 37°48′26″S 144°57′36.8″E	37th-tallest building in Australia as of November 2026. First proposed in 2011, construction commenced in 2013. Completed in 2016.
18 =	568 Collins Street		224 m (735 ft)		68	2015	Mixed use (Note: Residential; office; retail)	CBD; 37°49′6.1″S 144°57′19.6″E	Equal 41st-tallest building in Australia as of November 2026. First proposed in 2011, construction commenced in 2012. Completed in 2015.
18 =	Bourke Place (600 Bourke Street)		224 m (735 ft)		49	1991	Office	CBD; 37°48′57″S 144°57′21.7″E	Equal 41st-tallest building in Australia as of November 2026. Upon completion in 1991, it was the 89th-tallest building in the world. A communications mast sits atop the building, bringing its total height to tip to 254 metres (833 feet).
20	380 Melbourne (380 Lonsdale Street)		221.2 m (726 ft)		67	2021	Mixed use (Note: Residential; hotel)	CBD; 37°48′44.79″S 144°57′40.2″E	45th-tallest building in Australia as of November 2026; designed by Elenberg Fraser. First proposed in 2014, construction commenced in 2018, before topping out in 2020. Completed in 2021.
21	Sapphire by the Gardens (308 Exhibition Street)		218.8 m (718 ft)		57	2022	Residential	CBD; 37°48′29.4″S 144°58′11.2″E	48th-tallest building in Australia as of November 2026; designed by Fender Katsalidis Architects. First proposed in 2016, construction commenced in 2019. Completed in 2022. Shorter tower of the 308 Exhibition Street development.
22 =	Light House Melbourne (450 Elizabeth Street)		218 m (715 ft)		69	2017	Residential	CBD; 37°48′30.1″S 144°57′38.6″E	Equal 50th-tallest building in Australia as of November 2026; designed by Elenberg Fraser. First proposed in 2013, construction commenced in 2015. Completed in 2017.
22 =	Telstra Corporate Centre (242 Exhibition Street)		218 m (715 ft)	193 m (633 ft)	47	1992	Office	CBD; 37°48′34.1″S 144°58′10.9″E	Equal 50th-tallest building in Australia as of November 2026.
24	435 Bourke Street		214.9 m (705 ft)		55	2026	Office	CBD; 37°48′54″S 144°57′40.3″E	56th-tallest building in Australia as of November 2026. Designed by Bates Smart. First proposed in 2019, construction commenced in 2022, before topping out in 2026. Set for completion in 2026.
25	Melbourne Central (350 Elizabeth Street)		211 m (692 ft)		53	1991	Office	CBD; 37°48′39.2″S 144°57′43.2″E	57th-tallest building in Australia as of November 2026. Construction commenced in 1989. Completed in 1991. Twin communications masts sit atop the building, bringing its total height to tip to 246 metres (807 feet).
26	Aspire Melbourne (299 King Street)		210.6 m (691 ft)		65	2023	Residential	CBD; 37°48′48.2″S 144°57′14.4″E	58th-tallest building in Australia as of November 2026. First proposed in 2014, construction commenced in 2020, before topping out in 2022.
27	UNO Melbourne (111 A'Beckett Street)		210 m (689 ft)		65	2023	Residential	CBD; 37°48′34.7″S 144°57′36.5″E	60th-tallest building in Australia as of November 2026. First proposed in 2015, construction began in 2020.
28	The Queensbridge Building (84-88 Queensbridge Street)		209 m (686 ft)		66	2025	Residential	Southbank; 37°49′29.8″S 144°57′35.9″E	61st-tallest building in Australia as of November 2026. First proposed in 2021, construction began in 2022.
29	West Side Place Tower B (250 Spencer Street)		206 m (676 ft)		65	2021	Mixed use (Note: Residential; hotel)	CBD; 37°48′51.5″S 144°57′8.9″E	63rd-tallest building in Australia as of November 2026. First proposed in 2013, construction commenced in 2017, before topping out in 2020. Completed in 2021. 4th-tallest building of the West Side Place complex.
30	Freshwater Place North (1 Queensbridge Square)		205 m (673 ft)		63	2005	Residential	Southbank; 37°49′18.7″S 144°57′41.5″E	64th-tallest building in Australia as of November 2026. Construction commenced in 2002. Completed in 2005.
31	Eq. Tower (127–141 A'Beckett Street)		202 m (663 ft)		63	2017	Residential	CBD; 37°48′35.1″S 144°57′34.8″E	65th-tallest building in Australia as of November 2026. Designed by Elenberg Fraser. First proposed in 2014, construction commenced in 2015, before completion in 2017.
32	Empire Melbourne (398 Elizabeth Street)		198.4 m (651 ft)		62	2017	Mixed use (Note: Residential; retail)	CBD; 37°48′33.8″S 144°57′40.3″E	Designed by Hayball Architecture. First proposed in 2014, construction commenced in 2015. Completed in 2017.
33 =	Home Southbank (258 City Road)		198 m (650 ft)		60	2022	Residential	Southbank; 37°49′18.7″S 144°57′57.1″E	First proposed in 2013, construction commenced in 2019. Completed in 2022.
33 =	Melbourne Grand (556–558 Lonsdale Street)		198 m (650 ft)		57	2020	Residential	CBD; 37°48′50.5″S 144°57′21.1″E	Designed by Central Equity. First proposed in 2015, construction commenced in 2018. Completed in 2020.
35	405 Bourke Street		194.9 m (639 ft)		43	2021	Office	CBD; 37°48′54″S 144°57′43″E	First proposed in 2009, construction commenced in 2018. Completed in 2021.
36	Collins House (466 Collins Street)		190 m (623 ft)		59	2019	Residential	CBD; 37°49′3.25″S 144°57′31.1″E	Designed by Bates Smart. First proposed in 2013, construction commenced in 2017. Completed in 2019. Recipient of an "Award of Excellence" for the 2021 CTBUH Skyscraper Awards in the category "Construction".
37	80 Collins South (80 Collins Street)		188.4 m (618 ft)		41	2020	Office	CBD; 37°48′50.6″S 144°58′14.7″E	First proposed in 2016, construction commenced in 2017. Completed in 2020. Recipient of an "Award of Excellence" for the 2021 CTBUH Skyscraper Awards in the category "Structural Engineering".
38 =	Meriton Suites (140 King Street)		188 m (617 ft)		58	2023	Residential	CBD; 37°49′0.3″S 144°57′22.2″E	First proposed in 2015, construction began in 2020.
38 =	Sofitel Hotel at Collins Place (35 Collins Street)		188 m (617 ft)		50	1980	Mixed use (Note: Office; hotel)	CBD; 37°48′50″S 144°58′22.9″E	Construction commenced in 1978 before completion in 1980. It was the city's tallest building (at equal place with ANZ Tower at Collins Place) until surpassed by the Rialto Towers in 1986.
38 =	ANZ Tower at Collins Place (55 Collins Street)		188 m (617 ft)		46	1978	Office	CBD; 37°48′51.6″S 144°58′20.6″E	First proposed in 1970, construction commenced in 1973, before completion in 1978. It became the city's tallest building and the 93rd-tallest building in the world, with the former title equalled with the Sofitel Hotel (also at Collins Place) in 1980. Tallest building completed during the 1970s.
41	Abode318 (312–318 Russell Street)		187.3 m (615 ft)		57	2015	Residential	CBD; 37°48′33.2″S 144°58′0.3″E	Designed by Elenberg Fraser. First proposed in 2007, construction commenced in 2011. Completed in 2015. Recognised in 5th place for the 2015 Emporis Skyscraper Award.
42	Nauru House (80 Collins Street)		182 m (597 ft)		54	1977	Office	CBD; 37°48′50.6″S 144°58′14.7″E	Completed in 1977, it briefly became the city's tallest building, and was surpassed in height by the ANZ Tower at Collins Place in 1978. Also known as 80 Collins Street.
43	Victoria Police Centre Tower 2 (311 Spencer Street)		180 m (591 ft)		40	2020	Office	Docklands; 37°49′4.8″S 144°57′12.9″E	Construction commenced in 2017. Completed in 2020. Tallest building within the Dockalnds precinct of Melbourne.
44	Melbourne Square Tower 2 (93–119 Kavanagh Street)		179 m (587 ft)		59	2021	Mixed use (Note: Residential; hotel)	Southbank; 37°49′33.3″S 144°57′50.4″E	Designed by Cox Architecture. First proposed in 2014, construction commenced in 2018, before topping out in 2020. Completed in 2021. Currently 2nd-tallest building of the Melbourne Square complex.
45	Capitol Grand (241 Toorak Road)		178 m (584 ft)		50	2019	Residential	South Yarra; 37°50′21.3″S 144°59′42.7″E	First proposed in 2011, construction commenced in 2017; having topped out in 2019, the project was completed in late 2019. Tallest building within the South Yarra precinct of Melbourne, and only building to reach a height of 150 metres (490 ft) in this precinct.
46	Scape on Franklin (97 Franklin Street)		175 m (574 ft)		55	2021	Mixed use (Note: Residential; office)	CBD; 37°48′29″S 144°57′40″E	First proposed in 2014, construction commenced in 2018. Completed in 2021.
47	MY80 (410 Elizabeth Street)		173 m (568 ft)		55	2014	Residential	CBD; 37°48′32.3″S 144°57′39.6″E	Designed by Hayball Architecture. First proposed in 2010, construction commenced in 2011. Completed in 2014.
48	Avant (54 A'Beckett Street)		172 m (564 ft)		55	2018	Residential	CBD; 37°48′31.8″S 144°57′41.9″E	Designed by Elenberg Fraser. First proposed in 2015, construction commenced in 2016. Completed in 2018.
49	Upper West Side Tower 5 (33 Rose Lane)		170 m (558 ft)		53	2016	Residential	CBD; 37°48′53.6″S 144°57′14.1″E	Tallest building of the Upper West Side complex. Building also referred to as "Manhattan". First proposed in 2011, construction commenced in 2013. Completed in 2016.
50	385 Bourke Street		169 m (554 ft)		43	1983	Office	CBD; 37°48′53.1″S 144°57′46.3″E	Designed by Norman Disney & Young
51	Olderfleet (477 Collins Street)		168 m (551 ft)		40	2020	Office	CBD; 37°49′5″S 144°57′30″E	First proposed in 2015, construction commenced in 2017. Completed in 2020. Designed by Grimshaw Architects. Recipient of two "Awards of Excellence" for the 2022 CTBUH Skyscraper Awards in the categories "Best Tall Building 100-199 meters" and "Best Tall Office Building".
52	Zen Apartments (27 Therry Street)		167.8 m (551 ft)		50	2012	Residential	CBD; 37°48′25″S 144°57′39.8″E	Designed by Urban Design Architects. First proposed in 2008, construction commenced in 2009,. Completed in 2012.
53 =	Platinum Tower One (245–263 City Road)		167 m (548 ft)		52	2016	Residential	Southbank; 37°49′36.5″S 144°57′33.9″E	Designed by Squillace. First proposed in 2011, construction commenced in 2014. Completed in 2016.
53 =	530 Collins Street		167 m (548 ft)		40	1991	Office	CBD; 37°49′4″S 144°57′24.4″E	Designed by Peddle Thorp Architects
55 =	Southbank Place (54–68 Kavanagh Street)		166 m (545 ft)		52	2019	Residential	Southbank; 37°49′27.5″S 144°57′49.4″E	Construction commenced in 2016; having topped out in late 2018, the project was completed in 2019. Designed by Guildford Bell & Graham Fisher.
55 =	Focus Melbourne (71–87 City Road)		166 m (545 ft)		50	2022	Residential	Southbank; 37°49′20″S 144°57′55.8″E	First proposed in 2015, construction commenced in 2020, before topping out in 2022. Completed in 2022.
55 =	Casselden Place (2 Lonsdale Street)		166 m (545 ft)		43	1992	Office	CBD; 37°48′33.5″S 144°58′17.6″E	Designed by HASSELL
58	The Fifth (605–613 Lonsdale Street)		165.5 m (543 ft)		51	2017	Residential	CBD; 37°48′56″S 144°57′11″E	2nd-tallest building of the Upper West Side complex. First proposed in 2014, construction commenced in 2015. Completed in 2017.
59	Ernst & Young Tower (8 Exhibition Street)		164.7 m (540 ft)		40	2005	Mixed use (Note: Residential; office)	CBD; 37°48′55.4″S 144°58′22″E	Designed by Denton Corker Marshall. First proposed in 2001, construction commenced in 2003. Completed in 2005.
60	35 Spring Street		164.4 m (539 ft)		44	2017	Residential	CBD; 37°48′51″S 144°58′26.5″E	First proposed in 2013, construction commenced in 2014. Completed in 2017.
61	Paragon (318 Queen Street)		163.1 m (535 ft)		48	2021	Residential	CBD; 37°48′40.7″S 144°57′33.5″E	First proposed in 2017, construction commenced in 2018. Completed in 2021.
62	SX Stage 1 (121 Exhibition Street)		163 m (535 ft)		40	2005	Office	CBD; 37°48′45.4″S 144°58′13.2″E	Designed by Woods Bagot Melbourne. Construction commenced in 2003, before completing in 2005.
63	Royal Domain Tower (368 St Kilda Road)		162 m (531 ft)		46	2005	Residential	St Kilda Road; 37°49′54.2″S 144°58′16.3″E	Construction commenced in 2003, before completing in 2005. Designed by Meinhardt Group. Tallest building within the St Kilda Road precinct of Melbourne, and only building to reach a height of 150 metres (490 ft) in this precinct.
64	100 Queen Street (former ANZ World Headquarters)		161.2 m (529 ft)		37	1993	Office	CBD; 37°48′59.7″S 144°57′42.3″E	Designed by Peddle Thorp Architects
65 =	Unilodge Place (478–488 Elizabeth Street)		161 m (528 ft)		52	2021	Residential	CBD; 37°48′28″S 144°57′38″E	Construction began in 2019. Completed in 2021.
65 =	National Bank House (500 Bourke Street)		161 m (528 ft)		40	1978	Office	CBD; 37°48′54.4″S 144°57′31.6″E	In 2009, the building was fully refurbished by then owner ISPT in order to increase energy efficiency to 5 stars.
67	2 Southbank Boulevard		160.8 m (528 ft)		40	2005	Office	Southbank; 37°49′17.5″S 144°57′44.8″E	Designed by Bates Smart. Construction commenced in 2002. Completed in 2005.
68	Verve 501 Swanston Tower (501 Swanston Street)		159 m (522 ft)		45	2006	Mixed use (Note: Residential; retail)	CBD; 37°48′24.8″S 144°57′42.4″E	Designed by Urban Design Architects. Construction commenced in 2004. Completed in 2006.
69	Wesley Place (130 Lonsdale Street)		156.5 m (513 ft)		35	2020	Office	CBD; 37°48′42.6″S 144°57′48.9″E	First proposed in 2016, construction commenced in 2017. Completed in 2020. Designed by Cox Architecture. Recipient of three "Awards of Excellence" for the 2022 CTBUH Skyscraper Awards in the categories "Best Tall Building 100-199 meters", "Best Tall Office Building" and "Urban Habitat – District/Master Plan Scale".
70 =	Upper West Side Tower 2 (Lonsdale Street)		156 m (512 ft)		50	2014	Residential	CBD; 37°48′54.5″S 144°57′14″E	3rd-tallest building of the Upper West Side complex. Building also referred to as "Madison". Construction commenced in 2011. Completed in 2014.
70 =	Palladium Tower (251 City Road)		156 m (512 ft)		47	2020	Residential	Southbank; 37°49′20.0″S 144°57′52.7″E	First proposed in 2017, construction commenced in 2018. Completed in 2020.
72	Melbourne Quarter Tower (685–695 Collins Street)		155.2 m (509 ft)		34	2024	Office	Docklands; 37°49′11.2″S 144°57′08.9″E	First proposed in 2015, construction started in 2018 and was finished in 2024.
73	183–189 A'Beckett Street		154 m (505 ft)		48	2021	Residential	CBD; 37°48′47″S 144°57′29″E	First proposed in 2015, construction commenced in 2019. Completed in 2021.
74 =	Shadow Play (105 Clarendon Street)		153 m (502 ft)		52	2018	Residential	Southbank; 37°49′37.5″S 144°57′29.2″E	First proposed in 2015, construction commenced in 2015. Completed in 2018.
74 =	Southbank Central (1–11 Balston Street)		153 m (502 ft)		48	2017	Residential	Southbank; 37°49′30.6″S 144°57′41.1″E	First proposed in 2014, construction commenced in 2015. Completed in 2017.
74 =	Optus Centre (367 Collins Street)		153 m (502 ft)		34	1975	Office	CBD; 37°49′1.8″S 144°57′44.7″E	Completed in 1975, it became the city's tallest building, until surpassed by Nauru House in 1977.
77 =	Crown Towers (8 Whiteman Street)		152.5 m (500 ft)		43	1997	Hotel	Southbank; 37°49′20.4″S 144°57′37.3″E	Tallest of three Crown hotels in Melbourne. Upon completion in 1997, it was the tallest all-hotel building in Australia, a record it held until the completion of the Jewel Hotel on the Gold Coast in 2019. Designed by Hudson Conway Architects and Daryl Jackson.
77 =	140 William Street		152.5 m (500 ft)		41	1972	Office	CBD; 37°48′57″S 144°57′31.8″E	Construction commenced in 1969; completed in 1972, it was the city's tallest building until surpassed in height by Optus Centre in 1975 by 50 centimetres (20 in). Recipient of the RVIA Victorian Architects award in 1975.
79	555 Collins Street		152 m (499 ft)		35	2023	Office	CBD; 37°49′7.29″S 144°57′22.6″E	Construction began in 2020.
80	Urban Workshop Lonsdale (50 Lonsdale Street)		150 m (492 ft)		34	2005	Office	CBD; 37°48′33.4″S 144°58′14.4″E	Designed by Hassell, John Wardle Architects and B+N Group

=== Tallest buildings by precinct ===
This lists the tallest building in each precinct of Melbourne based on standard height measurement.

Rank		Name	Height	Floors	Precinct of Melbourne	Completion
	List	Name	Height	Floors	Precinct of Melbourne	Completion
1	1	Australia 108	316.7 m (1,039 ft)	100	Southbank	2020
2	3	Aurora Melbourne Central	270.5 m (887 ft)	85	CBD	2019
3	13	Swanston Central	236.7 m (777 ft)	71	Carlton	2020
4	42	Victoria Police Centre Tower 2	180 m (591 ft)	40	Docklands	2020
5	44	Capitol Grand	178 m (584 ft)	52	South Yarra	2019
6	62	Royal Domain Tower	162 m (531 ft)	43	St Kilda Road	2005
7	–	Fifty Albert	98.1 m (322 ft)	30	South Melbourne	2013

=== Tallest buildings by function ===
This lists the tallest buildings in Melbourne by their respective functions – office, hotel, residential and mixed-use – based on standard height measurement.

Rank		Name	Height	Floors	Function	Completion
	List	Name	Height	Floors	Function	Completion
1	1	Australia 108	316.7 m (1,039 ft)	100	Residential	2020
3	3	Aurora Melbourne Central	270.5 m (887 ft)	85	Mixed use	2019
2	5	120 Collins Street	266.6 m (875 ft)	52	Office	1991
4	76 (=)	Crown Towers	152.5 m (500 ft)	43	Hotel	1997

=== Tallest buildings per decade ===
This section lists the ten tallest buildings in Melbourne at the start of every decade beginning with 1990. By 1980, all buildings within the top-10 listing reached over a height of 100 metres (330 ft); by 1995, the threshold had increased to 150 metres (490 ft); and again by 2015, to 200 metres (660 ft).

1990
Rank	Building	Height	Built	Diagram
1	Rialto Towers	251.1 m (824 ft)	1986	
2	Wentworth Hotel	188 m (617 ft)	1980	
2	ANZ Tower	188 m (617 ft)	1978	
4	Nauru House	182 m (597 ft)	1977	
5	385 Bourke Street	169 m (554 ft)	1983	
6	National Bank House	161 m (528 ft)	1978	
7	Optus Centre	153 m (502 ft)	1975	
8	140 William Street	152.5 m (500 ft)	1972	
9	360 Collins Street	142 m (466 ft)	1978	
10	1 Spring Street	132 m (433 ft)	1988	
2000
Rank	Building	Height	Built	Diagram
1	120 Collins Street	266.6 m (875 ft)	1991	
2	101 Collins Street	260 m (850 ft)	1991	
3	Rialto Towers	251.1 m (824 ft)	1986	
4	Bourke Place	224 m (735 ft)	1991	
5	Telstra Corporate Centre	218 m (715 ft)	1992	
6	Melbourne Central	211 m (692 ft)	1991	
7	Sofitel Hotel	188 m (617 ft)	1980	
7	ANZ Tower	188 m (617 ft)	1978	
9	Nauru House	182 m (597 ft)	1977	
10	385 Bourke Street	169 m (554 ft)	1983	
2010
Rank	Building	Height	Built	Diagram
1	Eureka Tower	297.3 m (975 ft)	2006	
2	120 Collins Street	266.6 m (875 ft)	1991	
3	101 Collins Street	260 m (850 ft)	1991	
4	Rialto Towers	251.1 m (824 ft)	1986	
5	Bourke Place	224 m (735 ft)	1991	
6	Telstra Corporate Centre	218 m (715 ft)	1992	
7	Melbourne Central	211 m (692 ft)	1991	
8	Freshwater Place North	205 m (673 ft)	2005	
9	Wentworth Hotel	188 m (617 ft)	1980	
9	ANZ Tower	188 m (617 ft)	1978	
2020
Rank	Building	Height	Built	Diagram
1	Australia 108	316.7 m (1,039 ft)	2019	
2	Eureka Tower	297.3 m (975 ft)	2006	
3	Aurora Melbourne Central	270.5 m (887 ft)	2019	
4	120 Collins Street	266.6 m (875 ft)	1991	
5	101 Collins Street	260 m (850 ft)	1991	
6	Prima Pearl	254 m (833 ft)	2014	
7	Rialto Towers	251 m (823 ft)	1986	
8	Victoria One	246.8 m (810 ft)	2018	
9	Premier Tower	245.9 m (807 ft)	2020	
10	Swanston Central	236.7 m (777 ft)	2020	

== Skylines ==
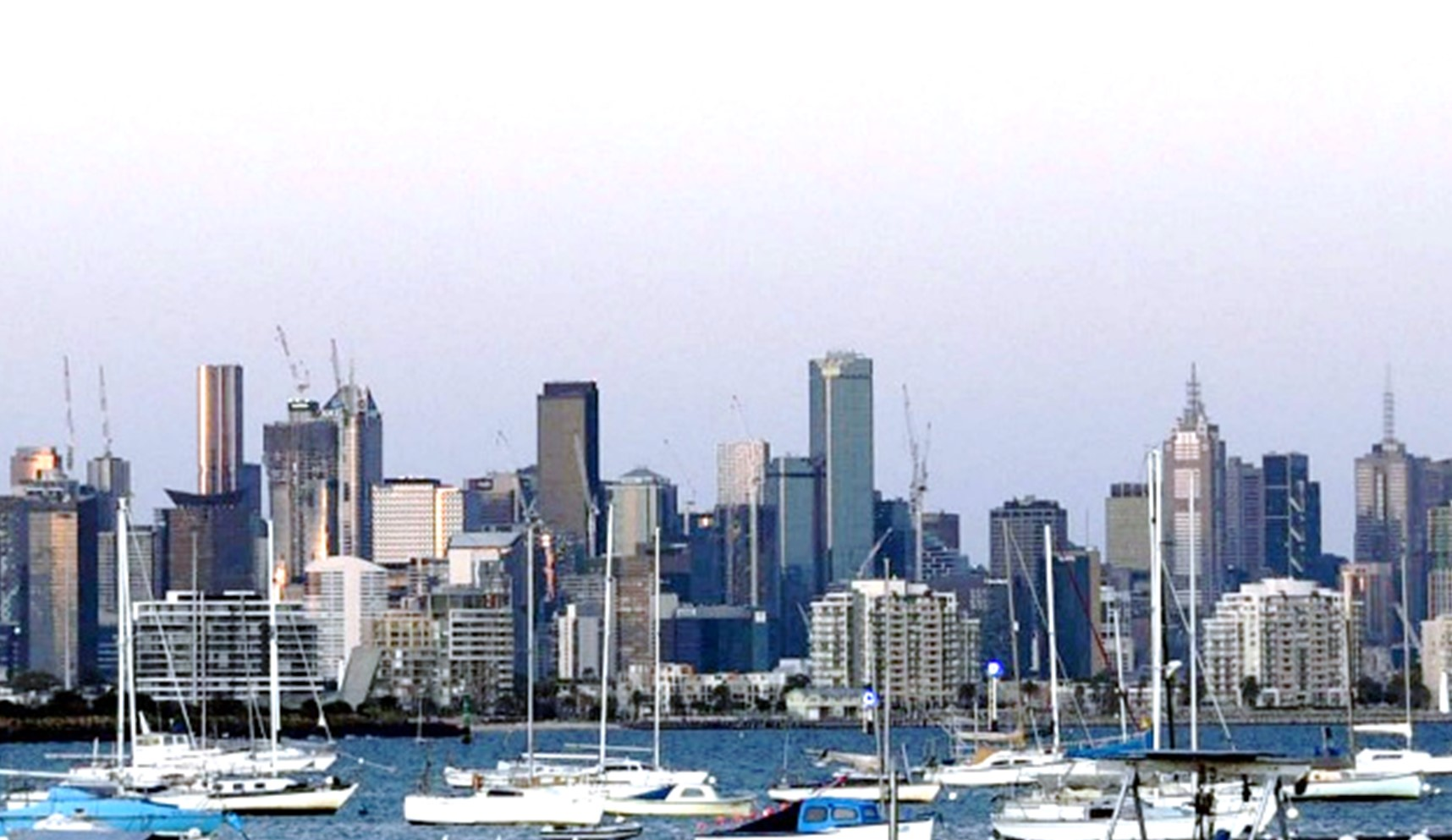
Melbourne central business district
57 skyscrapers completed (Note: Aurora Melbourne Central (270.5 m) · West Side Place Tower A (268.7 m) · 120 Collins Street (266.6 m) · 101 Collins Street (260 m) · Queens Place North Tower (252.8 m) · Rialto Towers (251.1 m) · Victoria One (246.8 m) · Premier Tower (245.9 m) · West Side Place Tower D (239 m) · West Side Place Tower C (230 m) · Vision Apartments (229 m) · 568 Collins Street (224 m) · Bourke Place (224 m) · Sapphire by the Gardens (218.8 m) · Light House Melbourne (218 m) · Telstra Corporate Building (218 m) · 380 Lonsdale Street (217.5 m) · West Side Place Tower B (211 m) · Melbourne Central (211 m) · Aspire Melbourne (210.6 m) · UNO Melbourne (210 m) · Eq. Tower (202 m) · Empire Melbourne (198.4 m) · Melbourne Grand (198 m) · Collins House (190 m) · 80 Collins South (188.4 m) · Sofitel Hotel – Collins Place (188 m) · ANZ Tower – Collins Place (188 m) · Meriton Suites (188 m) · Abode318 (187.3 m) · 80 Collins Street (182 m) · Scape on Franklin (175 m) · MY80 (173 m) · 405 Bourke Street (173 m) · Avant (172 m) · Upper West Side Tower 5 (170 m) · 385 Bourke Street (169 m) · Olderfleet (168m) · Zen Apartments (167.8 m) · 530 Collins Street (167 m) · Casselden Place (167 m) · The Fifth (165.5 m) · Ernst & Young Tower (164.7 m) · 35 Spring Street (164.4 m) · SX Stage 1 (163 m) · ANZ World Headquarters (162 m) · Unilodge Place (161 m) · National Bank House (161 m) · Verve 501 Swanston Tower (159 m) · Wesley Place (156.5 m) · Upper West Side Tower 2 (156 m) · Paragon (155 m) · 183-189 A’Beckett Street (154 m) · Optus Centre (153 m) · 140 William Street (152.5 m) · 555 Collins Street (152 m) · Urban Workshop Lonsdale (150 m))
2 skyscrapers under construction (Note: Atlas (242 m) · 32 Flinders Street (158.5 m))
1 skyscraper on hold (Note: 600 Collins Street (182 m))
2 skyscrapers topped out (Note: Shangri-La by the Gardens (231.7 m) · 435 Bourke Street (214.9 m))

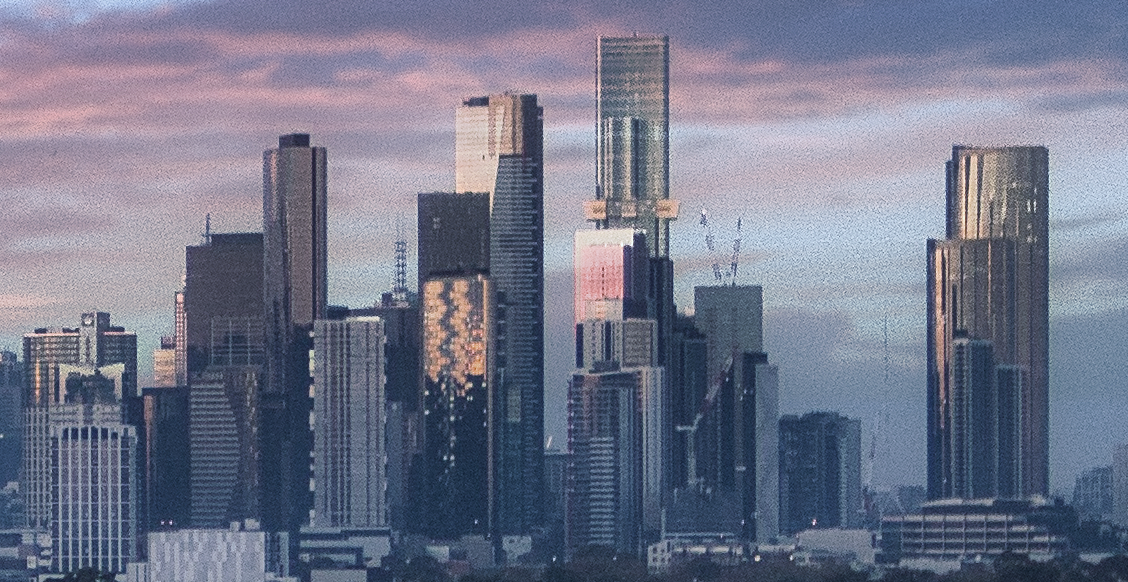
Southbank
16 skyscrapers completed (Note: Australia 108 (316.7 m) · Eureka Tower (297.3 m) · Prima Pearl (254 m) · Melbourne Square Tower 1 (231 m) · Freshwater Place North (205 m) · Home Southbank (198 m) · Melbourne Square Tower 2 (179 m) · Platinum Tower One (167 m) · Focus Melbourne (166 m) · Southbank Place (166 m) · 2 Southbank Boulevard (160. 8 m) · Palladium Tower (156 m) · Shadow Play (153 m) · Southbank Central (153 m) · Crown Towers (152.5 m))
3 skyscrapers under construction (Note: BLVD (244 m) · Aura (222 m) · Moray House (180 m))

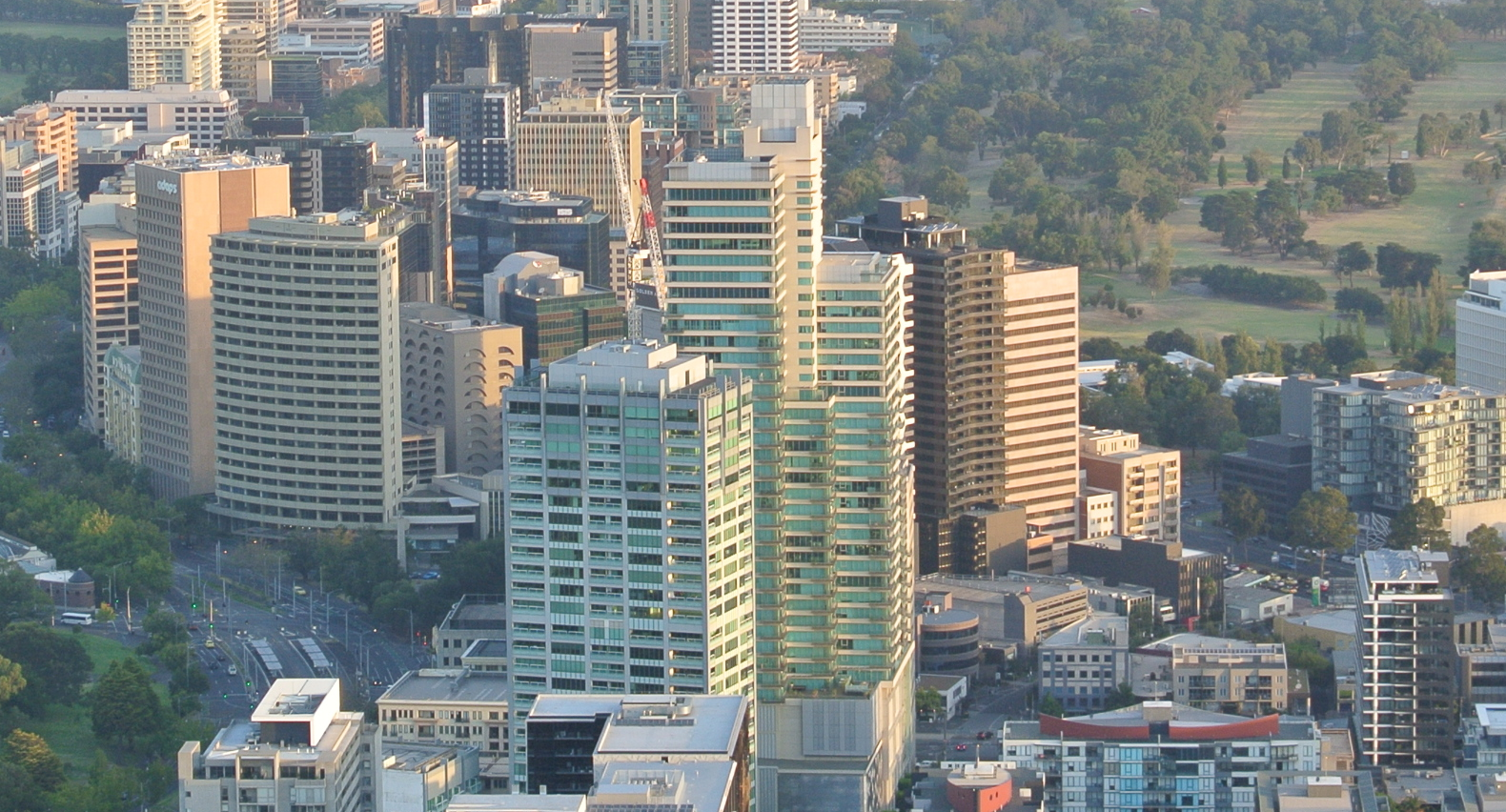
St Kilda Road
1 skyscraper completed (Note: Royal Domain Tower (162 m))

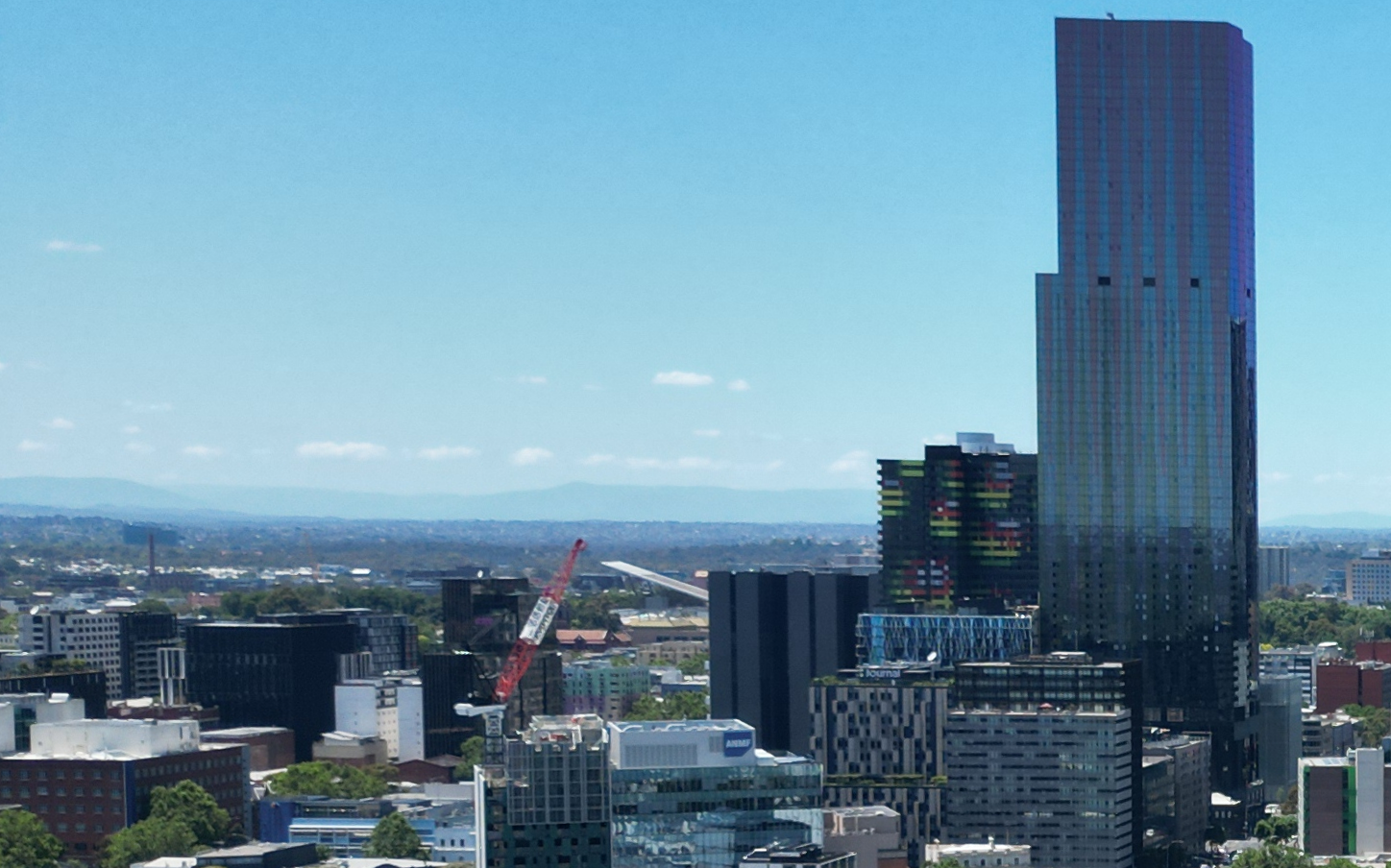
Carlton
1 skyscraper completed (Note: Swanston Central (236.7 m))

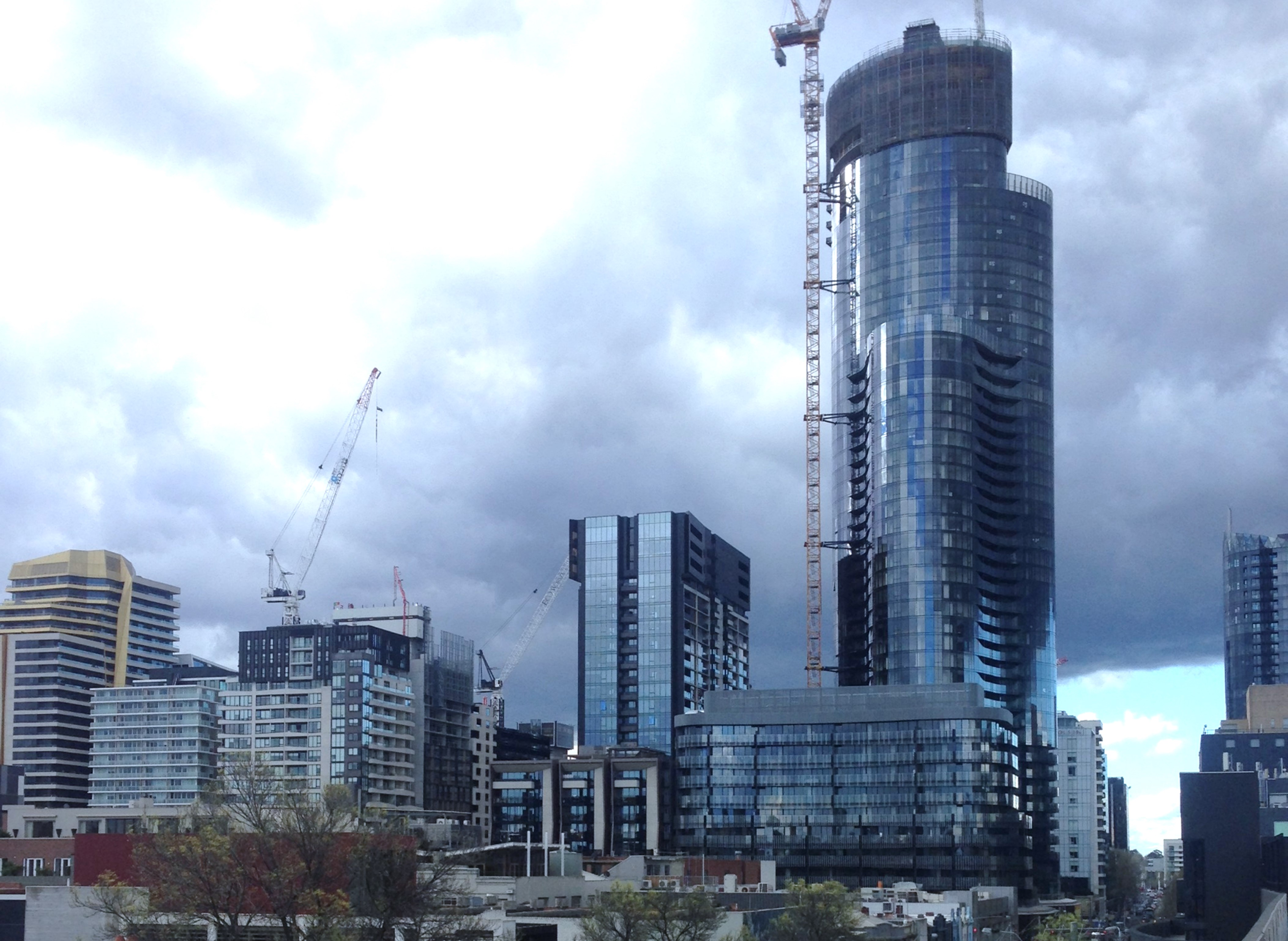
South Yarra
1 skyscraper completed (Note: Chapel Tower (178 m))

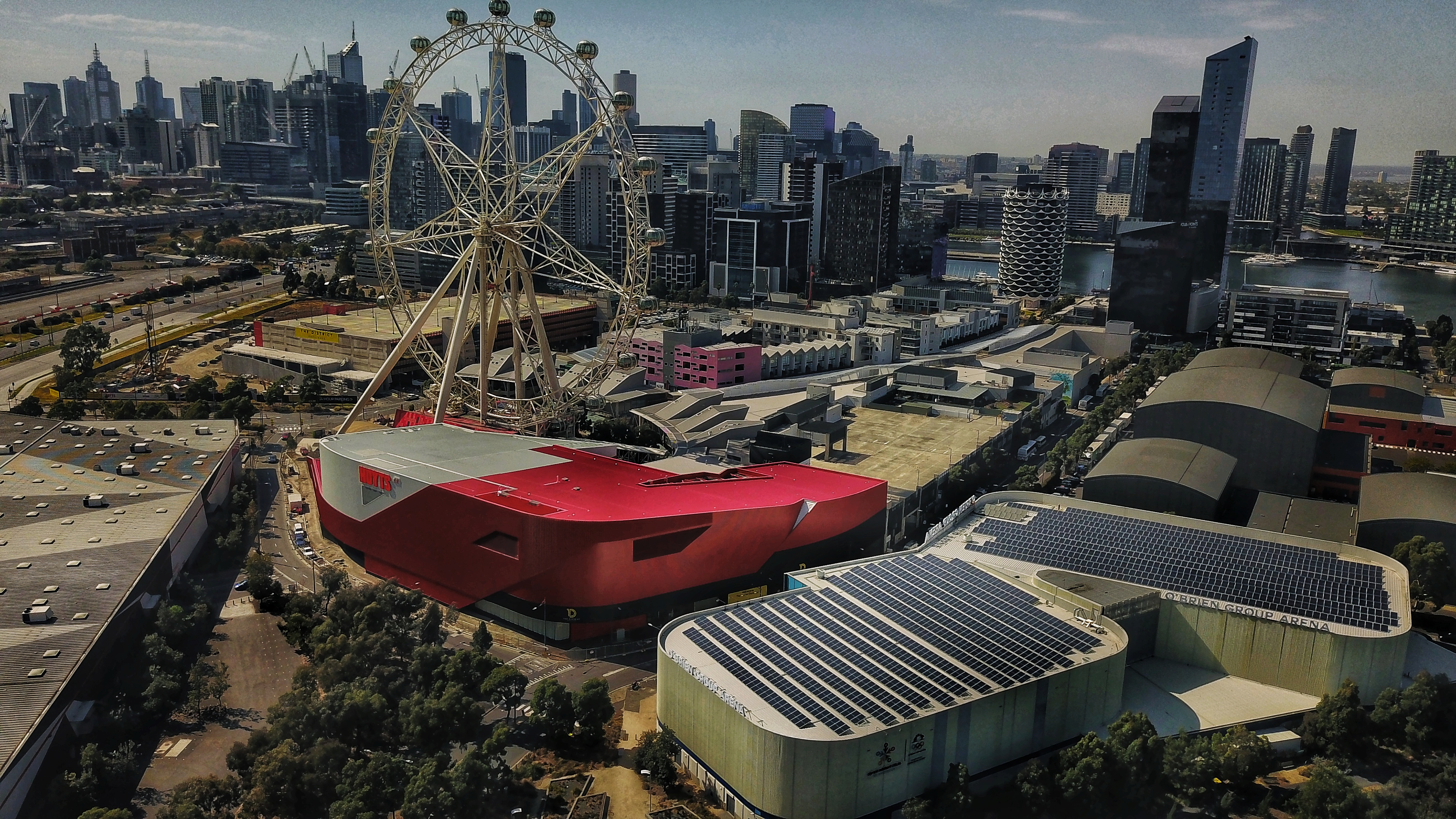
Docklands
2 skyscrapers completed (Note: Victoria Police Centre Tower 2 (180 m) · Melbourne Quarter Tower (155.2 m))

== Tallest under construction or approved ==
This is a list of currently topped-out, under-construction or approved skyscrapers set for Melbourne.

Key:
Topped out	Under construction	On hold	Approved

Name	Height		Floors	Purpose	Precinct of Melbourne	Estimated completion	Status
Name	m	ft	Floors	Purpose	Precinct of Melbourne	Estimated completion	Status
25–35 Power Street	280.3	920	71	Mixed use	Southbank	TBA	Approved
Queens Place South Tower	251	823	79	Residential	CBD	TBA	Approved
400 Queen Street	250	820	67	Residential	CBD	TBA	Approved
BLVD	244	801	74	Residential	Southbank	2028	Under construction
Atlas	242	794	72	Residential	CBD	2030	Under construction
The One	240	790	71	Mixed use	Southbank	TBA	Approved
640 Bourke Street	234.6	770	68	Mixed use	CBD	TBA	Approved
Shangri-La by the Gardens	231.7	760	59	Hotel	CBD	TBA	Topped out and on hold
295 City Road	228	748	70	Residential	Southbank	TBA	Approved
Aura	222	728	67	Residential	Southbank	2030	Under construction
435 Bourke Street	214.9	705	55	Office	CBD	2026	Topped out
268–274 City Road	187	614	55	Residential	Southbank	TBA	Approved
600 Collins	182	597	47	Office	CBD	2026	On hold
60–82 Johnson Street Tower 1A	181	594	53	Residential	South Melbourne	TBA	Approved
60–82 Johnson Street Tower 2B	181	594	53	Residential	South Melbourne	TBA	Approved
Melbourne Square Tower 5	180	590	54	Hotel	Southbank	TBA	Approved
Moray House	180	590	56	Mixed use	Southbank	2027	Under construction
Melbourne Square Tower 3	175	574	56	Residential	Southbank	TBA	Approved
Melbourne Square Tower 4	175	574	56	Residential	Southbank	TBA	Approved
52–60 Collins Street	163.1	535	40	Office	CBD	TBA	Approved
56–62 Clarendon Street	159.7	524	49	Residential	Southbank	TBA	Approved
32 Flinders Street	158.5	520	41	Office	CBD	2026	Under construction

== Major cancelled, revised or vision projects ==
This is a list of cancelled, revised or vision skyscraper proposals that were previously set for Melbourne.

Key:
Revised	Cancelled	Vision

Name	Height		Floors	Purpose	Precinct of Melbourne	Proposed	Status
Name	m	ft	Floors	Purpose	Precinct of Melbourne	Proposed	Status
Grollo Tower	680	2,230	137	Mixed use	Docklands	1997	Cancelled
South Pacific Centre	610	2,000	150	Mixed use	Docklands	—	Vision
Grollo Tower	560	1,840	113	Mixed use	Docklands	2001	Cancelled
555 Collins Street	404	1,325	82	Office	CBD	2013	Revised
Australia 108	388	1,273	108	Mixed use	Southbank	2012	Revised
Victoria Central Tower	380	1,250	80	Mixed use	CBD	—	Cancelled
Urban Tree	360	1,180	TBA	Mixed use	Southbank	2018	Vision
The Lanescraper	359.6	1,180	TBA	Mixed use	Southbank	2018	Vision
Stack	359	1,178	TBA	Mixed use	Southbank	2018	Vision
STH BNK by Beulah Tower 1	356.2	1,169	102	Residential	Southbank	2018	Cancelled
The Base	345	1,132	TBA	Mixed use	Southbank	2018	Vision
Melbourne Plaza	338	1,109	53	Office	CBD	—	Cancelled
The Beulah Propeller City	335	1,099	TBA	Mixed use	Southbank	2018	Vision
Magic	330	1,080	60	Residential	Carlton	2018	Vision
One Queensbridge	323.6	1,062	90	Mixed use	Southbank	2015	Cancelled
Queensbridge Tower	308	1,010	84	Mixed use	Southbank	2011	Revised
555 Collins Street	302	991	82	Mixed use	CBD	2014	Revised
433–455 Collins Street	300	980	–	Mixed use	CBD	2014	Cancelled
Premier Tower	294	965	90	Mixed use	CBD	2014	Revised
STH BNK by Beulah Tower 2	252.2	827	72	Mixed use	Southbank	2018	Cancelled
280 Queen Street	251.8	826	80	Residential	CBD	2014	Vision
Elysium	243.8	800	75	Residential	Southbank	2011	Vision
383 La Trobe Street	242	794	70	Mixed use	CBD	2016	Vision
Tower Melbourne	226	741	71	Residential	CBD	2012	Cancelled
582–606 Collins Street	185.5	609	54	Mixed use	CBD	2015	Vision
32 Flinders Street	174	571	54	Residential	CBD	TBA	Vision
447 Collins Street Twin Towers 1	165	541	47	Office	CBD	2015	Revised
447 Collins Street Twin Towers 2	165	541	47	Office	CBD	2015	Revised

== Timeline of tallest buildings ==
This lists buildings that were once the tallest in Melbourne.

Name	Image	Years as tallest	Height	Floors	Notes
Kew Asylum		1871–1876	30 m (98 ft)	3	
Yorkshire Brewery Tower		1876–1888	34 m (112 ft)	8	
Fink's Building		1888	43 m (141 ft)	10	Partially demolished in 1897 due to fire
Federal Coffee Palace		1888–1889	50 m (160 ft)	9	Height to roof (7 storeys) 47.5 m (156 ft) (to tower additional 2 storeys) 50 m (160 ft). Demolished in 1972.
Australian Building		1890–1929	53 m (174 ft)	12	Tallest building in Australia (1890–1912). Demolished in 1980.
APA Tower (also known as the APA Building)		1929–1958	76 m (249 ft)	14	Demolished in 1969
Orica House		1958–1962	81 m (266 ft)	20	Tallest building in Australia (1958–1961)
CRA Building		1962–1969	96 m (315 ft)	26	Demolished in 1988
AMP Square		1969–1971	113.4 m (372 ft)	28	
Marland House		1971–1972	121 m (397 ft)	32	
140 William Street		1972–1975	152.5 m (500 ft)	41	
Optus Centre		1975–1977	153 m (502 ft)	34	
Nauru House		1977–1978	182 m (597 ft)	52	
ANZ Tower at Collins Place		1978–1986	188 m (617 ft)	56	Equal-tallest building in Melbourne with Wentworth Hotel at Collins Place from 1980 to 1986
Wentworth Hotel at Collins Place		1980–1986	188 m (617 ft)	50	Equal-tallest building in Melbourne with ANZ Tower at Collins Place
Rialto Towers		1986–1991	251.1 m (824 ft)	63	Tallest building in Australia (1986–1991), tallest building in Australia to roof (1986–2006)
101 Collins Street		1991	260 m (850 ft)	50	Tallest building in Australia (1991)
120 Collins Street		1991–2006	266.6 m (875 ft)	52	Tallest building in Australia (1991–2005)
Eureka Tower		2006–2020	297.3 m (975 ft)	91	Tallest building in Australia to roof (2006–2020)
Australia 108		2020–present	316.7 m (1,039 ft)	100	Tallest building in Australia to roof (2020–present)

== See also ==
- List of tallest structures in Australia
