= Abode318 =

Residential skyscraper in Melbourne Australia

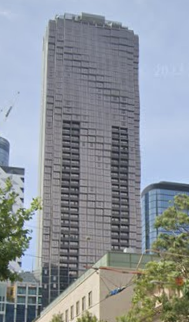

- Location within Melbourne

General information
- Status: Completed
- Type: Residential
- Location: 302–324 Russell Street, Melbourne, Victoria, Australia
- Coordinates: 37.8092°S 144.9645°E
- Construction started: 2011
- Completed: 2015
- Cost: A$136 million

Height
- Tip: 187.3 m (614.5 ft)
- Roof: 187.3 m (614.5 ft)
- Top floor: 172.9 m (567.3 ft)

Technical details
- Floor count: 57 plus 1 underground
- Floor area: 45,000 m^{2} (480,000 sq ft)
- Lifts/elevators: 4

Design and construction
- Architects: Elenberg Fraser; Disegno Australia
- Developer: PDG Corporation; Schiavello Group
- Structural engineer: Meinhardt Group
- Main contractor: ProBuild

Website
- Official website

Abode318 is a residential skyscraper developed by PDG Corporation and Schiavello and designed by Elenberg Fraser and Disegno Australia in Melbourne, Victoria, Australia. As of November 2026, the skyscraper is the 40th-tallest building in Melbourne.

Initially proposed in 2007, and named the Barton Tower, the skyscraper anticipated the current trend of "skinny skyscrapers" proposed in Melbourne. The building features a "curving exterior" which is illuminated by 10 millimetres of rose coloured glass, incorporating thermal properties that insulate the skyscraper. Abode318 comprises 450 apartments across 57 levels, and reaches a height of 187.3 metres (615 ft). The project received approval by then-Planning Minister Matthew Guy in 2011, with construction commencing later that year. At a cost of A$136 million, the building topped-out in late 2014, and was completed by early 2015. At the time of its completion, Abode318 was the 10th-tallest building in Melbourne; additionally, it became the first building since the 2006 completion of the Eureka Tower to be listed in the "10-tallest buildings of Melbourne".

== See also ==
- List of tallest buildings in Australia
