= 568 Collins Street =

Mixed–use skyscraper in Melbourne, Victoria, Australia

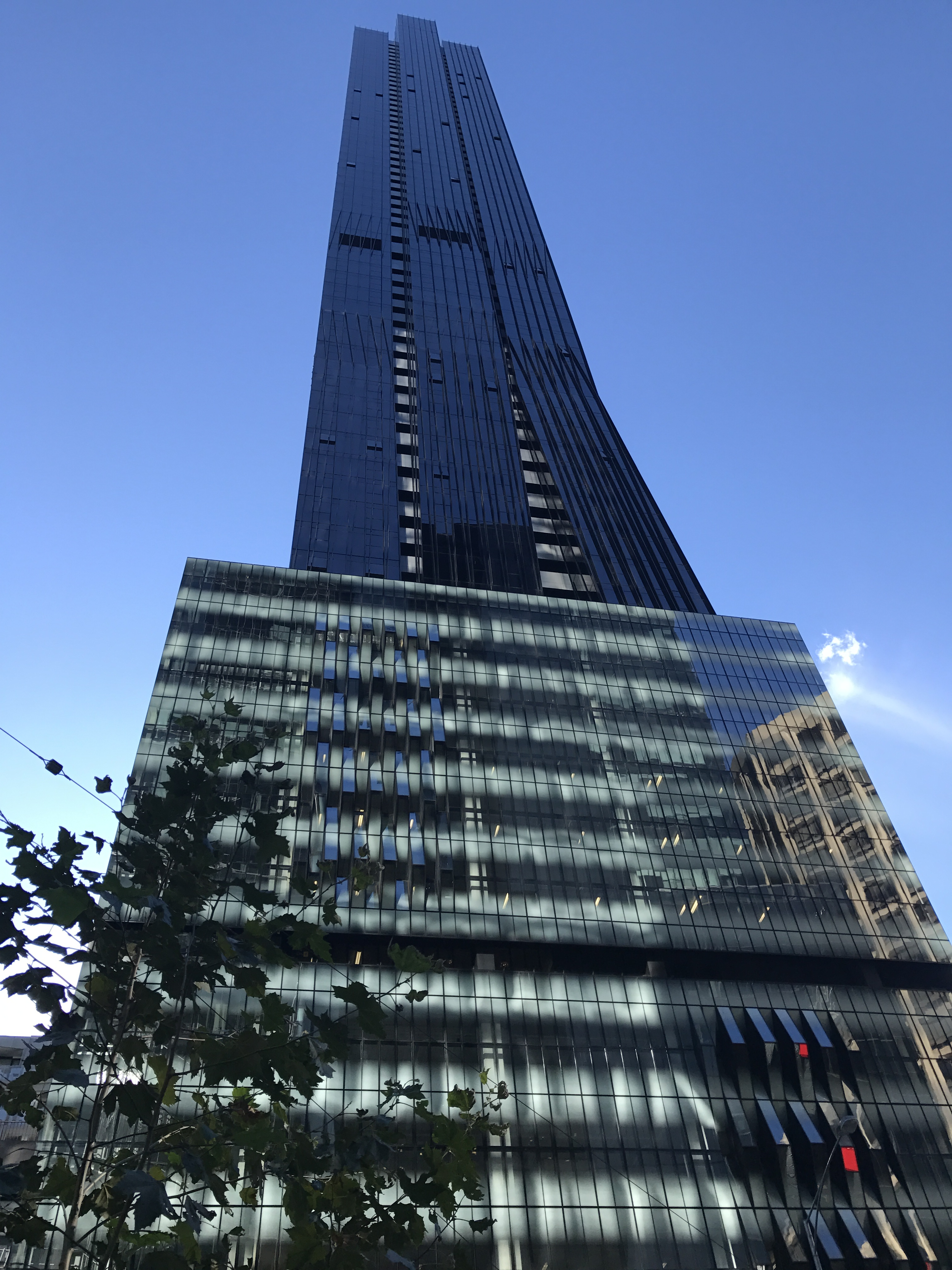
- 568 Collins Street in May 2017

General information
- Status: Completed
- Location: 568 Collins Street, Melbourne, Victoria (Australia)
- Coordinates: 37.81836°S 144.95542°E
- Construction started: 2012
- Completed: 2015
- Cost: AUD$161 million

Height
- Roof: 224 m (735 ft)

Technical details
- Floor count: 69

Design and construction
- Architect: Bruce Henderson Architects
- Developer: Stamoulis Property Group
- Main contractor: Hickory Group

568 Collins Street is a mixed–use skyscraper in Melbourne, Victoria, Australia.

The building was first proposed in 2011 and later approved by then-Planning Minister Matthew Guy in early 2012. The skyscraper reaches 224 metres in height– making it one of the tallest buildings in Melbourne. The tower includes 588 residential apartments spanning across 69 levels, as well as offices.

Construction on the $161 million project commenced in mid-2012 and was completed in September 2015. At the time of its completion, 568 Collins Street became the equal 11th–tallest building in Melbourne to roof and equal 25th–tallest overall. Apartments span from floors 34 to 69 with the 33rd floor being the gym, pool, spa and sauna. Below, the Aussie Escape Apartments and offices fill up the rest of the building. On street level, an EzyMart is found.

== See also ==
- List of tallest buildings in Melbourne
- Architecture of Melbourne

== Gallery ==
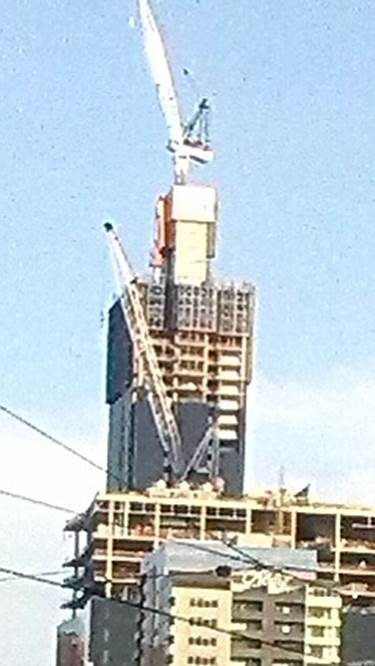
568 Collins Street under construction in December 2014

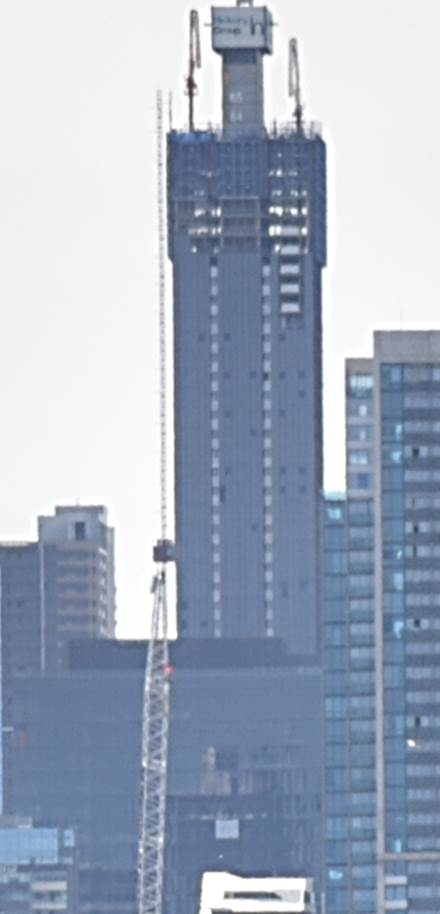
568 Collins Street under construction in March 2015

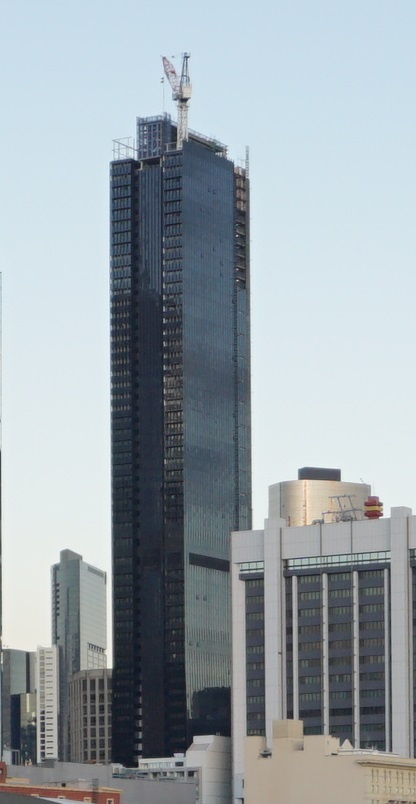
568 Collins Street under construction in June 2015

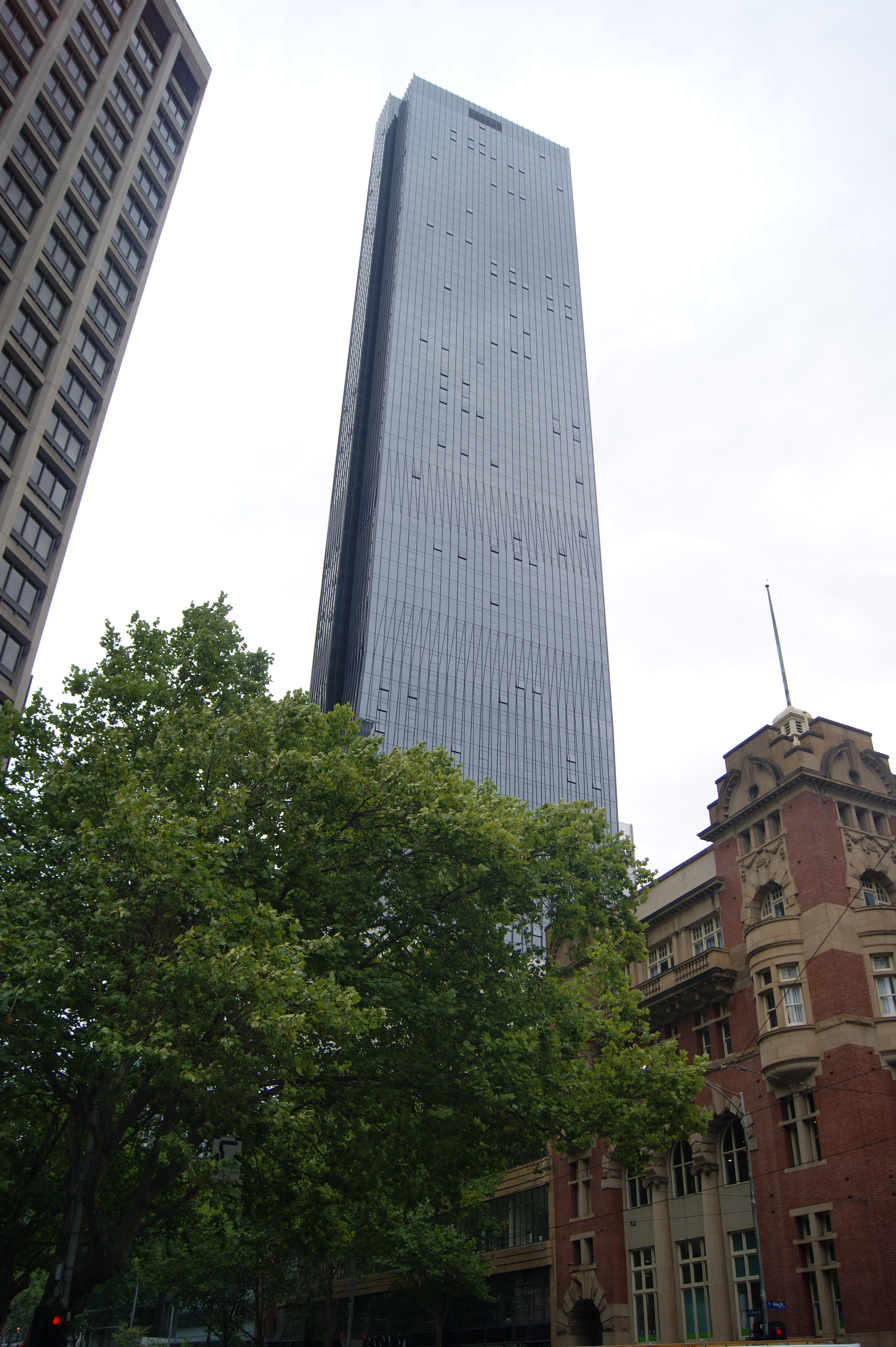
568 Collins Street from King Street
