= 25–35 Power Street =

General information
- Status: Never built
- Location: Southbank, Victoria (Australia)
- Coordinates: 37°49′23.8″S 144°57′43.2″E
- Cost: AUD$400 million

Height
- Roof: 280.3 m (920 ft)
- Top floor: 273 m (896 ft)

Technical details
- Floor count: 71 plus 1 underground
- Floor area: 109,908 m^{2} (1,183,040 sq ft)

Design and construction
- Architect: Metier 3
- Developer: M&L Hospitality

25–35 Power Street (also referred to as 38 Freshwater Place) is an approved mixed-use skyscraper in the Southbank precinct of Melbourne, Victoria, Australia.

Designed by Docklands-based Metier 3 and developed by M&L Hospitality, the project was proposed in 2014, for a 280.3-metre-tall (920 ft), 71-storey residential and hotel skyscraper. The residential component of the building would comprise 496 apartment dwellings, whilst the hotel section would include 390 hotel suites. The overall exterior design of the building was inspired by a Ball gown "with flowering curves".

The development received approval in April 2015, by Planning Minister Richard Wynne. If constructed, the A$400 million skyscraper would become the third-tallest building in Melbourne, behind the nearby Eureka Tower and recently completed Australia 108.

== See also ==
- List of tallest buildings in Melbourne
