= Melbourne Square (complex) =

Skyscraper complex in Melbourne, Australia

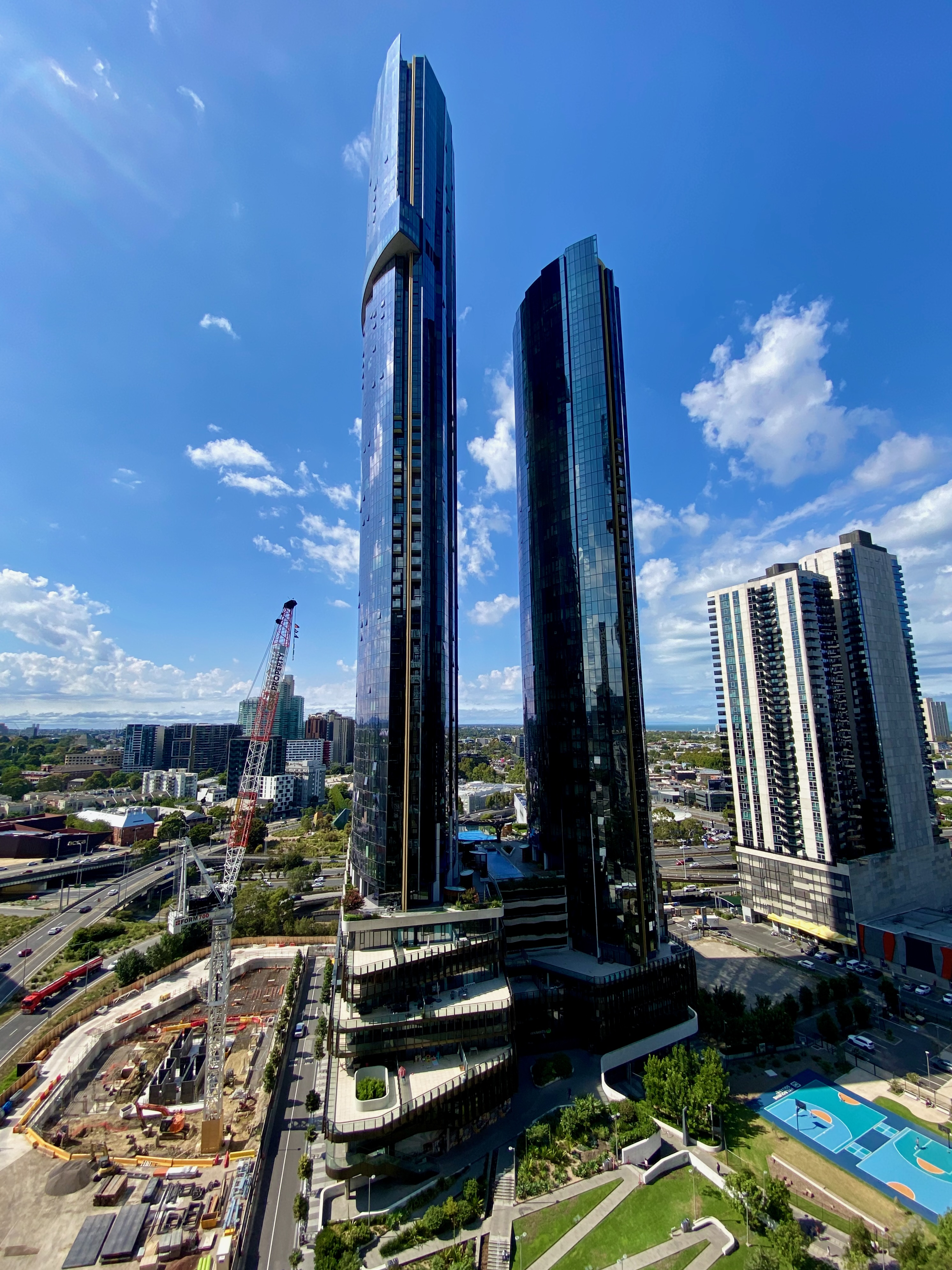
- Towers 1 and 2 in early 2025, tower 5 is under construction at left

General information
- Status: Complete (Tower 1,2); Approved (Tower 3,4,5,6)
- Location: 93–119 Kavanagh Street, Southbank, Victoria, Australia
- Coordinates: 37.8256°S 144.9629°E
- Groundbreaking: November 2017
- Completed: 2021 (Tower 1, 2); Estimated 2027 (Tower 3-6)
- Cost: A$2.8 bn

Height
- Roof: T1: 231 m (758 ft); T2: 179 m (587 ft); T3: 175 m (574 ft); T4: 175 m (574 ft); T5: 180 m (590 ft); T6: 145 m (476 ft)

Technical details
- Floor count: T1: 70; T2: 59; T3: 56; T4: 56; T5: 54; T6: 37
- Floor area: 364,140 m^{2} (3,919,600 sq ft) (in 6 towers)

Design and construction
- Architect: Cox Architecture
- Developer: OSK Property

Melbourne Square is a A$2.8 billion building complex of residential mixed-use towers in the Southbank precinct of Melbourne, Victoria, Australia. The complex will be constructed in five stages, with a permit requiring completion by 2031. Stage one of the development commenced construction in November 2017, and was completed in May 2021.

== History ==
The master planned precinct envisions six towers across a 20,260-square-metre (218,100 sq ft) site – two residential buildings now completed (Towers 2 and 3), another residential tower planned to start construction in 2024 (Tower 1), a build-to-rent tower planned to start construction in 2025 (Tower 4), and two remaining towers yet to be determined. The complex will be built in five stages, with a permit requiring completion by 2031.

Proposed in June 2015 by the Malaysian property developer OSK Property, designed by Cox Architecture, with interiors by Carr Design Group, Melbourne Square received planning approval by Planning Minister Richard Wynne on 24 December 2015.

The $2.8 bn complex is expected to become one of the largest development proposals in Victoria's history, encompassing a total 364,140 square metres (3,919,600 square feet) of floor space. In October 2017, Multiplex had been appointed to construct the first stage of the development, which will include the park, two residential towers and the new retail precinct; construction commenced in November that year, completing it in May 2021.

As of 2026, Tower 1 is the 15th-tallest building in Melbourne and 32nd-tallest building in Australia at a height of 231 metres (758 ft), and Tower 2 is the 42nd-tallest building in Melbourne and 87th-tallest building in Australia at a height of 179 metres (587 ft).
