= National Bank House =

Commercial skyscraper located in Melbourne, Victoria, Australia

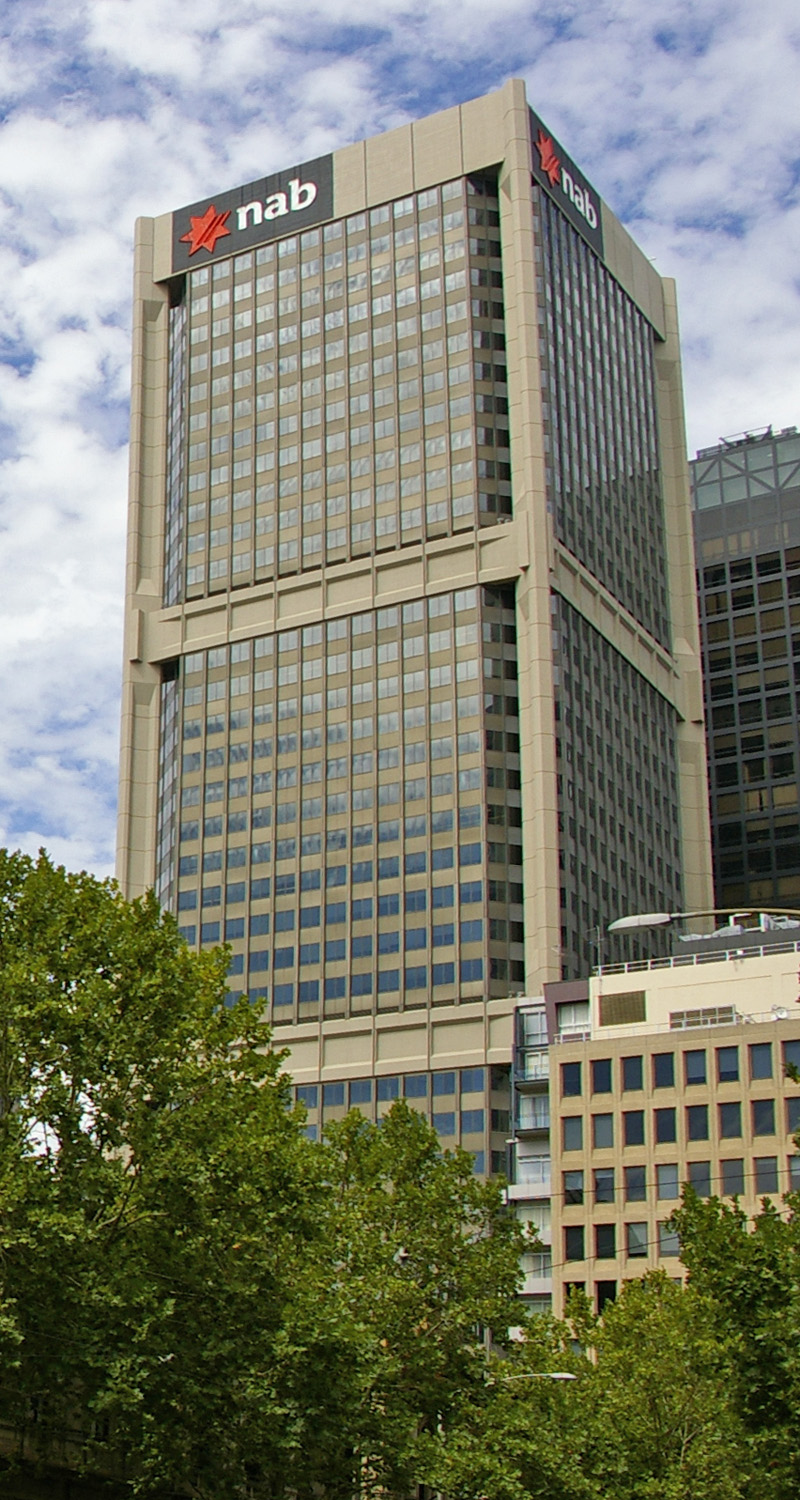

General information
- Status: Completed
- Type: Office
- Location: 500 Bourke Street, Melbourne, Australia
- Coordinates: 37.8151284°S 144.9588138°E
- Completed: 1978
- Owner: IFM Investors

Height
- Tip: 161 m (528.2 ft)
- Roof: 161 m (528.2 ft)

Technical details
- Floor count: 40
- Floor area: 48,248 m^{2} (519,340 sq ft)

Design and construction
- Architect: John Wardle Architects

National Bank House is a commercial skyscraper located in Melbourne, Victoria, Australia, completed in 1978, designed by architects Godfrey and Spowers. The National Bank of Australia, later the National Australia Bank, made it their headquarters on completion.

Located near the crest of the western hill of Bourke Street, the skyscraper was built in the mid-1970s as a speculative office tower, which was fully occupied by the National Bank of Australia as their headquarters. In 1982 they merged with Commercial Banking Company of Sydney to form the National Australia Bank, known as the NAB. In 2004, the NAB moved their global head offices to 700 - 800 Bourke Street, "National @ Docklands", both located in the Docklands precinct of Melbourne, but the bank still remains a full tenant of National Bank House. In 2009, the building was fully refurbished by then owner ISPT in order to increase energy efficiency to 5 stars, and the ground level was rebuilt with a new lobby, refurbished rear plaza cafes and street canopy designed by John Wardle architects.

National Bank House reaches 161 metres in height, and comprises 40 storeys of offices. At the time of its completion in 1978, it was the third-tallest building in Melbourne; the commercial building is, as of 2026, tied as the 65th-tallest in the city.

== See also ==
- List of tallest buildings in Australia
