= Queens Place (complex) =

- Approved design of Queens Place

General information
- Status: South Tower: Approved; North Tower: Complete
- Location: 350 Queen Street, Melbourne, Victoria, Australia
- Estimated completion: South Tower: TBA; North Tower: 2021
- Cost: ~A$1 billion

Height
- Roof: South Tower: 251 m (823 ft); North Tower: 252.8 m (829 ft)

Technical details
- Floor count: South Tower: 79; North Tower: 79

Design and construction
- Architects: Fender Katsalidis Architects; Cox Architecture
- Developer: 3L Alliance

Queens Place is an approved residential complex of twin skyscrapers, to be built on 350 Queen Street in Melbourne, Victoria. Upon completion, they will be amongst the tallest buildings in Melbourne, and the tallest twin skyscrapers in Australia.

The 350 Queen Street site, which hosts KTS House –a 21-story office building– was purchased by Chinese developers 3L Alliance in October 2014, for $135 million. In 2015, 3L Alliance submitted plans through Fender Katsalidis Architects and Cox Architecture for two residential skyscrapers reaching heights of 249 metres (817 feet) and 251 metres (823 feet), respectively, and to comprise 1,700 apartments across 79 levels. These plans would retain the KTS House commercial skyscraper, which would sit in between the twin skyscrapers.

In October 2015, the project received planning approval by the City of Melbourne, before being approved by the Minister for Planning Richard Wynne in March 2016. Construction on the North Tower commenced in January 2018 and was completed in 2021.

== See also ==
- List of tallest buildings in Melbourne
