= List of tallest buildings in Oceania =

This is a list of the tallest buildings in Oceania which measures all buildings to the highest architectural detail. This list does not include the Sky Tower in Auckland, which is taller than the buildings listed but is considered a freestanding structure instead.

The tallest building is the Q1 Tower on the Gold Coast, Queensland, with a height of 322.5 metres including its spire.

== Tallest buildings ==
This list ranks buildings in Oceania that stand at least 150 m (492 ft) tall, based on CTBUH height measurement standards. This includes spires and architectural details but does not include antenna masts. An equal sign (=) following a rank indicates the same height between two or more buildings.

Was the tallest building in Oceania upon completion
Indicates was the tallest buildings in Oceania that have been architecturally topped out but completed

Rank	Name	Image	City	Country or Territory	Height m (ft)	Floors	Year	Notes	Ref
1	Q1		Gold Coast	Australia	322.5 m (1058 ft)	78	2005	Tallest building in Australia.	
2	Australia 108		Melbourne	Australia	316.7 m (1039 ft)	100	2020	Tallest building in Oceania by roof height. Topped-out in November 2019.	
3	Eureka Tower		Melbourne	Australia	297 m (974.4 ft)	91	2006		
4	Crown Sydney		Sydney	Australia	275 m (902 ft)	75	2020	Completed in December 2020. Tallest building in Sydney	
5	Brisbane Skytower		Brisbane	Australia	274.3 m(900 ft)	90	2019	Tallest building in Brisbane since 2019. Largest residential building in the Southern Hemisphere since 2019 with a gross floor area of 147,000sqm. First skyscraper in Australia to be built on an equilateral triangle footprint. First building in the world to be built with a height adjustable tower crane. Tallest building completed in the 2010s.	
6	The One		Brisbane	Australia	274 m(899 ft)	82	2020		
7	Aurora Melbourne Central		Melbourne	Australia	270.5 m (887 ft)	92	2019		
8	West Side Place Tower A		Melbourne	Australia	268.7 m (876 ft)	81	2019		Construction started in 2017.
9	1 William Street		Brisbane	Australia	267 m(876 ft)	46	2016	Tallest office building in Brisbane. Nicknamed 'The Tower of Power'.	
10	120 Collins Street		Melbourne	Australia	265 m (869.4 ft)	52	1991	Tallest office building in Oceania.	
11	Salesforce Tower		Sydney	Australia	263 m (863 ft)	53	2022		
12	Infinity Tower		Brisbane	Australia	262 m(860 ft)	81	2013		
13	Central Park		Perth	Australia	261.7 m (859 ft)	51	1992	Tallest building in Western Australia.	
14	101 Collins Street		Melbourne	Australia	260 m (853 ft)	50	1991		
15	Prima Pearl		Melbourne	Australia	254 m (833.3 ft)	72	2014		
16	Ocean Tower GC		Gold Coast	Australia	252.3 m (828 ft)	75	2022	Second tallest building on the Gold Coast.	
17	Rialto Towers		Melbourne	Australia	251 m (823.4 ft)	63	1986		
18	Queens Place Tower 1		Melbourne	Australia	249.9 m (820 ft)	79	2021		
19	One Sydney Harbour Tower 1		Sydney	Australia	247 m (810 ft)	72	2023		
20	Premier Tower		Melbourne	Australia	246 m (809 ft)	78	2021		
21=	Chifley Tower		Sydney	Australia	244 m (800.5 ft)	53	1992		
21=	City Square		Perth	Australia	244 m (800.5 ft)	46	2011	Also known as BHP City Square	
21=	Soul		Gold Coast	Australia	243 m (797.2 ft)	77	2012		
21=	Soleil		Brisbane	Australia	243 m (797.2 ft)	74	2011		
21=	Citigroup Centre		Sydney	Australia	243 m (797.2 ft)	50	2000		
22	Victoria One		Melbourne	Australia	241 m (790.6 ft)	75	2018		
23=	Deutsche Bank Place		Sydney	Australia	239 m (784.1 ft)	39	2005	160 m to roof	
23=	West Side Place Tower D		Melbourne	Australia	239 m (784 ft)	72	2023		
24	Greenland Centre		Sydney	Australia	237 m (778 ft)	67	2020		
25	Swanston Central		Melbourne	Australia	236.7 m (776.6 ft)	71	2019		
26	Shangri-La by the Gardens		Melbourne	Australia	231.7 m (760 ft)	59	2023		
27	Melbourne Square Tower 1		Melbourne	Australia	231 m (758 ft)	70	2021		
28=	World Tower		Sydney	Australia	230 m (754.5 ft)	73	2004		
28=	West Side Place Tower C		Melbourne	Australia	230 m (754 ft)	70	2023		
28=	One Sydney Harbour Tower 2		Sydney	Australia	230 m (754 ft)	68	2023		
29	Vision Apartments		Melbourne	Australia	229 m (751.2 ft)	70	2016		
30	25 Martin Place		Sydney	Australia	228 m (748 ft)	60	1977		
31	Governor Phillip Tower		Sydney	Australia	227 m (744.7 ft)	54	1993		
32	6 & 8 Parramatta Square		Parramatta	Australia	225 m (738 ft)	55	2022		
33	Bourke Place		Melbourne	Australia	224 m (734.9 ft)	49	1991		
34	Ernst & Young Tower at Latitude		Sydney	Australia	222 m (728.3 ft)	45	2004		
35	Circle on Cavill - North Tower		Gold Coast	Australia	220 m (721.7 ft)	70	2007		
36	Aurora Place		Sydney	Australia	219 m (718.5 ft)	41	2001		
37=	Light House Melbourne		Melbourne	Australia	218 m (715 ft)	69	2018		
37=	Telstra Corporate Centre		Melbourne	Australia	218 m (715.2 ft)	47	1992		
38	International Tower 1		Sydney	Australia	217 m (711.9 ft)	49	2016	Also known as International Tower C3	
39	380 Melbourne		Melbourne	Australia	217 m (714 ft)	67	2021		
40	Quay Quarter Tower		Sydney	Australia	216 m (709 ft)	54	1976/2022	Original built as the AMP Centre in 1976 at 188 m (617 ft) and 45 floors.	
41	108 St Georges Terrace		Perth	Australia	214 m (702.1 ft)	50	1988		
42	180 George Street North Tower		Parramatta	Australia	213 m (699 ft)	67	2023		
43=	The Tower at Melbourne Central		Melbourne	Australia	211 m (692.2 ft)	54	1991		
43=	West Side Place Tower B		Melbourne	Australia	211 m (692.1 ft)	65	2021		Construction started in 2017.
44	Aspire Melbourne		Melbourne	Australia	210.6 m (619 ft)	66	2023		
45	Aurora Tower		Brisbane	Australia	207 m (679.1 ft)	69	2006		
46	Freshwater Place		Melbourne	Australia	205 m (672.5 ft)	63	2005		
47	Eq. Tower		Melbourne	Australia	202.7 m (665 ft)	65	2017		
48	Riparian Plaza		Brisbane	Australia	200 m (656.1 ft)	53	2005		
49=	Home Southbank		Melbourne	Australia	198 m (650 ft)	60	2022		
49=	Melbourne Grand		Melbourne	Australia	198 m (650 ft)	57	2020		
50=	One One One Eagle Street		Brisbane	Australia	195 m (639.7 ft)	50	2011		
50=	ANZ Bank Centre		Sydney	Australia	195 m (639.7 ft)	46	2013		
51	Hilton Surfers Hotel		Gold Coast	Australia	194 m (636.4 ft)	57	2011		
52	Collins House		Melbourne	Australia	190 m (623 ft)	59	2019		
53	180 George Street South Tower		Parramatta	Australia	189 m (620 ft)	59	2023		
54	Abode318		Melbourne	Australia	188 m (616.7 ft)	57	2014		
55	Seascape		Auckland	New Zealand	187 m (614 ft)	56	2025	Tallest Building in New Zealand	
56	Suncorp Place		Sydney	Australia	186 m (610.2 ft)	48	1982		
57	Sofitel Hotel - Collins Place		Melbourne	Australia	185 m (606.9 ft)	50	1981		
58	PWC Tower at Commercial Bay (skyscraper)		Auckland	New Zealand	180.1 m (591 ft)	41	2020	Tallest Office building in New Zealand and tallest in the country from 2020-2023	
59	Victoria Police Centre Tower 2		Melbourne	Australia	180 m (591 ft)	40	2020		
60	Melbourne Square Tower 2		Melbourne	Australia	179 m (587 ft)	59	2021		
61=	The Pacifica		Auckland	New Zealand	178 m (584 ft)	57	2020	2nd Tallest Residential building in New Zealand. Tallest building by Highest occupiable floor and floor count in New Zealand	
61=	Chapel Tower		Melbourne	Australia	178 m (584 ft)	50	2019		
62	Vero Centre		Auckland	New Zealand	170 m (558 ft)	38	2000	Tallest building in New Zealand from 2000 to 2020.	
63	QV1		Perth	Australia	162.6 m (533 ft)	38	1991		
64	The Ascott Metropolis		Auckland	New Zealand	155 m (509 ft)	40	1999	Tallest building in New Zealand from 1999 to 2000	
65	ANZ Centre		Auckland	New Zealand	153 m (502 ft)	35	1991	Tallest building in New Zealand from 1991 to 1999	
66	Sentinel (building)		Auckland	New Zealand	150 m (492 ft)	30	2007		

== Tallest buildings approved or under construction ==
This list includes buildings that are under construction in Oceania that are planned to rise at least 150m.

Name	City	Country or Territory	Height ft (m)	Floors	Year	Notes	Ref
One Park Lane	Gold Coast	Australia	393 m (1,289 ft)	101	2030	Would be the tallest building in the southern hemisphere	
The Majesty Imperial Tower	Gold Coast	Australia	358 m (1,175 ft)	108	2028	Approved	
Cypress Palms Tower 1	Gold Coast	Australia	305.2 m (1,001 ft)	90	2027	Construction started in 2024	
30 Albert Street	Brisbane	Australia	270.4 m (887 ft)	91	-	Approved	
No. 1 Brisbane	Brisbane	Australia	262 m (860. ft)	82	-	Approved	
STH BNK by Beulah Tower 2	Melbourne	Australia	252.2 m (827 ft)	72	2028	Approved	
Te Pumanawa Downtown West Tower A	Auckland	New Zealand	227 m (744 ft)	55	2032	Approved/pre-construction	
NDG Auckland Centre	Auckland	New Zealand	209 m (686 ft)	52	2023-2024	Approved. As of October 2019, construction has not yet started. When built, it would be the tallest skyscraper in New Zealand.	
65 Federal Street	Auckland	New Zealand	180 m (591 ft)	46	2022-2024	Approved and should be completed by 2024	
Te Pumanawa Downtown West Tower B	Auckland	New Zealand	164 m (538 ft)	45	2032	Approved, but according to recent information It has been delayed	
51 Albert Street	Auckland	New Zealand	160 m (525 ft)	41	2022	Currently under Construction and is set to be completed in 2022	
Burj Takapuna	Auckland	New Zealand	152.6 m (501 ft)	38	N/A	Approved	

== See also ==
- List of tallest buildings in Australia
- List of tallest structures in New Zealand
- List of tallest buildings in Asia
- List of tallest buildings in Africa
- List of tallest buildings in Europe
- List of tallest buildings in South America
- List of tallest buildings in the world
