= Robert Bird Group =

Australian global consulting engineering firm

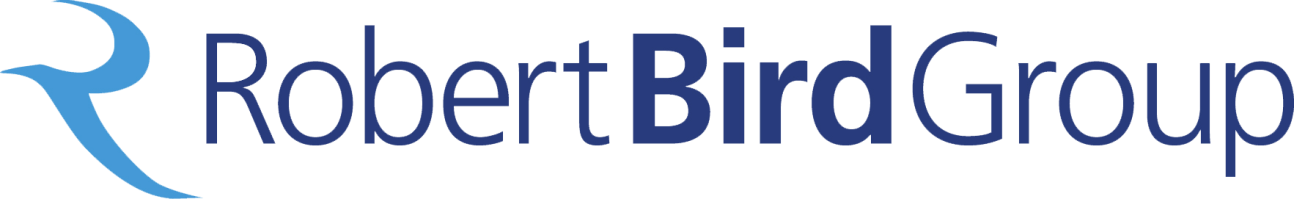
- Company type: Private
- Industry: Engineering Consultant
- Founded: 1982; 44 years ago
- Founder: Robert Bird
- Headquarters: Brisbane, Australia
- Number of locations: 11 offices
- Key people: Jason Beutel (CEO)
- Website: Official website

Robert Bird Group (RBG), established in 1982, is an Australian global consulting engineering firm. RBG became a member of the Surbana Jurong Group in late 2017.

== Services ==
Robert Bird Group provides structural engineering, civil engineering, construction engineering (temporary works), geotechnical engineering (UK & Middle East), and virtual design and construction services.

== Major projects ==
=== Australia ===
- 400 George Street
- AAMI Stadium
- Australia108
- Crown Sydney
- Salesforce Tower
- Victoria One
- Eq. Tower
- Riparian Plaza
- 600 Collins Street
- The Tower, One St George Wharf
- Chapel Tower
- The Oracle Beach Tower
- One Central Park
- 35 Spring Street

=== United Kingdom ===
- 100 Bishopsgate
- Spire London
- The Tower, One St George Wharf
- 70 Gracechurch Street
- Elizabeth House
- One The Elephant
- Trafalgar Place
- Phoenix

=== Middle East & Northern Africa ===
- ICD Brookfield Place

=== South-East Asia ===
- Merdeka PNB118
