= Melbourne Central =

Melbourne Central may refer to:

- Aurora Melbourne Central, a skyscraper in Melbourne, Australia
- Melbourne Central Shopping Centre, a shopping centre in Melbourne, Australia
- Melbourne Central railway station, a railway station in Melbourne, Australia
