= Batman's Hill =

Hill in Melbourne, Australia

Coordinates: 37°49′12″S 144°57′11″E

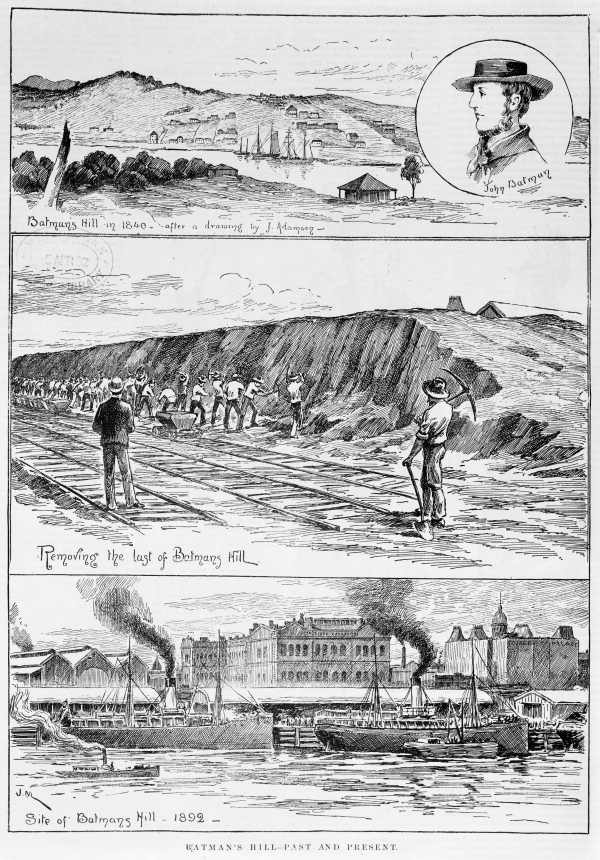
Illustration depicting the changes to Batman's Hill between 1840 and 1892

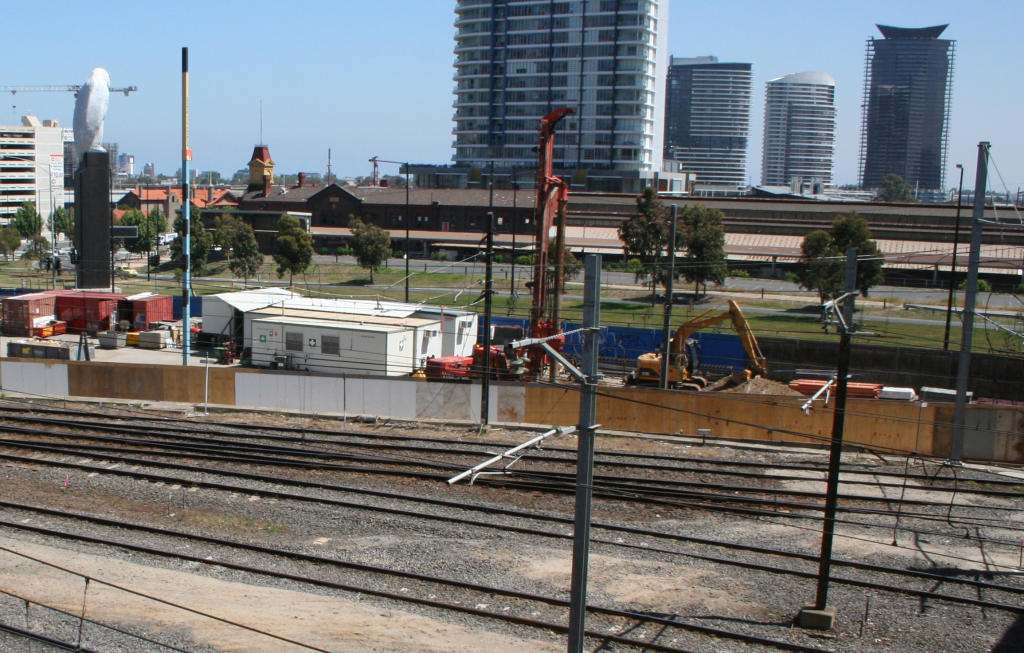
Looking south-west from the Collins Street Bridge towards the site of Batman's Hill in 2007. The blue post marking the hill can be seen to the left

Batman's Hill in Melbourne, Australia, was named for the Vandemonian adventurer and grazier John Batman. Now removed, the 18-metre-high (59 ft) hill was located to the south of today's Collins Street and Southern Cross railway station, and is the site of a steel marker the same height as the original hill.

The hill, on the traditional country of the Wurundjeri, was first claimed for John Fawkner by his representative Captain John Lancey of the Enterprize, who named it 'Pleasant Hill', and wrote to Fawkner in 1835,

Your lordship has been fortunate in the lot I chose for you. A more delightful spot, I think, cannot be. Beautiful grass, a pleasant prospect, a fine fresh-water river, and the vessel alongside the bank discharging at musket-shot distance from a pleasant hill where I intend to put your house. The garden will trend to the south by the east side of the hill ... The west side of the hill is a beautiful prospect. A salt lagoon and piece of marsh will make a beautiful meadow and bounded on the south by the river. The hill is composed of rich, black soil, thinly wooded with honeysuckle and she-oak. Good grass, a quantity of herbage that I cannot name more than three, viz., parsley of good flavour, peppermint, as good as any I ever tasted, and geraniums in abundance.

In April 1836, the hill was settled by Batman and his family, who built a house at the base where Batman lived until his death in 1839. His widow and family then moved from the house and the government requisitioned the house for government offices.

In 1837, the Hoddle Grid, the first town plan was designed with Batman's Hill as its western boundary.

The hill had many other uses. In February 1839, it acted as a grandstand for Melbourne's first horse race, with the site later the site of navigation beacons, and a hospital. At around the same time, Batman's Hill was also the site of the first cricket match played in Victoria by the founders of the Melbourne Cricket Club. The western slope of Batman's Hill was sold to the government in 1847 and a powder magazine was built. At the foot of the slopes were tanning pits and melting works.

In 1853, the Victorian Government offered a concession to the Melbourne, Mount Alexander & Murray River Railway Company to build a railway from Melbourne to Echuca, including land to the east of Batman's Hill for the terminus. In 1856 the company failed, and was taken over by the government who formed the Victorian Railways to complete the works, the railway station being erected at Spencer Street in 1858. Growing traffic led to an expansion of the freight sheds in 1863, with a contract being signed in November that year for the removal of the hill. Demolition was completed by the middle of 1866. Further changes came with the construction of the No 2 Goods Shed, the Railways Headquarters Building in Spencer Street, Flinders Street Viaduct, Flinders Street Extension and the retaining wall just south of the goods yards in the 1880s and 1890s.

The site now forms the eastern border of the Docklands (a precinct of the Docklands development is also named Batman's Hill) and is dominated by Southern Cross station and the Collins Street bridge built in 2002 to replicate the original curve and shape of the hill.

A significant portion of Batman's Hill is now being developed by the Walker Group as a commercial office precinct called Collins Square.

A 1920s hotel, the Batman's Hill Hotel was named after Batman's Hill.

== Survey datum ==
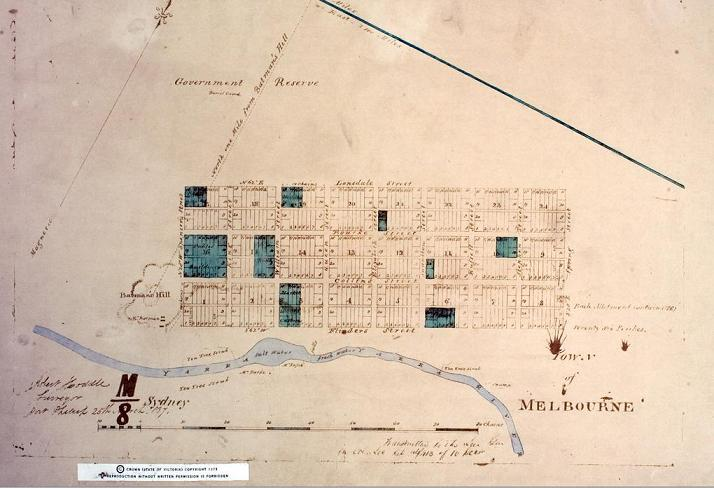
Robert Hoddle's survey of the town of Melbourne in 1837. Batman's Hill–bottom left–is the datum

Robert Hoddle used Batman's Hill as the datum for the cadastral survey of the land around Melbourne from 1837. A grid of orthogonal Section lines at one mile spacing, aligned with magnetic north, divided the land into one square mile (640 acre) sections for subdivision and land sales. The section boundaries were adjusted for watercourses. The linear property boundaries, in the absence of pre-existing tracks, were natural locations for major roads. For example:

- Swan Street, Riversdale Road and Somerville Road are on the east–west section line that passes through the datum.
- Victoria Street and Barkers Road run east–west one mile to the north
- Alexandra Parade and Racecourse Road run east–west two miles to the north
- Royal Parade and Sydney Road run north–south along the section line passing through the datum.
- Hoddle Street runs north–south two miles to the east
- Springvale Road runs north–south twelve miles to the east
