= Treelodge@Punggol =

Coordinates: 1°24′23″N 103°54′21″E

- Alternative names: Treetops@Punggol

General information
- Type: Public Housing
- Location: Punggol Road, Punggol Drive and Punggol Place, Singapore
- Completed: December 2010; 15 years ago
- Owner: HDB
- Operator: HDB

Technical details
- Floor count: 16
- Lifts/elevators: 14

Design and construction
- Architect: Surbana International Consultants
- Developer: HDB
- Main contractor: Kay Lim Construction & Trading

Website
- HDB Webpage

Treelodge@Punggol (Chinese: 绿馨苑) (previously known as Treetops@Punggol) is a HDB estate located in Punggol, Singapore, located at Punggol Road, Punggol Drive and Punggol Place. It is Singapore's first experimental eco-friendly public-housing project and was awarded the Green Mark Platinum Award. The project also won international awards such as the Green Good Design Award in 2010 and the Futurac Green Leadership award in 2011 for its sustainable design.

The sale of the apartments was launched in March 2007 under the Housing & Development Board's Build-To-Order (HDB) Scheme with a 99-year leasehold.

== Building details ==
=== Architecture ===
The estate consists of 712 units of Premium flats housed in seven 16-storey residential blocks. There are 98 units of 3-room flats, 600 units of 4-room flats and 14 units of 5-room loft units. Unique to this Eco-Precinct is the 5-room loft unit which features a double-volume living room and an open terrace that can be converted into a sky garden. Like the other housing projects in the BTO Scheme, Treelodge@Punggol was designed by Surbana International Consultants. Kay Lim Construction & Trading Pte Ltd. won the tender to build the project for $119.70 million on 24 December 2007. The estate was completed in December 2010.

=== FerroLite partition wall system ===
Treelodge@Punggol was one of the piloted HDB projects in Singapore for the FerroLite partition wall system.

Designed to reduce noise transmission between rooms, the flats come fitted with the patented FerroLite partition wall system. The wall is essentially non-load bearing and made of ferrocement. As compared to other cement-based partition walls, the hollow core of the FerroLite wall cuts down on the need for raw materials like cement and sand. In addition, services can be installed and concealed within the wall with minimal wet works and without the need for hacking.
