= Liberty Tower =

Liberty Tower may refer to:

- Liberty Tower (Melbourne), Australia
- Liberty Tower (Manhattan), New York
- Liberty Tower (Dayton), Ohio
- Liberty Tower (South Bend), Indiana
- Liberty Tower (Tulsa), Oklahoma
- Liberty Tower (Warsaw), a proposed skyscraper in Warsaw

== See also ==
- Liberty Memorial, Kansas City, Missouri
- Liberty Towers (Jersey City), New Jersey
- Liberty Towers (Tulsa), Oklahoma
