= Haunted (Beyoncé song) =

2013 song by Beyoncé

Song by Beyoncé

from the album Beyoncé
- Released: December 13, 2013
- Studio: Jungle City; Oven (New York City)
- Genre: Ambient ("Ghost"); hip-hop; R&B; dance-pop
- Length: 6:09
- Label: Parkwood; Columbia
- Songwriters: Beyoncé Knowles; Jordan "Boots" Asher
- Producers: Knowles; Boots

Music videos
- "Ghost" on YouTube; "Haunted" on YouTube

"Haunted" is a song by the American singer Beyoncé from her fifth studio album, Beyoncé (2013). It was written and produced by Beyoncé and Boots. Conceived by the latter following an infuriating meeting with a record label, the song was presented to Beyoncé who decided to record it following similar experiences in the music industry. The song was inspired by the works of English musician Aphex Twin and contains a stream of consciousness rap.

Musically, it consists of two parts titled "Ghost" and "Haunted". It contains a minimalistic sound with keyboards, bass and percussion. Beyoncé raps the spoken word segment of "Ghost" with robotic and reverbed vocals. Lyrically, "Haunted" contains sexually explicit and frank lyrics talking about desire. Many music critics compared its sound with various artists and noted different influences and elements explored in its composition. Upon its release, the song was met with positive reviews, with critics praising its experimental sound and minimalistic approach.

Two accompanying music videos were filmed for both parts of the song and placed separately on the visual album. The clip for "Ghost" was directed by Pierre Debusschere while Jonas Åkerlund served as the director for the second part, "Haunted". The former visual shows various close-up shots of Beyoncé lip-syncing the lyrics, while the latter features her walking in the corridor of a big mansion meeting various actors seen inside the rooms. Critics compared the video of "Haunted" and the singer's look with works by Madonna, most notably with her song "Justify My Love" (1990). The song was performed live during the last European leg of The Mrs. Carter Show World Tour and at the On the Run Tour in 2014. Beyoncé also performed it at the 2014 MTV Video Music Awards as part of a medley consisting of songs from her fifth studio album.

== Background ==
The things people say in those meetings would take your breath away. After a while, I didn't even feel like I was talking to people anymore, I was just talking to chairs. So I went home, it was five in the morning, and I just started typing shit out—everything I hear on the radio isn't inspiring; I'm not inspired by anything I'm doing; these people have no idea what's happening. It was just a stream-of-consciousness. I woke up the next day and realized I needed to do something with that. That's what eventually became that rap.

— Boots discussing the writing process of "Ghost"

"Haunted" was written and produced by Beyoncé and New York-based musician Boots, who was relatively unknown before the release of Beyoncé (2013). He was signed to Roc Nation, about six months prior to the album's release and produced 85% of Beyoncé also having writing credits on four of its tracks. During an interview with Pitchfork Media, Boots revealed that "Haunted" was the first song written by him which Beyoncé heard; it was originally titled "I'm Onto You" at that time. Beyoncé liked the song upon hearing it, leaving Boots confused as he felt the song was only showcasing his sad vocals, with a piano recorded on his iPhone as a voice memo.

He also played her the rap of stream of consciousness of "Ghost" during one of their early meetings inspired by an infuriating meeting with a record label. Beyoncé could immediately connect to the topic as she had also experienced the same things in the record industry when people advised her about the sound of her music. For the music of "Ghost", Boots created a beat from a "dreamlike, hypnotic place" working with guitars and building layers inspired by the work of musician Aphex Twin. Boots said, "[Aphex Twin's] works like that are more floaty, more without than within, but I made mine grounded in that thumping beat, so you can't get out of that feeling." He also elaborated about its concept, "It's like that song is leading you by the hand, but you're blindfolded and you don't know where you're going. You're scared and you're not sure what to expect from it, but as the album unfolds, we take the blindfold off and you realize it's a surprise party for you."

Beyoncé also explained the meaning of "Haunted" on her iTunes Radio channel where she also revealed her admiration for Boots, "The song is really about temptation in this music industry and being exposed to this crazy madness." The vocal production of the song was handled by Beyoncé and contains background vocals provided by Boots and Kwane Wyatt. "Haunted" was recorded at Jungle City Studios and Oven Studios, both located in New York City under the guidance of Boots and Stuart White. It was later mixed by Tony Maserati and White at Mirrorball Studios in North Hollywood. The track was eventually mastered by Tom Coyne and Aya Merril in Sterling Sound in New York City. All instruments were provided by Boots, with additional drum programming by Hit-Boy.

== Composition ==
"Haunted" is a two-part song, consisting of "Ghost" and "Haunted" collectively running for a length of approximately six minutes. Its composition was described as ranging from contemporary R&B to "straight up experimentalism". Mojo's Priya Elan compared the song's composition with works by English band The xx. The song features sexually explicit and frank lyrics in line with a prominent theme of the album about sexuality also present in other songs. Its instrumentation consists of "murky" keyboards and a "creeping", pulsating bassline. Beyoncé sings over mournful piano stabs which are repeated along with drums and airy vocals along with a pounding club rhythm.

"Ghost" is an ambient song with dubstep beats featuring Beyoncé rapping with recessed and reverbed vocals. The song contains ambient beats, bass and percussion and a poetic spoken word vocal with high loop. It was created by using a minimal approach and a falsetto vocal was applied along with various "warped, ghost-ly" effects. "Ghost" opens with an audio recording of the singer winning a Sammy Davis Jr. Award in 1989 in Houston for a townwide talent show. It continues with a person incorrectly pronouncing her name as "'Bee Awnz' [sic] Knowles". According to Spin columnist Brandon Soderberg, the song begins with a "random, frustrating indignity from her youth into a full-blown, racially loaded origin story" and also features expressions of her celebrity. Lyrically, Beyoncé makes a prediction about her album's sales and offers commentary on record labels through a spoken word intro: "I don't trust these record labels, I'm tourin'" and later adds, "Soul not for sale/Probably won't make no money off this/Oh well." Speaking about the record industry, she sings about being bored with labels during the lines, "All the shit I do is boring / All these record labels... boring". The lyrics of the song also discuss the failure of taking risks in the music industry. She also expresses sadness for people having to work banal and monotonous jobs in the lines, "All these people on the planet/Workin' nine to five just to stay alive/How come?".

Soderberg felt that the fast conversational vocal style adopted by the singer was reminiscent of rapper Kendrick Lamar. Anupa Mistry of the same publication felt that she borrowed Lamar's "alien-robot cadence and sings in a pinched choral croon" which she further compared with Bat for Lashes. Una Mullally of The Irish Times wrote that the singer's "monotone" rapping is accompanied by "the flatness of the tone reflecting the repetition of labour". Janice Llamoca from HipHopDX compared the part where Beyoncé sings the line "oh well" with Kanye West's "shrug[s]". Greg Kot of the Chicago Tribune found the same line to be sarcastic. Sal Cinquemani from Slant Magazine described her vocals during the line as half-rapped and "half-shrug[ed] as if directly countering Scheinman's silver linings playbook". Rob Sheffield from Rolling Stone felt that the singer confessed she got "bored" with the "popstar routine" in "Ghost".

"Haunted"
A 26-second sample of the second part of "Haunted", a dance-pop, hip-hop, and R&B track about sexual desire

During the end, "Ghost" quickly transitions into "Haunted", which is a hip-hop and R&B track. Kitty Empire of The Observer described it as a dance-pop track talking about "being haunted in love". Instrumentally, it consists of percussion and an off-kilter club beat which was compared with Jacques Greene and Burial. Its sound is operatic and the lyrics undersung, with piano chords and various rhythmic effects, such as foot-tapping. Lyrically, it talks about desire, with Ryan Dennehy from AbsolutePunk noting it was about "frank sexual desires". The Village Voice's Brittany Spanos felt the song was discussing lingering memories of the past. Trent Wolbe of The Verge compared the sound of "Haunted" with music by bands The Knife, Sade and Boards of Canada. Andrew Barker from Variety found a trance genre similar to Madonna's Bedtime Stories. The song includes sexual lyrics that are reflected throughout the album, including, "The bedroom's my runway / Slap me! / I'm pinned to the doorway / Kiss, bite, foreplay" and "My wicked tongue / Where will it be?" set to "sonorous... and chilly charged beats".

== Critical reception ==
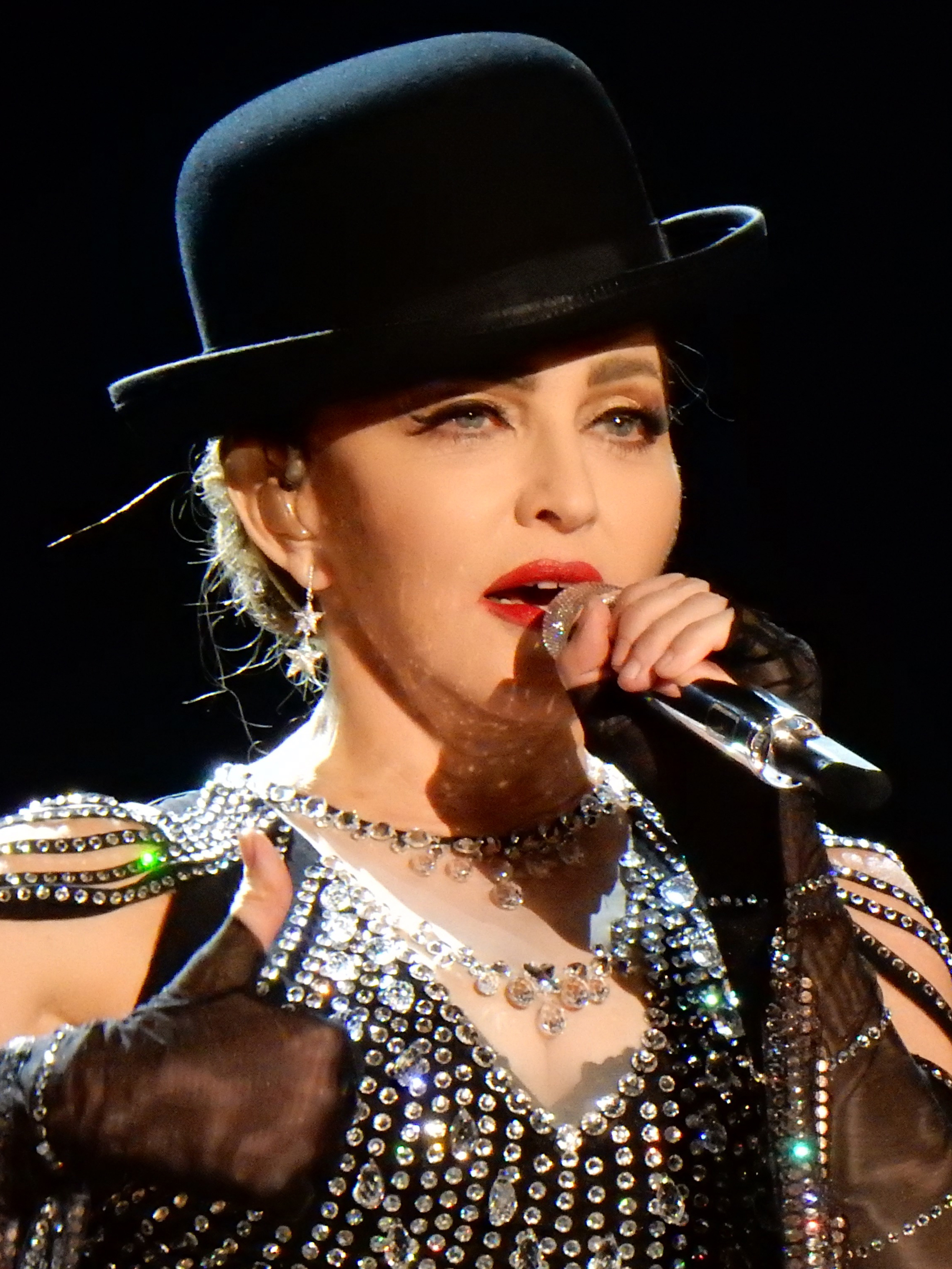
While reviewing "Haunted", many critics noted similarities to several of Madonna's songs, most frequently comparing it to "Justify My Love" (1990).

"Haunted" was well received by music critics. Neil McCormick of The Daily Telegraph felt that the "modernist sonic approach is pushed to the fore" on "Ghost". Spin's Brandon Sorderberg felt that the line "nine-to-five" just to stay alive" was repeated "way too many times". Anupa Mistry of the same publication described the song as "multi-directional, mood-shifting". Cosmopolitan's Alex Rees said the song is a "sharp critique of postmodern culture, except then all of a sudden there's a bunch of nasty sex talk." Mesfin Fekadu from the Associated Press described "Haunted" as a "gloomy" song. Writing for the website The 405, editor White Caitlin felt the singer offered part of her insecurities and flaws through the song and "sheds slut-shaming, the shackled role of uptight matriarch or calculated star". Fact's Chris Kelly described its composition as "foreboding" and found a "seductive" and "haunting" hook; he further described the first part as "smoky ethereality". Mojo's Priya Elan felt that some of the lines were a "nihilistic streak". In a review for The Quietus, Mof Gimmers described "Haunted" as a "perfect slice of vanguard-pop". Greg Kot of the Chicago Tribune described it as a "two-part dream". Robert Leedham of the website Drowned in Sound felt that the album's "confessional moments are when you connect with it the most", exemplifying the statement with lyrics from "Haunted". Andrew Hampp and Erika Ramirez of Billboard magazine felt that "Haunted" was one of the best songs on the album along with being "[the] most insightful [one]". They concluded that while the song was "one of the album's most staunchly non-commercial moments, but endlessly listenable just the same". Nick Catucci from Entertainment Weekly chose "Haunted" as one of the best songs from the album, describing it as a "moody, genre-melding epic" and noting, "[it] treat[s] relationships with the same raw instinct that suffuses her sex songs". AllMusic reviewer Andy Kellman also chose "Haunted" as one of the highlights on Beyoncé. Una Mullally of The Irish Times deemed "Haunted" the best song on the album and an indicator of the prominent minimalism throughout the whole record.

AbsolutePunk writer Ryan Dennehy remarked in his review that "ethereal echoes" of the singer's voice "elevate it above just a post-Weeknd, dark update to staid topics". Philip Matusavage of musicOMH described the sound of "Ghost" as "sleek ambient" dubstep, adding that it sounded typical for the singer and served as a "Beyoncé manifesto". He concluded his review by stating that if the references to disagreements Beyoncé talked about in the song were real, "the result proves to be the most sonically adventurous album of Beyoncé's career." Julia Leconte writing for Now praised Beyoncé's vocals as "perfect". Exclaim!'s Ryan B. Patrick felt that the song's minimalistic sound allowed the singer to "ironically champion artistic integrity and proclaim her thoughts on the industry". Chris Bosman from the website Consequence of Sound who felt that the song was the record's "mood setter" and contained "ghostly vibes", wrote that it "dabbles in R&Burial, Evian Christ's drag-influenced codeine hip-hop, and Nothing Was the Same's Xanax club rap". He felt that during the lines "Slap me, I'm pinned to the doorway / Kiss, bite, foreplay", Beyoncé "slides" the last word, making the song sound "even less radio friendly". Bosman further stated that "Haunted" along with "Partition" and "Mine", "are confident enough to take one, two, three left turns while maintaining thematic cohesion." The Guardian journalist Michael Cragg compared the song with works by Janelle Monáe and described its sound as "doom-laden". Ryan E.C. Hamm from Under the Radar magazine felt that "It's remarkable to hear a pop star at the height of her arena-tour powers taking chances like 'Haunted,' a dirge of a song that behaves more as spoken word until its 'Vogue'-y breakdown".

Having described the track as "eerie", Jason Newman from Fuse added it was suitable for softcore pornography with the singer being "in her best coo". He further described it as an erotic ballad and a "slow, creeping burn", noting that it sounded like Trent Reznor remixing Madonna's "Justify My Love". Claire Lobenfeld from Complex magazine described it as Beyoncé's version of "Justify My Love". Joey Guerra from the Houston Chronicle described the song as "ominous". In a review of the song, Randall Roberts of the Los Angeles Times compared its break with Madonna's work during Ray of Light with a chopped and screwed sound characteristic for Houston. Melissa Locker from Time magazine stated that the lyrics of the song were one of the "best humblebrags ever" while also noting that they hinted at the singer "dabbling in fiction". USA Today writer Elysa Gardner wrote that in "Haunted" along with another song on the album, "Jealous", the singer "embodies success and privilege on the surface, but there is a sense that her contentment is fragile". Korina Lopez of the same publication stated that she seemed "surprisingly in touch with the 9-to-5 grind, echoing her own career frustration". MTV News writer James Montgomery felt that Beyoncé showcased a "newfound sense of self" on the "cold, coital" song. Tim Finney of Complex magazine considered "Ghost" "a collision of opposites... less a song than a transfixing eye-hole glimpse into another, entirely separate world the singer could inhabit if she chose". Deeming the song a "[c]reepy mood piece", Jody Rosen of Vulture noted a lack of a music hook. In the annual Pazz and Jop mass critics poll of the year's best in music in 2013, "Haunted" was ranked at number 228.

== Music videos ==
Music videos for both "Ghost" and "Haunted" were released on December 13, 2013 through the iTunes Store on Beyoncé itself along with a clip for every other track on the album. Todd Tourso served as the creative director for both of the visuals as well as the rest of the album's videos. On November 24, 2014 the videos for "Ghost" and "Haunted" were uploaded to the singer's Vevo account.

=== "Ghost" ===
The music video for "Ghost" was directed by Belgian director Pierre Debusschere. Beyoncé is seen wearing a swimsuit by Seafolly with a nude mesh midsection and her look is also complete with red lips. While creating the video for "Pretty Hurts", she sent a note to director Melina Matsoukas requesting from her to include footage from her childhood as the clip was meant to connect to the next one on the album, "Ghost". The video opens with a close-up shot of Beyoncé's face lip-syncing the song's lyrics. Various shots of the singer with different outfits and placed at different sets are featured. Other scenes show dancers with their whole body covered in a white clothing.

According to the architecture firm Elenberg Fraser, the skyscraper Premier Tower under its construction on 134 Spencer Street in Melbourne, Australia was designed drawing inspiration by Beyoncé's look in the music video for "Ghost". Writing for MTV, John Walker wrote that Beyoncé "serves multiple levels of Martha Graham realness" in the video for "Ghost". Lindsey Weber from the website Vulture compared the dancer seen in the video with a "bodysock" one from Yeezus. Neil McCormick of The Daily Telegraph felt that the singer looked "perfect" in a bikini in the song's music video. Insanul Ahmed of Complex praised her look as "sexy". A writer from The New York Times described the singer's look in the video as "minimalist". Brent DiCrescenzo of the magazine Time Out called the video a "Cover Girl ad with full-body condoms". Whitney Phaneuf of the website HitFix compared it with Comme des Garçons and found a "deadpan expression of a model". Michelle Collins from Vanity Fair wrote in her review that the video was "jarring as it is soul-crushing". Jody Rosen from Vulture felt that the clip "has its moments, mostly involving billowing fabric". Michael Zelenko from The Fader praised the director's work on the video and remarked it included "stark portraits of a blase Beyonce, slithering, perching and dancing against black and white backgrounds". While reviewing the album, Emily Mackay of NME talked about the video for "Ghost",

"Some joyous shagging songs, though, are paltry excitement beside that of seeing an artist of such fame, long held as iconic without enough genuinely exciting music to back it up, reach her full throttle of awesomeness. The video for 'Ghost' sums it up best, Beyonce glaring and writhing defiantly as she speak-sings 'I'm climbing up the wall ’cause all the shit I hear is boring/All the shit I do is boring/All these record labels boring'. Let's hope Beyonce keeps finding new ways to amuse herself – there could be some very interesting times ahead."

==== Impact ====
The song inspired Australian company Elenberg Fraser to construct a two-hundred-and-twenty-six-metre-high skyscraper in Melbourne, Australia that features a curvaceous form taken from the music video.

=== "Haunted" ===
==== Background ====
The music video for "Haunted" was directed by Swedish film and music video director Jonas Åkerlund and styled by Dagmarette Yen and B. Åkerlend. It was shot using four cameras and in a period of two days. On November 15, 2013, Popjustice reported that one of the actors who was featured in the video, J-Hustle, shared a picture on his Twitter account while being on a five-day set for the filming. He added that a song with "a slow vibe" was played in the background during the shooting and that its potential name was "Ghost Haunted". Beyoncé first discussed about the video with Åkerlend during a concert she had in Stockholm in 2013. Having invited him for the performance, the singer played several songs for the director afterwards and the pair went on to exchange several ideas about its concept. During an interview with Vulture, Åkerlund talked about the process:

"It was not like a solid plan of 'This is what I think we should do.' It was a pretty long process. And she was traveling and touring, so we had time to bounce ideas back and forth, figure out what the best vision was. And meanwhile, she was shooting all these other videos and I wasn't really involved in what those other ideas were."

He noted that several ideas of the video which were initially conceived were similar with "other videos that people were working on" and also explained that the video contained many sexually explicit scenes and ideas when initially shot. However, he felt that the team managed to balance between the singer's look, her performance and a strong idea along with several other things. Åkerlund further noted that its concept remained largely unchanged as none of the big ideas were excluded. Beyoncé conceived some of the initial ideas behind the looks and the scenarios for many of the rooms which were eventually shot. Her look remained largely the same as the director pictured it before the filming of the video had started.

On December 2, 2014, a behind-the-scenes video consisting of footage from the making of the video for "Haunted" and "Superpower" with commentary by Jonas Åkerlund was released online. In the clip, he explained how both videos were slightly different compared to the singer's previous work as they contained less choreography. He went on saying the video for "Haunted" had a "cinematic" and "surreal" tone inspired by its music, further comparing it with a score for a movie. He concluded that the team had "all the elements to create something special"

==== Synopsis ====
A still from the music video for "Haunted" in which Beyonce is seen walking along a corridor in a mansion. The video's set and the singer's style were compared to that of Madonna in her video "Justify My Love" (1990)

The video opens with a three-second film countdown and proceeds with shots of several empty rooms and televisions in a big mansion. Most of the scenes were shot at the Villa de Leon. Beyoncé is seen driving a car and eventually arriving at the mansion while a song is played in the background. She enters inside the building with two luggages embellished with the letter "B" and throws her coat on the ground while a servant is seen lighting a cigarette she had previously taken from her hair. He hands her a key and the singer is seen climbing up the stairs. As she arrives in the hallway on the second floor, the song starts playing in the background and Beyoncé starts a journey, looking from room to room as she goes forward in the corridor.

In the various rooms, she meets men wearing vest tops with their faces painted white with black eyes staring at her as she passes down the corridor. Later she meets other people in leather and masks, before being surrounded by a troop of lace-clad dancers. One shot shows a man in colourful clothes and leopard print Speedos surrounded by bubbles in a bathtub. Another room contains a family of four mannequins in a 1960s-styled kitchen, preparing for a plastic-looking meal. A bare African-American is seen dancing and painting herself with a large brush while being almost naked. She is also seen with her legs spread around a TV screen and Beyoncé is seen on it, singing the song. During one scene, Beyoncé performs a dance choreography on a couch along with several other female dancers. Throughout the video, she is seen wearing a tuxedo with a tie, a white fur jacket and platform heels designed by Saint Laurent. The black-and-white jumpsuit she wears is designed by Russian designer Ulyana Sergeenko. Her look is further complete with dark make-up around the eyes and red lipstick while her hair is marcelled and blonde.

==== Reception ====
Anupa Mistry from Spin wrote that the location where the video was filmed was filled with "freaks and weirdos" to channel Madonna during the 1990s in a better way. Lauren Cochrane of The Guardian wrote in her review of the video that it was a "homage" to Madonna with the suit and marcel wave Beyoncé had. She added that anyone who watched the video for "Justify My Love", "knows that a hotel corridor is an excellent place to film a video" and went on to praise Beyoncé's looks and outfits. Kitty Empire of The Observer stated, "Less originally, the high-concept Haunted video finds Beyoncé in a posh hotel populated by sexually motivated freaks, with many shades of Madonna invoked." Bronwyn Barnes of Entertainment Weekly found similarities with the singer's look and Madonna's.

Whitney Phaneuf writing for the website HitFix felt that the video was a fit for the song's industrial sound and described the singer's look as "goth-glam". She concluded the scenes are quickly cut throughout the video, "never culminating in a linear narrative and forcing the viewer to fill in the blanks". Sharing what he perceived to be "key" moments in each of the seventeen music videos, Walker of MTV identified one for "Haunted" where Beyoncé "begins to crack under the pressures of her iconic status". Jon Dolan of Rolling Stone described the video for the song as the "[c]reppiest" on the album. A writer from The New York Times focused on the singer's look in the video, saying that she portrayed a fashionista. Randal Roberts of Los Angeles Times also provided a positive review for her "stunning" look while smoking a cigarette. Brent DiCrescenzo of Time Out described the video as "Stanley Kubrick meets Robert Palmer". Michelle Collins of Vanity Fair noted the scary atmosphere of the video and described the singer's look as "straight-up 1920s glamour" with a hair styled similar to Josephine Baker. Collins went on to compare it with the opening credits of American Horror Story and found "[n]ightmarish images strung together in one very long, very creepy sequence of Beyoncé looking for her hotel room".

Andrew Hampp and Erika Ramirez from Billboard magazine compared the video with Madonna's work and American Horror Story, concluding "[t]he spine-tinglingly glam... video for this track is worth Beyoncé's case for making this a simultaneous visual-and-audio experience alone". Describing the video as "scary", Lindsay Weber from Vulture further called it the singer's best impression of American Horror Story. Jason Newman from the website Fuse described the video as "equally frightening [as the song]; part Korean horror film, part Lynchian psychosexual fantasy." The Fader editor Michael Zelenko noted the clip presented a classic story where an "innocent guest [is] caught in ghost-infested hotel". Insanul Ahmed of Complex described the visual as "creepy". ABC News journalist Michael Rothman compared the video's opening with horror movies and The Ring in particular and went on to praise it overally as Beyoncé's "best yet". Trent Wolbe of The Verge criticized Åkerlund's work on the album, feeling that his contributions "feel like boring opulence porn", something he found on "Haunted".

== Live performances ==
"Haunted" was performed as the opening song for Beyoncé's first concert of the last European leg of The Mrs. Carter Show World Tour in Glasgow on February 20, 2014. The performance of the song featured backing dancers and strobing lights with the singer's look being completed by a glittery gown. Digital Spy's Robert Copsey felt that "Haunted" worked as a "brilliantly spooky opener". David Pollock from The Independent found a "thundering bass containing a heavy dubstep influence" during the performance of the song. Mark Savage from BBC News felt that the concert included various "unparalleled" vocal styles and ranges, including the "hushed and sultry" "Haunted". A professionally recorded live performance of the song from the tour aired on June 30, 2014, as the first episode of Beyonce: X10, an HBO series documenting renditions of the song performed during The Mrs. Carter Show World Tour. Anna Silman from Vulture discussed the performance saying that it was full of "kaleidoscopic visuals and headache-inducing strobe lights and fog to make you grateful you weren't there for the live performance (almost)".

The song was later also added to the set list of Beyoncé's co-headlining tour with Jay-Z, the On the Run Tour. During the performance, her look was complete with a drop-sleeve piece with black lace. While reviewing a concert of the show, Erica K. Landau of USA Today compared Beyoncé's look to Stevie Nicks. She went on to deem the song a highlight of the performance praising her "creamy" vocals in contrast with the other songs on the set list. Similarly, Dan DeLuca writing for Philadelphia Media Network considered the song to be a showcase of her vocals. Leila Cobo of the magazine Billboard considered the song to be a highlight of the show, showcasing the singer's "vocal prowess" and "her ability to connect as a singer and not just as a striking personality". In another concert review, Mikael Wood of the Los Angeles Times noted that the attention among the people in the crowd "drift[ed] noticeably during 'Haunted'" resulting in a mild reception of the song's performance.

At the 2014 MTV Video Music Awards, Beyoncé performed "Haunted" along with a medley of songs from her fifth studio album. It served as the second song of the set and it featured the singer dressed in a jewelled bodysuit created by Tom Ford. After concluding with "Mine" she announced "MTV, welcome to my world" and performed "Haunted" surrounded by smoke on stage. As she sang the song, Beyoncé was surrounded by dancers wearing bustiers, sleeves and face cages by fashion label Chromat. Nadeska Alexis of MTV News stated that the performance of the song was among the "most soul-baring of the night".

== Usage in media ==
In March 2014, "Haunted" was used during the screening of the film Fifty Shades of Grey at CinemaCon. On November 13, 2014, the song was used in the film's second trailer. In October 2015, Australian musician Flume appeared on the BBC Radio 1 Essential Mix show and released a remix of "Haunted". According to the architecture firm Elenberg Fraser, the skyscraper Premier Tower under its construction on 134 Spencer Street in Melbourne, Australia was designed drawing inspiration by Beyoncé's look in the music video for "Ghost".

== Credits and personnel ==
Credits adopted from the album's liner notes and the singer's official website.

Song credits

- Writing — Boots, Beyoncé Knowles
- Production — Boots, Knowles
- Vocal production — Knowles
- Recording — Boots and Stuart White; Jungle City Studios, Oven Studios, New York City
- Second engineering — Ramon Rivas
- Instrumentation — Boots
- Additional drum programming — Hit-Boy
- Background vocals — Boots
- Additional background vocals — Kwane Wyatt
- Audio mixing — Tony Maserati, Stuart White; Mirrorball Studios, North Hollywood, California
- Mix engineering — James Krausse, Justin Hergett
- Mix consulting — Derek Dixie
- Mastering — Tom Coyne, Aya Merril; Sterling Sound, New York City

"Ghost" video credits

- Director — Pierre Debusschere
- Creative director — Todd Tourso
- Director of photography — Stefan Duscio
- Executive producer — Erinn Williams, Ziggy Le Vin
- Producer — Keeley Could
- Production company — Art + Commerce, Parkwood Entertainment
- Choreography — Anthony Burrell
- Stylist — Karen Langley
- Additional styling — Ty Hunter, Raquel Smith, Tim White
- Dance — Shivawn Joubert
- Editor — Alexander Hammer
- Brand manager — Melissa Vargas
- Hair — Neal Farinah
- Make-up — Sir John
- Color correction — Rob Sciarratta
- Visual effects — Kroma
- Photography — Robin Harper

"Haunted" video credits

- Director — Jonas Åkerlund
- Director of photography — Pär Ekberg
- Director of photography (second unit) — Todd Heater
- Executive producer — Scott Horan
- Producer — Scott Pourroy
- Production company — Black Dog Films / Acme – Smith
- Choreography — Dana Foglia, Frank Gatson
- Dancers — HAannah Douglass, Ashley Everett, Kim Gingras, Mishay Petronelli
- Stylist — B. Åkerlund
- Additional styling — Ty Hunter, Raquel Smith, Tim White
- Other performers — Jasmond Carrol, Viet Dang, Dahlia Dark, Elle Evans, Kim Fowley, Megalo Jaxson, Josh Kanan, Amy Kingston, Ellen Leigh, Morgan Leigh, Maye Musk, Reese Nance-Gasnter, Louis Oberlander, Holly Redden, Jodie Smith, Dylan Stephens, Guetcha Tondreau, Edward Vigiletti
- Art director — Christina Zollenkopf
- Production designer — Emma Fairley
- Editor — Luis Moreno, Jeremiah Shuff
- Brand manager — Melissa Vargas
- Assistant editor — Joe Sinopoli
- Hair — Kim Kimble
- Make-up — Francesca Tolot
- Nails — Tom Bachik
- Color correction — Luis Moreno
- Visual effects — Kroma
- Photography — Nick Farrell

== Charts ==
Chart performance for "Haunted"
Chart (2014–2015)	Peak position
France (SNEP)	99
UK Singles (Official Charts)	158

== Certifications ==
Certifications for "Haunted"
Region	Certification	Certified units/sales
Brazil (Pro-Música Brasil)	Gold	30,000^{‡}
New Zealand (RMNZ)	Gold	15,000^{‡}
United Kingdom (BPI)	Silver	200,000^{‡}
United States (RIAA)	Platinum	1,000,000^{‡}
^{‡} Sales+streaming figures based on certification alone.
