= The Hungry Mile =

Docklands area in Sydney, New South Wales, Australia

Coordinates: 33°51′34.3″S 151°12′4.2″E

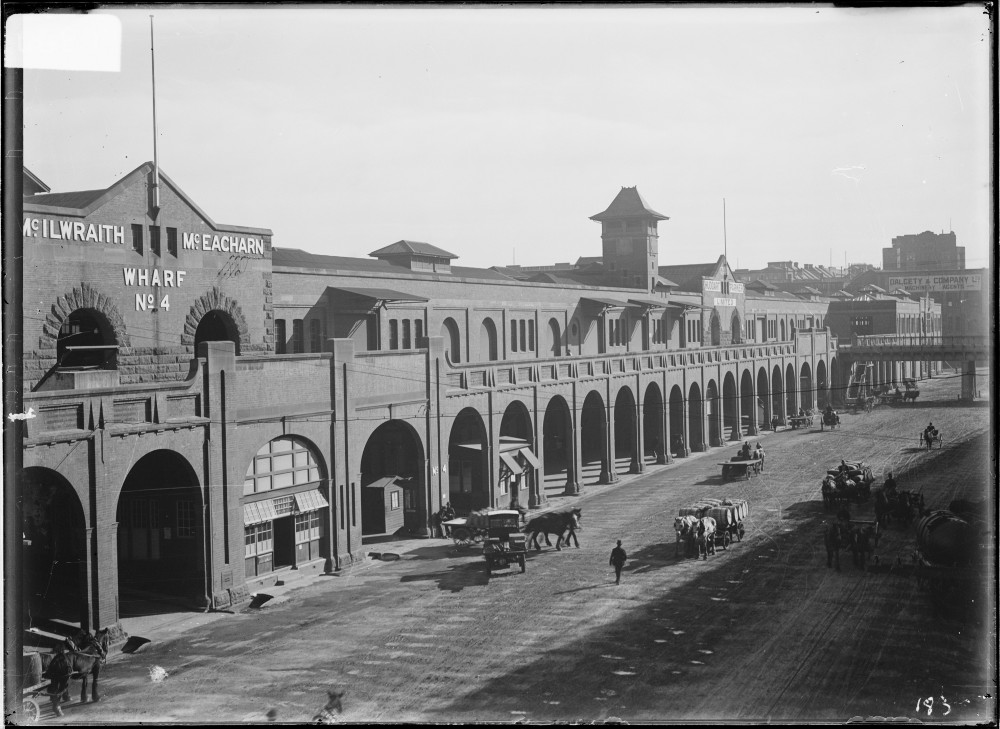
Wharves on Hickson Rd c.1920

The Hungry Mile is the name harbourside workers gave to the docklands area of Darling Harbour East, in Sydney, New South Wales, Australia in the Great Depression. Workers would walk from wharf to wharf in search of a job, often failing to find one. It is officially recognised as an Urban Place by the Geographical Names Board of New South Wales.

The system of day labour gave rise to similar conditions on many port areas, such as Melbourne's Wailing Wall.

== Redevelopment ==
The area was officially part of Millers Point. As stevedoring operations moved to ports at Port Botany and Port Kembla, the Government of New South Wales determined that this site should be renewed as an extension of the Sydney CBD with a significant new foreshore park providing recreational areas for a growing Sydney population.

In 2006, as part of the urban renewal plans, the State Government held a competition for the site's name. The Maritime Union of Australia campaigned to renew the "Hungry Mile" name, as an acknowledgement of the site's historical significance to waterside workers. The State Government named the area Barangaroo. The name honours Barangaroo, an important indigenous woman from Sydney's early history who was a powerful and colourful figure in the colonisation of Australia. She was also the wife of Bennelong, another important indigenous figure after whom Bennelong Point is named, the site of the Sydney Opera House. A section of Barangaroo, Hickson Road between the Munn Street overbridge and the Napoleon Street intersection, was officially designated the Hungry Mile in 2009.

== Popular culture ==
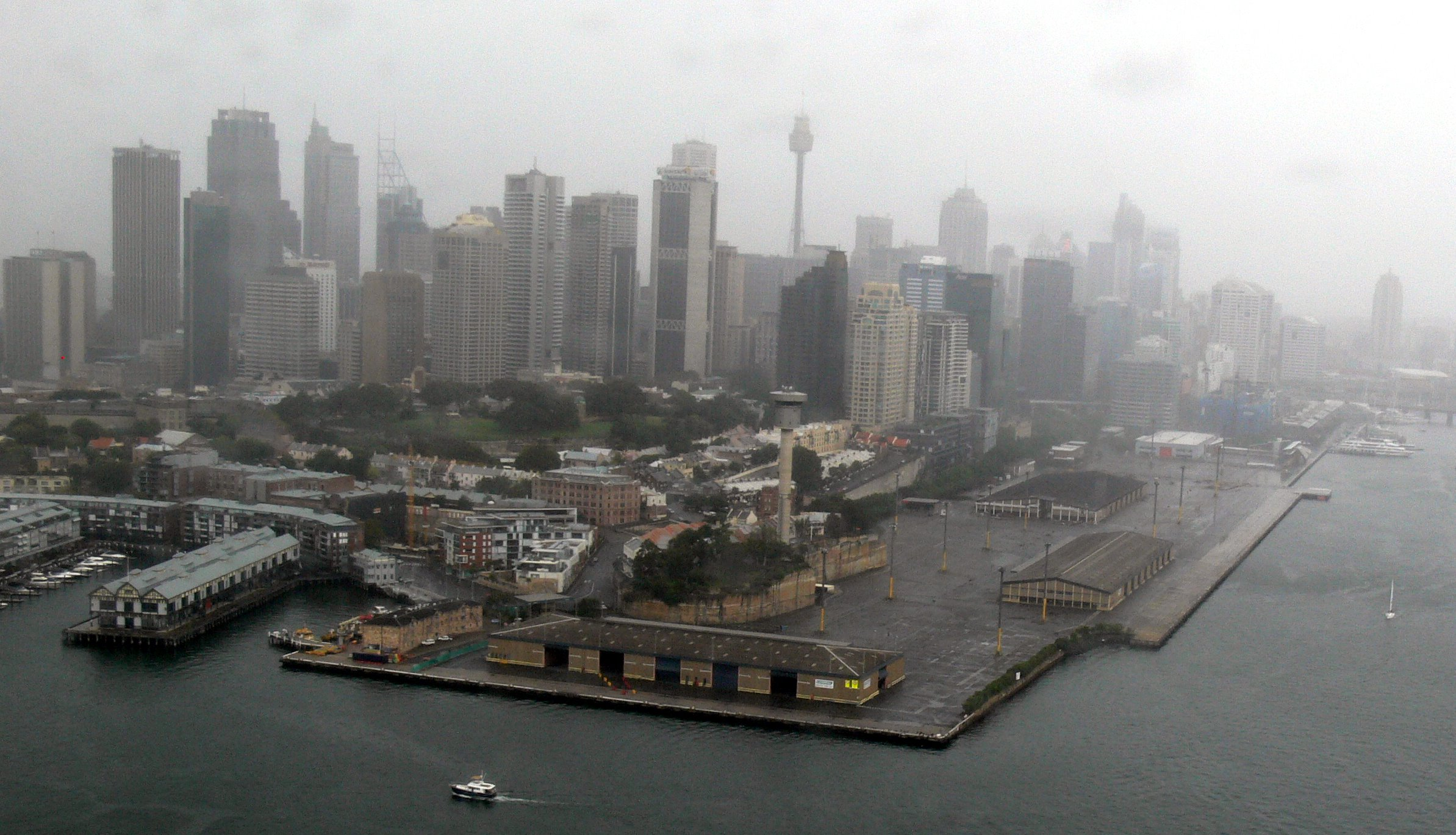
Barangaroo in the foreground, before shipping buildings were demolished

In 1930, The Hungry Mile was the title of wharfie poet Ernest Antony's most famous poem, in a published collection titled The Hungry Mile and other poems. Memories of the Hungry Mile and Antony's poem became the inspiration for the Waterside Workers' Federation Film Unit 1950s film of the same name.
