= SMEC Holdings =

Australian consulting firm

SMEC Holdings Limited
- Formerly: Snowy Mountains Engineering Corporation
- Type: Subsidiary
- Founded: June 24, 1970; 56 years ago
- Founder: Government of Australia
- Headquarters: Melbourne, Australia
- Area served: Global
- Key people: Hari Poologasundram (CEO)
- Services: Consulting
- Number of employees: 5,000 (2022)
- Parent: Surbana Jurong
- Website: www.smec.com

SMEC Holdings Limited (formerly Snowy Mountains Engineering Corporation) is an Australian based-firm that provides consulting services on major infrastructure projects around the world. SMEC undertakes feasibility studies, design, tender and contract management, construction supervision and project management. The company provides engineering services for transport, hydropower and energy, water and environment and resources projects. Its head office is located in Melbourne, Victoria. Founded by the Government of Australia, since 2016 it has been a subsidiary of Surbana Jurong.

== Background ==
Between 1949 and 1974 the Snowy Mountains Authority (SMA) undertook a massive hydro-electric and irrigation project, the Snowy Mountains Scheme, in the Snowy Mountains of New South Wales. The work included sixteen dams, seven power stations, 150 kilometres (93 mi) of tunnels, 80 kilometres (50 mi) of aqueducts, 2,000 kilometres (1,200 mi) and much other construction. It was completed on time and within budget. The work showcased Australian engineering, and in the 1960s the SMA was given projects in Thailand, Sabah, Papua New Guinea and Cambodia.

== History ==
In 1970 the Snowy Mountains Engineering Corporation (SMEC) was established to preserve and market the expertise that SMA had acquired. Many of the early projects were funded by the Australian International Development Assistance Bureau (AIDAB). By 1991, the Snowy Mountains Engineering Corporation (SMEC) was a public company with 220 staff. The company was wholly owned by the Government of Australia, and provided engineering consulting and project management services around the world. SMEC became a Commonwealth Government owned public company in 1989, and in 1993 SMEC was sold by the government in a management buyout.

In August 2016 SMEC was implicated in alleged corporate bribery incidents in both Sri Lanka and Bangladesh, after the firm sought to secure multi-million dollar contracts in those countries.

In August 2016, SMEC was bought by Singapore-based Surbana Jurong for around $400 million.
