= STH BNK by Beulah =

Skyscraper under development in Melbourne, Australia

Coordinates: 37.822597°S 144.963361°E

- STH BNK by Beulah towers, as proposed in 2018

General information
- Status: Never built
- Location: 60 Southbank Boulevard, Southbank, Victoria
- Construction started: 2024
- Completed: ~2029
- Cost: ~AUD$2 billion

Height
- Architectural: Tower 1: 366 m (1,200.8 ft); Tower 2: 251 m (823.5 ft)

Technical details
- Floor count: Tower 1: 102; Tower 2: 59

Design and construction
- Architects: UNStudio; Cox Architecture
- Developer: Beulah

Website
- sthbnk.com

STH BNK by Beulah, previously and still commonly referred to as Green Spine, was a dual skyscraper development proposed for Melbourne's Southbank precinct by Beulah International, and designed by the architectural firms UNStudio and Cox Architecture. The site previously hosted a BMW dealership. One tower was planned to reach a height of 366 metres, making it the tallest building in Australia. The design of both towers featured a twisting geometric glass façade and terracing with pocket parks and green spaces, up to a publicly accessible botanic garden in the tallest building. The project was to have served a range of mixed-use functions, including residential, retail and commercial.

== History ==
=== Site ===
The site for the development is 60 Southbank Boulevard, located in Southbank, an inner-city suburb of Melbourne, and is an amalgamation of two adjacent properties – 102–156 City Road and 158 City Road. The former property, with a land area of 6,191 m^{2} (66,639 sq ft), hosts a purpose-built multi-level car showroom which was BMW’s flagship sales store in Melbourne. In December 2017, Beulah International purchased the site from BMW for $101 million. In April 2021, Beulah acquired 158 City Road, with the intention of expanding the development. The 1,515 m^{2} (16,307 sq ft) site is currently home to Hanover House, a seven storey commercial building, the tallest in Southbank between 1973 and 1990. The purchase brought the total land area of the development to 7,706 m^{2} (82,947 sq ft), and the property is now an 'island' with four frontages: Power Street, City Road, Southbank Boulevard, and Waterfall Lane. The development will be situated in an area of Melbourne that has some of the tallest buildings in the city; for instance, the city's current tallest building, Australia 108, sits opposite the property at 70 Southbank Boulevard, whilst the previous tallest, Eureka Tower, is also in the vicinity.

=== Southbank competition ===
Beulah conducted a contest to determine the architect for the project, and dubbed the competition "STH BNK by Beulah". All six solicited bids involved two architectural firms, and partnerships included BIG Architects and Fender Katsalidis, Coop Himmelb(l)au with Architectus, MAD Studio and Elenberg Fraser, and Woods Bagot and MVRDV. The collaborative bid by UNStudio and Cox Architecture ultimately secured the commission. The winning design was announced in August 2018.

=== Project ===
The structure was part of the larger development on Melbourne's Southbank (suburb), estimated to cost AUD$2 billion. Green Spine composed of two skyscrapers; Tower 1 comprised 102 storeys and would have reached a height of 366 metres, surpassing the height of the current 2 tallest buildings in Australia, the Gold Coast’s Surfers Paradise’s Q1, which stands at 322 metres and the suburb’s (Southbank) Australia 108, which stands at 316 metres. The second tower comprised 59 storeys and a height of 251 metres; as with Tower 1, the second building included hotel rooms, residential apartments, and offices. Both skyscrapers will seem to curve in a twist and will have foliage and trees growing on balconies along their exteriors.

=== Approval ===
In March 2020, the plan received approval by the City of Melbourne. Planning Minister Richard Wynne approved the project on 23 April 2020; like other developments, STH BNK by Beulah was identified by the Victorian Government as a project needing to be "fast-tracked", amid the impact of the COVID-19 pandemic to the Victorian economy.

=== Administration and sale ===
In February 2025, the development management company BSSPV Pty Ltd was placed by Beulah into administration. The collapse came as the project owed more than $5 million in outstanding fees to various designers, consultants and lawyers, with project architects Cox Architecture and UNStudio filing a wind-up notice against it.

In April 2026, the project was formally shelved due to an inability to obtain additional financing to commence construction amid surging construction costs. The consolidated development site is due to be placed on the market later in 2026, with expectations that another developer will submit an amended or new design for approval.

== See also ==
- List of tallest buildings in Melbourne
- List of tallest buildings in Australia
