= Liberty Tower (Melbourne) =

Apartment building in Melbourne, Victoria

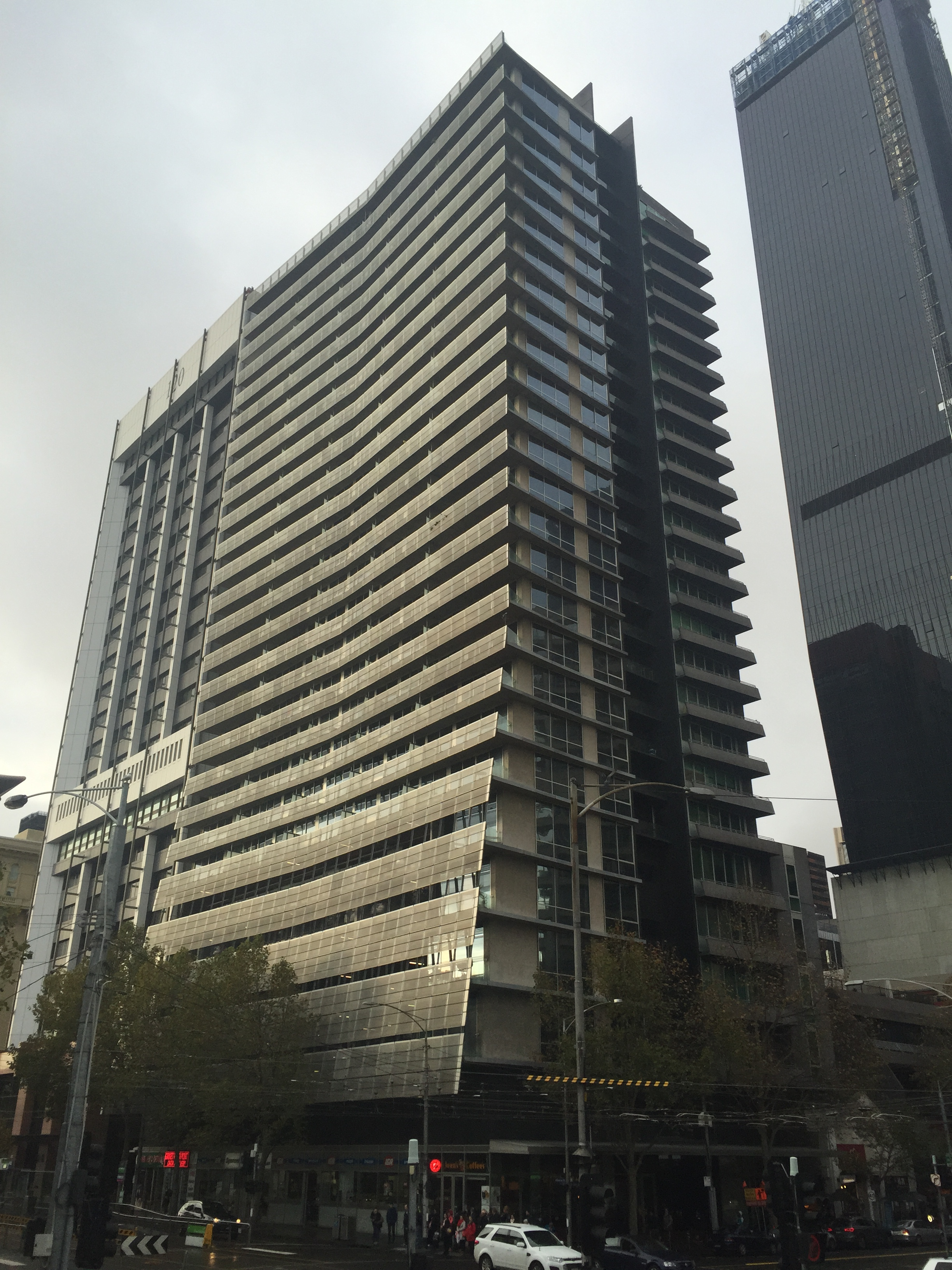
- Southern and western facades. Viewed from corner of Spencer and Collins Street.

General information
- Status: Completed
- Type: Residential apartment building, small business
- Location: 620 Collins Street, Melbourne
- Completed: 2002

Height
- Top floor: 93 metres (305 ft)

Technical details
- Floor count: 27

Design and construction
- Architect(s): Elenberg Fraser

The Liberty Tower is a 27-story high-rise residential building and small business tower located at 620 Collins Street on the corner of Collins and Spencer streets in the Melbourne central business district, Australia.

== Background ==
Liberty Tower is located in the "Gdansk" end of Collins street on the north eastern corner of the Collins Street and Spencer Street intersection. The tower was completed in 2002, and is the first project of Melbourne Architect firm Elenberg Fraser. Zahava Elenberg and Callum Fraser of Elenberg Fraser were awarded the commission in 1998 by the Melbourne City Council. At the time, both were still architecture students at RMIT University.

== Programming ==
The ground floor includes a number of convenience stores and shops. A secure carpark is located between podium and level 7.

The Tower consists of 237 apartments, which occupy levels 7 to 27, with 3 levels of sub-penthouses and one penthouse level. Level 7 includes a private gymnasium, spa and swimming pool for use by the tower's residents.

== Design features ==
Elenberg Fraser's first building was used as "an exercise in screening and the extruded site".

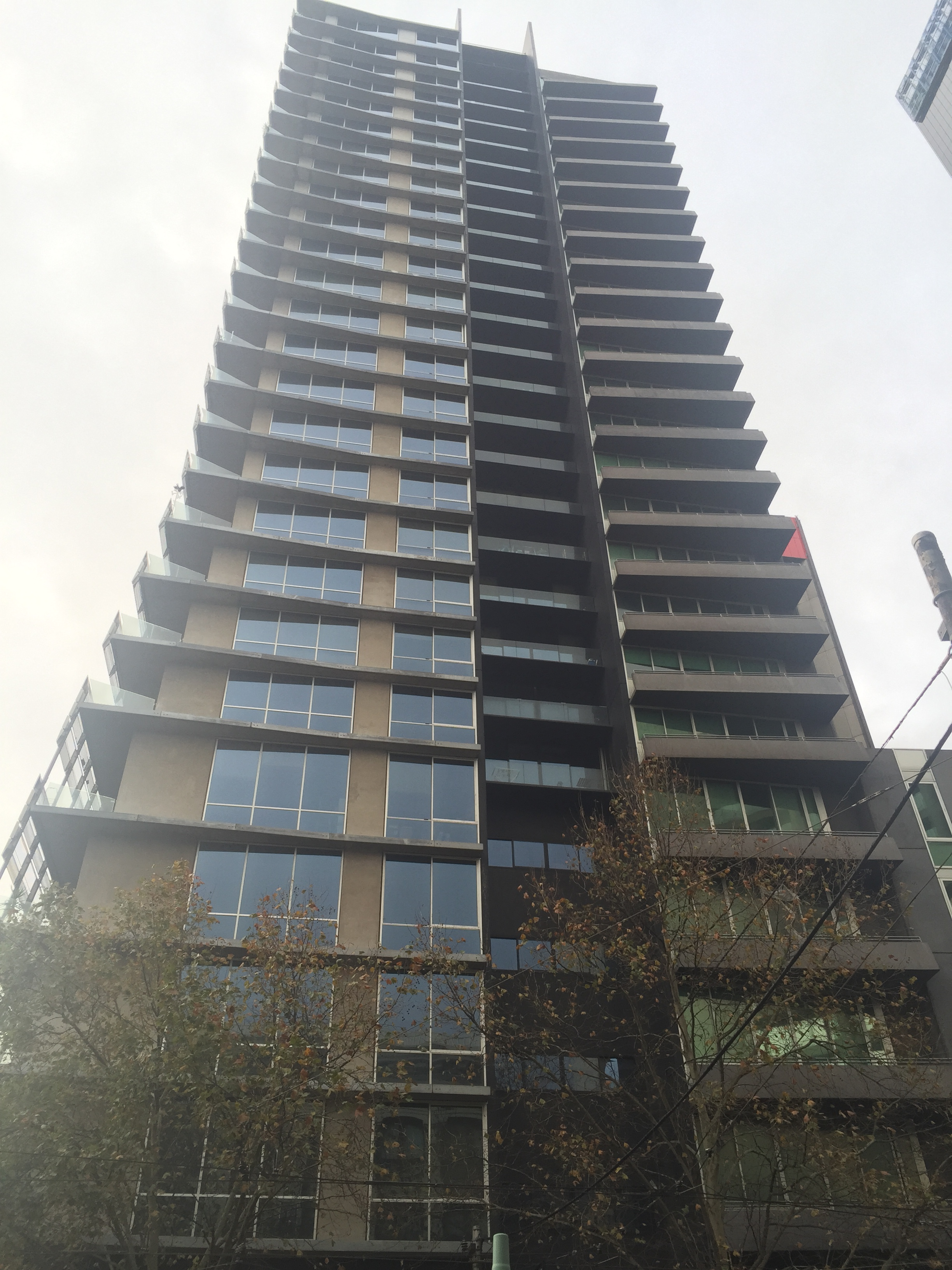
Southern facade (Collins Street side)

=== Influences ===
The façade references a building in collapse. "Appearing poised to slip off the building's angled façade, the perforated aluminium shows the angst and distress of the tower and its immediate environment." The mesh screens reference the Japanese obsession with industrial detailing.

=== Facade ===
The mid-rise Liberty Tower offers a different experience on each of its four sides: "Liberty Tower is a compendium of approaches to facade treatment: the west and east faces investigate conditions of regularity, the north side explores the use and aesthetic value of function, while the south is organized around a black core symbolically exposing the building's heartland."

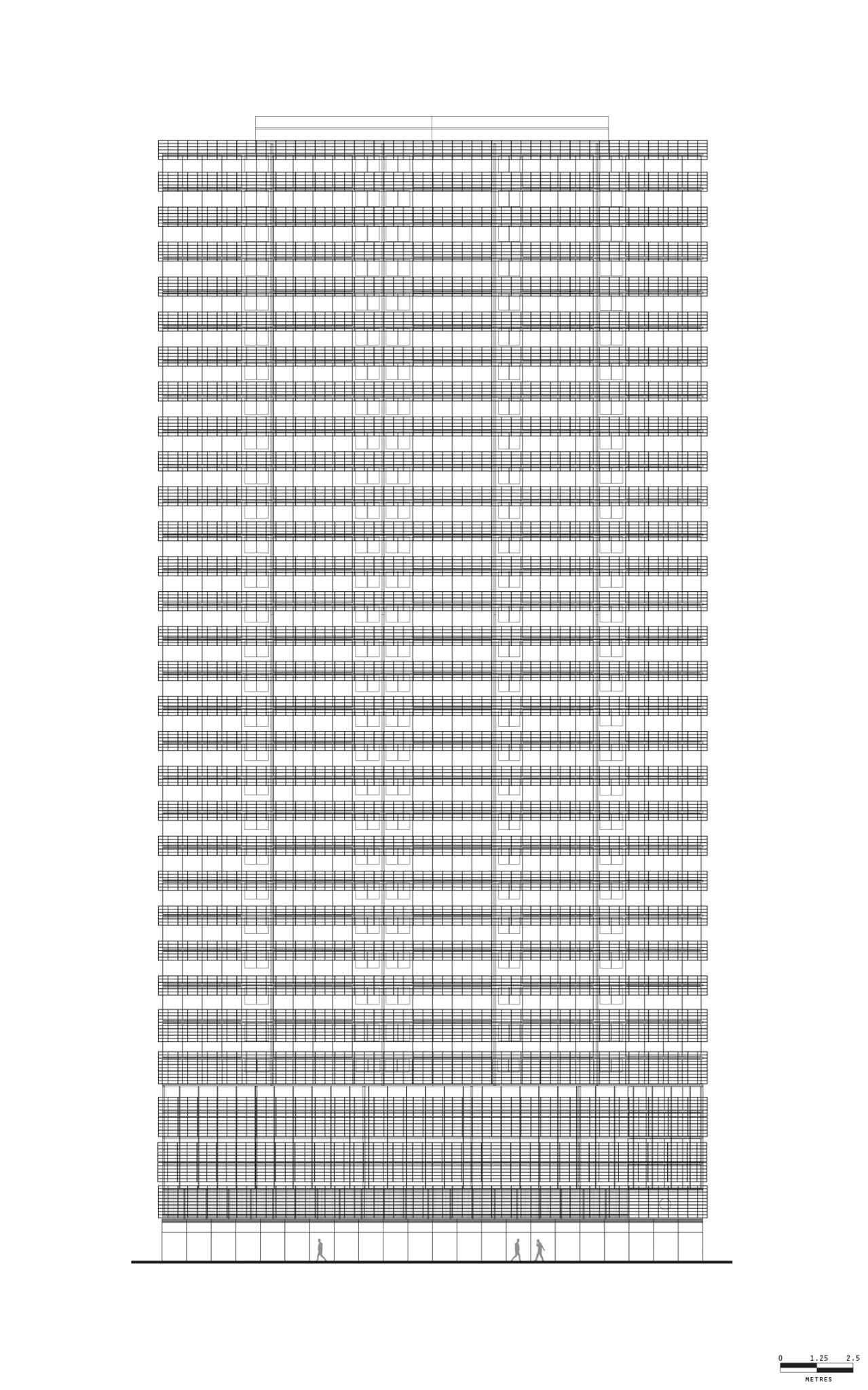
West elevation (Spencer Street)

The main façade shows a grid of perforated aluminium screens, including a vertical crease running down the full length of the facade. The North façade is raw, unfinished concrete resplendent with plywood markings and nail holes.

The Tower's facade encapsulates many of the ideas and driving forces that went into the project. The western end of Melbourne's central business district was seen at the time by the architects to be the "gritty underbelly" of Melbourne's central business district, and the perforated, aluminium, eastern facade of the tower was made to represent that. The dressed eastern facade is one which was designed to clearly define the separation between the central business district of Melbourne and the rougher western suburbs at the time the design was taking shape.

As Liberty Tower retreats into the central business district that its own facade defines as a "city-state" the need for the dividing border defined by the aluminium facade is lost and thus the modernist, architectonic skeleton behind the western facade is revealed in the north and south facades. the horizontal striated motif defined by the perforated aluminium skin is continued around the corner to the north and south by the exposed, projected floor plates but the horizontality is broken by the three distinct sections of verticality representing the apartments on the western half, a central hallway typical of "H-tower block form" and the balconies of the apartments on the eastern half of the tower.

=== Foyer ===
The walls in the residential foyer are clad in reflective glass and stainless steel panels, set under a white ceiling (originally meant to be black). The only object in the lobby is a fluorescent light installation by Stephen Bram.

=== Environmental features ===
The raking perforated aluminium screen façade is designed to reduce air-conditioning loads within the building as the screens protect the building from the western sun.

== Similar works ==
A lineage of formal language can be traced from Elenberg Fraser's treatment of Liberty Tower through their immediately following work to their more recent projects. The Westgate apartments, completed in 2005, can be viewed as a further development in the use of a perforated metal skin. Elenberg Fraser's projects, A'beckett Street Tower, Abode 318, Sky Lofts, Light House, 50 Albert Road, Victoria 1 and Tower Melbourne can all be seen as a continuation on the idea of a rippling facade, a theme birthed in the vertical crease of the western facade of Liberty Tower.
