= Wailing Wall (Melbourne) =

Coordinates: 37.821341°S 144.953592°E

The Wailing Wall is a section of brick retaining wall on the Flinders Street Extension, Melbourne, which is famous as the place where Wharf labourers who missed out on the daily work call would congregate.

== Description ==
The wall is approximately 220 m long, rising to 5.5 m high at its centre with bluestone coping. It has been breached for a stairway and has an enclosed glass walkway bridge across it connecting to the Melbourne World Trade Centre. The bridge was constructed as part of Melbourne's Temporary Casino. The western end has been truncated for Wurundjeri Way.

== Construction ==
Flinders Street Extension was constructed in 1890, as part of improvements to railway, road and wharf facilities west of Melbourne's CBD. The wall comprises a polychrome brick facing in red, brown and yellow Hawthorn bricks gently rising from the Flinders Street Viaduct near Spencer Street to the high point at the south end of the former Batman's Hill to then falling again to the west, where the entrance to the Spencer Street Railway Yards and No 2 Goods Shed, was once located. Most of Batmans Hill was removed in 1863-65 for development of Spencer Street railway station, with the remaining arts removed in March 1892.

== Wharf labour pickup ==
From about 1900 to the 1940s, work on the wharves was obtained through the bull system of labour hire, where workers assembled twice a day at the stevedores offices on the south side of Flinders Street. The system forced wharf labourers to compete against each other for work, be chosen for work 'on the basis of brute strength, and, sometimes, compliance. Those who missed out on the call were forbidden from loitering and sometimes moved on by the police. As a result, the habit of congregating on the opposite side of the road against the wall developed. A similar system operated in Sydney along The Hungry Mile. In 1917, waterside workers went on strike over the issue of the pick-up and demanded the establishment of a single central pick-up point at the Flinders Street extension and that their remuneration should include the time taken to travel to and from their assigned ships. The impending arrival of strikebreakers from Sydney resulted in the calling off of the strike and abandonment of the dispute about a central pick-up.

The notorious 'Flinders Street Extension murder' in 1947 was indicative of the violence of the docks in the mid 20th century. An unknown assailant shot dead Yeung Shing, the bosun of the ship SS Fort Abitibi, and seriously wounded Albert Sydney Pack.

Following the formation of the Melbourne Harbour Trust in 1876, Sir John Coode was engaged to develop a scheme to improve Melbourne's Port. Along with the creation of the Coode Canal and Victoria Dock, the plan emphasised the need for a main road linking the river wharves. The Flinders Street Extension was constructed to meet that need, and the wall was built where the road cut through what was left of Batman's Hill, a site closely associated with Melbourne's foundation.

== Surrounding features ==
A plaque on the wall commemorates the location of John and Eliza Batman's House, built in 1835. The Plaque was unveiled by the Premier Rupert Hamer in 1977. Opposite is the Mission to Seamen building and the first Melbourne World Trade Centre.

The Flinders Street tram line was extended along the Extension to link up with the docklands lines in 2000.

== See also ==
- Port of Melbourne
- History of Melbourne Docklands
