= No. 1 Brisbane =

Residential skyscraper in Brisbane, Queensland

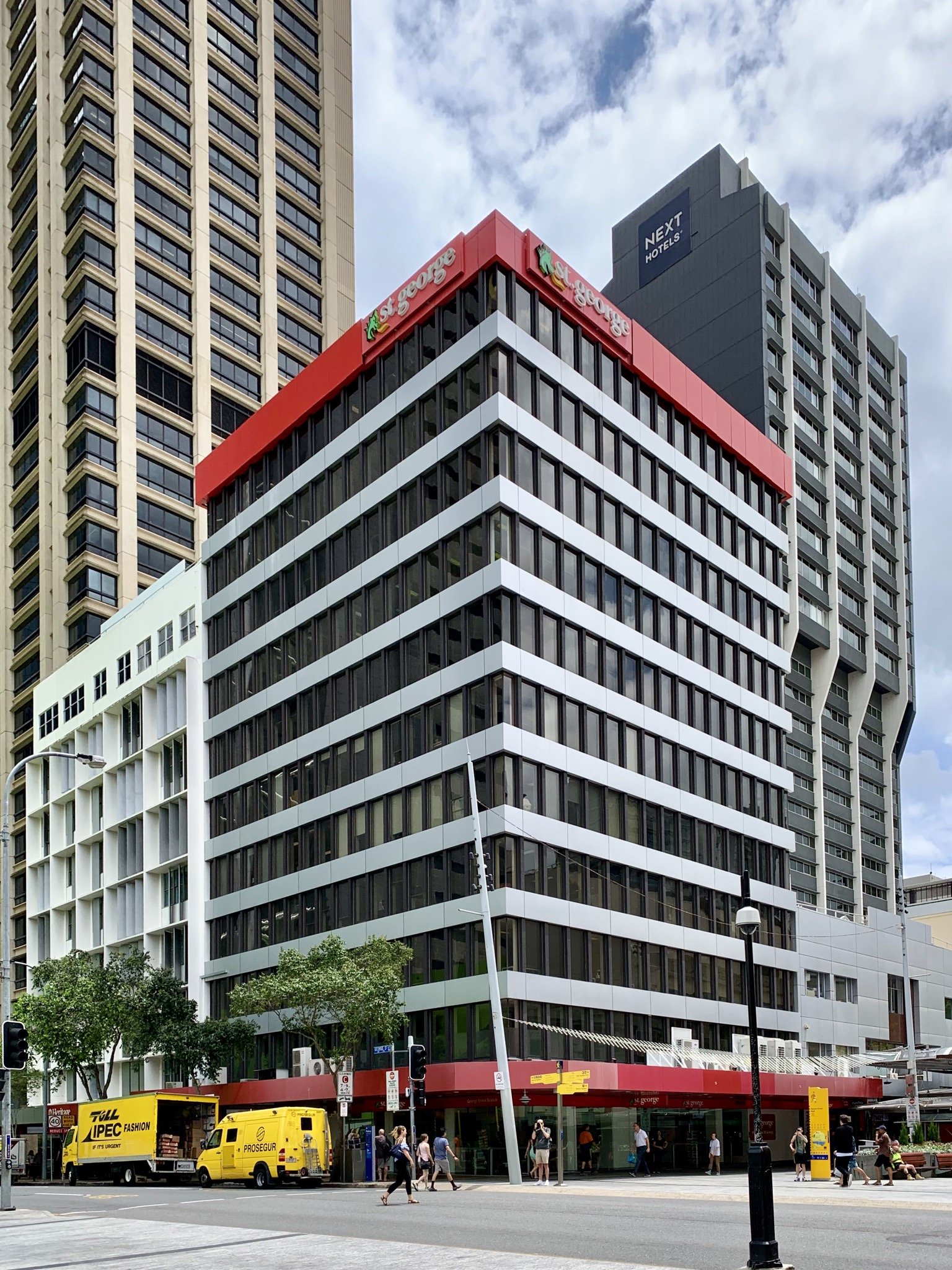
- Current buildings at the site

General information
- Status: Approved
- Type: Residential/Retail
- Location: Brisbane, Queensland, Australia, 217-235A George Street and 52-58 Queen Street

Height
- Roof: 274.3 metres (900 ft)

Technical details
- Floor count: 82
- Lifts/elevators: 12

Design and construction
- Architect: Blight Rayner Architecture
- Developer: 151 Property Core Plus Management Limited
- Quantity surveyor: Bennett & Bennett Consulting Surveyor

The No. 1 Brisbane is a future residential skyscraper to be located at 217–235A George Street on the corner with 52–58 Queen Street in Brisbane, Australia. The tower will rise to 274.3m (274m AHD) which is currently the maximum height allowed in Brisbane central business district.

Retail space is planned for all four levels of the podium, fronting streets and laneways on all four sides of the tower. The 82-storey tower will include 534 apartments; 120 one bedroom, 284 two bedroom, 108 three bedroom, 20 four bedroom apartments and 2 penthouses. Recreation areas with swimming pool, gymnasium, function rooms and sun deck will be located on levels 5, 31–33, 54–55 and 73–74. The 12 levels basement will include 390 car park spaces and concierge drop off area.

Development application, lodged with the Brisbane City Council in June 2017, was approved in December 2017.

== See also ==
- List of tallest buildings in Brisbane
