= Light House Melbourne =

Residential skyscraper in Melbourne, Australia

Coordinates: 37°48′30.1″S 144°57′39.0″E

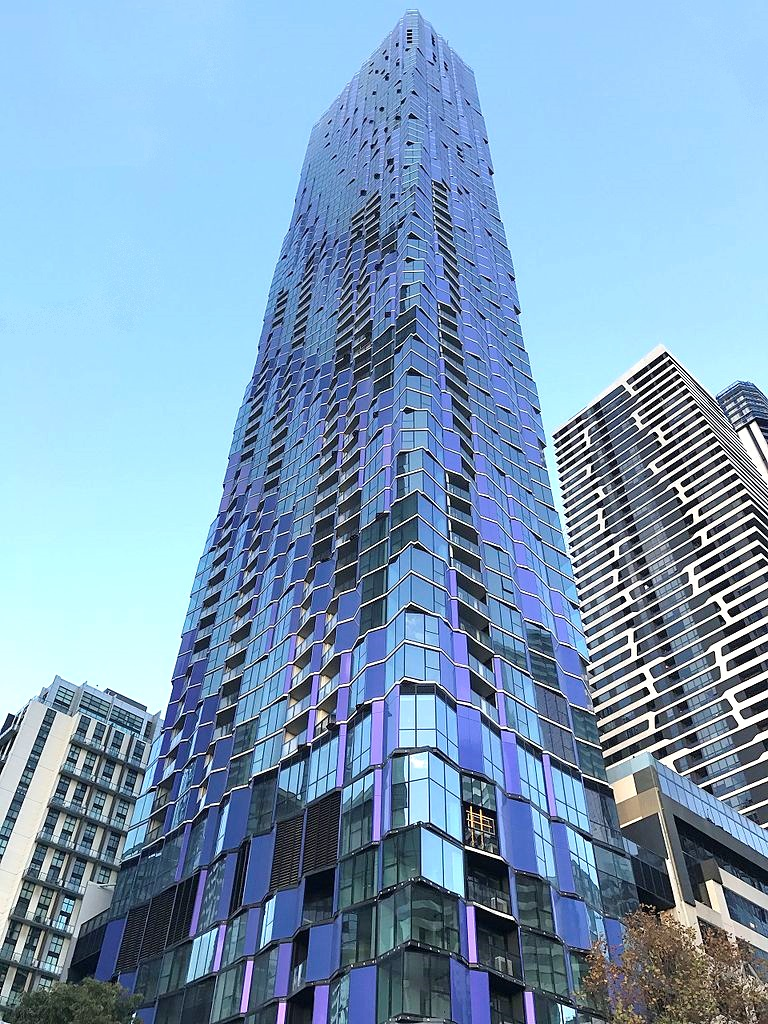
- Light House in May 2017
- Alternative names: Lighthouse

General information
- Status: Completed
- Location: 450 Elizabeth Street, Melbourne, Australia
- Groundbreaking: 2015
- Completed: 2017

Height
- Roof: 218 m (715 ft)

Technical details
- Floor count: 69

Design and construction
- Architect: Elenberg Fraser
- Developer: Hengyi Australia
- Structural engineer: Winward Structures

Other information
- Number of rooms: 607

Website
- http://www.lighthousemelbourne.com.au/

Light House Melbourne (also simply referred to as Lighthouse) is a residential skyscraper in Melbourne, Australia. Located on 450 (Note: Also cited as 420) Elizabeth Street, Melbourne, the project was designed by Elenberg Fraser and developed by Hengyi Australia. The skyscraper rises to a height of 218 metres (715 feet) and comprises 69 levels and 607 apartment dwellings. The ground floor is occupied by a reception and mail room, the eighth floor is occupied by a gym, swimming-pool, and sauna, and the remaining floors are residential. Upon its completion in 2017, it became one of the tallest residential buildings in Melbourne.

== Construction ==
Proposed in 2012, the skyscraper received planning approval by then-Planning Minister Matthew Guy later that year; and in 2014, Guy approved an amendment to the plans which would see extra height and floors added to the development. Construction on the project commenced in May 2015, before topping-out in February 2017. The project was completed later in 2017.

== See also ==
- List of tallest buildings in Australia
