= 380 Melbourne =

Residential and hotel skyscraper in Melbourne, Victoria

Coordinates: 37°48′44.6148″S 144°57′40.1436″E

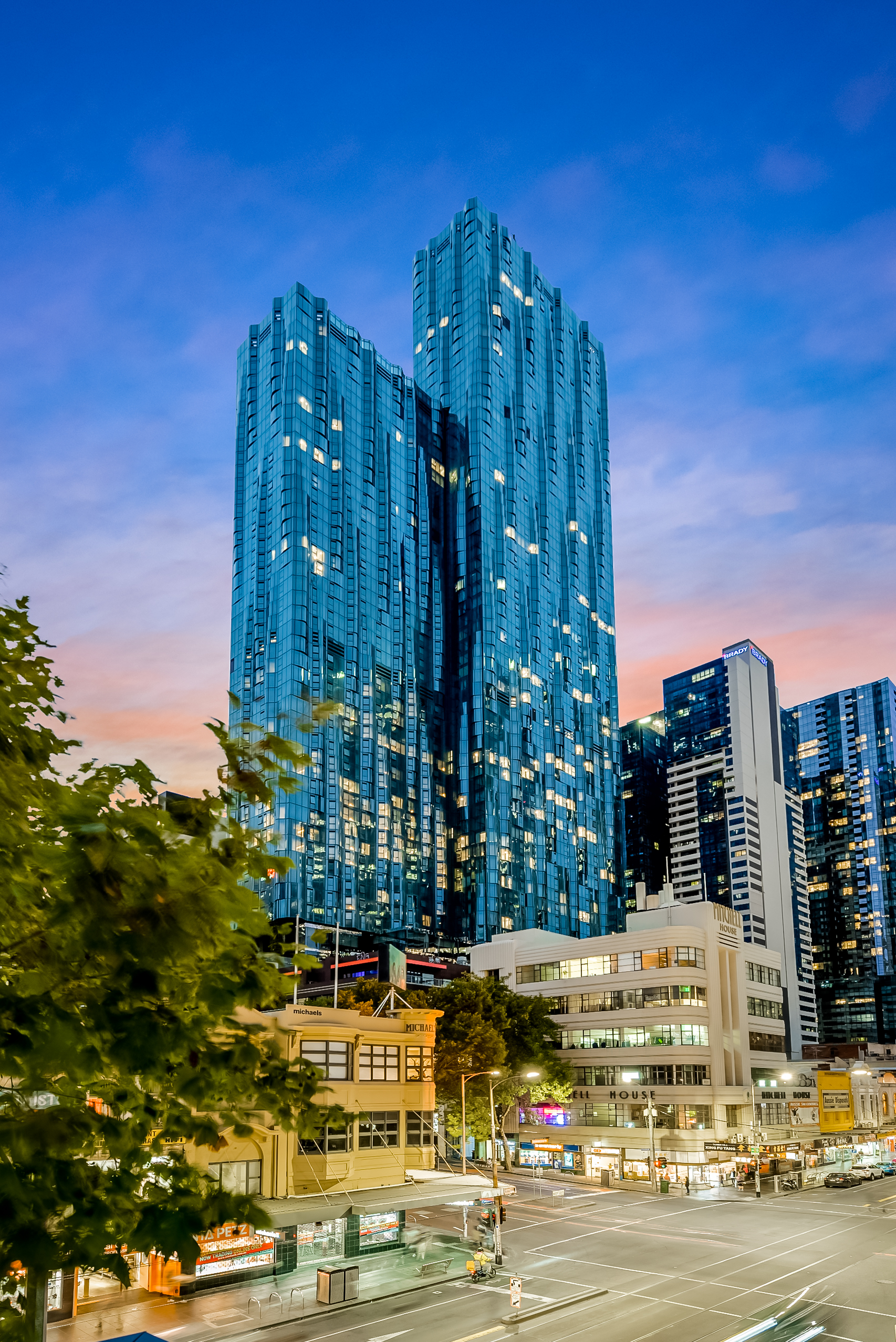
- The landmark dual towers of 380 Melbourne in the heart of the CBD

General information
- Status: Completed
- Location: 380 Lonsdale Street; 371 Little Lonsdale Street; 28 Timothy Lane, Melbourne, Australia
- Completed: 2021
- Cost: ~AUD$240.5 million

Height
- Roof: 217.5 m (714 ft)

Technical details
- Floor count: 67
- Floor area: 109,448 m^{2} (1,178,090 sq ft)

Design and construction
- Architect: Elenberg Fraser
- Developer: Brady Property Group
- Quantity surveyor: WT Partnership

Other information
- Number of rooms: 728 (residential); 312 (hotel)

380 Melbourne (also known as 380 Lonsdale Street) is a residential and hotel skyscraper in Melbourne, Victoria, Australia.

Designed by Elenberg Fraser and developed by Brady Group, the project includes 728 residential apartments as well as 312 hotel rooms within a 67-level skyscraper, and reaches a height of 217.5 metres (714 feet).

The Lonsdale Street development was first proposed in 2013, initially as a 47-storey tower; however, plans were later re–submitted and hence the project was redesigned. 380 Lonsdale Street received planning approval by the Minister for Planning Richard Wynne in March, 2015. The project had an estimated worth of AUD$240.5 million, and construction commenced in March 2018 and had an expected completion date set in 2020. The project was completed in 2021.

In 2018, IHG signed a deal with the Brady Group to have a voco-branded hotel open in the building.
