= Premier Tower =

Skyscraper in Melbourne, Australia

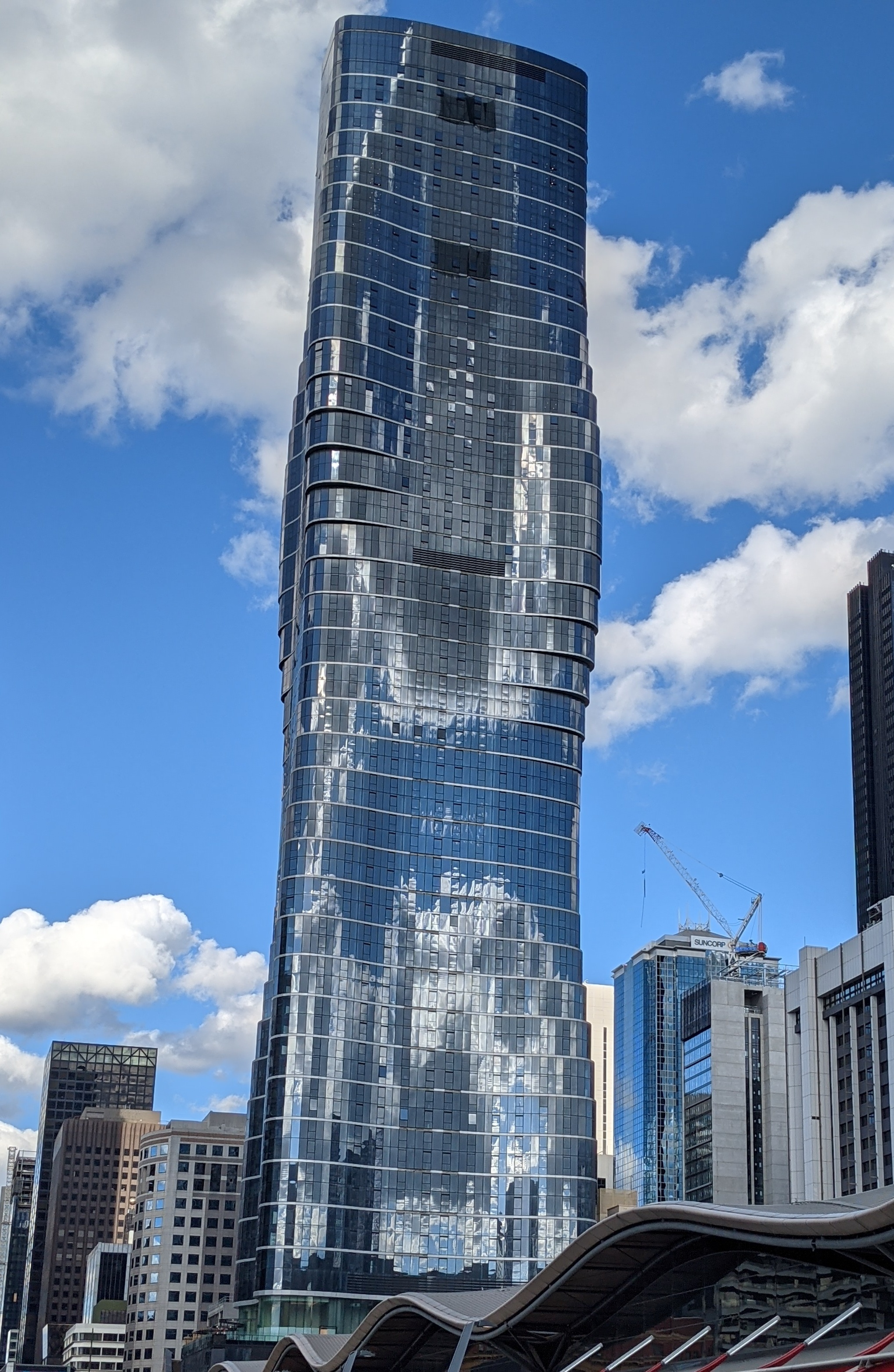
- Premier Tower in 2021

General information
- Status: Completed
- Type: Hotel and High end Residential
- Location: Residential Address: 138 Spencer Street; Hotel Address: 160 Spencer Street; Melbourne, Australia
- Coordinates: 37°49′02″S 144°57′13″E
- Groundbreaking: 2017
- Opening: June 2021
- Cost: AUD$430 million
- Owner: Fragrance Group
- Operator: PDS Group

Height
- Roof: 246 m (807 ft)

Technical details
- Floor count: Total: 78 levels; Basement: 4 Levels

Design and construction
- Architect: Elenberg Fraser
- Developer: Fragrance Group
- Main contractor: Multiplex

Other information
- Number of rooms: 795 apartments
- Number of suites: 172 Hotel keys

Premier Tower is a mixed-use skyscraper on the corner of Bourke and Spencer Streets, in Melbourne, Australia.

Designed by Elenberg Fraser, plans for a 294-metre (965 ft) tall building with 90-storeys were initially proposed in 2014; however, in order not to cast a shadow on the Yarra River to the south, both the height and the number of levels of the project were reduced in later plans, which were submitted to the Department of Planning.

In May 2015, Planning Minister Richard Wynne approved the development, now consisting of a 246–metre high residential and hotel skyscraper of 78 levels. According to architect Elenberg Fraser, the design of the building paid homage to Beyoncé's fabric-draped silhouette in the music video for her 2013 song "Ghost", which captured the curves of the human form. It was developed by Fragrance Group Limited at a cost of AUD$430 million.

Early construction on the project commenced in January 2017. When completed in 2021, Premier Tower became one of the tallest buildings in Melbourne.
