= No 2 Goods Shed =

Railway freight shed in Australia

Coordinates: 37°49′17″S 144°57′06″E

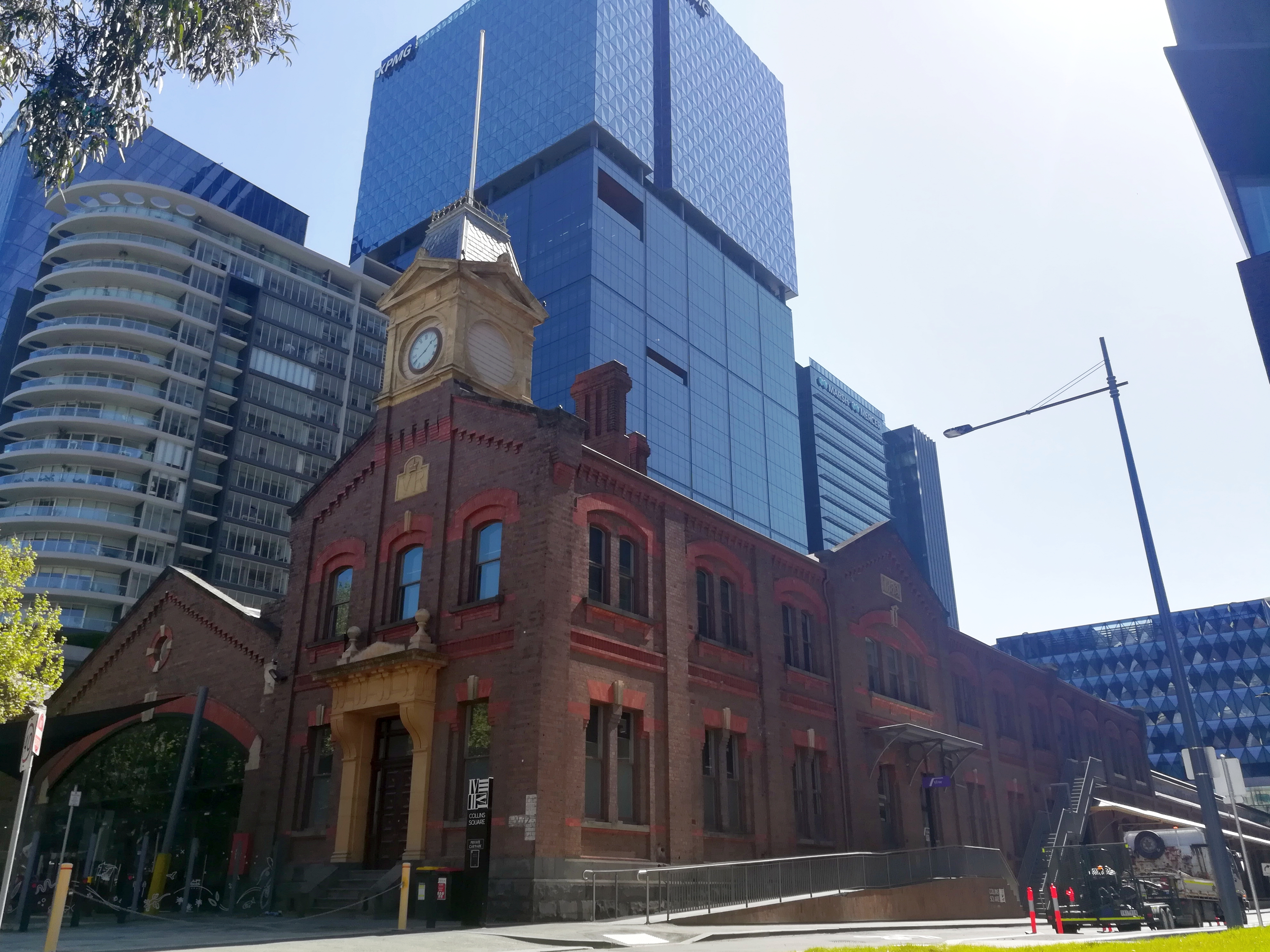
No 2 Goods Shed

No. 2 Goods Shed is a large railway freight shed in the former Spencer Street rail yards off Flinders Street Extension, Melbourne, Australia. It was constructed in 1889, originally called 'A Goods Shed', and at the time was the longest single building in Australia. Its address is at 733 Bourke Street, Docklands.

== Description ==
The polychromatic face brick structure with outside walls solid brick, bluestone sills, slate tiled gable roof, three gabled roofs with clerestories or lanterns is supported on cast iron columns at nine metre intervals with angle iron truss-framed roofs, central trusses span 15 metres side spans 9 metres. Terracotta lumber is used in the upper floor for fire prevention. Twenty six arched doors are on the east side and twenty eight on the west side with loading platforms for horse-drawn vehicles on the outside, and rail platforms to three tracks internally. the building has an overall length of 370m.

The two-storey office block at south-east corner has a central tower with stucco decoration to the main door surround and the VR insignia with a crown above the east facade and a pediment with the construction date '1889'. The clock face was not in original contract but was installed latter as at Ballarat.

== History ==
The No 2 Goods Shed was built in 1889–90 to replace previous timber and corrugated iron structures which had proved inadequate for the increased freight experienced in Melbourne during the boom years of the 1880s. The contract was awarded to builders A.P. Tozer and Company on 19 August 1889 for £72,943 17s 5 1/2d. The office section was extended to the north in 1907. No 2 Goods Shed was one of several construction projects at the time, which reflected the expansion of the Victorian Railways system. The Railways Headquarters Building in Spencer Street was constructed between 1888 and 1893, while the Flinders Street Viaduct, Flinders Street Extension and the retaining wall just south of the goods yards were also constructed around this time.

== Redevelopment ==
As part of the redevelopment of Melbourne Docklands, the shed was cut in half with the construction of the Collins Street extension. The northern part of the shed was redeveloped by Equiset Grollo Group, with the construction of a tall black glass 'Lantern' building and refurbishment of the interior, designed by Elenberg Fraser. The southern half (known as The Goods Shed, 707 Collins Street) was developed by the Walker Corporation, and has been restored and converted to offices for Pearson Australia, and Penguin Random House.

It is classified by the National Trust (B6435) and included on the Victorian Heritage Register (H0933).
