= Zahava Elenberg =

Australian architect

- Citizenship: Australian
- Education: Royal Melbourne Institute of Technology
- Occupation: Architect
- Known for: Elenberg Fraser (co-founder); Move-in (founder)

Zahava Elenberg is an Australian architect. She co-founded Melbourne-based architecture practice Elenberg Fraser and is the founder of turn-key accommodation fit out and interior furnishing company Move-in.

== Early years ==
Elenberg is the daughter of Anna Schwartz and artist Joel Elenberg. She is the step daughter of publisher and developer Morry Schwartz. Elenberg attended Preshil, The Margaret Lyttle Memorial School and has been a director of the Preshil School Council and the Preshil School Foundation.

She completed a bachelor of architecture at RMIT University and graduated in 1998 with first class honours.

As a child, Elenberg was photographed by Melbourne artist Bill Henson and spoke out in support of the artistic value of his work when it was seized by NSW police after a complaint by a child protection campaigner.

== Career ==
In 1998, Elenberg co-founded Elenberg Fraser Architecture with Callum Fraser, and has risen to prominence in the Australian design scene. Now with offices in Australia and South-East Asia, Elenberg Fraser is one of Australia's leading practices with a focus on multi-residential and interior design.

In 2002, Elenberg established Move-in, a niche business specialising in design-led turn-key furniture solutions and high volume fit-outs for student accommodation, investment, hotel and serviced apartment sectors, and has delivered projects throughout Australia, Asia and the Middle East.

In 2017, Elenberg joined the board of MIFF, the Melbourne International Film Festival, with special responsibilities in finance, creative development and strategy, philanthropy and industry programs.

== Honors ==
In 2003, Elenberg was awarded the Telstra Young Business Woman of the Year and in 2005 was named the Ernst & Young Southern Region Young Entrepreneur of the Year.

Elenberg has been an active contributor within the design community and has participated in many panel discussions and conversations around entrepreneurship and design. Following her Telstra award, Elenberg gave the keynote address to 35,000 students, staff and guests at the RMIT University graduation ceremony at Telstra Dome.
