= Victoria One =

Residential skyscraper in Melbourne, Victoria

- Victoria One in September 2023

General information
- Status: Completed
- Location: 452 Elizabeth Street, Melbourne, Victoria (Australia)
- Coordinates: 37.807866°S 144.960627°E
- Groundbreaking: 2014
- Estimated completion: 2018
- Cost: AUD$350 million

Height
- Roof: 246.8 m (810 ft)

Technical details
- Floor count: 76
- Floor area: 54,000 m^{2} (580,000 sq ft)

Design and construction
- Architect: Elenberg Fraser
- Developer: Golden Age Development Group

Victoria One is a residential skyscraper in Melbourne, Victoria, Australia.

Designed by Elenberg Fraser, the building was first proposed in 2013 and approved by then-Planning Minister Matthew Guy in June 2014. The development reaches 246.8 metres in height. As of 2024, it is the second tallest residential building in the Melbourne CBD core, and the tenth-tallest building in Melbourne overall. The building includes 644 residential apartments spanning across 76 levels.

Construction on the $350 million project commenced in November 2014 and it was completed in mid–2018.
