= Elenberg Fraser =

Elenberg Fraser is an Australian architecture firm, based in Melbourne, Brisbane and the Gold Coast. It was established in 1998 by Zahava Elenberg and Callum Fraser, both RMIT University graduates. Notable projects include the interior design of restaurants such as Vue de Monde (2005) and Gingerboy (2006) and apartment buildings such as Liberty Tower (2002), Watergate Place (2005), A'Beckett Tower (2010), Eq. Tower (2017), Light House Melbourne (2017), Aurora Melbourne Central (2019), Swanston Central (2019) and Premier Tower (2021), all in Melbourne. Their design for the alpine hotels Huski (2005) and St Falls (2009) both at Falls Creek, Victoria, received awards for their highly sculptural qualities. In 2009 Elenberg Fraser also completed the adaptive reuse of No 2 Goods Shed in Docklands, a heritage-listed building transformed into office and hospitality space.

== Selected projects ==
=== Completed ===
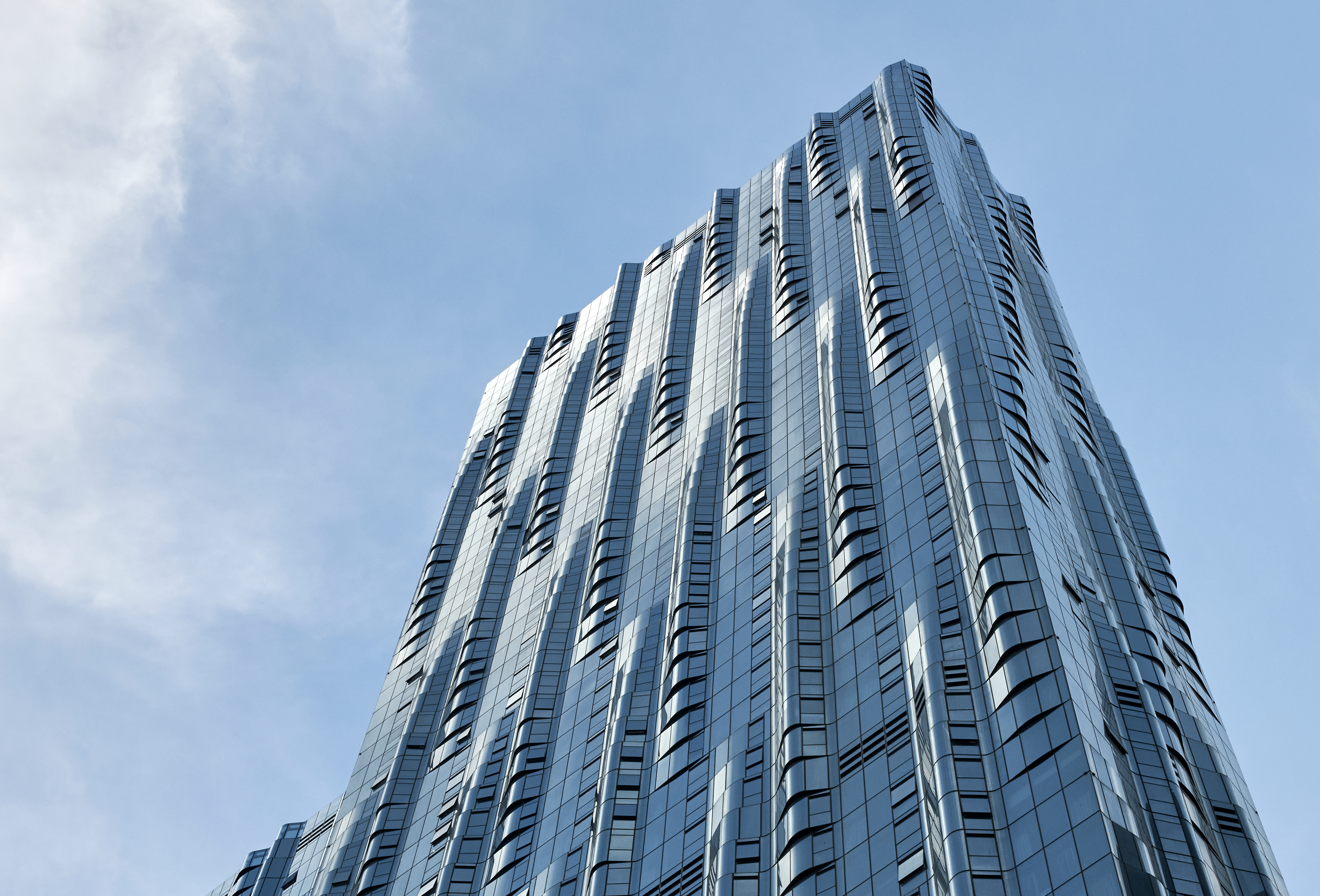
380 Lonsdale

- 2002 Liberty Tower, Melbourne
- 2005 Vue de Monde, Melbourne
- 2005 Watergate Place, Docklands, Melbourne
- 2005 Huski Hotel, Falls Creek
- 2009 St Falls ski lodge, Falls Creek
- 2009 No 2 Goods Shed, Docklands, Melbourne
- 2010 A'Beckett Tower, Melbourne
- 2013 Luna apartments, St Kilda
- 2015 Abode apartments, Russell St, Melbourne
- 2016 FV Apartments (3 towers), Fortitude Valley, Brisbane
- 2016 M Docklands, La Trobe Street, Docklands
- 2017 Eq. Tower, A'Beckett Street, Melbourne
- 2017 Light House Melbourne, Elizabeth Street, Melbourne
- 2018 Victoria One, Elizabeth Street, Melbourne
- 2020 Aurora Melbourne Central, La Trobe Street, Melbourne
- 2020 Realm Adelaide, Austin Street, Adelaide
- 2021 380 Lonsdale Street, Melbourne
- 2021 Premier Tower, Spencer St, Melbourne

=== Gallery ===
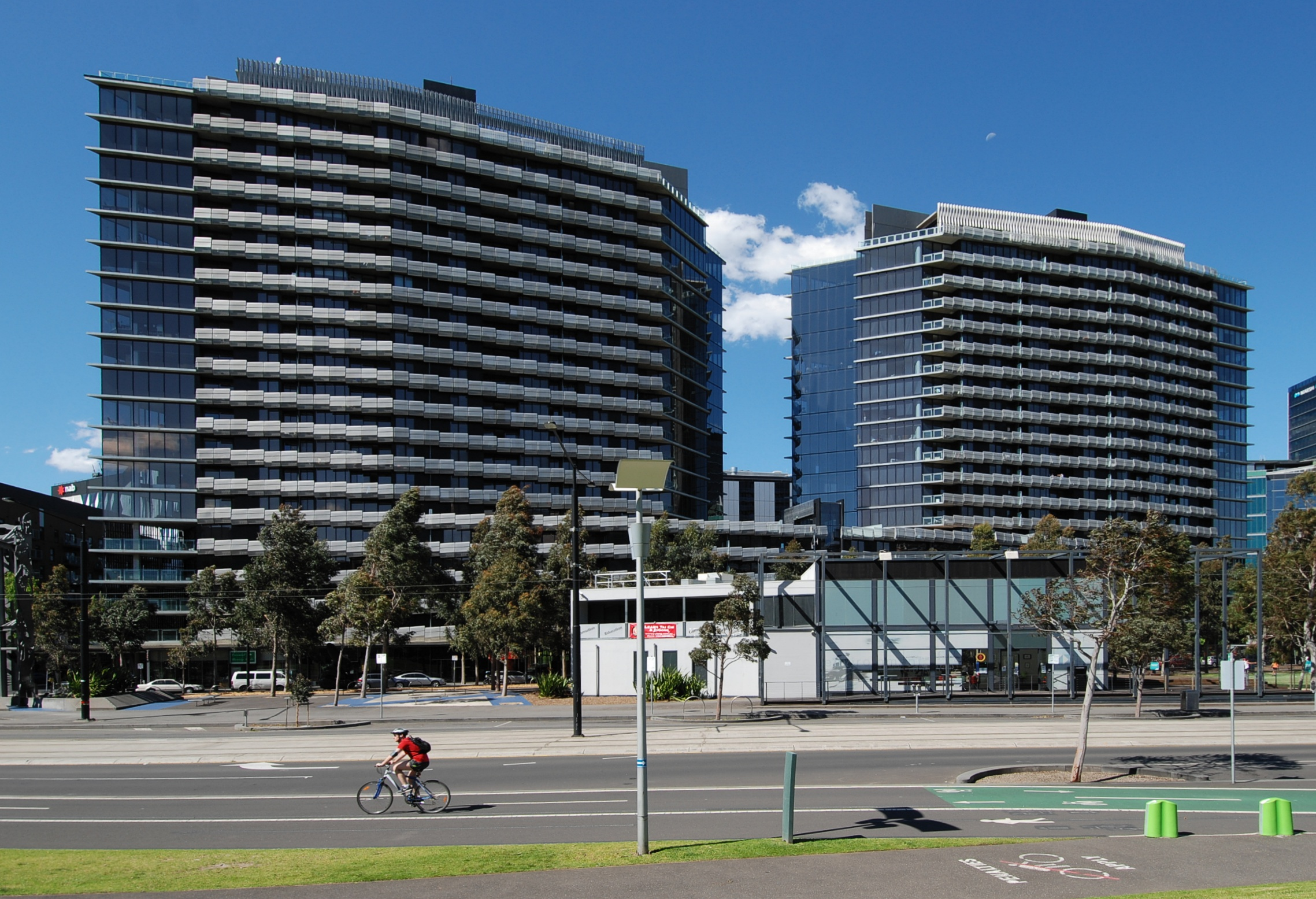
Watergate Place, Docklands, Melbourne (2005)

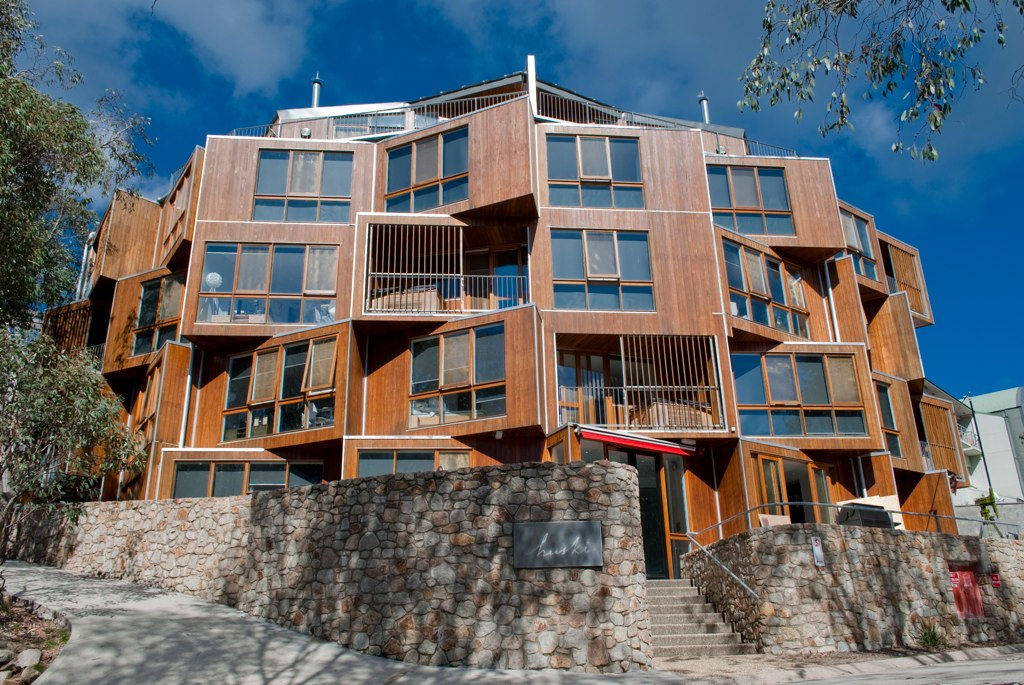
Huski Hotel, Falls Creek (2005)

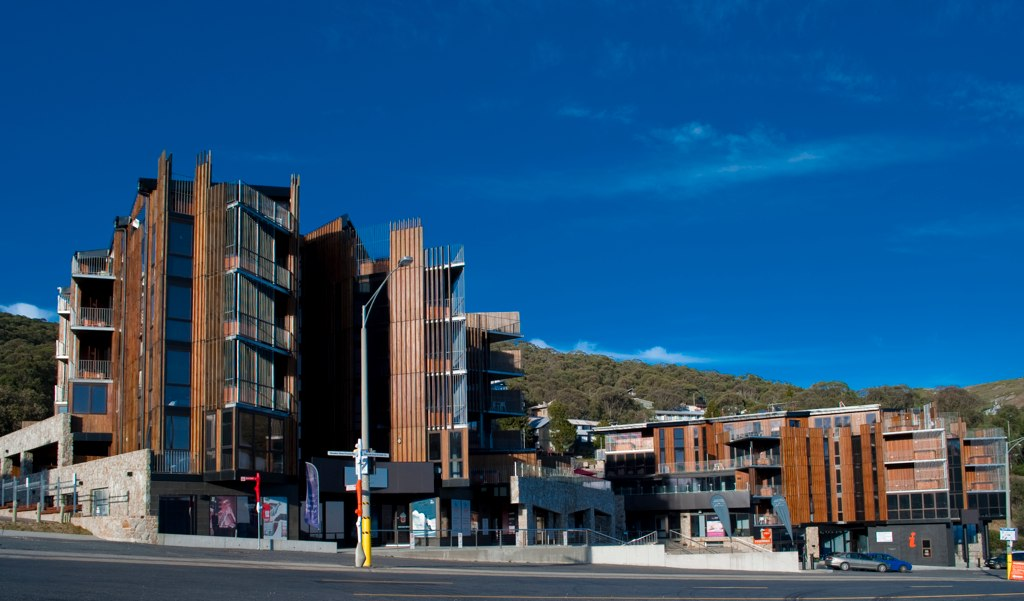
St Falls ski lodge, Falls Creek (2009)

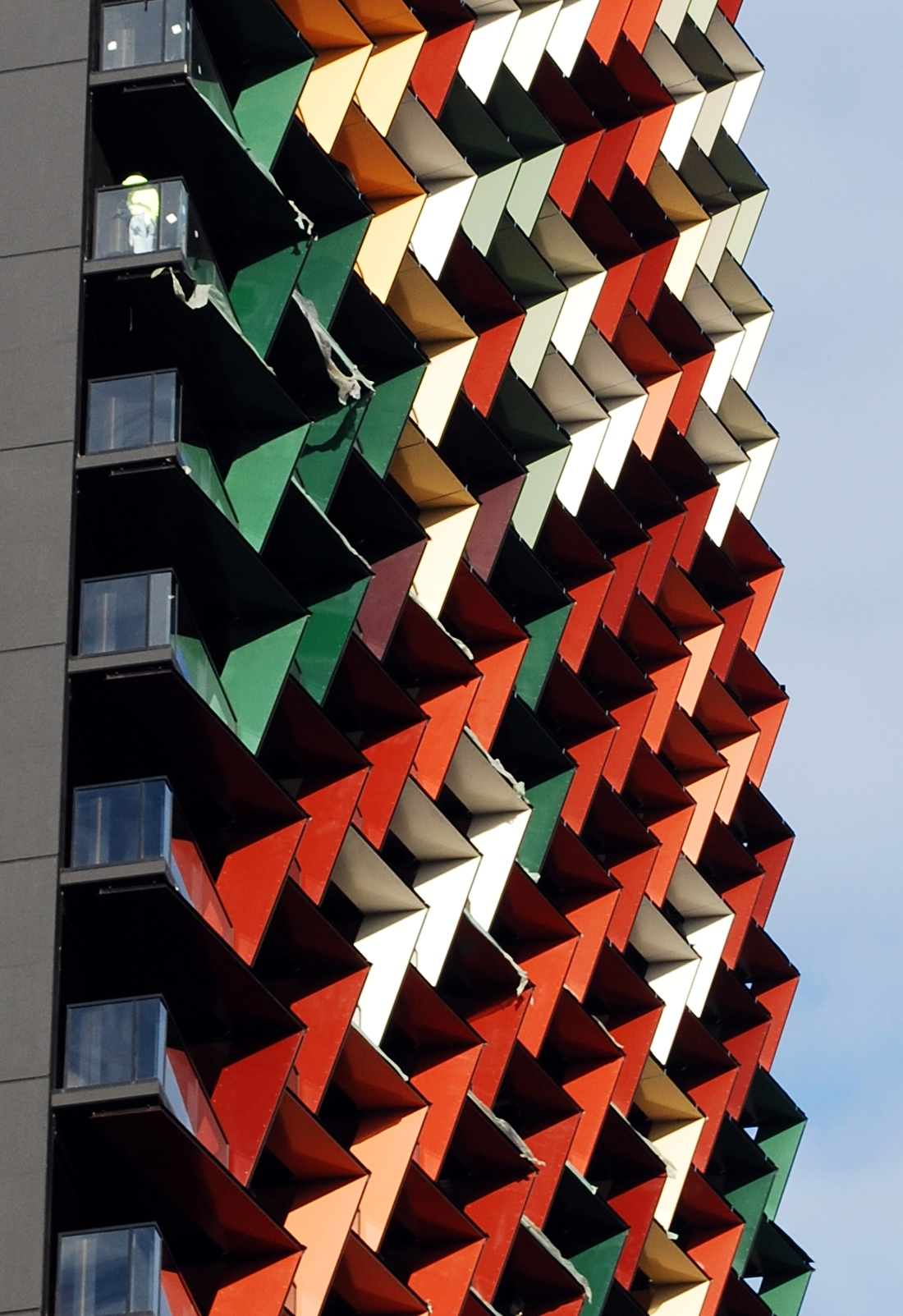
A'Beckett Tower (2010)

== Awards ==
- 2011 Asia Pacific Property Awards: Five Star Award High-Rise Architecture: A’Beckett Tower
- 2011 Dulux Colour Awards: Winner Grand Prix: Winner Residential Exterior, A’Beckett Tower
- 2011 Australian Property Council Innovation & Excellence Awards Best Sustainable Development: Good Shed North
- 2011 Australian Interior Design Awards Hospitality: Cafe Vue @ Melbourne International Airport (shortlisted)
- 2020 Dulux Colour Awards: Commercial and Multi Residential Exterior (shortlisted), Gem Waterline Place
- 2020 Australian Interior Design Awards: Residential Design, Gem Waterline Place
