= Aurora Melbourne Central =

Residential skyscraper in Melbourne, Australia

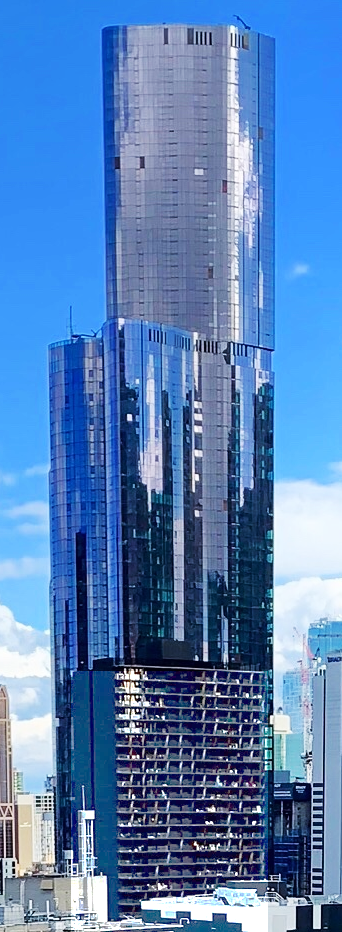
- Aurora Melbourne Central topped-out, in 2019
- Interactive map of the Aurora Melbourne Central area

General information
- Status: Completed
- Location: 224–252 La Trobe Street, Melbourne, Victoria, Australia
- Coordinates: 37.809656°S 144.962441°E
- Groundbreaking: 2015
- Completed: 2019
- Cost: AUD$730 million

Height
- Roof: 270.5 m (887 ft)

Technical details
- Floor count: 84

Design and construction
- Architect: Elenberg Fraser
- Developer: UEM Sunrise
- Main contractor: Probuild

Website
- www.aurora-oc.com

Aurora Melbourne Central is a 270.5-metre (887 ft) high residential skyscraper in Melbourne, Australia. It is Melbourne's third-tallest building and the fifth tallest building in Australia.

Developed by Malaysian–based UEM Sunrise and designed by Elenberg Fraser, the project was first proposed in 2014, and received approval by then-Planning Minister Matthew Guy in October 2014. Previously named 224-252 La Trobe Street, after the address of the 3,197 m^{2} (34,410 sq ft) site, the project was later renamed to Aurora Melbourne Central after the natural light display aurora australis, and the shopping centre of the same name.

In 2019, when the tower was completed, it was the second-tallest building in Melbourne, at the time behind the Eureka Tower. Aurora comprises 959 residential apartments and 252 serviced apartments across 86 storeys; as such, it is also one of the largest residential buildings in Australia.

Construction on the $730 million project commenced in October 2015 by Probuild, and the skyscraper topped-out in late 2018. Construction finished in 2019.

In 2020 residents in the higher levels of the building recorded snow flurries, an unusual phenomenon for Melbourne.

In 2021 residents of the building reported being disturbed by creaking noises in strong winds. Audio recordings placed the noise arising from the building swaying at 60 decibels.
