= Eq. Tower =

Residential building in Melbourne, Victoria, Australia

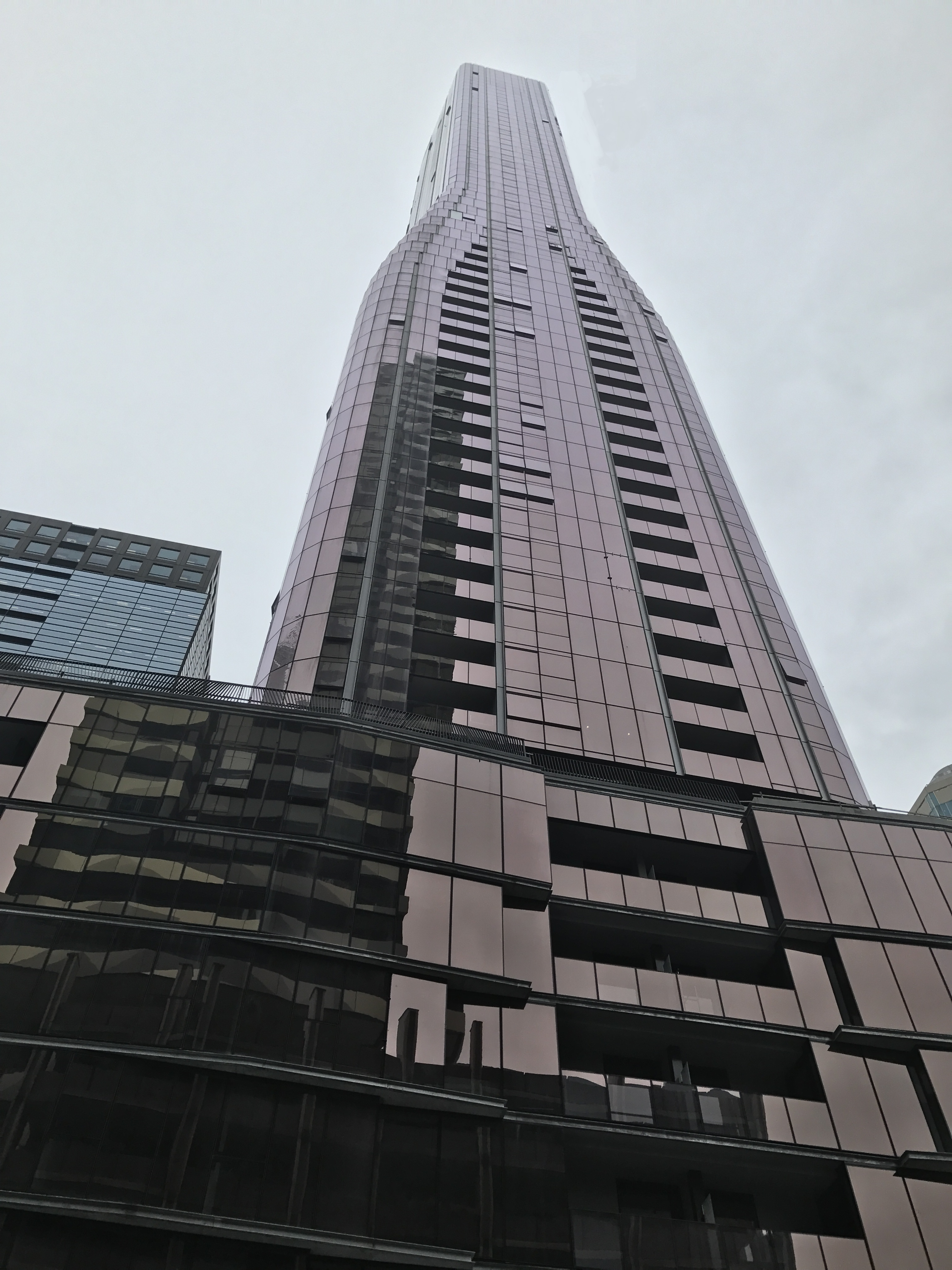
- Eq. Tower in 2017
- Interactive map of the Eq. Tower area
- Alternative names: EQ Tower

General information
- Status: Completed
- Type: Residential
- Location: Melbourne, Australia, 127–141 A Beckett Street
- Coordinates: 37.8098°S 144.9597°E
- Construction started: February 2015
- Topped-out: October 2016
- Completed: May 2017

Height
- Roof: 202.7 m (665 ft)

Technical details
- Floor count: 63

Design and construction
- Architect: Elenberg Fraser
- Developer: CD Property; Sino-Ocean Land
- Main contractor: Brookfield Multiplex

Other information
- Number of rooms: 633
- Parking: 212

Website
- www.eqtower.com

Eq. Tower is a residential building in Melbourne, Victoria, Australia.

The skyscraper is developed by ICD Property group in conjunction with Sino-Ocean Land and designed by architect Elenberg Fraser. Launched in 2013, the project received approval by the then-Planning Minister Matthew Guy in February 2014. Designed to accommodate 633 apartment dwellings, the residential skyscraper reaches a height of 202.7 metres (665 feet) and comprises 63 floors.

Construction on Eq. commenced in February 2015, before topping-out in October 2016. The project, scheduled to be completed by June 2017, was completed a month early in May. It is the 30th-tallest building in Melbourne as of 2026.
