= The Realm, Adelaide =

The Realm
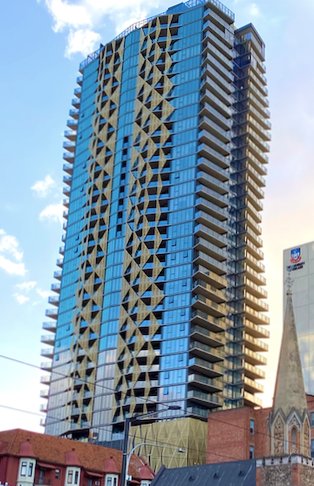
- The Realm in 2021
- Interactive map of the The Realm area
- Alternative names: Realm Adelaide

General information
- Status: Completed
- Type: Residential
- Location: Adelaide, Australia, 9-19 Austin Street
- Coordinates: 34.922°S 138.6049°E
- Construction started: 2017; 9 years ago
- Completed: 2020; 6 years ago
- Opening: 2020; 6 years ago

Height
- Height: 132 m (433 ft)

Technical details
- Floor count: 40

Design and construction
- Architecture firm: Elenberg Fraser
- Developer: Parallel Property

The Realm is a residential skyscraper in Adelaide, Australia. Designed by Elenberg Fraser, the tower stands at a height of 132 metres.

== History ==
The construction of the tower, developed by Parallel Property, began in 2017 and was completed in 2020. Ninety-five percent of the building was sold prior to the completion of construction in 2020. The tower's northern penthouse, sold for A$ 5.2 million, also set a record as the most expensive apartment ever sold off-plan in Adelaide.

== Description ==
Located in Adelaide's CBD, the building stands 132 meters tall across 40 floors, which makes it the third tallest in the city after Frome Central Tower One and Market Square Tower. The façade of the tower, which comprises approximately 310 apartments of various sizes as well as eight levels of parking, is distinguished by geometric gold-coloured screens that filter sunlight.

== See also ==
- List of tallest buildings in Adelaide
