= List of tallest buildings in Adelaide =

Skyline of Adelaide
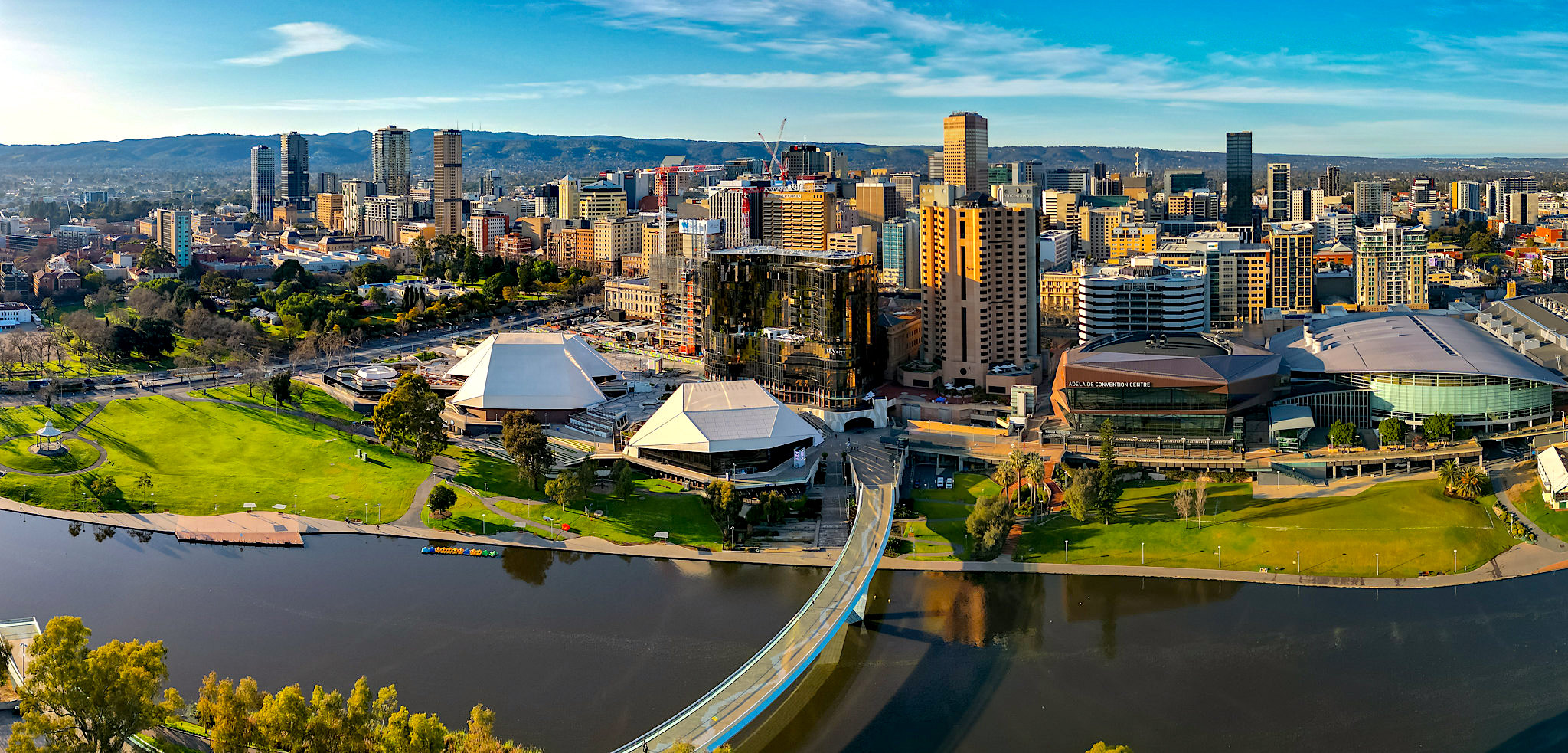
- Adelaide CBD in 2022
- Tallest building: Frome Central Tower One (2019)
- Tallest building height: 138 m (453 ft)

Number of tall buildings (2026)
- Taller than 75 m (246 ft): 30 + 1 T/O
- Taller than 100 m (328 ft): 12

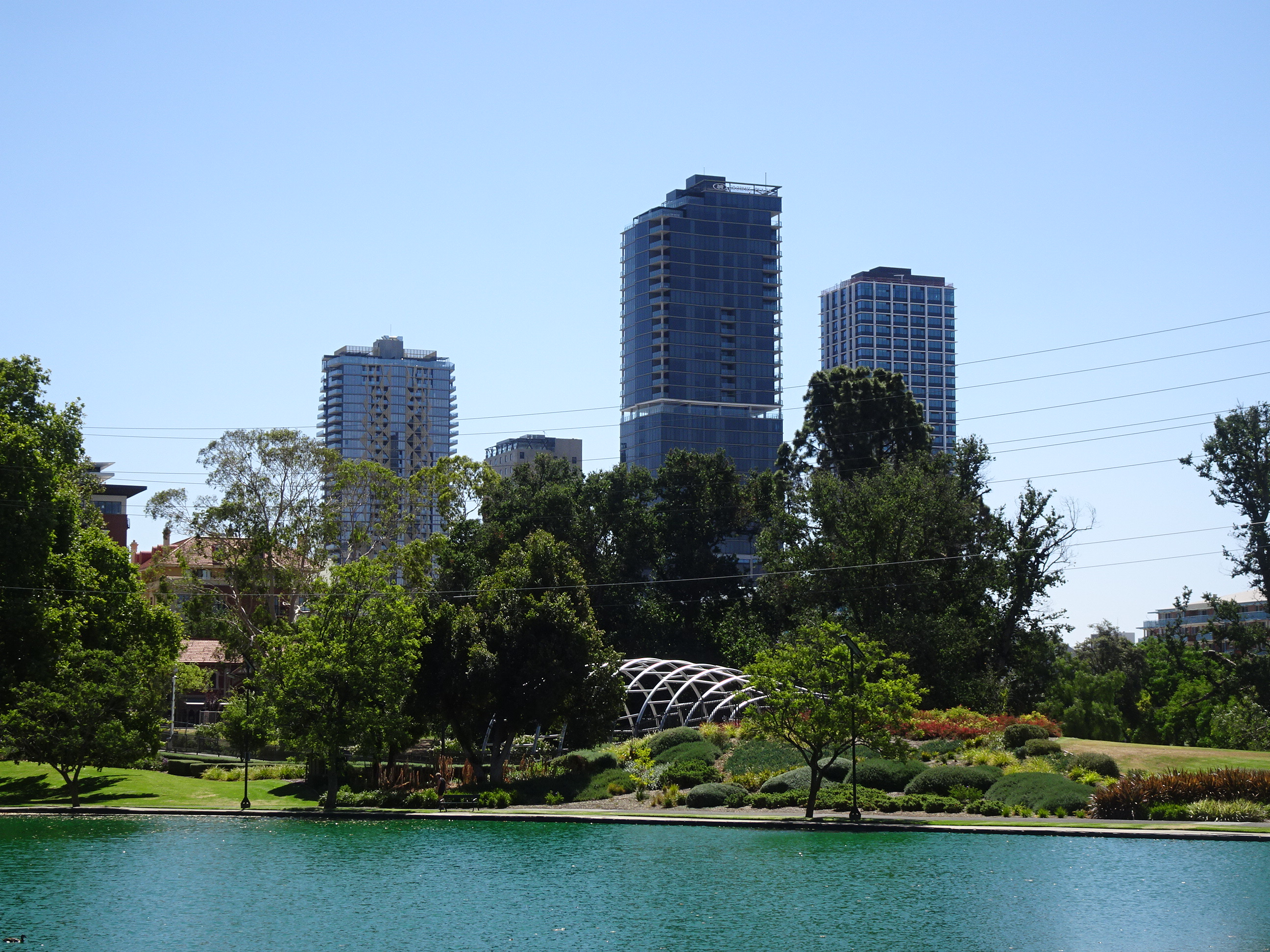
Recent high rises from Rymill Park. From left to right: The Realm, Frome Central Tower One, and Yugo Adelaide City.

Adelaide contains the vast majority, if not all, the high-rise buildings in the Australian state of South Australia. The city is home to 30 buildings with a height of 75 meters (246 ft) or greater as of 2026, 12 of which are taller than 100 m (328 ft). While it is the largest skyline in South Australia, Adelaide is the most populous city in Australia to not have a single building taller than 150 m (492 ft), the height often used as the definition of a skyscraper.

The tallest building in Adelaide is the 37-storey, 138 m (453 ft) Frome Central Tower One, also called the Adelaidean, a mixed-use residential and hotel building constructed in 2019. Upon completion, it overtook RAA Place, an office high-rise which had been the tallest building in Adelaide since 1988. Adelaide's skyline grew steadily from the 1960s to the early 1990s, which saw the completion of other notable towers commercial such as 30 Pirie Street and the Grenfell Centre. Following a pause in high-rise construction in the 1990s and early 2000s, development resumed in the mid-2000s.

Since the mid-2010s, Adelaide has been undergoing an unprecedented high-rise boom, spurred by steady population growth, that has transformed the appearance of its skyline. Eight of Adelaide's ten current tallest buildings were built after 2018, including Frome Central Tower One and the city's second tallest building, The Realm. Adelaide's skyline is set to grow further with the approval of the 160 m (525 ft), 38-storey Festival Tower 2, an office skyscraper with a floor space of around 50,000 square metres (538,000 sq ft). It is expected to be completed no earlier than 2027, and become Adelaide's first skyscraper taller than 150 m (492 ft) if built.

The vast majority of the city's high-rise buildings are located in the central business district, a 4.33 square kilometre (1.67 sq mi) built-up area that is encompassed by the Adelaide Park Lands, separating the skyline from the rest of the city. There are also multiple short residential high-rises in the western sea-side suburb of Glenelg, along the coast of Gulf St Vincent. Height restrictions, which have been enforced since the 1990s, have limited the number of high-rise buildings constructed in the city, although they have been eased in recent times.

== History ==
Number of buildings by height in Adelaide by the end of each year. Click on the legend to toggle a specific height on or off. View chart definition.

=== Early history–1960s ===
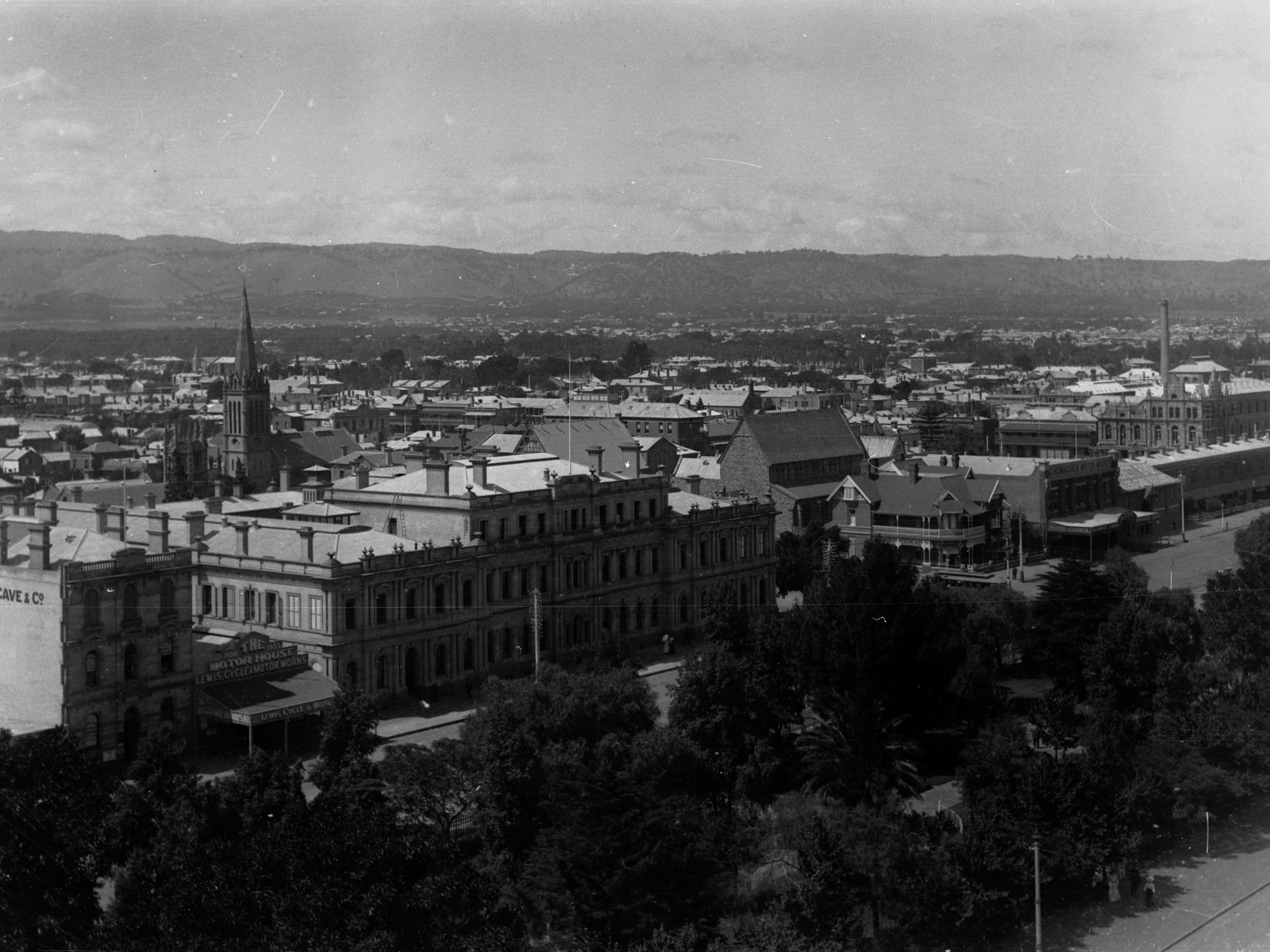
Adelaide pictured from the General Post Office in 1935, St. Andrew's Presbyterian Church visible on the left.

Adelaide was Australia's third-largest city until the postwar era, having been overtaken by Brisbane and Perth in later years. The first "skyscraper" or "high-rise" in the city is considered by some to be the classically inspired, six-storey Verco building, which opened on North Terrace in 1912. William Alfred Verco, the building's developer, was also a physician, one of the first graduates of the University of Adelaide's new medical school in 1890. Wanting to pioneer large building construction in Adelaide, Verco adopted reinforced concrete building by liaising with concrete specialists in Adelaide and in Melbourne.

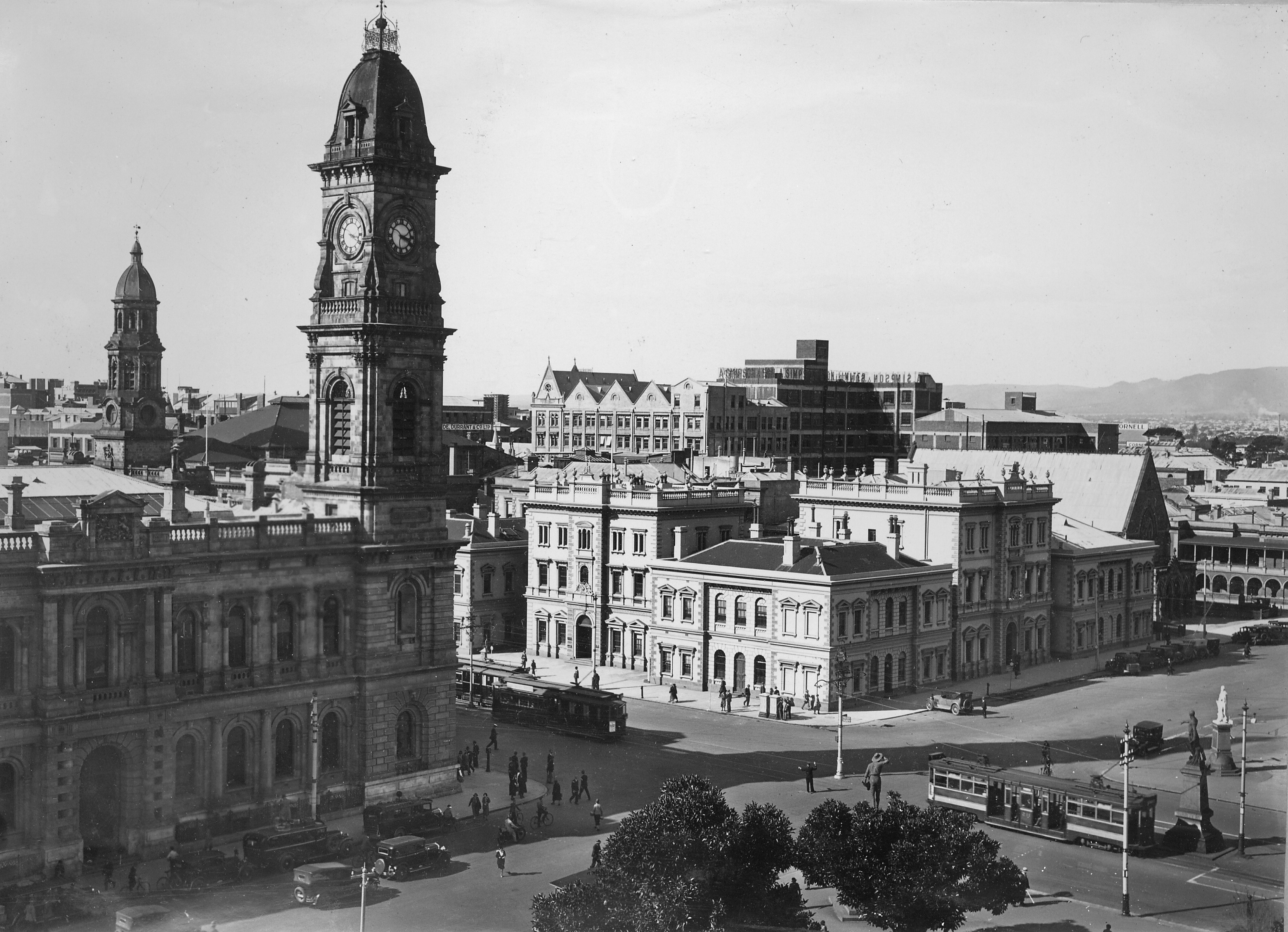
Adelaide CBD in 1950, Adelaide Town Hall visible on far left.

The CML Building took the title of the tallest structure in the city from St Peter's Cathedral when it was completed in 1934, during the Great Depression. At 11 storeys, it was the highest legally permissible size at that time. The Romanesque-style building is most remarkable for the material of its facade, known as Benedict Stone. This material was invented in the 1920s by a Queensland mine that crushed porphyry and blended it into a mix that was poured and set in moulds.

Another early high-rise was the Beaux-Arts style AMP Building, completed in 1936; it was built as the new state headquarters of the AMP (then the Australian Mutual Provident Society), replacing smaller premises built for the Society on the same site in 1880. The building is also significant for being designed by the notable local architect Louis Laybourne-Smith, considered one of the key practitioners of architecture in South Australia in the first half of the 20th century. The AMP moved to a new headquarters at 1 King William Street in 1968; this 19-storey office tower is also considered to be Adelaide's first skyscraper. Upon completion, it replaced the Reserve Bank of Australia as the tallest building in Adelaide until 1975.

=== 1970s–1990s ===
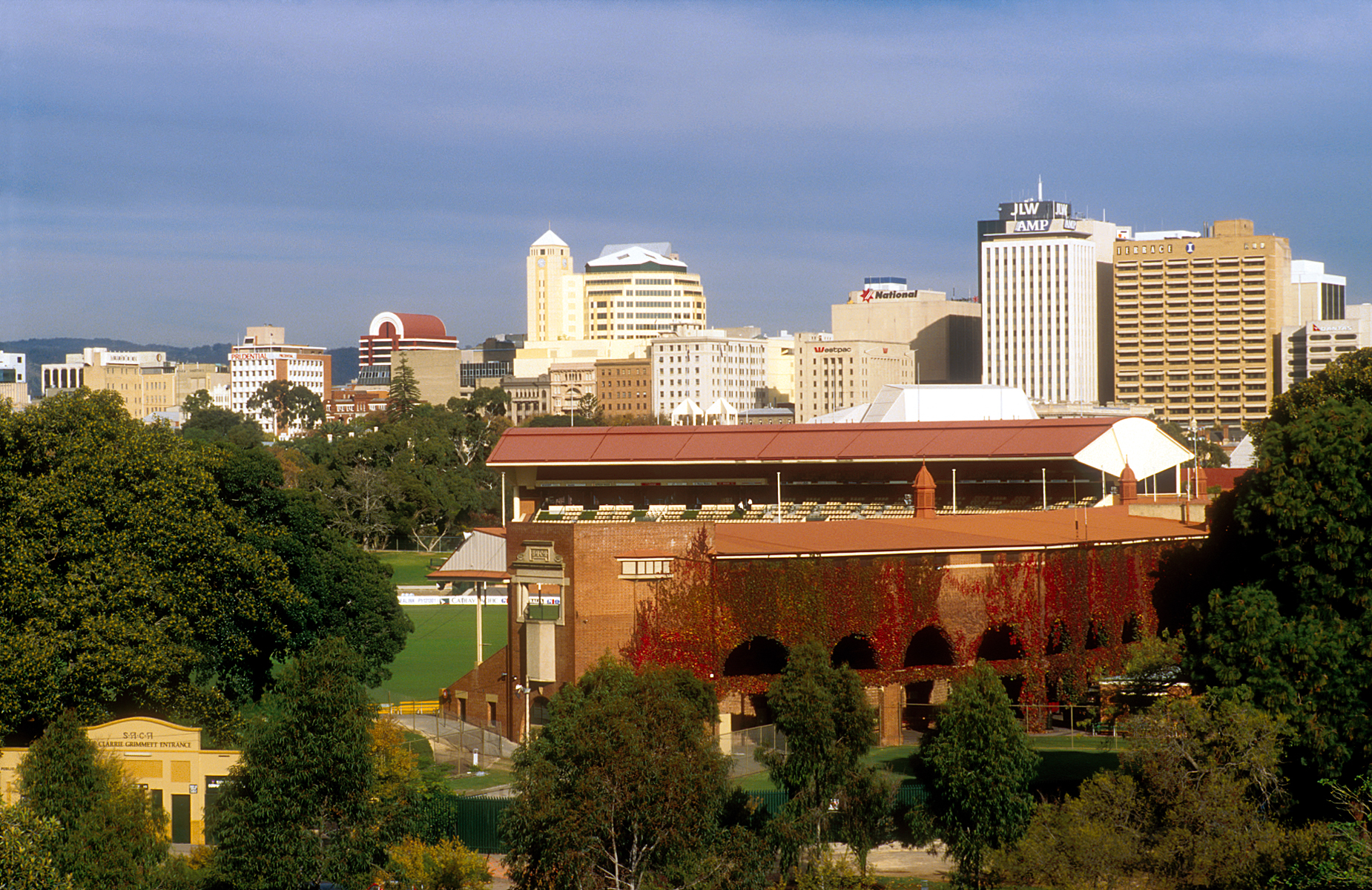
Adelaide skyline in 1995, with Myer Center in middle.

The height of the new AMP Building (now called 1KWS), was soon matched by SKM House in 1971, and hence the two shared the title of Adelaide's tallest building. They would be surpassed definitively by the Grenfell Centre in 1975, which was the first building in the city to surpass 100 m (328 ft) in height, specifically at 103 m (338 ft) tall. Due to its dark exterior and boxy shape, it has been given the nickname of "Black Stump". 13 years later, the Grenfell Centre would be overtaken by Telstra House (now known by its address, 30 Pirie Street) in 1987. Only a year later, Telstra House would itself be surpassed by State Bank Building, now RAA Place, in 1988. At a height of 132 m (432 ft), it was considerably taller than Telstra Place, and would remain as Adelaide's tallest building for over three decades until 2019. Often considered as one of the city's most iconic edifices, the building has been known under various names before its current designation of RAA Place. Built for and initially named after the State Bank of South Australia, the building was renamed only three years later to BankSA Building, after the collapse of the bank in 1991. It was then purchased by global energy company Santos Limited, and renamed Santos House in 1997. BankSA's new owners, Westpac, then acquired the building in 2007, whereupon it became known as Westpac House. Finally, in 2022, the Royal Automobile Association (RAA) purchased naming rights for the building.

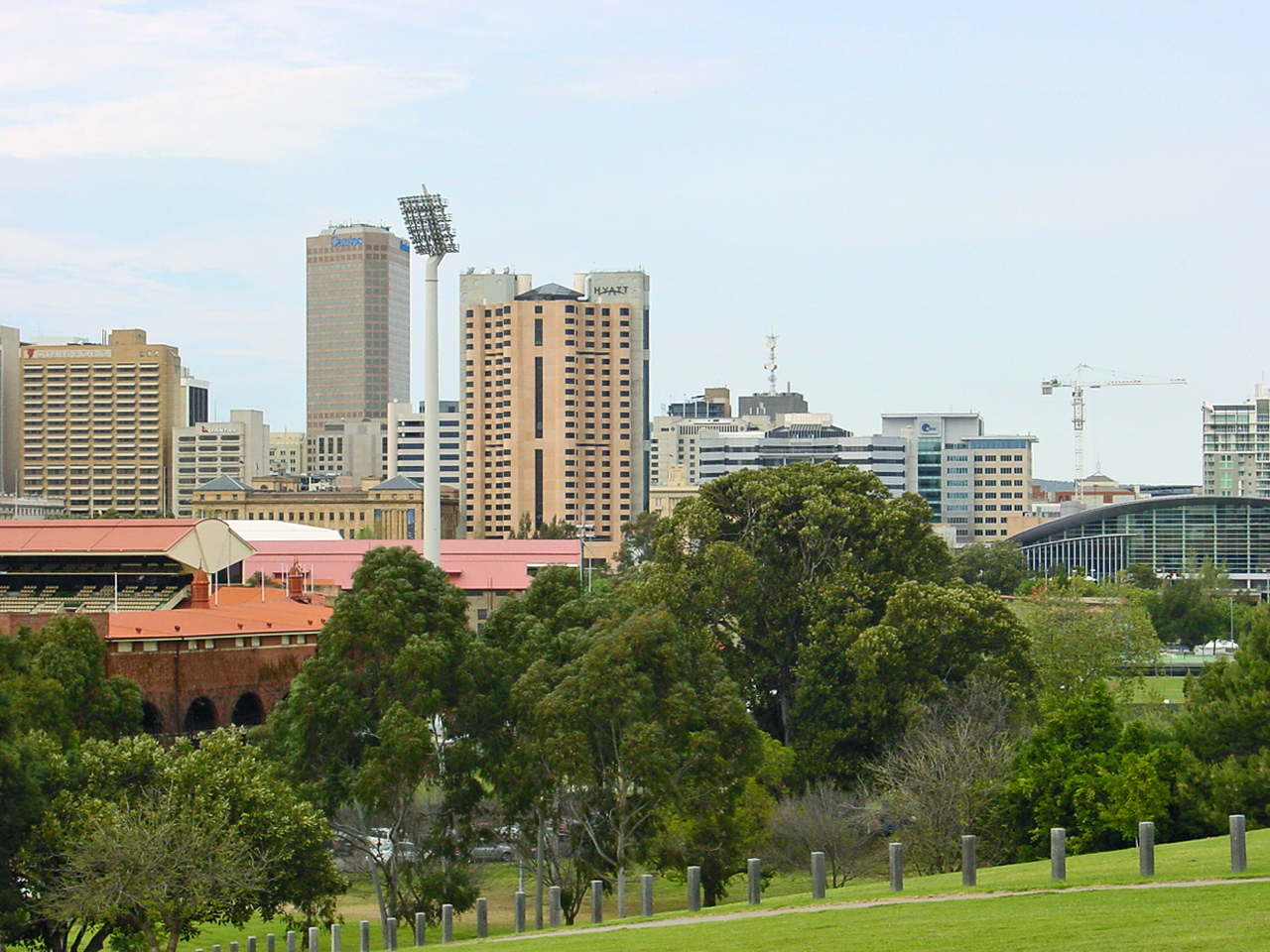
Skyline of Adelaide in 2002, InterContinental Adelaide in centre on the right of the now-RAA Place.

Adelaide's tallest hotel building at the time, the InterContinental Adelaide (then a Hyatt Regency Hotel), was built between 1988 and 1989. It was located next to, and built alongside the Adelaide Convention Centre, which opened only a year prior in 1987. The building underwent an extensive renovation in 2021.

One of Adelaide's most unique high-rises is a tower inside the Myer Centre, a shopping mall that opened in 1991. A six-storey office tower named Terrace Towers was constructed behind the two historic buildings, sitting atop the centre; in total, the high-rise amounted to 18 storeys. The tower and mall's postmodern design was inspired by Victorian architecture, and contains a clock face on the north, western and eastern sides of the tower.

=== 2000s–present ===
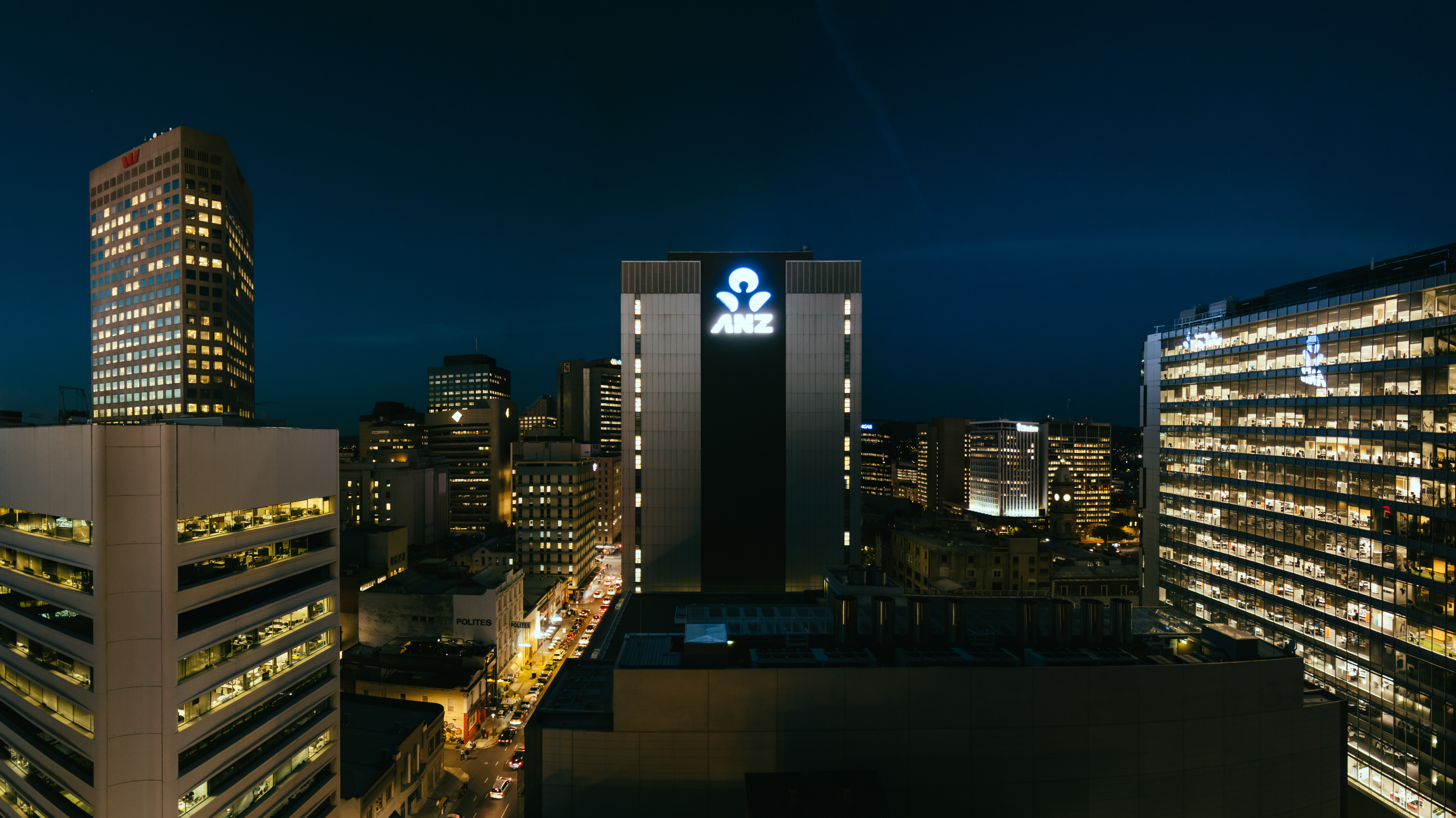
Adelaide CBD in 2013, with ANZ House in focus. The clock tower of the Town Hall, once the city's tallest structure, is visible on the right.

Following the early 1990s recession, high-rise development entered a decline that lasted over a decade. No buildings above 75 m (246 ft) were completed for sixteen years after 1991, until ANZ House was built in 2007. Developed by the Aspen Group, the building was pre-sold to the Commonwealth Office Fund (now Colonial) for the then record price of $143 million, about 18 months prior to completion. It marked a new standard for energy efficiency in the city; according to Matthew Salisbury, director of WSP Lincolne Scott, which designed the building services, the tower "was the first building [in Adelaide] to use passive chilled beams in a speculative building".

In the 2010s, high-rise development increased significantly, a trend that accelerated towards the end of the decade and continues presently into the 2020s. In 2016, Vue on King William was completed. At a height of 89 m (292 ft), it was the city's tallest residential building at the time, and was located on the southern end of the city centre. The building won the 2016 Urban Development Institute of Australia SA branch High Density Housing Award. In 2018, residents of the tower planned to take legal action, claiming that their units were uncomfortably hot. Other residential buildings such as Kodo Apartments (2019) and Penny Place (2021) have pushed the skyline southwards.

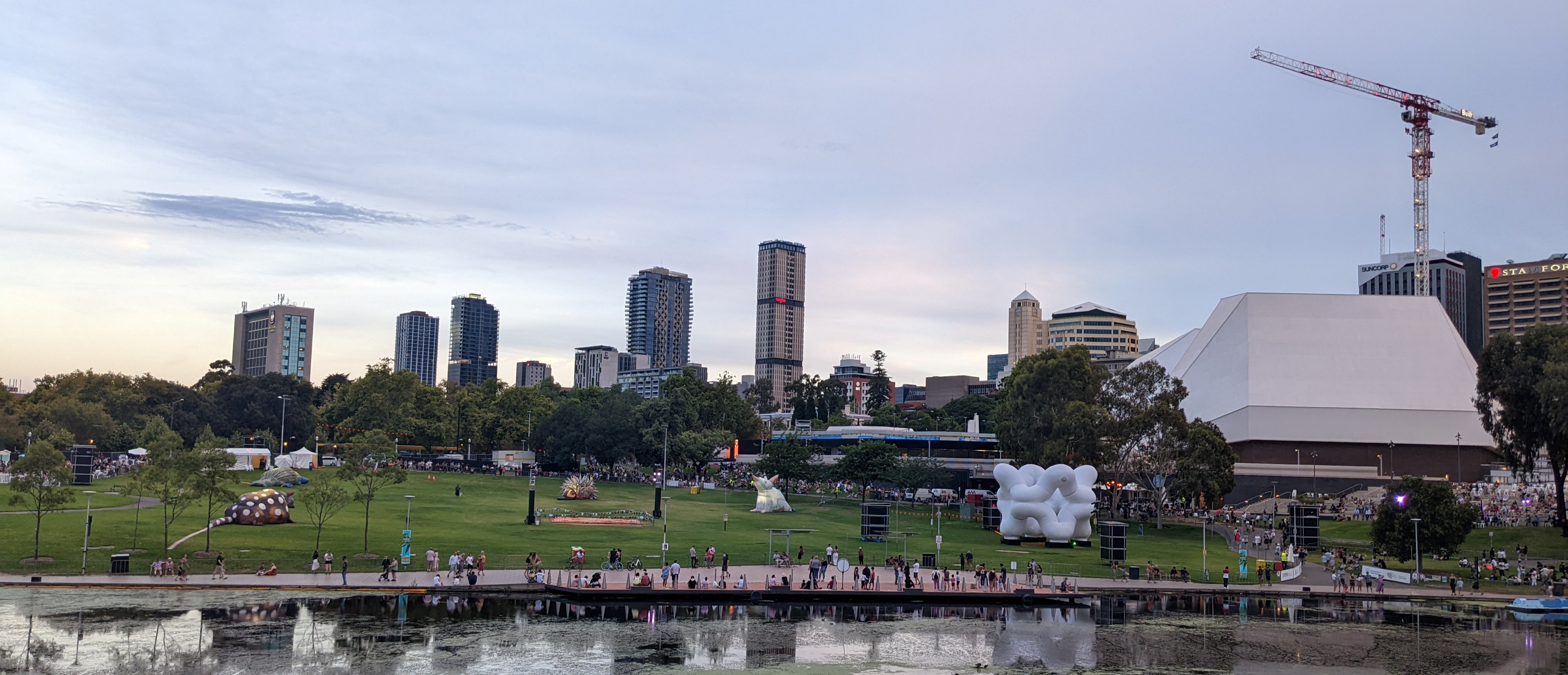
Adelaide's skyline during the 2022 Australia Day Celebrations

The current building boom is perhaps best encapsulated with the completion of Frome Central Tower One, also known as The Adelaidean, in 2020. At a height of 138 m (453 ft), the 37-storey mixed-use skyscraper took the title of Adelaide's tallest building from RAA Place. Located in the East End, the north-eastern point of the central business district, the tower was "a unique opportunity to lead Adelaide's CBD into a new era", and "will really be an extension of the city's skyline". The influx of buildings in the East End has been attributed to the opening of a new tram line serving the area in 2018. A tower for student accommodation, Yugo Adelaide City, was completed in 2022 next to The Adelaidean. Other high-rises that have extended the skyline towards the northeast include The Realm, the city's third tallest building, and The Switch Adelaide Central. The Realm, completed in 2020, is the city's tallest fully residential building, signifying growth in the city's luxury apartment market; in 2018, the building's penthouse was sold for A$5.2 million. The Switch Adelaide Central is branded as Australia's first "co-living skyscraper"

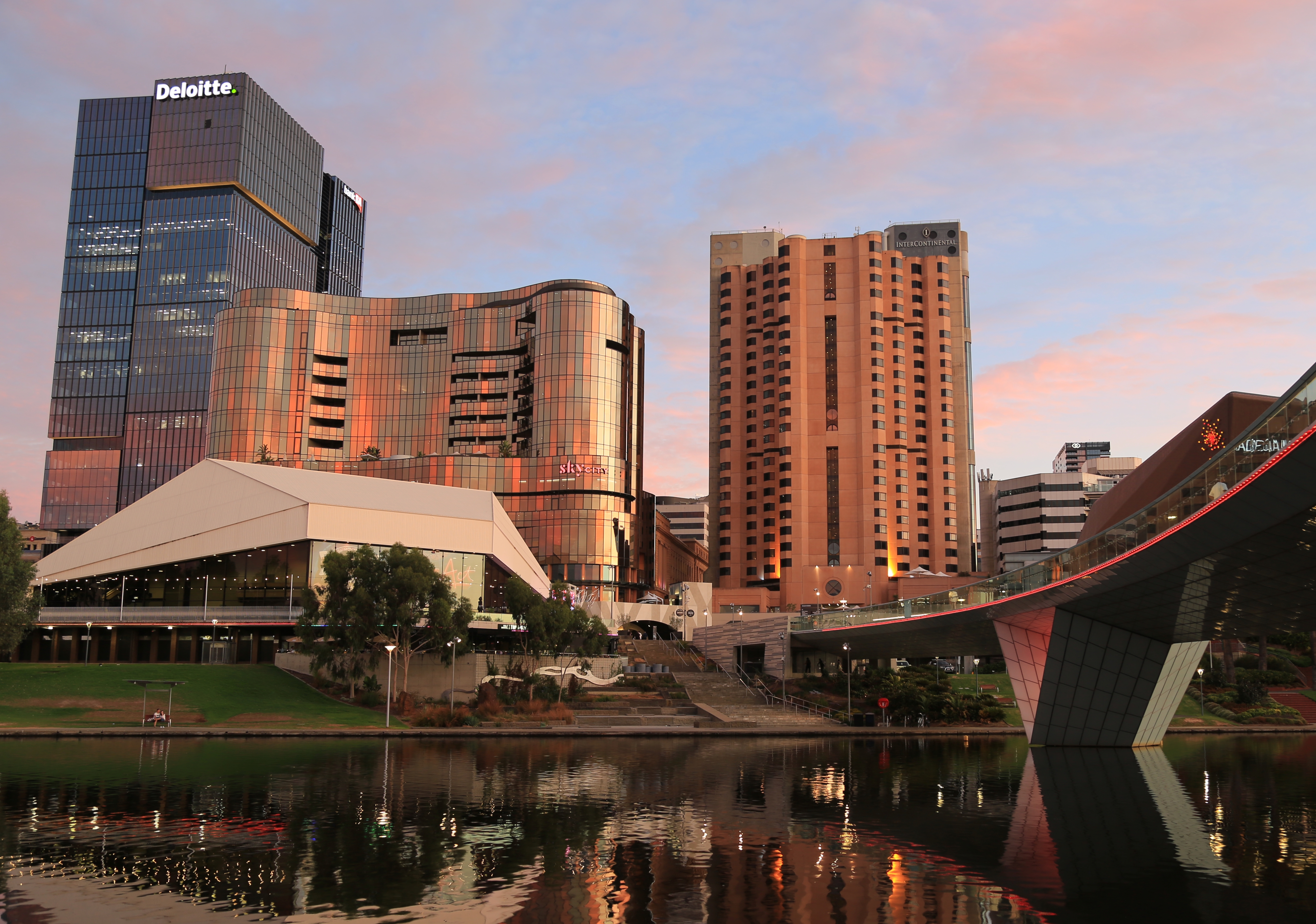
Adelaide Festival Centre (left), which will be adjoined to the upcoming Festival Tower 2.

In June 2025, planners approved a proposal for Adelaide's next tallest building, and its first skyscraper above 150 m (492 ft), the 38-storey Festival Tower 2. The tower will rise to 160 m (525 ft) tall, and will adjoin the existing 29-storey Festival Tower, which was built in 2023. Besides its height, the building planned to be sustainable, with "the biggest solar array of any commercial building in the city". It is intended to achieve carbon neutrality by 2028. The mixed-use tower would accommodate up to five thousand office workers, feature outdoor dining areas and retail tenancies on the ground floor, an elevated plaza space on level one, commercial office space, and a restaurant on level 36. The proposal has met some controversy due to its location on public land between the Adelaide Festival Centre and Parliament House. Nevertheless, according to planning minister Nick Champion, the building will "become a defining symbol of a city that is embracing a confident, modern future".

Construction commenced on an even taller skyscraper in the East End – the Keystone Tower – in 2026, after approval in 2024. Situated behind the heritage-listed Grand Lodge of the Australian Freemasons, the 37-storey mixed-use tower is planned to be 183 metres (600 ft) tall, and would include the city's first Westin Hotel.

== Cityscape ==
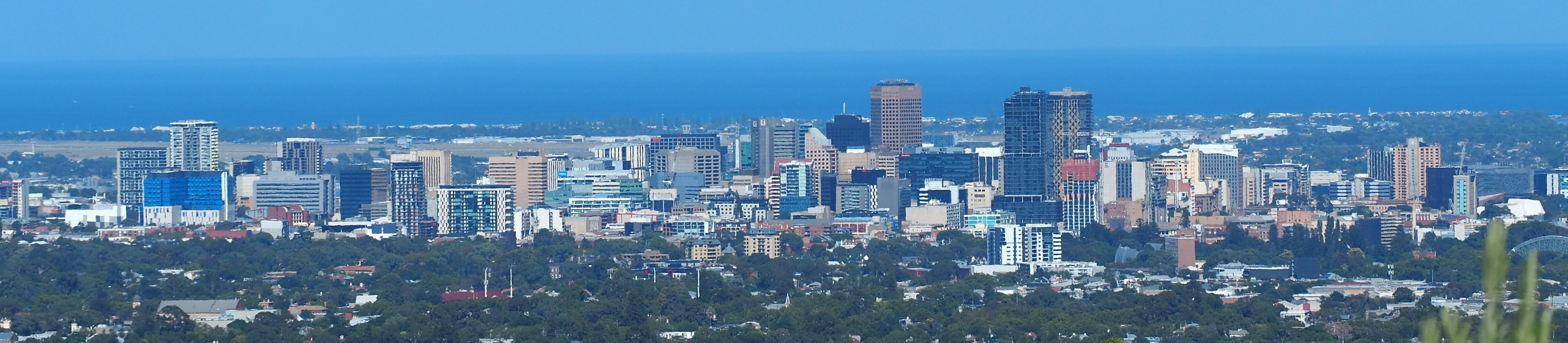
A panorama of Adelaide from Morialta Conservation Park, taken in 2021. Four of the city's tallest buildings can be seen rising above the skyline, from left to right: RAA Place, Frome Central Tower One, The Realm, and Yugo Adelaide City (under construction at the time).

== Map of tallest buildings ==
This map displays the location of every building taller than 75 m (246 ft) in Adelaide, all of which are in the city centre. Each marker is numbered by the building's height rank, and colored by the decade of its completion.

Buildings taller than 75 m (246 ft) in Adelaide.
- 1960s
- 1970s
- 1980s
- 1990s
- 2000s
- 2010s
- 2020s
1 Frome Central Tower One
2 Market Square North Tower
3 The Realm
4 RAA Place
5 Victoria Tower
6 Yugo Adelaide City
7 The Switch
8 Sofitel Adelaide
9 Festival Tower
10 30 Pirie Street
11 Kodo Apartments
12 Grenfell Centre
13 ANZ House
14 Y Suites on Frome
15 InterContinental Adelaide
16 77 Grenfell Street
17 115 King William Street
18 Vue on King William
19 83 Pirie
20 GPO Exchange
21 Little National Adelaide
22 Wingfold Tower
23 Penny Place
24 50 Franklin
25 80 Grenfell Street
26 1KWS
27 SKM House
28 Wakefield House
29 Myer Centre
30 Dwell Adelaide
31 One Adelaide

== Tallest buildings ==
This list ranks completed high-rises in Adelaide that stand at least 75 m (246 ft) tall as of 2026, based on standard height measurement. This includes spires and architectural details but does not include antenna masts. The “Year” column indicates the year of completion. Buildings tied in height are sorted by year of completion, and then alphabetically.

Was the tallest building in Adelaide upon completion

Rank	Name	Image	Location	Height m (ft)	Floors	Year	Purpose	Notes
1	Frome Central Tower One		11-27 Frome Street 34°55′19″S 138°36′27″E	138 (453)	37	2019	Mixed-use	Also known as The Adelaidean. Mixed-use with a Crowne Plaza hotel and residential apartments. Tallest building in Adelaide since 2019. First proposed in 2016, construction commenced in 2018. Tallest building completed in Adelaide in the 2010s.
2	Market Square North Tower		21-39 Grote Street 34°55′45″S 138°35′53″E	133.2 (437)	40	2026	Mixed-use	Includes residential apartments and a Treehouse hotel. First proposed in 2019, construction commenced in 2022. Tallest building in the Central Market Square complex and contains retail spaces at its base. Tallest building completed in Adelaide in the 2020s.
3	The Realm		9-19 Austin Street 34°55′20″S 138°36′17″E	132 (433)	40	2020	Residential	Tallest all-residential building in Adelaide. First proposed in 2016, construction commenced in 2017.
4	RAA Place		91 King William Street 34°55′29″S 138°35′55″E	131.6 (432)	31	1988	Office	Formerly known as Westpac House, Santos House, BankSA Building, and State Bank Building. First proposed in 1985, construction commenced in 1986. Tallest building in Adelaide from 1988 to 2019. Tallest office-only building in Adelaide. Tallest building completed in Adelaide in the 1980s.
5	Victoria Tower		32-38 Grote Street 34°55′42″S 138°35′52″E	120.2 (394)	38	2025	Mixed-use	Consists of commercial offices and residential apartments. First proposed in 2021, construction commenced in 2023.
6	Yugo Adelaide City		269 North Terrace 34°55′17″S 138°36′27″E	118.8 (390)	35	2022	Residential	Tallest purpose-built student accommodation building in Adelaide. First proposed in 2017, construction commenced in 2020.
7	The Switch Adelaide Central		203 North Terrace 34°55′18″S 138°36′10″E	118.4 (388)	35	2022	Residential	Student accommodation. First proposed in 2019, construction commenced in 2020.
8	Sofitel Adelaide		108 Currie Street 34°55′27″S 138°35′44″E	117 (384)	33	2020	Mixed-use	Also known as The Luminesque. Contains a Sofitel hotel alongside residential apartments. First proposed in 2014, construction commenced in 2018.
9	Festival Tower		Festival Centre Plaza 34°55′14″S 138°35′53″E	115 (377)	29	2023	Office	Contains the Flinders University City Campus. First proposed in 2013, construction commenced in 2021.
10	30 Pirie Street		30 Pirie Street 34°55′31″S 138°36′03″E	104 (341)	24	1987	Office	Formerly known as Telstra House. Tallest building in Adelaide from 1987 to 1988
11	Kodo Apartments		27-31 Angas Street 34°55′49″S 138°36′07″E	103.2 (339)	30	2019	Residential	
12	Grenfell Centre		25 Grenfell Street 34°55′29″S 138°36′03″E	103 (338)	26	1975	Office	Formerly known as Oracle House and JLW Building and informally nicknamed the Black Stump. Contains ground-level retail spaces. Construction commenced in 1973. Tallest building in Adelaide from 1975 to 1987. First building in Adelaide to surpass a height of 100m. Tallest building completed in Adelaide in the 1970s
13	ANZ House		11-29 Waymouth Street 34°55′34″S 138°35′56″E	99 (325)	21	2007	Office	Also known as City Central Tower 1.
14	Y Suites on Frome	–	188 Grenfell Street 34°55′25″S 138°36′30″E	98 (322)	29	2027	Residential	Student accommodation. Currently topped-out.
15	InterContinental Adelaide		120 North Terrace 34°55′14″S 138°35′47″E	91 (299)	24	1989	Hotel	Formerly known as Hyatt Regency Adelaide.
16	77 Grenfell Street		77 Grenfell Street 34°55′29″S 138°36′10″E	91 (299)	22	1991	Office	Formerly known as the Australis House. Tallest building completed in Adelaide in the 1990s
17	115 King William Street		115 King William Street 34°55′32″S 138°35′58″E	91 (299)	26	2016	Office	
18	Vue on King William		413 King William Street 34°56′06″S 138°36′00″E	89 (292)	28	2016	Residential	Stylized as VUEonKW
19	83 Pirie	–	73-85 Pirie Street 34°55′33″S 138°36′10″E	89 (292)	17	2022	Office	
20	GPO Exchange		177-179 Victoria Square 34°55′36″S 138°35′55″E	82 (269)	22	2019	Office	
21	Little National Adelaide		98-100 North Terrace 34°55′20″S 138°35′42″E	79 (259)	22	2026	Hotel	
22	Wingfold Tower		116–122 Waymouth Street 34°55′32″S 138°35′43″E	78.6 (258)	28	2020	Residential	
23	Penny Place		17 Penny Place 34°55′51″S 138°36′06″E	78 (256)	24	2021	Residential	
24	50 Franklin	–	42-56 Franklin Street 34°55′37″S 138°35′50″E	78 (256)	17	2025	Office	
25	80 Grenfell Street		80 Grenfell Street 34°55′25″S 138°36′09″E	76 (249)	15	2013	Office	Contains a shopping centre at the base.
26	1KWS		1 King William Street 34°55′19″S 138°35′57″E	75 (246)	19	1968	Office	Formerly known as the AMP Building and the Origin Energy House. Construction commenced in 1965. Tallest building in Adelaide from 1968 to 1971 and joint-tallest building in Adelaide from 1971 to 1975, sharing the title with SKM House. First building in Adelaide to surpass a height of 75m. Tallest building completed in Adelaide in the 1960s.
27	SKM House		33-39 King William Street 34°55′22″S 138°35′57″E	75 (246)	21	1971	Office	Formerly known as Hooker House, IMFC Building and Craminster House. Joint-tallest building in Adelaide from 1971 to 1975, sharing the title with 1KWS.
28	Wakefield House		30 Wakefield Street 34°55′41″S 138°36′07″E	75 (246)	20	1980	Office	
29	Myer Centre		14-38 Rundle Mall 34°55′18″S 138°36′03″E	75 (246)	18	1991	Office	Contains a shopping centre at the base.
30	Dwell Adelaide		Lot 101 Synagogue Place 34°55′20″S 138°36′25″E	75 (246)	21	2019	Residential	Also known more specifically as Dwell East End Adelaide Student Accommodation.
31	One Adelaide		260 Flinders Street 34°55′35″S 138°36′35″E	75 (246)	25	2019	Residential	

== Tallest under construction or approved ==
=== Under construction ===
The following table ranks high-rises that are under construction in Adelaide that are expected to be at least 75 m (246 ft) tall as of 2026, based on standard height measurement. The “Year” column indicates the expected year of completion. Buildings that are on hold are not included. A dash “–“ indicates information about the building's height or year of completion is not available.

Name	Location	Height m (ft)	Floors	Year	Purpose	Notes
Keystone Tower	254 North Terrace	183 (600)	37	–	Mixed-use	
Festival Tower 2	Festival Centre Plaza	160 (525)	38	2028	Office	
88 North Terrace	88 North Terrace	106 (348)	33	2028	Residential	Student accommodation
Y Suites on Frome	188 Grenfell Street	98 (322)	29	2027	Residential	Student accommodation. Currently topped-out.
Franklin Tower South	108-112A Franklin Street	86 (282)	25	2028	Residential	Student accommodation
Franklin Tower North	108-112A Franklin Street	83 (272)	24	2028	Residential	Student accommodation
Journal Uni Terrace	274-275 North Terrace	76.7 (252)	21	2028	Residential	Student accommodation

=== Approved ===
The following table ranks approved skyscrapers in Adelaide that are expected to be at least 75 m (246 ft) tall as of 2026, based on standard height measurement. The “Year” column indicates the expected year of completion. A dash “–“ indicates information about the building's height or year of completion is not available.

Name	Location	Height m (ft)	Floors	Year	Purpose	Notes
195 North Terrace	195 North Terrace	136 (446)	40	–	Residential	Student accommodation
Adelaide Central Plaza Tower	210 North Terrace	132 (433)	32	–	Mixed-use	
29 Twin Street Tower	27-29 Twin Street	123 (404)	36	–	Residential	Student accommodation, site-work preparation currently underway
101 Grenfell Street	47 Wyatt Street	119 (390)	36	–	Residential	Student accommodation, site-work preparation currently underway
56-62 Pulteney Street	56-62 Pulteney Street	116 (381)	35	–	Residential	Student accommodation
82-86 Currie Street	82-86 Currie Street	111 (364)	34	–	Residential	Student accommodation
237 Grote Street (Hero Building)	237 Grote Street	95 (312)	28	2034	Mixed-use	
Arcadia	299-311 Pirie Street	94 (308)	28	2028	Mixed-use	Construction expected to commence in early 2027
New Dawn Residences	33 Angas Street	81 (266)	22	–	Residential	Construction expected to commence in early 2027

== Tallest unbuilt ==
The following table ranks major cancelled, revised or unbuilt buildings designed to rise at least 150 m (492 ft) that were proposed or approved for construction within Adelaide but were ultimately cancelled prior to completion.

Name	Location	Height m (ft)	Floors	Year Proposed	Notes
Dominator 1	207-209 Pulteney Street	227 (745)	67	2016	Plans were shelved as the skyscraper breached Adelaide Airport's protected airspace.
Capital City Tower	100 Rundle Mall	200 (660)	–	1993	Approved, but plans collapsed due to the 1997 Asian financial crisis. Location was eventually used for the construction of the Adelaide Central Plaza.
SA1 Tower	207-209 Pulteney Street	180 (590)	55	2022	Plans were shelved after approval and the land was placed on sale.
The Signature	301-315 King William Street	150 (492)	40	2012	Plans failed to eventuate after funding was unable to be secured.

== Timeline of tallest buildings ==
The following table ranks building that were once the tallest in Adelaide in chronological order.

Name	Image	Location	Height m (ft)	Floors	Years as tallest
Adelaide Town Hall		128 King William Street	46 (151)	6	1865–1902 (37 years)
St Peter's Cathedral		27 King William Road	51 (167)	3	1902–1934 (32 years)
Colonial Mutual Life Building		41-49 King William Street	52 (171)	14	1934–1966 (32 years)
Reserve Bank of Australia		182-188 Victoria Square	67 (220)	18	1966–1968 (2 years)
1KWS		1 King William Street	75 (246)	19	1968–1975 (7 years)
SKM House		33-39 King William Street	75 (246)	21	1971-1975 (4 years)
Grenfell Centre		25 Grenfell Street	103 (338)	26	1975–1987 (12 years)
30 Pirie Street		30 Pirie Street	104 (341)	24	1987–1988 (1 year)
RAA Place		91 King William Street	132 (433)	31	1988–2019 (31 years)
Frome Central Tower One		11 Frome Street	138 (453)	37	2019–present

== See also ==
- List of tallest buildings in Australia
- List of tallest buildings in Oceania
