= Bank of New South Wales building, Brisbane =

Heritage listed building in Brisbane, Australia

Bank of New South Wales Building, Brisbane
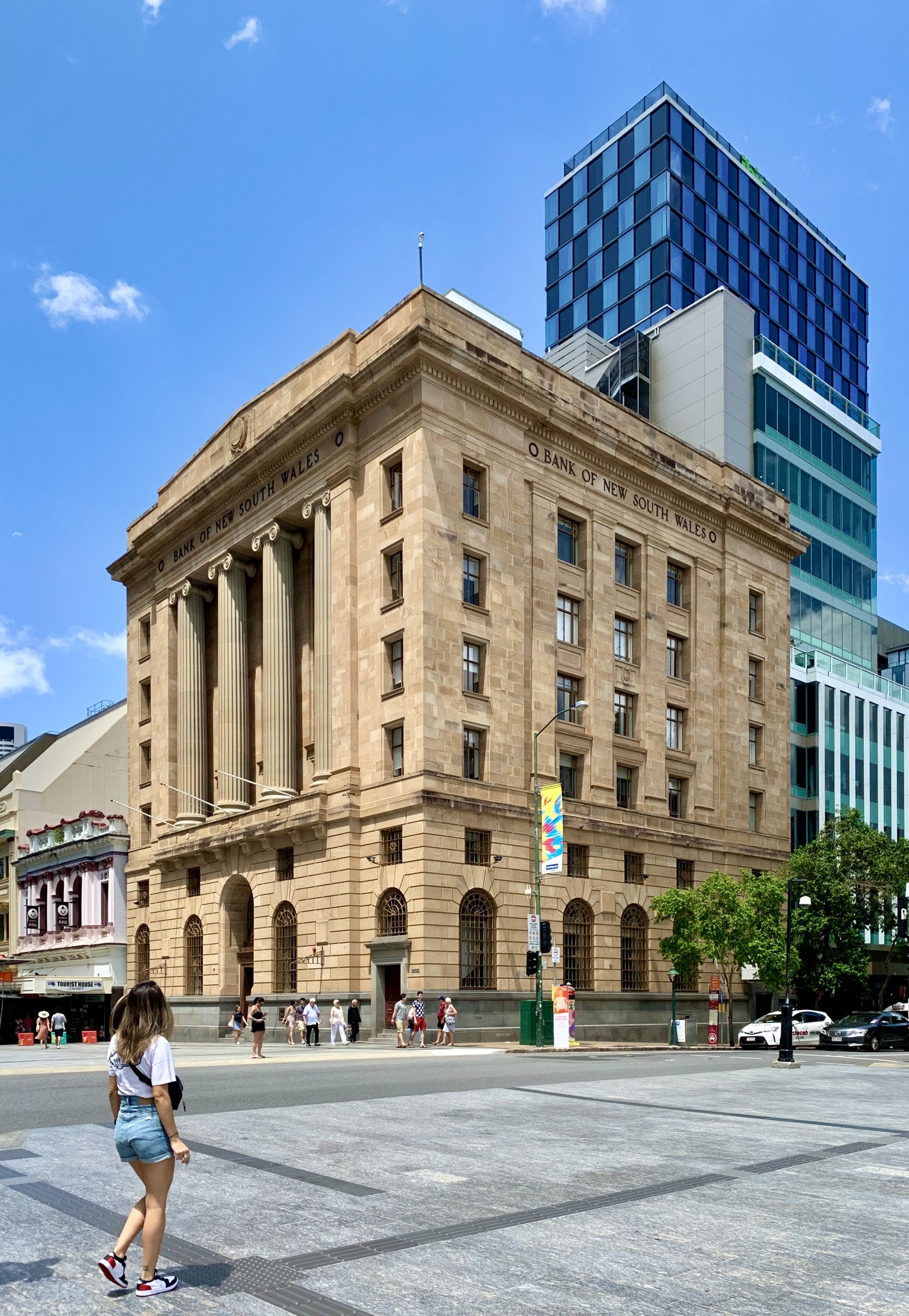
- Bank of New South Wales Building, 2020

- Location within Queensland
- 27.471°S 153.0239°E
- Location: 33 Queen Street, Brisbane City, City of Brisbane, Queensland, Australia

History
- Design period: 1919–1930s (interwar period)
- Built: 1928–1930

Site notes
- Architect: Hall & Devereux
- Architectural style: Beaux Arts
- Owner: Abacus Property Group

Queensland Heritage Register
- Official name: Westpac Bank Building, Bank of New South Wales Building
- Type: state heritage (built)
- Designated: 21 October 1992
- Reference no.: 600154
- Significant period: 1928–1929 (fabric); 1930–1970 (historical)
- Significant components: banking chamber, furniture/fittings
- Builders: F J Corbett & Sons

The Bank of New South Wales Building is a heritage-listed former bank building located at 33 Queen Street, Brisbane City, City of Brisbane, Queensland, Australia. It was designed by Hall & Devereux and built from 1928 to 1930 by F J Corbett & Sons. It is also known as Westpac Bank Building. It was added to the Queensland Heritage Register on 21 October 1992.

== History ==
This bank was constructed between 1928 and 1930, replacing an earlier building.

The Bank of New South Wales began operating on the site in rented premises in 1851. In 1853, the bank purchased the property and in 1866 erected a purpose-built bank with residence. The contractor was Hugo William Du Rietz.

This first building was demolished in 1928 and replaced by the current building which was completed in 1930. Designed by the firm of Hall and Devereux, it was erected by FJ Corbett & Sons for approximately £124,000. It was an example of the pervasive fashion for the neo-classical style in commercial and civic buildings of similar scale and materials during this period. 33 Queen Street remained the headquarters of the Bank of New South Wales until a new chief office was built in 1970. Later it became a branch of the Westpac Banking Corporation, a successor of the Bank of New South Wales.

In April 2013 the building was sold for $34 million to Abacus Property Group and is no longer used as a bank.

== Description ==
The Westpac Bank building is a six storeyed masonry building located on the corner of Queen and George Streets. The structure is steel-framed with reinforced concrete floors. It contains Neo-classical elements that were common in bank architecture of this period.

The main facades comprise Helidon freestone as a stone facing on a base of Uralla polished granite, that on Queen Street incorporating a "piano nobile" of giant order Ionic columns. This facade projects forward in the immediate area of the columns bringing them to greater prominence. The entablature above the columns incorporates the name "BANK OF NEW SOUTH WALES" into the frieze. A decorative dentil cornice line runs around the perimeter of the building above this. The parapet is relatively austere, and the portion above the columns rises to a low apex.

The George Street facade also contains five window bays. The three central ones are recessed rather than projecting.

The larger openings below the "piano nobile" are arched, with small square openings above them except the main entrance. The stone facing on this section resembles ashlar.

Internally the main banking chamber and its entry are predominantly intact. Both the foyer to George Street and that at the corner of Queen and George Streets have been refurbished. Giant order square columns rise from the ground floor through the mezzanine level with gilded corinthian capitals. The building has a rooftop atrium courtyard with cast iron Ionic columns, but this is now roofed over. These columns were verandah posts from the 1866 bank building and were incorporated in the design of the new building.

== Heritage listing ==
The Bank of New South Wales Building was listed on the Queensland Heritage Register on 21 October 1992 having satisfied the following criteria.

The place is important in demonstrating the evolution or pattern of Queensland's history.

The building and site are significant in illustrating the pattern and evolution of Queensland's history. The site has been associated with the Bank of New South Wales/Westpac since 1851.

The place demonstrates rare, uncommon or endangered aspects of Queensland's cultural heritage.

The building is significant as the predominantly intact 1920s interior of the ground floor banking chamber represents a rare aspect of Queensland's cultural heritage.

The place is important in demonstrating the principal characteristics of a particular class of cultural places.

The building is important in demonstrating the principal characteristics of an interwar neo-classical bank building.

The place is important because of its aesthetic significance.

The building is important in exhibiting aesthetic characteristics valued by the community, in particular the use of the neo-classical design for a 20th-century financial institution reflecting the dignity and solidity of such institutions and the quality and craftsmanship of the building's main interior spaces.

The building makes a significant contribution to the streetscape of Queen and George Streets.
