= Oasis Shopping Centre =

The Oasis Shopping Centre
- Location: Broadbeach, Queensland, Australia
- Coordinates: 28.0296°S 153.4327°E
- Address: Surf Parade
- Opened: 29 August 1989; 37 years ago
- Owner: Abacus Property Group
- Floor area: 22,338 m^{2} (240,440 sq ft)
- Floors: 3
- Website: www.oasisshoppingcentre.com.au

The Oasis Shopping Centre is located on the Broadbeach Mall in Broadbeach, Gold Coast, Queensland, Australia.

It was purchased by Brookfield Asset Management in 2012 from Thakral Holdings. In March 2015, it was purchased by Abacus Property Group and KKR.

== History ==
The site was a former mineral sand mine before construction of the Lennons Broadbeach Hotel in 1955. The hotel was demolished in 1987 and the site redeveloped into the Oasis Centre opening on 29 August 1989.

== Stores and services ==
In addition to retail stores, the centre has doctors, dentists, and fitness, massage, yoga, accounting, financial and legal advisers, a Language school and travel club.

== Monorail ==
The Oasis Shopping Centre operated a monorail service from 1989 until 2017. Originally known as the Gol’Coasta, the service ran a loop between Beachside station and Sofitel station, located within the shopping centre, and to Jupiter's Casino station.
