= RAA Place =

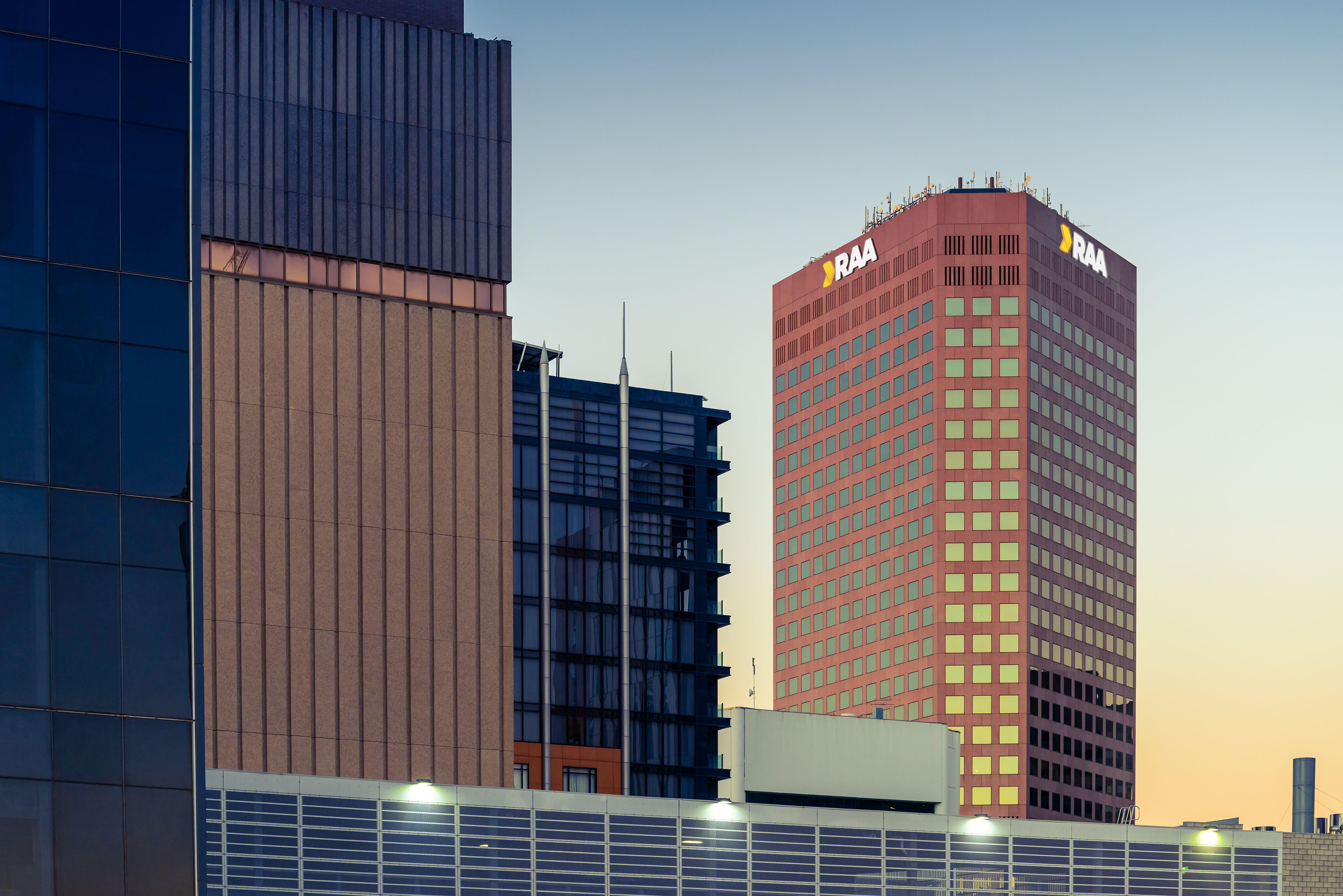
- RAA Place, concept image of new sign
- Interactive map of the RAA Place area
- Former names: State Bank Building; BankSA Building; Santos House; Westpac House
- Etymology: RAA

General information
- Status: Completed
- Type: Commercial
- Architectural style: Modernist
- Location: Adelaide, South Australia, 91 King William Street
- Coordinates: 34°55′29″S 138°35′54″E
- Current tenants: RAA; Federal government; HWL Ebsworth; SA Government
- Construction started: 1986; 40 years ago
- Completed: 1988; 38 years ago
- Cost: A$98 million, equivalent to A$251 million in 2022
- Owner: Abacus Property (50%); Inheritance Capital Asset Management (50%)

Height
- Roof: 132 m (433 ft)

RAA Place (originally the State Bank Building, and also known by other names) is an office building located at 91 King William Street, Adelaide. It is a 31-storey office tower, reaching 132 metres (433 ft) at its roof, with each level approximately 4.2 metres (14 ft) in height. From 1988 until 2019, it was the tallest building in Adelaide.

Originally built for the State Bank of South Australia, it was renamed after the State Bank collapsed in 1991 as the BankSA Building to reflect the surviving bank's new name. It was purchased by Santos and renamed Santos House in February 1997. From 2007 to 2022, after Westpac acquired BankSA, it was known as Westpac House. In December 2022, RAA purchased naming rights to the tower.

== History ==
The structure was opened as the State Bank Building in 1988. From its completion, RAA Place was the tallest building in Adelaide, before being surpassed by Frome Central Tower One in 2019. It briefly bore BankSA's sturt desert pea logo.

In 2007, Santos moved its headquarters into a new building on Flinders Street, and BankSA's new owners, Westpac, re-acquired the naming rights to the building.

In the lead up to (and during) major holidays, the windows were selectively lit up in formation. These include a white cross for Easter and Anzac Day, and a tree (in fluorescent green) for Christmas.

Abacus Property acquired a half interest in Santos House in October 2004 and the remaining 50 per cent in 2015. It sold 50 per cent to Inheritance Capital Asset Management in 2016.

In May 2007, the "Santos" sign on the building was removed and a single red "W", the Westpac logo, replaced it.

On 9 December 2022, removal of the Westpac logo from the building's fascia commenced, after Westpac moved its headquarters.

In December 2022 the Royal Automobile Association (RAA) secured two floors and signage rights for the building, which was renamed RAA Place in April 2023.

Installation of RAA signage on the building's fascia commenced on 22 May 2023 on its western side. Unlike previous signage on the building, it has the ability to change colours — deviating from the established yellow-and-white found on the RAA logo — dynamically.

== Description ==
The building is a 31-storey office tower, reaching 132 metres (433 ft) at its roof.

From 1988 until 2019, it was the tallest building in Adelaide, succeeding 30 Pirie Street and being surpassed by Frome Central Tower One in 2019.

== See also ==
- List of tallest buildings in Adelaide
