= Hansen Yuncken =

Australian construction company

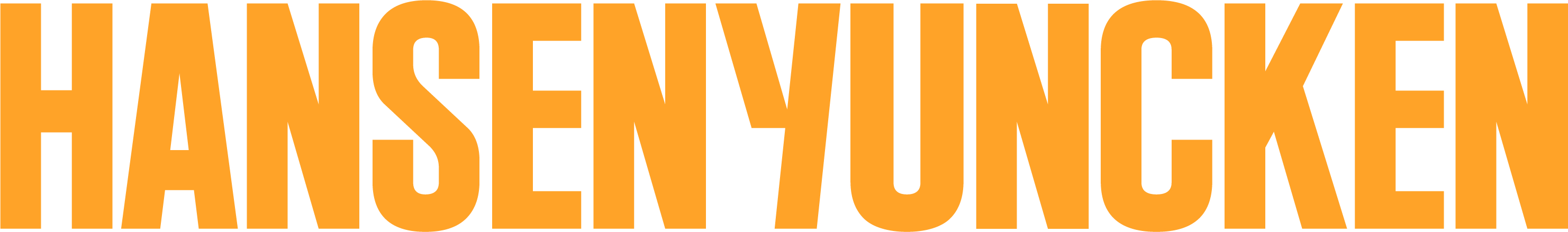
- Industry: Construction
- Founded: 1918
- Founder: Lauritz Hansen; Otto Yuncken
- Headquarters: Melbourne, Australia
- Key people: George Bardas (CEO)
- Revenue: A$1.15 billion (FY2014)
- Website: www.hansenyuncken.com.au

Hansen Yuncken is an Australian construction company, founded in 1918.

== History ==
Hansen Yuncken was founded in Melbourne, Australia in 1918 by Lauritz Hansen and Otto Yuncken. Hansen was born near Korsør in Denmark in 1867. In 1925 a regional branch opened in Shepparton. Further branches were opened in Hobart in 1937 and Adelaide in 1939.

In the late 1960s a Northern Territory office opened. In 1989, the company commenced operations in New South Wales, initially in joint venture, but now operating in its own right. In 2006 an office opened in Newcastle to serve the Hunter Valley. In 2007 and 2009 offices opened in Cairns and Townsville.

== Notable projects ==
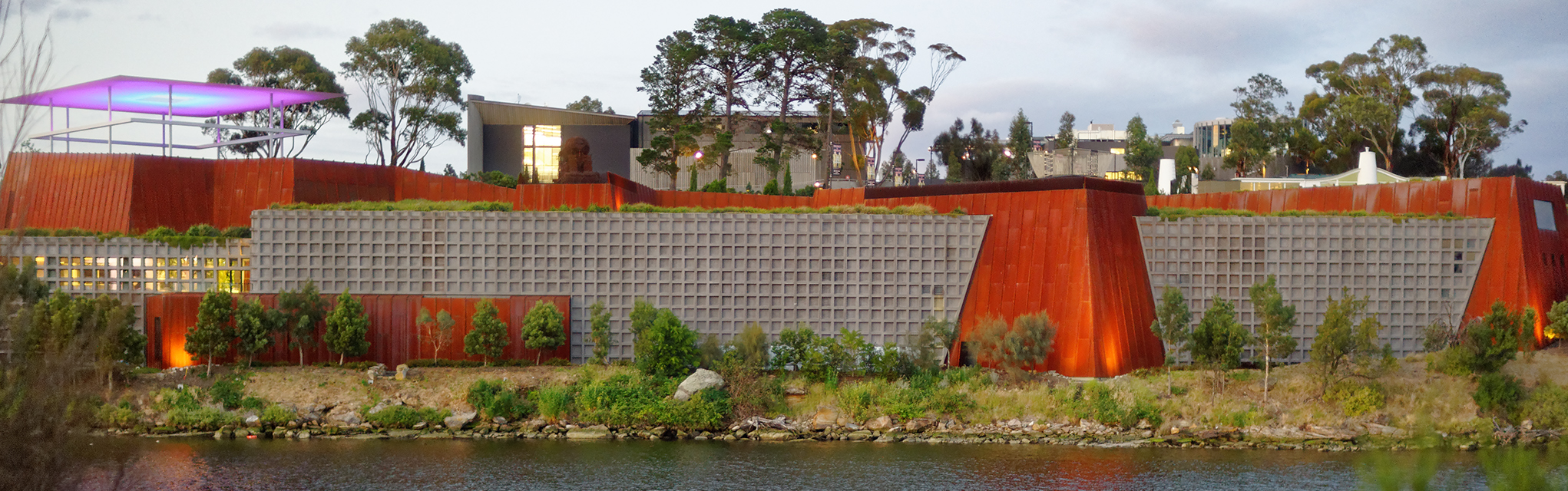
Museum of Old & New Art

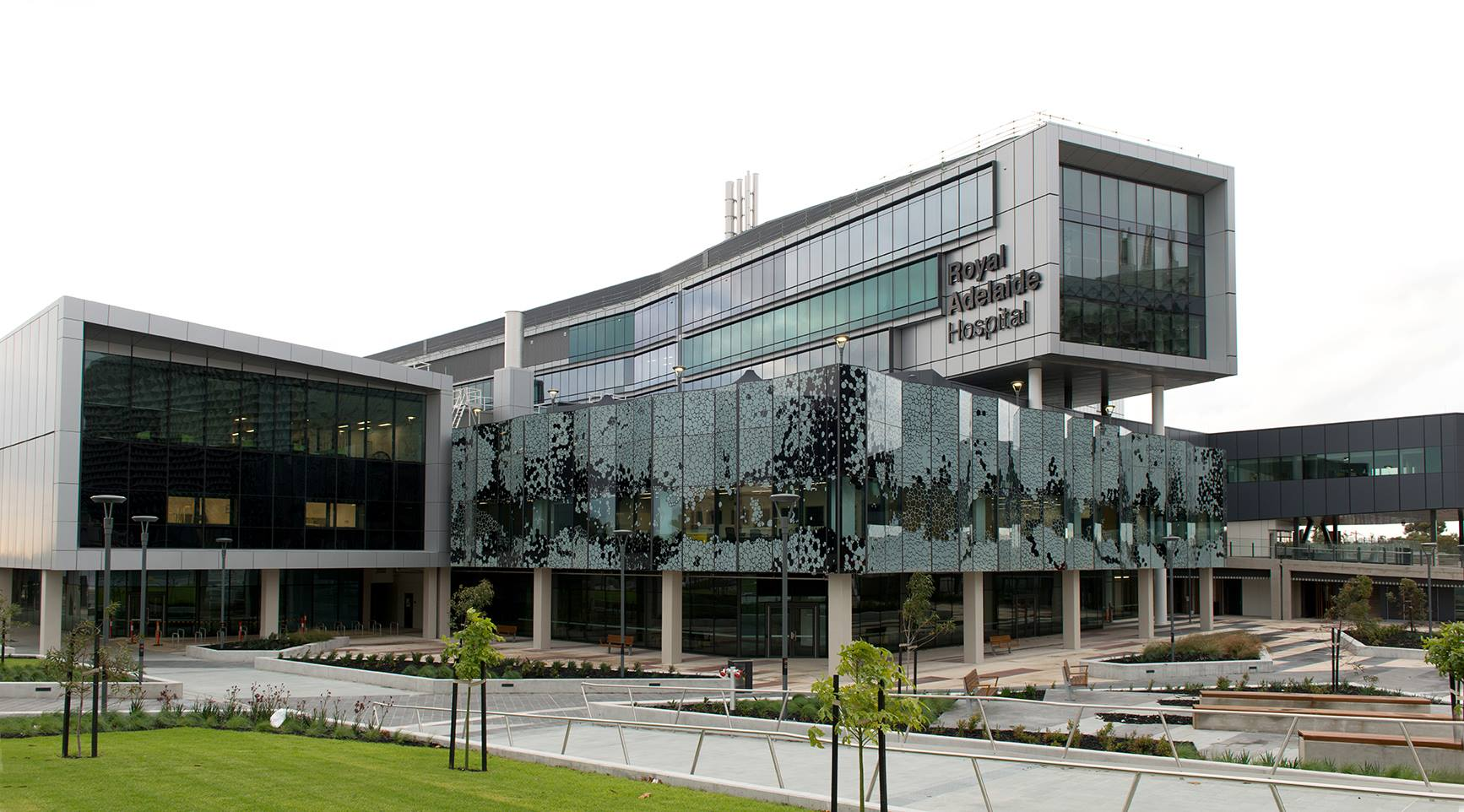
Royal Adelaide Hospital

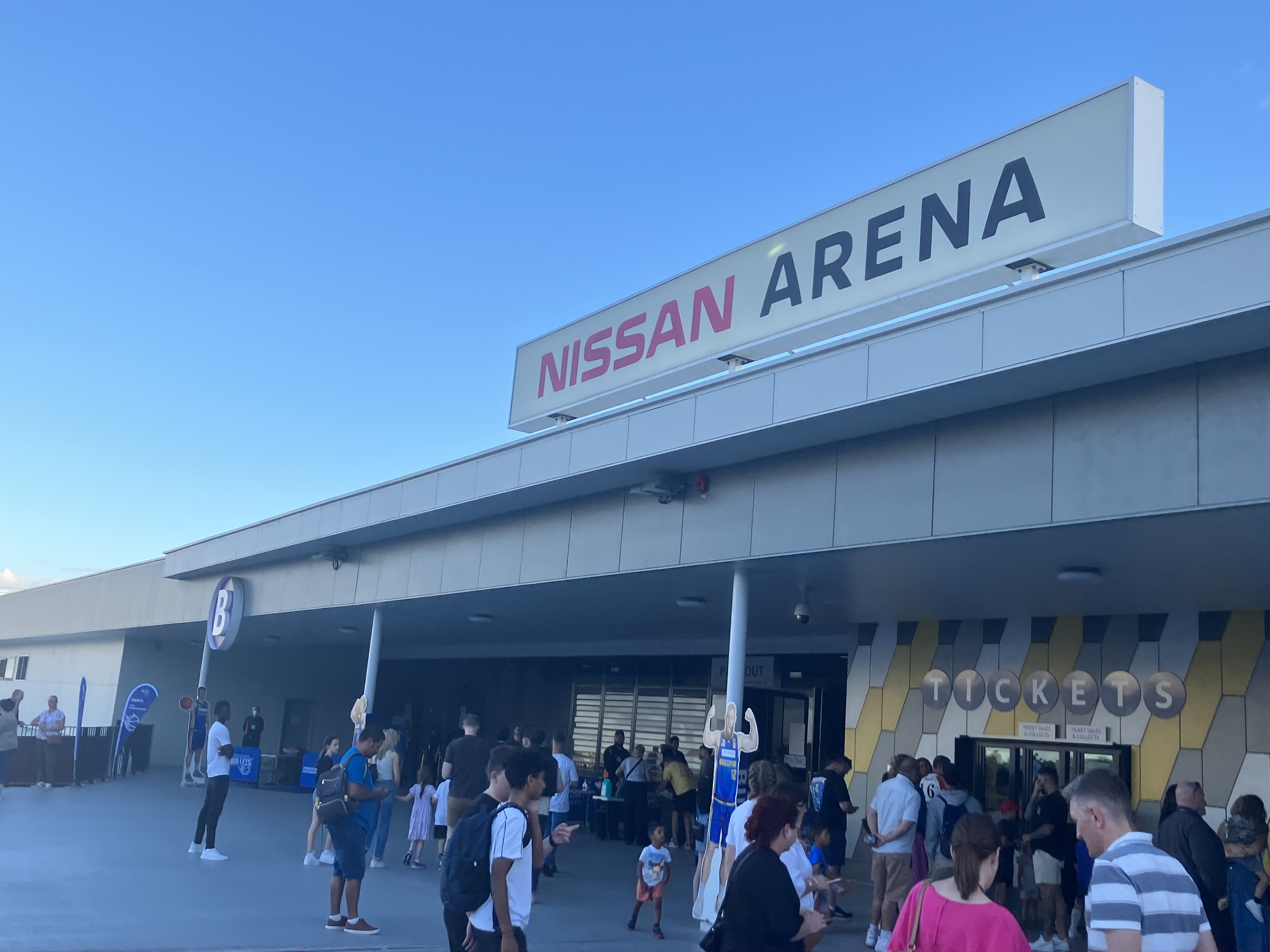
Queensland State Netball Centre

Notable projects completed by Hansen Yuncken have included:

- 30 Pirie Street, Adelaide
- Adelaide Airport new terminal
- Adelaide Botanic Garden Bicentennial Conservatory
- Adelaide Casino
- Adelaide Entertainment Centre extension
- Alfred Hospital Main Ward Block
- Bank of New South Wales Building
- Boyer Mill
- Coomera Indoor Sports Centre
- Council House 2
- Derwent Entertainment Centre
- Emporium Melbourne
- Glen Eira Sports & Aquatic Centre
- Hobart railway station
- Launceston Airport terminal building
- Museum of Old & New Art
- Myponga Reservoir, joint venture with John Holland
- Newcastle Airport expansion
- Orange Base Hospital
- Royal Adelaide Hospital, joint venture with Leighton Contractors
- Richmond Oval grandstand
- Royal Hobart Hospital
- Queensland State Netball Centre
- Sydney Coliseum Theatre
