= Grenfell Centre =

High rise building in Adelaide, South Australia

Coordinates: 34°55′29″S 138°36′2″E

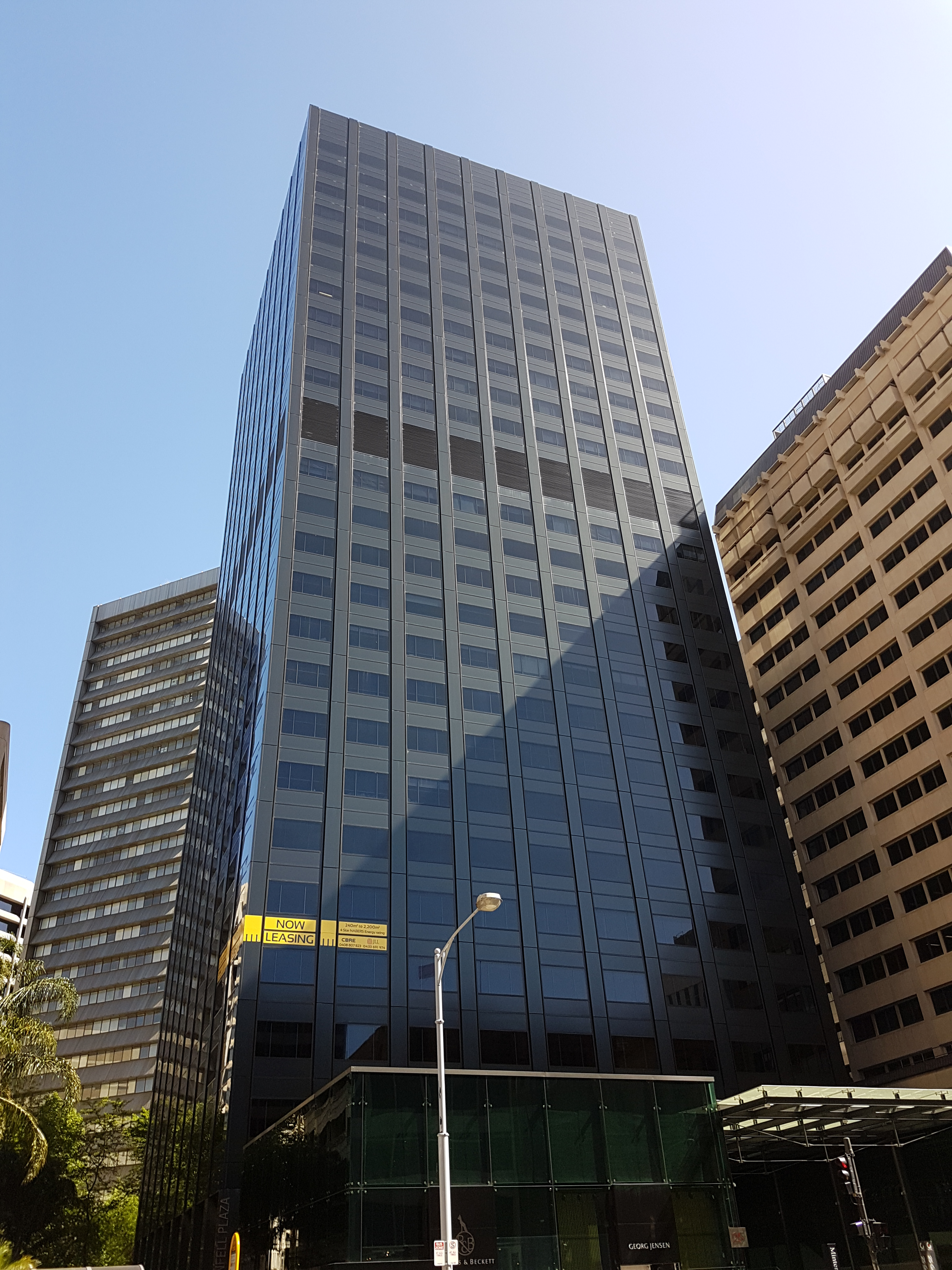
- Interactive map of the Grenfell Centre area
- Alternative names: Oracle House, JLW Building, Black Stump (nickname)

General information
- Architectural style: International
- Location: 25 Grenfell Street, Adelaide, South Australia
- Construction started: 1973
- Completed: 1975
- Renovated: 1979, 2007, 2023

Height
- Tip: 114 metres (374 ft)
- Roof: 103 metres (338 ft)
- Top floor: 26

Technical details
- Floor count: 27
- Lifts/elevators: 8

Design and construction
- Architects: Cheesman Doley Neighbour & Raffen Hannaford, Pellew & Hodgkison
- Architecture firm: MPH Architects
- Awards: Royal Australian Institute of Architects Commercial Architecture Award of Commendation

Grenfell Centre, formerly known as Oracle House and JLW Building, nicknamed Black Stump, is a high rise office building located at 25 Grenfell Street in the Adelaide city centre, South Australia.

== History and description ==
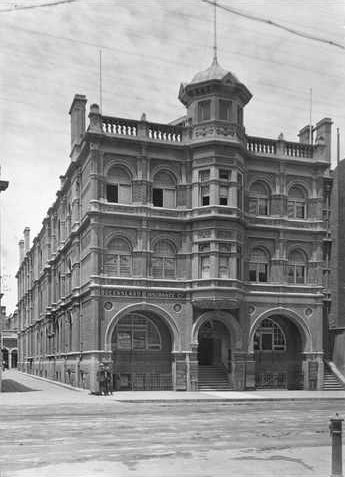
Brookman Building(s), December 1907

The Brookman Building(s), (Note: Not to be confused with the present Brookman Building.) designed by Alfred Wells and built in 1897, once stood on the site of the present Grenfell Centre. It was originally three storeys high, with an oriel window creating a fourth storey. In 1914, another two storeys were added. The building was owned by South Australian mining entrepreneurs George Brookman and his brother William Brookman, who founded the Coolgardie Gold Mining and Prospecting Company in the gold fields of Western Australia. A building of the same name still exists at the Adelaide University's North Terrace campus, originally the South Australian School of Mines and Industries.

After the Brookman Building was demolished in the early 1970s, the new office tower was completed in 1973. It was the tallest building in Adelaide at 103 metres (338 ft), until surpassed by 30 Pirie Street in 1987.

The building has 26 floors. In the 1980s, the building's foyer and interior were refurbished. A 10-metre (33 ft) antenna was attached in 1980, and upgraded with digital transmitters in 2003, increasing the height a metre further.

In 2007, the building was redeveloped, and two frameless glass cubes were constructed at the entrance of the building. This redevelopment earned it the Royal Australian Institute of Architects Commercial Architecture Award of Commendation.

Other names during its lifetime have been Oracle House and JLW Building. Its nickname, "black stump", in reference to the building's appearance, is also a colloquial Australian phrase.

In October 2021 the Grenfell Centre was acquired by Centuria and MA Financial JV, at a purchase price of A$166.6m. With a vacancy rate of 10%, the company planned to refurbish the building.

In February 2023, re-cladding of the building was complete, after works had been undertaken to replace the aluminium composite cladding (which had been implicated in the rapid spread of the fatal Grenfell Tower fire in London, as well as other fires around the world) with solid 3 mm (0.12 in) aluminium cladding. The project included extra insulation behind the cladding.

== See also ==
- List of tallest buildings in Adelaide
