= 115 King William Street =

Building in Adelaide, South Australia

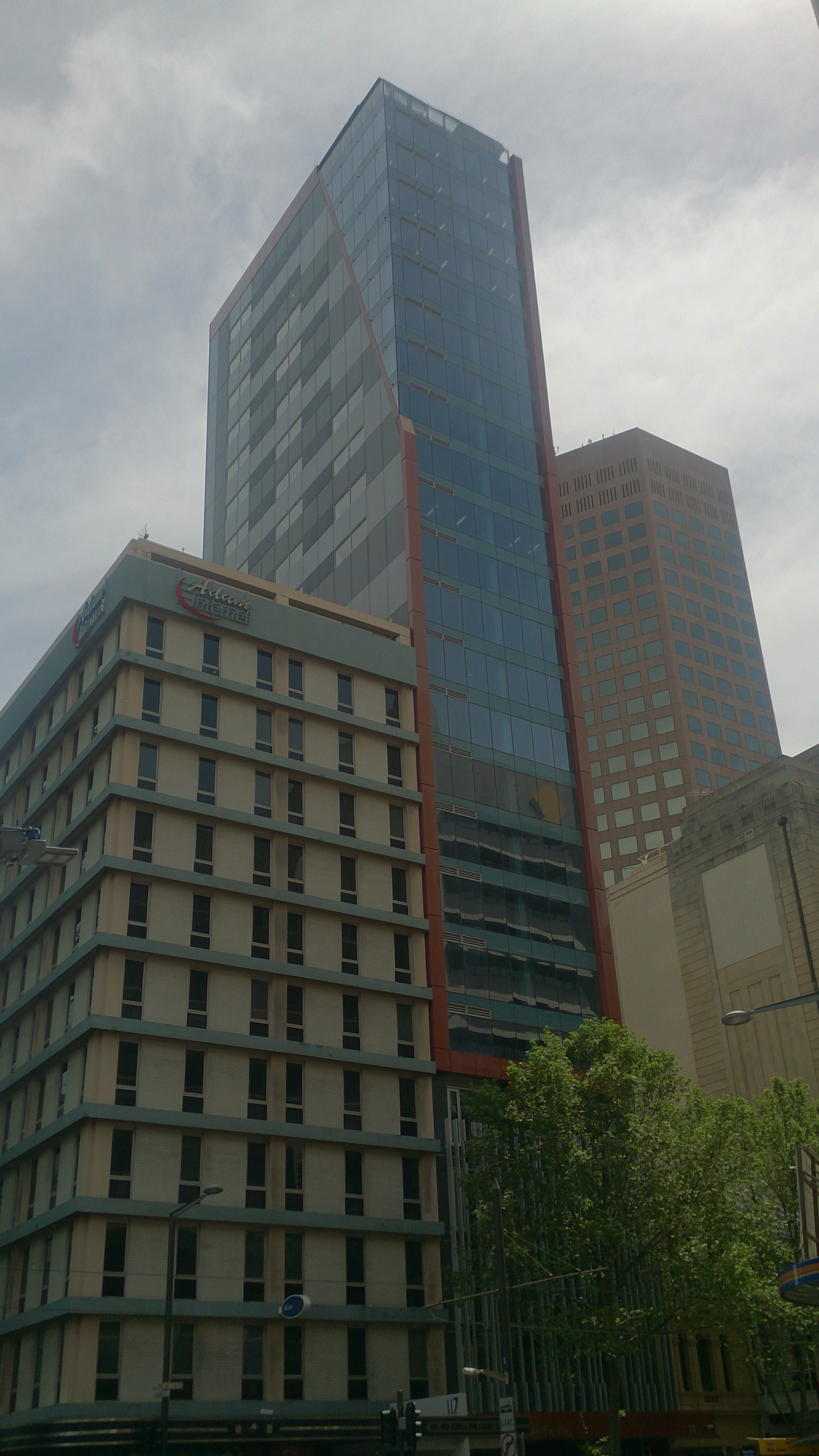
- 115 King William Street taken in October 2016

General information
- Type: Commercial/Retail
- Location: Adelaide, South Australia
- Coordinates: 34°55′29″S 138°35′54″E
- Construction started: 2015
- Completed: 2016

Height
- Antenna spire: 91 m (299 ft)
- Roof: 87 m (285 ft)

Technical details
- Floor count: 26

Design and construction
- Architect: Dash Architects
- Main contractor: Synergy Construct

115 King William Street is a high-rise building located on the west side of King William Street in the Adelaide city centre between Waymouth and Currie streets. It rises 87 metres to the roof and 91 metres to the antenna spire. The building has 26 storeys. Construction of the building began in 2015 and was completed in 2016. 115 King William Street is the sixteenth tallest building in Adelaide.

== History ==
115 King William Street has historically been an address associated with commercial offices. In the nineteenth century it was the office and home of a solicitor, George Michell. In the early twentieth century, it was the site of Commercial Union Chambers, which hosted a range of commercial offices, including its main tenant the Commercial Union Assurance Company. From the 1930s onwards, it became associated with the premises of Scrymgour & Sons, a printing business.

115 King William Street was approved by the Development Assessment Commission on 12 July 2010, with its original design only being 64 metres and 16 storeys tall. Later on, the building was approved to be 25 floors high and in August 2015 was granted permission to have another 1 storey making it 26 storeys high.

== See also ==
- List of tallest buildings in Adelaide
- King William Street
