= Frome Central Tower One =

Skyscraper in Adelaide, South Australia

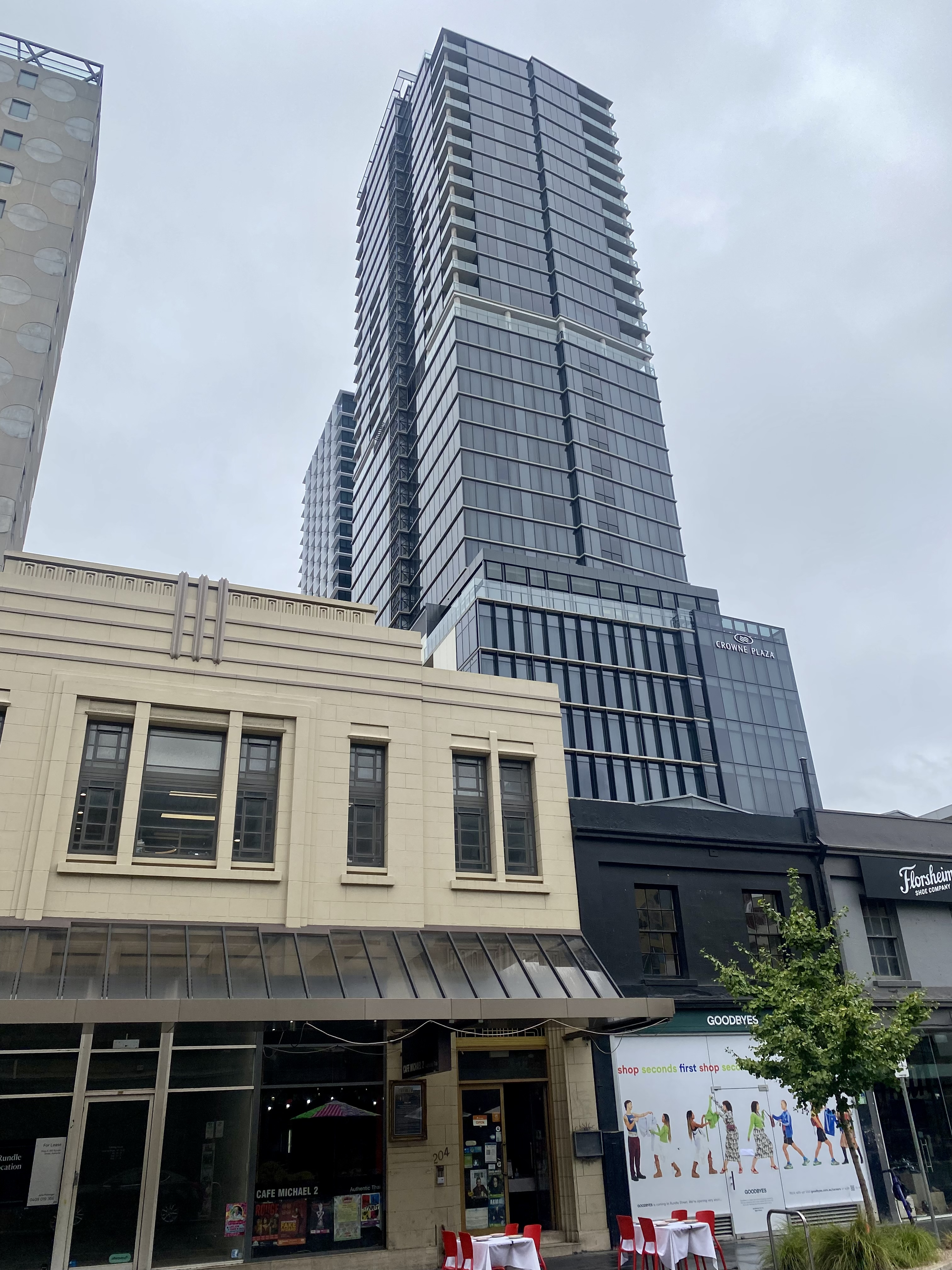
- Frome Central Tower One in 2023
- Alternative names: The Adelaidean

General information
- Status: Completed
- Type: Mixed-use
- Location: Adelaide, South Australia, 27 Frome Street
- Coordinates: 34.921995°S 138.607594°E
- Construction started: 2018; 8 years ago
- Completed: 2019; 7 years ago
- Opened: 2020; 6 years ago

Height
- Roof: 138 m (453 ft)

Technical details
- Floor count: 36

Design and construction
- Architecture firm: Brown Falconer
- Developer: Kyren Group

Frome Central Tower One (also known as The Adelaidean) is a mixed use hotel and residential skyscraper in Adelaide, South Australia. The tower stands at a height of 138 metres, which makes it the tallest building in both Adelaide and South Australia, surpassing RAA Place upon completion.

== History ==
The building was designed by architectural firm Brown Falconer. Construction works of the building, developed by Kyren Group, began in 2018 and were completed in 2020. In 2018, it was announced that the tower would also house a Crowne Plaza hotel, later inaugurated in 2020.

== See also ==
- List of tallest buildings in Adelaide
