= 30 Pirie Street =

Building in Adelaide, Australia

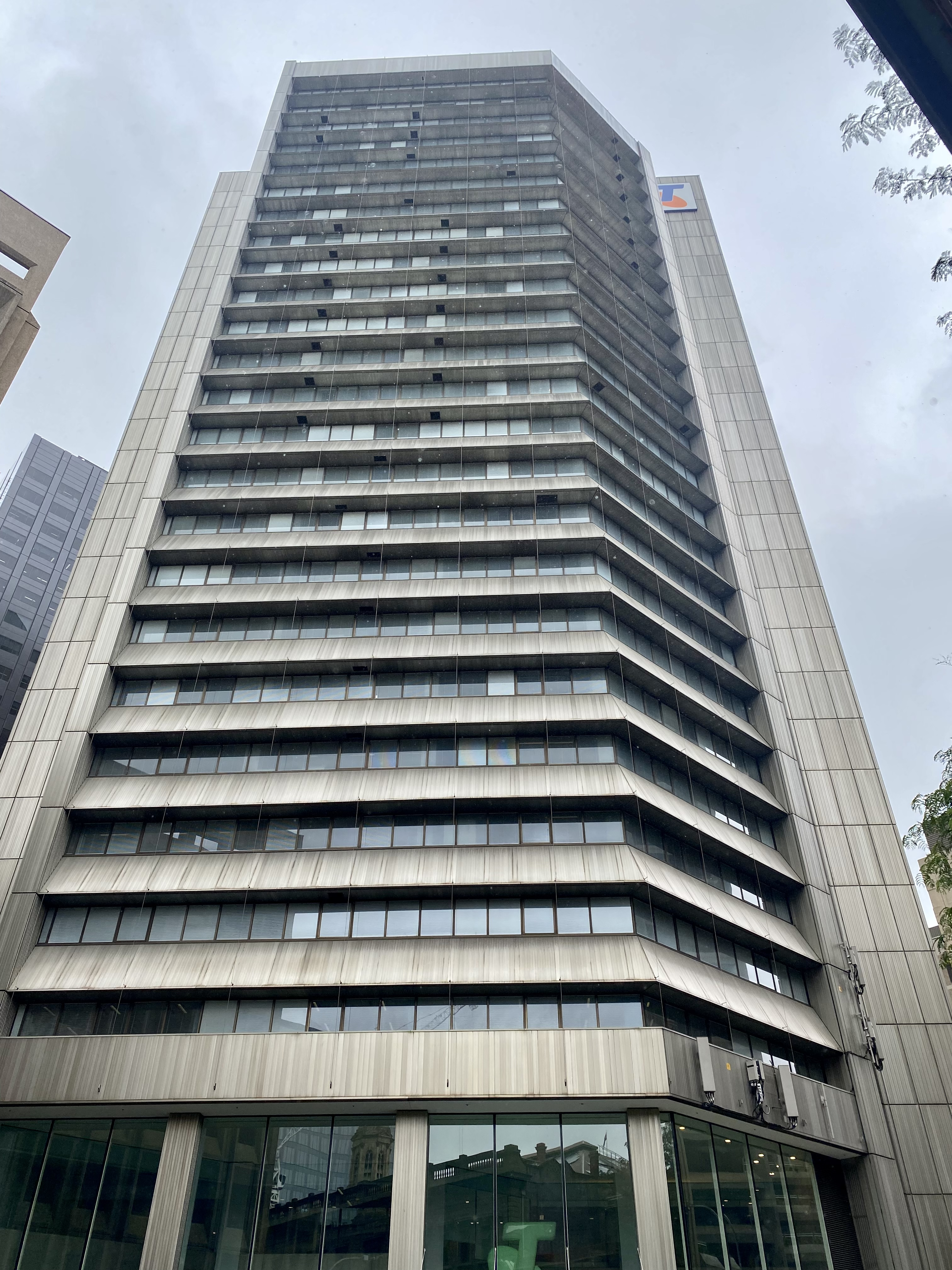
- 30 Pirie Street in 2023
- Interactive map of the 30 Pirie Street area
- Former names: Telecom House, Telstra House

General information
- Type: Commercial
- Location: 30 Pirie Street, Adelaide, South Australia
- Coordinates: 34.9253°S 138.6009°E
- Construction started: 1984
- Completed: 1987
- Renovated: 2019
- Owner: Quintessential

Height
- Roof: 104 m (341 ft)

Technical details
- Floor count: 23

Design and construction
- Main contractor: Hansen Yuncken

Website
- www.30pirie.com.au

30 Pirie Street, formerly Telstra House, is a high-rise building that is located in the Adelaide central business district on the northern side of Pirie Street. It rises 117 metres above the ground and has 23 floors.

Construction of the building by Hansen Yuncken began in 1984 and was completed in 1987. Upon completion, Telecom House surpassed Grenfell Centre as the tallest building in Adelaide at 104 metres (341 ft), before being succeeded by the Westpac House in 1988.

A major refurbishment of the building took place in 2019.

30 Pirie Street was originally owned by Telstra but later sold to Australian Unity. Telstra vacated the building in August 2023.

In December 2022, it was acquired by Quintessential, a privately owned property development company, for $73 million and rebranded as 30 Pirie Street.
