= Market Square, Adelaide =

Market Square
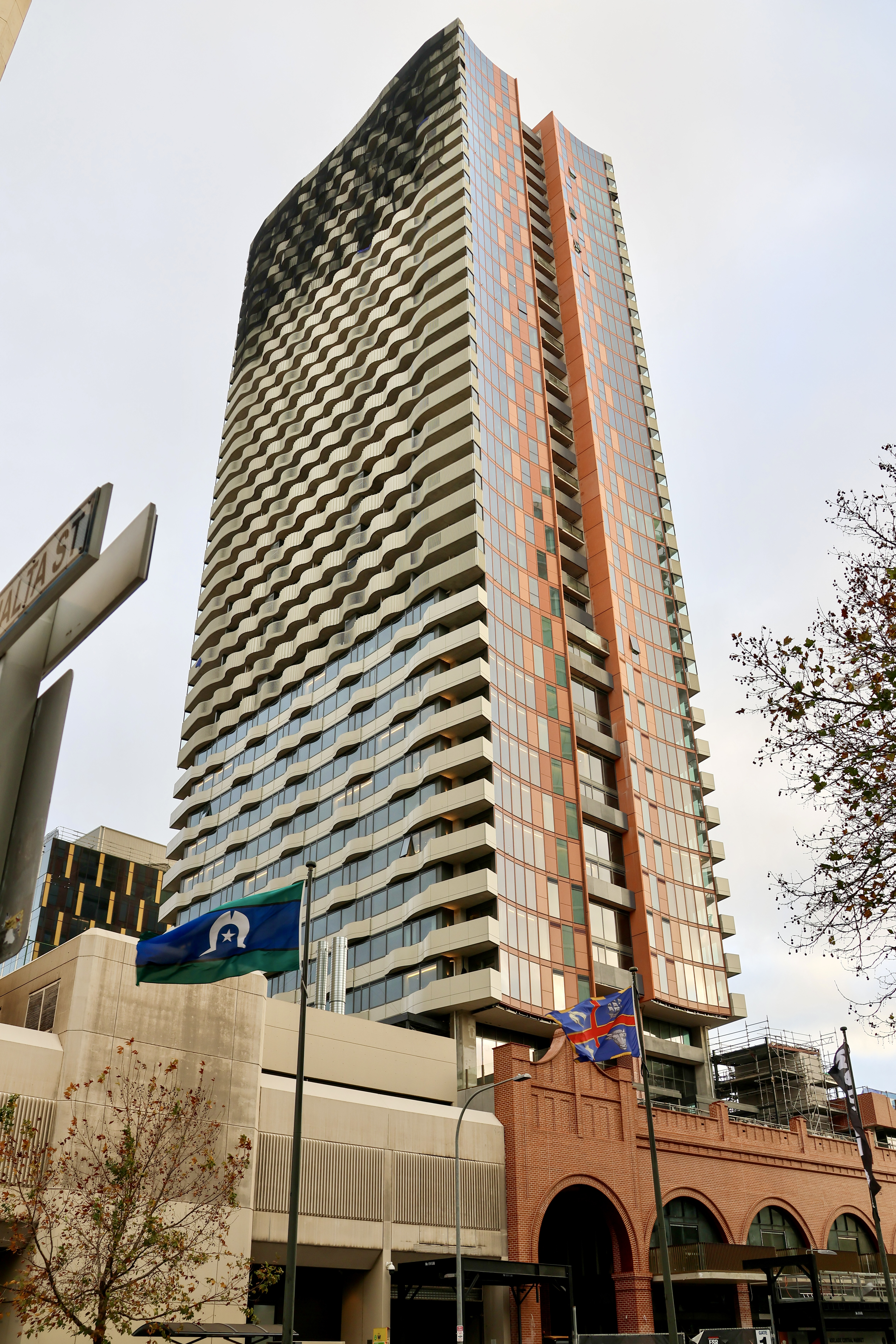
- Market Square in 2026

General information
- Status: Topped-out
- Type: Mixed-use
- Location: Adelaide, South Australia, Australia, 21-39 Grote Street
- Coordinates: 34.929536°S 138.598013°E
- Construction started: 2022; 4 years ago

Height
- Height: North Tower: 133 m (436 ft); South Tower: 56 m (184 ft)

Technical details
- Floor count: North Tower: 40 floors; South Tower: 13 floors

Design and construction
- Architecture firm: Woods Bagot
- Main contractor: Multiplex

Market Square is a mixed-use skyscraper complex in Adelaide, Australia, which is currently under construction. Designed by Woods Bagot, the two towers comprising the complex will stand at a height of 133 m (436 ft) and 56 m (184 ft).

== History ==
The complex was developed by a joint venture between the real estate developer ICD Property and the City of Adelaide, with the aim of redeveloping the site of the former Central Market Arcade through a large-scale urban renewal project.

Construction of the complex, designed by the architecture firm Woods Bagot and built by the construction company Multiplex, began in 2021. The South Tower was completed and opened in mid 2026, while residents are scheduled to move into the North Tower beginning in November 2026. The entire complex was scheduled for completion by the end of 2026, however delays pushed the opening of the retail portion to early 2027.

== Description ==
Located in Adelaide's Central Business District, the complex consists of a podium containing a shopping arcade, above which rise two towers. The shorter tower, standing 56 metres tall, is intended for commercial office use, while the taller 40-storey tower will house a hotel and residential spaces.

== See also ==
- List of tallest buildings in Adelaide
