= Abacus Group =

Australian public company

- Type: Public company
- Traded as: ASX: ABG
- Founded: 1996
- Headquarters: Sydney, Australia
- Areas served: Australia
- Key people: Steven Sewell (managing director); Mark Haberlin (chairman)
- Revenue: ▼ A$284.3 million (2020)
- Net income: ▼ A$84.7 million (2020)
- Total assets: ▼ A$245.8 million
- Total equity: ▼ A$1.09 billion (2020)
- Website: abacusgroup.com.au

Abacus Group is an Australian real estate investment trust. The company traded as Abacus Property Group until August 2023, when its self-storage business was separated into a separate listed entity, Abacus Storage King.

== History ==
Abacus was established in 1996 by Frank Wolf, an academic from the University of British Columbia, and listed on the Australian Securities Exchange in November 2002.

== Operations ==
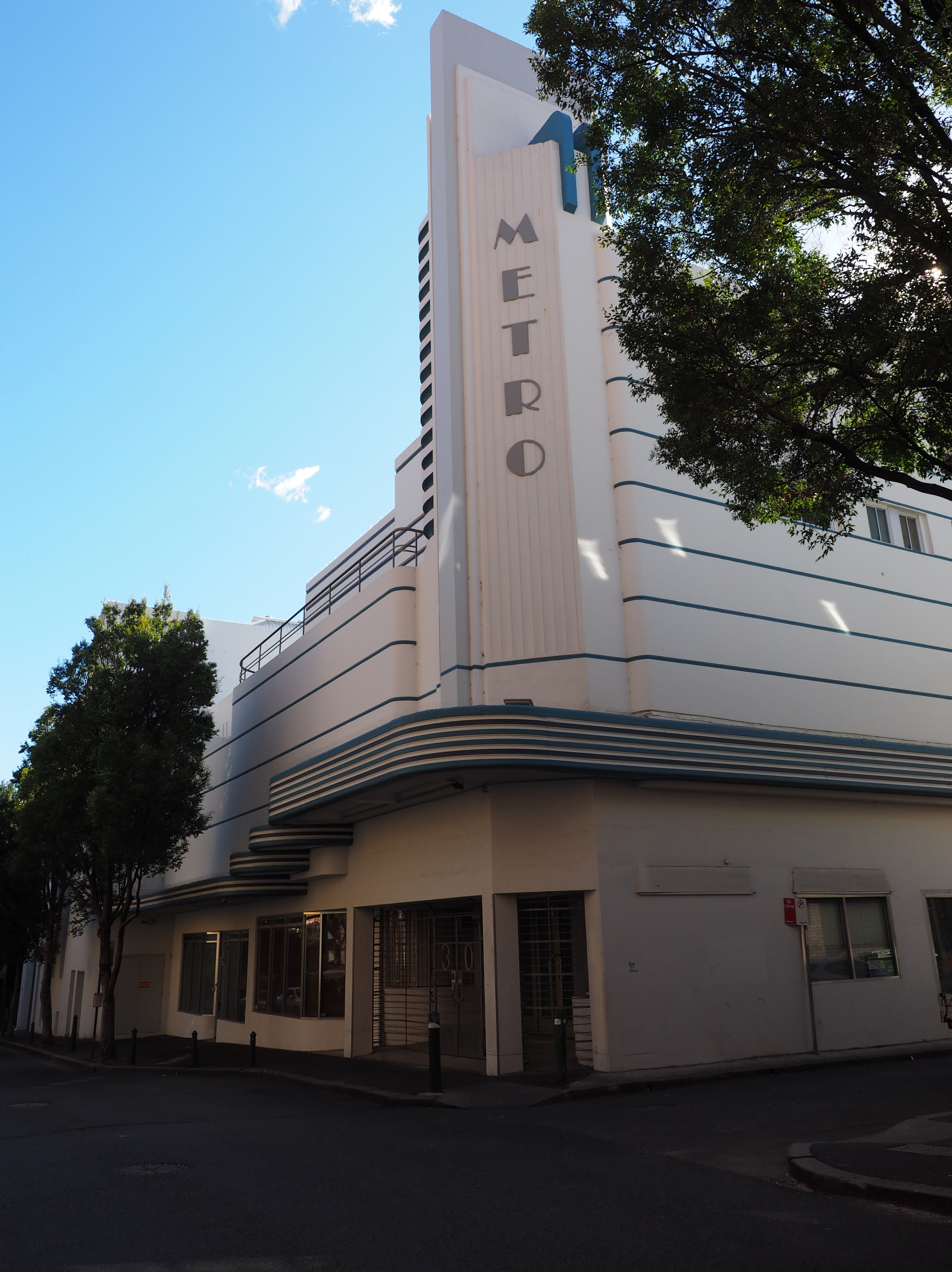
The Minerva Theatre building, formerly part of the company's Sydney portfolio

The company has a single corporate office in Sydney. Myra Salkinder chaired the group from September 2019 until her retirement from the board in June 2026. The managing director, Steven Sewell, was appointed in 2018 after leaving Vicinity Centres.

Before the 2023 restructure, the group's investment portfolio was divided into four divisions covering office, self-storage, retail and industrial property. Its holdings formerly included the late art-deco Minerva Theatre near Kings Cross in Sydney, which it sold in 2021.

The portfolio is concentrated in office towers, among them 201 Elizabeth Street in Sydney, the Brisbane Club and RAA Place in Adelaide. In an early transaction the group bought the heritage-listed CBC building at 343 George Street, Sydney for $55 million and sold it the following year for $78 million.

The group invests mainly in commercial property, including office towers. In the years before the 2023 restructure its growth was concentrated in self-storage, a sector supported by demand from Australia's e-commerce industry. In 2020 Abacus acquired the remaining shares in Storage King Pty Ltd for $50 million. In early 2021 it purchased four further self-storage facilities in Adelaide and Sydney, together with the remaining 60 per cent of the Oasis Centre in Queensland.

In 2019 the group began divesting its residential property holdings.
