= Art Collector (magazine) =

Australian quarterly art magazine

- Editor-in-Chief: Susan Borham
- Editorial Director: Robert Buratti
- Editor: Robert Buratti
- Categories: Visual arts of Australia, Indigenous art
- Frequency: Quarterly
- First issue: July–September 1997
- Country: Australia
- Based in: Sydney, New South Wales
- Language: English
- Website: www.artcollector.net.au
- ISSN: 1328-9586

Art Collector, previously known as Australian Art Collector, is a quarterly Australian art magazine that was first published in July 1997. The magazine primarily covers Australian contemporary and Indigenous Australian art, and also features artists from New Zealand and internationally. It is based in Sydney, New South Wales, Australia and is published in English. The magazine is known for its in-depth articles about artists, gallerists, and art collectors, as well as news of upcoming exhibitions in Australia and New Zealand. It is available in both print and online formats.

As of March 2025, the editor-in-chief is Susan Borham, with Robert Buratti serving as the editorial director and editor. Notable art collectors featured in the magazine include Simon Mordant, Corbett and Yueji Lyon, John Kaldor, Gene Sherman, and Colin and Elizabeth Laverty.

== History ==
Art Collector was launched in 1997 in Sydney, Australia. Shortly after its foundation the magazine was briefly in the news when text from one of its articles was used without acknowledgement by art critic Robert Hughes, when writing for Time magazine.

== Description ==
Art Collector is a quarterly art magazine, which features articles about artists, gallerists and art collectors; news of upcoming exhibitions in Australia and New Zealand, and issues affecting the art world. The magazine is available in print (sold in newsagents or by subscription) and online.

As of March 2022, the editor-in-chief is Susan Borham. Camilla Wagstaff is editorial director, while Rose of Sharon Leake is Editor.

== Features and publications ==
As of 2006 the magazine was best known for its annual features 50 Things Collectors Should Know, Art Under 5k, Undiscovered, and the Annual NATSIAA Roundup, which are referenced by other sources and collectors.

In issue 38, October–December 2006, the Queensland art critic Rex Butler profiled the work of Aboriginal artist Richard Bell.

In 2009, Art Collector published its first Guide to Indigenous Art Centres. In the same year it also published the Guide to Public & Regional Galleries and the Collector's Guidebook, a directory of services for art collectors. In 2019, Art Collector published a new edition of the Guide to Indigenous Art Centres, which featured stories on ethically sourcing Indigenous art and how to be certain of provenance.

Art collectors featured in the magazine have included Simon Mordant, Corbett and Yueji Lyon (whose collection is housed in the Lyon Housemuseum), John Kaldor, Gene Sherman and Colin and Elizabeth Laverty.
