= Narelle Autio =

Australian photographer (born 1969)

- Born: Narelle Autio; 1969 (age 56–57); Adelaide, South Australia
- Spouse: Trent Parke
- Awards: Walkley Awards (2000, 2002); Oskar Barnack Award (2002); World Press Photo award (2000, 2002)

Narelle Autio (born 1969) is an Australian photographer. She is a member of the In-Public street photography collective and is a founding member of the Oculi photographic agency. She is married to the photographer Trent Parke, with whom she often collaborates. She has won two Walkley Awards for photojournalism, two first prize World Press Photo awards, and the Oskar Barnack Award.

== Early life and education ==
Narelle Autio was born in 1969 in the Adelaide suburb of Henley Beach.

Autio attended art school at 17 years old after finishing her secondary education. Her first artist pursuits were painting and drawing, but during her first year of tertiary study she was exposed to photography as an artform. She completed a visual arts degree at the University of South Australia in 1990.

== Career ==
Autio began her career as a photojournalist at the Adelaide Advertiser in 1991, before leaving Adelaide in 1994. She travelled extensively in the UK and USA, and working for several major UK newspapers as well as being a photographer at News Limited's London bureau.

In 1998 she returned to Australia, residing in Sydney this time. She was a senior staff photographer at Sydney Morning Herald until 2003, with her work including the Sydney 2000 Olympics.

In 1999, Autio and then-partner (later husband) and fellow-photographer Trent Parke created the photographic series The Seventh Wave, comprising turbulent images of people the ocean, many underwater, mainly captured in black and white. The project took two years to complete, at locations including Bondi, Freshwater and Manly Beaches in Sydney, and up the coast to Bogey Hole at Newcastle, Port Macquarie, and Byron Bay.

This was followed in 2002 by the series Not of this Earth. Her solo show in 2004, Watercolours, continued her exploration of Australians at leisure. She followed this in 2010 with the show The Summer of Us, a document of what is left behind on the beach, naturally and by humankind.

In 2001 and 2006, Autio was selected in the Australian Art Collector magazine's "Australia's 50 Most Collectable Artists".

Autio joined the In-Public street photography collective in 2001. She is a founding member of Oculi, an independent, collective photographic agency. Her work is distributed by Agence Vu.

In 2018, Autio and Parke made, along with filmmaker Matthew Bate, an eight-channel video work called The Summation of Force. The work launched the 2018 Adelaide Film Festival, and a virtual reality version screened in the New Frontier Program at Sundance Film Festival in the US. The work was exhibited extensively in the US, Asia, and Europe, and won the inaugural VR Award at Imagine Film Festival in Amsterdam.

As of August 2024 is based in Adelaide.

== Publications ==
=== Books by Autio ===
- Place in Between: The Changelings. London: Stanley/Barker, 2020. ISBN 978-1-913288-14-3.

=== Books with contributions by Autio ===
- 10 – 10 Years of In-Public. London: Nick Turpin, 2010. ISBN 978-0-9563322-1-9.
- The Street Photographer's Manual. London: Thames & Hudson, 2014. ISBN 978-0-500-29130-6. By David Gibson. Includes a chapter on Autio.

== Films ==
- The Summation of Force – eight-channel film directed by Autio, Parke, and Matthew Bate in 2017

== Exhibitions ==
- 2002–2004: Dream/Life and The Seventh Wave (with Trent Parke). Canvas International Art Gallery, Amsterdam, 2002; FotoFreo Photographic Festival, Western Australian Maritime Museum, Fremantle, 2004; Ariel Meyerowitz Gallery, New York, 2004
- 2018: The Summation of Force, an eight-channel video work, premiered at Sundance Film Festival

== Recognition and awards ==
- 2000: Walkley Awards, Australia
- 2001: First prize, Nature stories category, World Press Photo Award 2000, with Trent Parke (for "Australian Roadkill" series)
- 2001: listed as one of the 50 most collected Australian artists by Art Collector magazine
- 2002: Walkley Awards, daily life category for "School of Dance", Australia
- 2002: First prize, Arts and Entertainment category, World Press Photo Award 2001
- 2002: Oskar Barnack Award for her series Coastal Dwellers (the only Australian thus far to win the award)
- 2001: again listed as one of the 50 most collected Australian artists by Art Collector magazine
- 2018: VR award at Imagine Film Festival in Amsterdam, for The Summation of Force
