= Lyons (architecture firm) =

Australian architecture firm since 1996

Lyons is an Australian architecture firm based in Melbourne, established in 1996. Lyons is known for large commercial and institutional buildings such as the RMIT Swanston Academic Building, Melbourne, the Australian Institute of Architects (Victoria), 41 Exhibition St, Melbourne, the John Curtin School of Medical Research in Canberra, the Central Institute of TAFE in Perth, the Queensland Children's Hospital in Brisbane, the School of Medicine and Menzies Research Institute in Hobart and the School of Medicine and Research in Sydney.

The firm was formed by brothers Corbett Lyon and Carey Lyon, later joined by third brother Cameron, Neil Appleton and Adrian Stanic; all remain as directors. The Lyons brothers are third generation Melbourne architects, grandsons of concrete pioneer and hotel designer Leslie M Perrott Snr, whose firm later became Perrott Lyon Mathieson. Their father was Ron Lyon, a director of the Perrott firm in the 1960s–90s, who married architectural delineator Marietta Perrott, daughter of Leslie M Perrott Snr. Les Perrott Jnr also worked in the firm, becoming director in the 1960s–80s, and their uncle Eric Lyons was also an architect.

== Projects ==
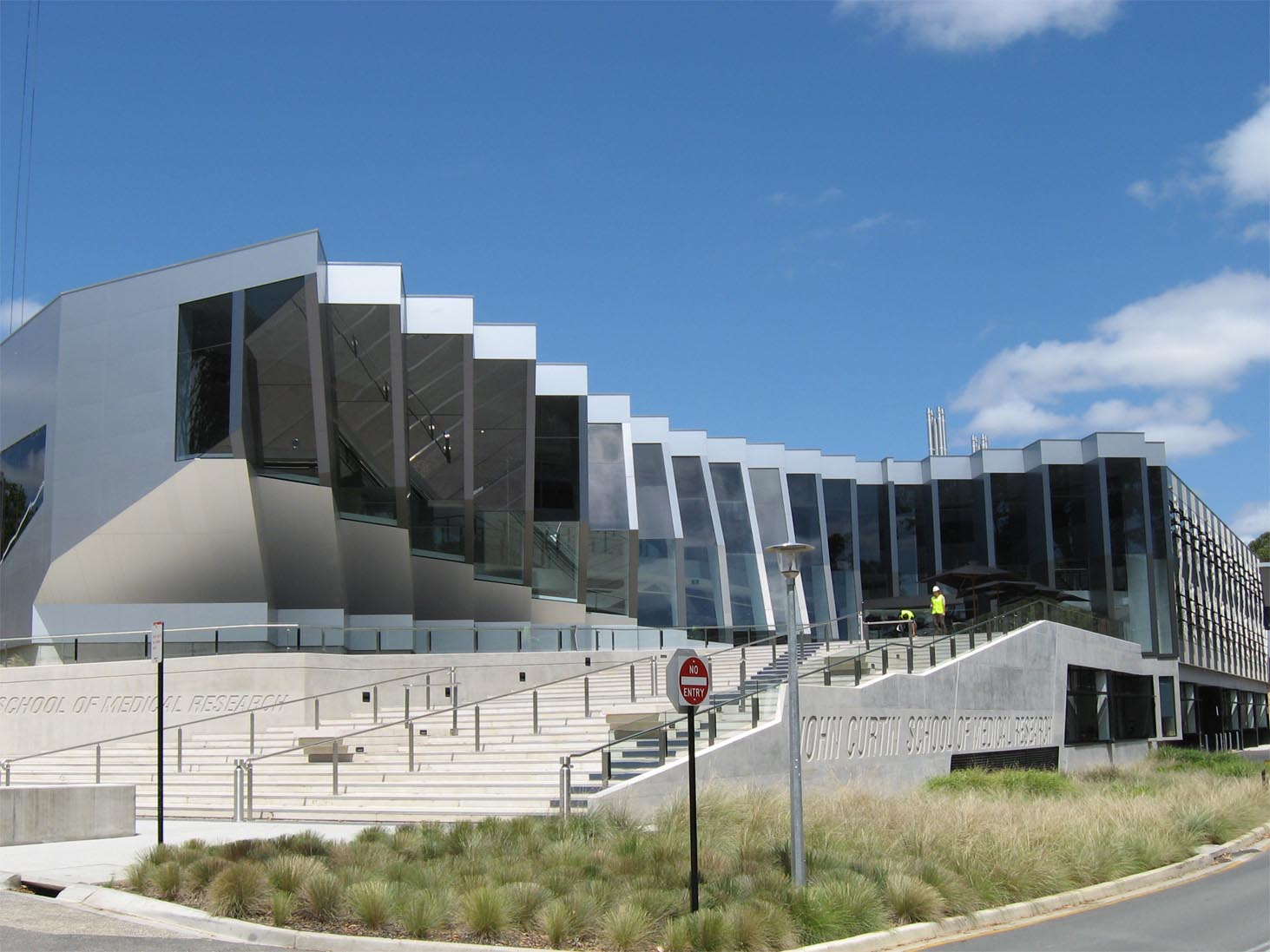
John Curtin School of Medical Research, Canberra

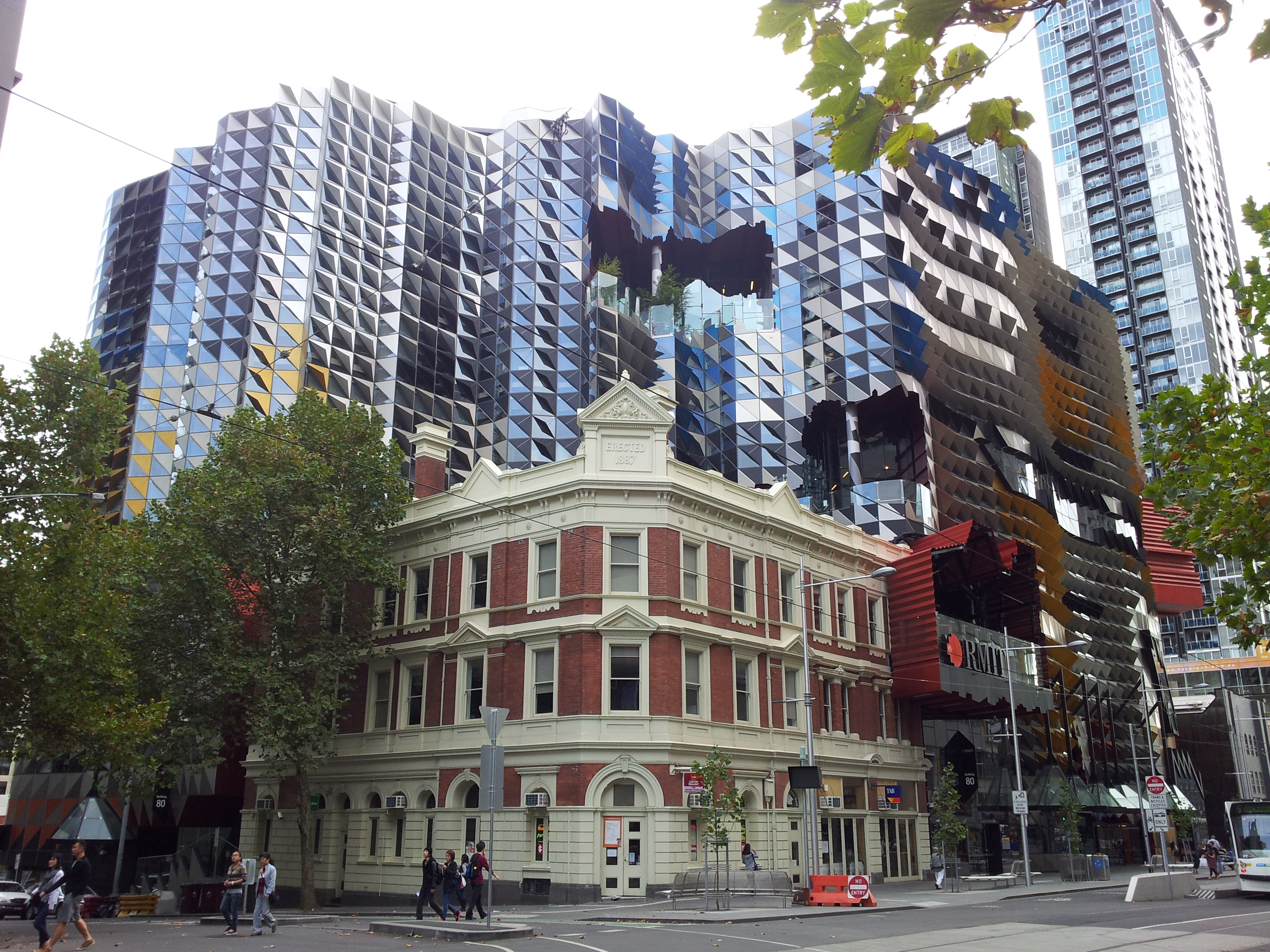
RMIT Swanston Academic Building

- New Queensland Children's Hospital, Brisbane,
- BHP Billiton Global Headquarters, Melbourne
- John Curtin School of Medical Research, Canberra
- Central Institute of TAFE, Perth
- Menzies Research Institute, Hobart
- Royal Hobart Hospital, Hobart
- UWS School of Medicine, Sydney
- Melbourne Brain Centre, Melbourne
- Lyon Housemuseum, Melbourne
- Kangan Institute, Automotive Centre of Excellence, Melbourne
- Headly Bull Centre, Australian National University, Canberra
- New School of Law at University of NSW, Sydney
- Victoria University Online Training Centre, St Albans (Victorian Architecture Medal Winner)
- Marine and Freshwater Research Institute, Queenscliff
- School of Medicine, Hobart
- Institute for Molecular Science, La Trobe University, Melbourne
- RMIT Swanston Academic Building, Melbourne
- Australian Institute of Architects, 41 Exhibition St, Melbourne
- ECU City, Perth
