= Independent Collectors =

Online community

Independent Collectors is an online community and editorial platform for contemporary art collectors. Founder Christian Kaspar Schwarm originally launched the site in June 2008. Independent Collectors is said to be the largest online resource of privately owned art and also offers a forum to discuss topics on collecting. Independent Collectors is based in Berlin, Germany. Die Zeit has described the site as a "Facebook for aesthetics".

== History ==
Christian Kaspar Schwarm originally came up with the idea based upon his own experiences of collecting contemporary artwork, noting that he was able to get to know gallery owners but not fellow collectors. He then teamed up with Ulrich Grothe and Uwe Thomas to found the website in 2008, to allow for easier communication between collectors. In 2009, the site entered into a partnership with automobile manufacturer BMW, as well as starting a content-based partnership with insurance company Allianz in 2014.

== Website ==
The Independent Collectors website offers a platform to showcase, share and discover contemporary art collections online. In December 2016, the website's collectors community counts more than 5,000 registered members in 97 countries. Members are required to adhere to the ethical code of Independent Collectors stating that they will not use the website for business related purposes. Each member application is individually verified, yet approved users can select to keep their identity anonymous.

Since 2008 Independent Collectors cooperates with various art fairs and institutions such as Art Basel, Frieze Art Fair, FIAC, The Armory Show and Frankfurter Allgemeine Forum conference, among others. Registered community members benefit from special offers such as VIP tickets, private tours and selected publications.

After a relaunch in early 2015, Independent Collectors complemented its closed community area with an open, publicly accessible editorial program on collecting. The website now incorporates a diverse program focused on online exhibitions and interviews, offering an insight into the culture of contemporary collecting.

== BMW Art Guide by Independent Collectors ==
In 2012, Independent Collectors and BMW created the BMW Art Guide by Independent Collectors, an Art Guide then featuring 173 private but publicly accessible collections of contemporary art from around the world. The first edition of the book was presented during Art Basel. Next to listing the visitor information and descriptions of the respective collections, the publication features short essays concerning contemporary aspects of collecting art.

In October 2016, the fourth extended version of the Art Guide was published by Hatje Cantz. The book was launched during Frieze Art Fair London and includes 256 private art collections from 43 countries "featuring large and small, famous and the relatively unknown".

The fourth BMW Art Guide by Independent Collectors is published in print and digitally as an eBook and is available in English and German. Featured collections include, among others: Museum of Old and New Art (MONA), White Rabbit – Contemporary Chinese Art Collection, Lyon Housemuseum, Maison Particulière, Vanhaerents Art Collection, Herbert Foundation, Verbeke Foundation, Inhotim – Instituto de Arte Contemporânea & Jardim Botânico, Rennie Collection at Wing Sang, M Woods, Collection Lambert, La Maison Rouge, Museum Frieder Burda, Sammlung Boros and Sammlung Hoffmann.

Since 2013, the publication is accompanied by theBMW Art Guide Blog. As a place for additional content, the blog focuses on collection visits, personal interviews with collectors from around the world and offers further background information and insights into art world related topics.

== Allianz Kunst Kolleg ==
In collaboration with Allianz Independent Collectors initiated the Kunst Kolleg in 2014. The Allianz Kunst Kolleg is a series of expert written articles that gather useful information for managing a collection. The topics discussed include art donation, conservation and transport, as well as art market related subjects such as art advisory, digitization and art flipping, among others.

All twelve articles are written by art journalists and compiled as a downloadable eReader. Published in 2016, the Allianz Kunst Kolleg is currently available in German.
