= Matthew Sleeth (visual artist) =

Australian artist

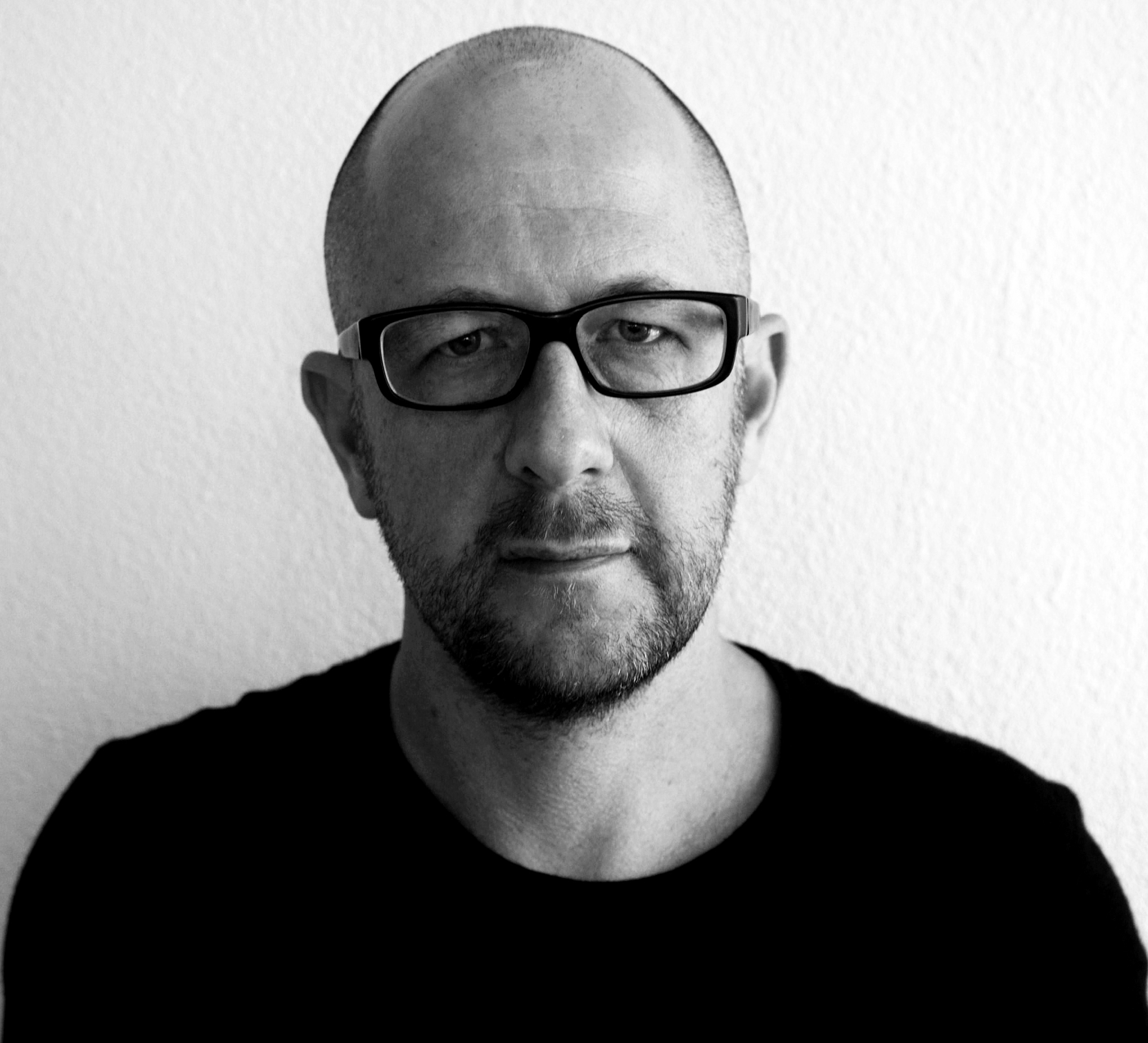
- Matt Sleeth in 2018
- Born: Matthew James Sleeth; 1972 (age 53–54)
- Education: Royal Melbourne Institute of Technology
- Occupations: Artist; Director; Screenwriter
- Years active: 1993 - present
- Style: experimental; contemporary art

Matthew Sleeth (born 1972) is an Australian visual artist and filmmaker. His often collaborative practice incorporates photography, film, sculpture and installation with a particular focus on the aesthetic and conceptual concerns of new media. The performative and photographic nature of media art is regularly highlighted in his work.

== Early life ==
Sleeth was born in 1972 and grew up in Melbourne. His father was a keen amateur photographer who taught him to make photographs in the darkroom from an early age.

== Career ==
Matthew Sleeth's early career is defined through three photographic monographs. Roaring Days, is the only one showing his work with black & white photography, played with nostalgia and politics. The Bank Book is a response to the making of a feature film. Tour of Duty, explores the performance/performative aspect of armed conflict as seen during the 1999 East Timorese crisis.

In 2001, he was named one of the 30 most influential artists under 30 in PDN Magazine.

In 2005/6 Sleeth lived in Tokyo as part of the Australia Council’s studio residency program. Then, in 2007, he was featured on the cover of Australian Art Collector magazine.

Following the publication of Opfikon in 2004, Sleeth's practice became more conceptually driven. His work expanded from photography and video to include sculpture, print-making and installation. Pattern Recognition, an exhibition of public billboards for the 2008 Melbourne International Arts Festival, was described as exploring "ideas about photography itself and the way it has historically been used to order and categorise life". The Aperture Foundation's Exposures Blog described his New York solo exhibition, Various Positions (parts 1 through 6), as "working toward a new photographic aesthetic". It opened at Claire Oliver Gallery in Chelsea, Manhattan on 18 March 2009.

Sleeth has consistently embraced new technologies and methods of production, working with 3D printing, aerial drones, electronics and computer programming.

His work with 3D printing and CNC fabrication led to Sleeth's sculptural installation, The Rise and Fall of Western Civilization (And Other Obvious Metaphors). This concrete freeway combined photography, metal, plywood and micro-computers with LED displays.

As his film practice evolved, Sleeth's interest in performance became more apparent, particularly in video works such as I Don't See God Up Here and Kerobokan Portraits [Andrew and Myuran].

In 2015 Sleeth co-wrote and directed A Drone Opera. Presented by Arts House and Experimenta, the live performance combined opera singers, laser set-design and purpose-built drones to bring together the sense of surveillance and menace that explores our relationship with new technologies. In June 2019, a cinematic version of A Drone Opera was screened at the Sydney Film Festival and a three-channel film installation was presented at Carriageworks, Sydney.

Sleeth's work with Myuran Sukumaran at Kerobokan Prison and the campaign to save Sukumaran and Andrew Chan from execution, fuelled the development of 2017's Guilty. In his feature film debut, Sleeth highlighted the final 72 hours of Sukumaran's life and questions the use of execution as a means of punishment. Guilty premiered at the Adelaide Film Festival on 8 October 2017 and was released by Madman Entertainment on DVD in April 2020.

== Filmography ==
=== Films ===
Year	Film	Credited as				Awards
Year	Film	Director	Writer	Producer	Cinematographer	Awards
2017	Guilty	Yes	Yes	No	Additional cinematography	Australian Cinematographers Society, Gold award, Winner, 2019 Dili Film Festival Award, Winner, 2019 Australian Directors Guild, Nomination, 2019 ATOM Award, Winner, 2018 Australian Cinematographers Society, Gold award, Winner, 2020

=== Short films ===
Year	Film	Credited as			
Year	Film	Director	Producer	Writer	Cinematographer
2019	A Drone Opera	Yes	Yes	Yes	Additional cinematography
2013	For One Reason Or Another	Yes	Yes	Yes	Yes
2013	Kerobokan Portraits	Yes	Yes	No	Yes
2010	Bali	Yes	Yes	No	Yes
2010	I Don't See God Up Here	Yes	Yes	No	Yes
2009	Green Shoots	Yes	Yes	No	Yes

=== Film festivals ===
- Guilty, Adelaide Film Festival, premiere, 2017
- Guilty, Human Rights Film Festival, 2018
- Guilty, Dili International Film Festival, 2018
- A Drone Opera, Sydney Film Festival, premiere, 2019

== Live performance ==
- A Drone Opera (Director, Writer, Performer) - commissioned by Experimenta Media Arts and presented by Arts House at Meat Market, Melbourne, September 2015.
- Prize Fighter (Performer) - presented by La Boite Theatre and Melbourne International Arts Festival, October 2018.

== Monographs ==
- Roaring Days (M.33, Melbourne, 1998)
- Tour of Duty (Hardie Grant Books, Melbourne, 2002)
- home + away (M.33, Melbourne, 2003)
- Survey (Josef Lebovic Gallery, Sydney, 2004)
- Opfikon (M.33, Melbourne, 2004)
- Ten Series/106 Photographs (Aperture Foundation, New York, 2007)

== Collections ==
Sleeth's work is held in the following public collections:

- Artbank
- Australia Council for the Arts
- Australian War Memorial
- Brandts Museet for Fotokunst
- Campbelltown Arts Centre
- La Trobe University Art Museum
- Monash Gallery of Art
- Monash University Museum of Art
- Museum of Photographic Arts
- Lyon Housemuseum
- National Gallery of Australia
- National Gallery of Victoria
- National Portrait Gallery (Australia)
- Town Hall Gallery

== Solo exhibitions ==
- Short Stories, Centre for Contemporary Photography, Melbourne 1996
- Boys, Prostitutes Collective of Victoria, Melbourne 1997
- Silvers Circus, Leica Gallery, Solms, Germany 1998
- Roaring Days, Stills Gallery, Sydney 1998
- Roaring Days, Photographers’ Gallery, Melbourne 1998
- Roaring Days, Saba Gallery, New York 2000
- Tour of Duty, Boccalero Gallery, Los Angeles 2001
- Roaring Days, Leica Gallery, Tokyo 2001
- Tour Of Duty, Centre for Contemporary Photography, Melbourne 2002
- Feet, Citylights, Melbourne 2003
- Survey, Josef Lebovic Gallery at The Depot, Sydney 2004
- Tour Of Duty, Galerie Lichtblick, Cologne 2004
- Red China, Centre for Contemporary Photography, Melbourne 2005
- Rosebud, Fremantle Prison, Fotofreo Festival, Fremantle, Western Australia 2006
- Pictured, Monash Gallery of Art, Melbourne 2006
- Call Of The Wild, Fyrtøjet, Odense Photo Triennial, Denmark. 2006
- 12 Views of Mount Fuji, Jan Manton Art, Brisbane 2007
- Mixed Tape, Sophie Gannon Gallery, Melbourne 2007
- Ten Series, Australian Centre for Photography, Sydney 2007
- Ten Series, Aperture Gallery, New York 2008
- Matthew Sleeth, Claire Oliver Gallery, Next 08 @ Art Chicago, USA 2008
- Pattern Recognition, Sophie Gannon Gallery & multiple site specific public installations Melbourne International Arts Festival, Melbourne 2008
- Various Positions Parts 1-6, Claire Oliver Gallery, New York 2009
- The Rise and Fall of Western Civilization (And Other Obvious Metaphors), Claire Oliver Gallery, New York 2011
- The Generative Freeway Project, Tin Sheds Gallery, Sydney, (ISEA) 2013
- The Last Carpark, WestSpace, Melbourne (Liquid Architecture Festival of Sound Art) 2013
- Representation and Reproduction: a love story, Royal Melbourne Institute of Technology, 2014
- Intentionally Left Blank, Trocadero Art Space, Melbourne 2014
- Magnificent Obsessions, Claire Oliver Gallery, New York 2015
- Rules to Live By, Claire Oliver Gallery, New York 2016
- The End, Gertrude Contemporary, Melbourne 2017
- It Was All A Dream, Pulse, Miami 2017
- Rosebud, Town Hall Gallery, Melbourne 2018
- A Drone Opera, Carriageworks, Sydney 2019
- A Drone Opera, Lyon Housemuseum, Melbourne 2020
- A Drone Opera, Ars Electronica, Austria 2020
