= Swanston Academic Building =

- RMIT Building 80
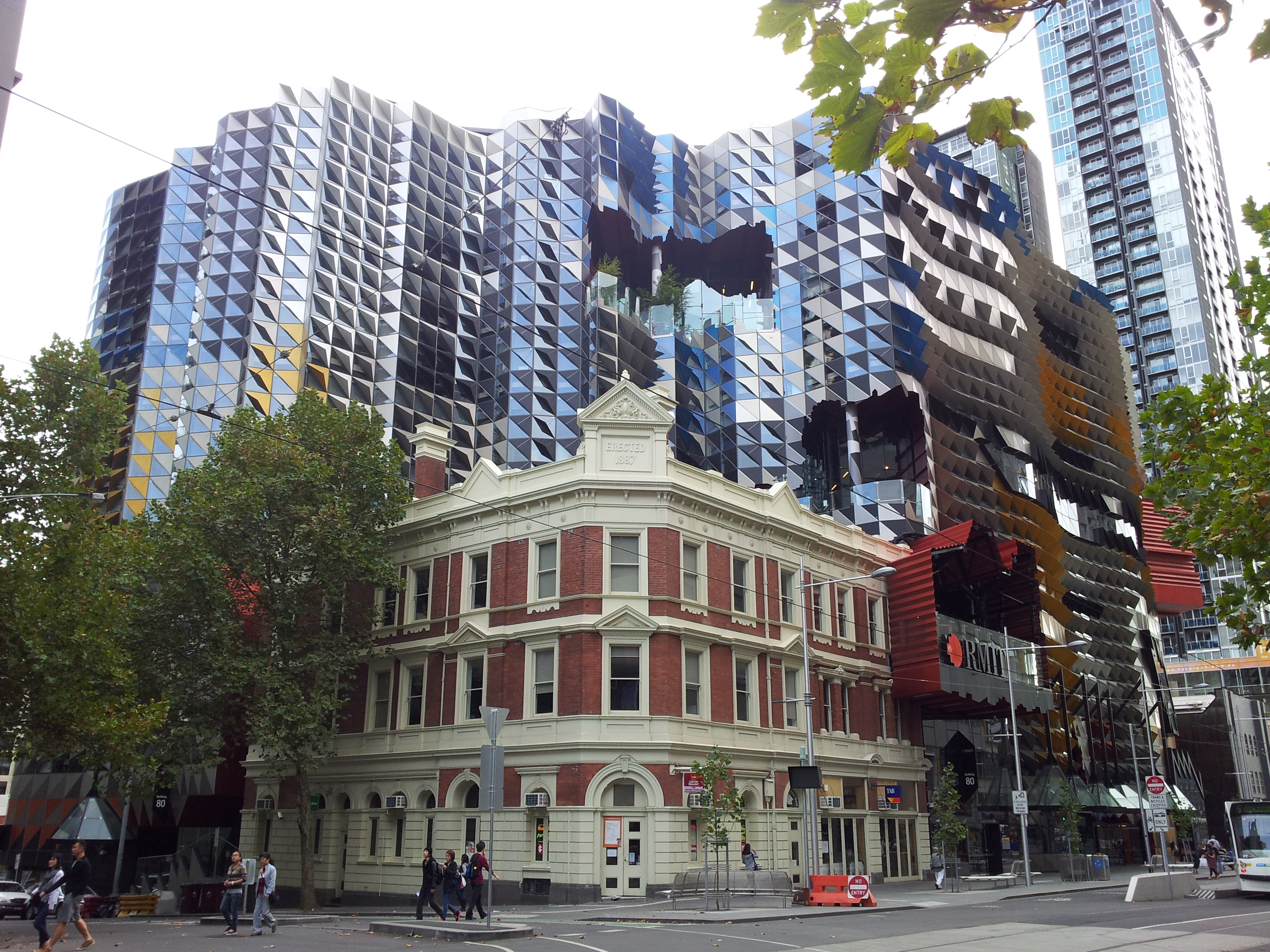
- SAB on Swanston Street, with RMIT Building 81 (The Oxford Scholar Pub) in the foreground

General information
- Type: Education
- Architectural style: Postmodern
- Location: 445 Swanston Street, Melbourne, Victoria, Australia
- Coordinates: 37.808193°S 144.962955°E
- Completed: 2012
- Cost: $200 million
- Owner: RMIT

Technical details
- Floor count: 11
- Floor area: 35,000 square metres (380,000 sq ft)
- Lifts/elevators: 8

Design and construction
- Architecture firm: Lyons Architects
- Main contractor: Multiplex

The Swanston Academic building is an RMIT building designed by the architecture firm Lyons and is located on Swanston Street in Melbourne across from Peter Corrigan designed building 8 and ARM's Storey Hall. Construction began in September 2010 and was completed in September 2012. The budget for the SAB was $200,000,000. The new building contains 35,000 square metres (380,000 sq ft) of floor space, is 11 storeys high (including basement) and provides 6 large lecture theatres for students. The colourful building is intended to reflect the cities surroundings in the façade. “The idea is to wear the ‘cloak’ of the city”. (Carey Lyon)

== History ==
Before the SAB building was built, there was another proposal for a sports and recreation center that was to occupy the site. This new building would also be designed by Lyons Architects and would provide a large sports hall and allied facilities, including a gymnasium, change-rooms and health consulting suites. The hall would have had three indoor sports courts for daily use (adaptable for volleyball, badminton, netball and basketball) and is also intended to be a venue for elite sporting competitions, university ceremonies and student examinations. The building was to accommodate for 2600 people. The building was a tube that followed the gentle fall of the land.

The building's interior was intended to be seen from the street as a public spectacle, which would reveal the university. The glass façade was to be sand blasted and seraphic printed to achieve patterning. The building was to be a contained public space.

The current SAB by Lyons architects’ eventually replaced this design.

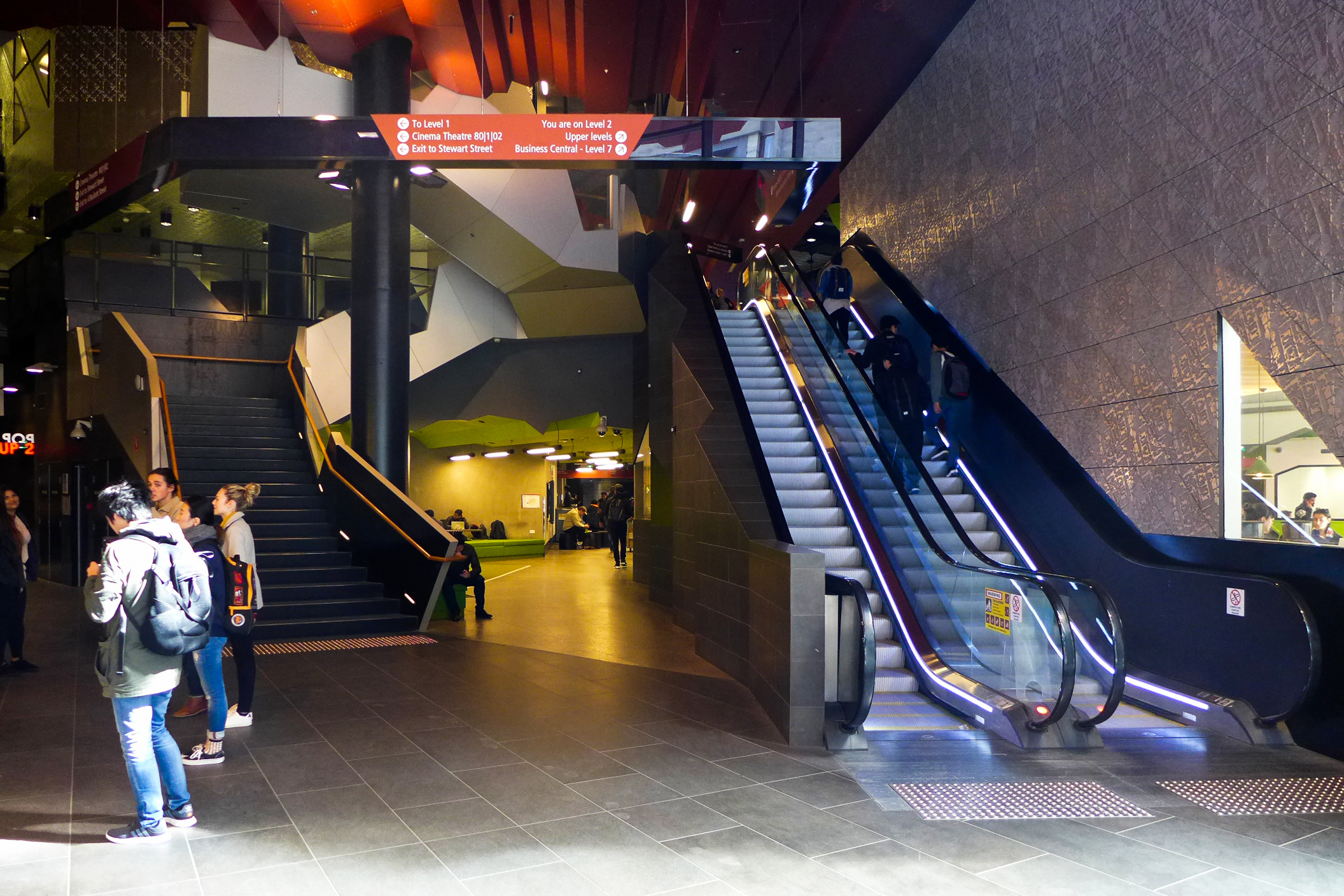
Building Entrance

== Features ==
- 6 large lecture theatres available that are available to the whole University community
- 8 Coloured Anodised Finishes by Sapphire Aluminium
- 70 small and medium-sized teaching and learning spaces that are available to the whole University community
- 9 specialist learning venues that are available to the whole University community
- Two-storey cantilevered student portal that overhangs Swanston Street
- Nine additional double-height student portals for study and recreation
- An innovative mix of teaching and office space on all levels of the building to encourage more interaction between staff and students
- Eleven retail outlets that include coffee carts, cafes and a restaurant.

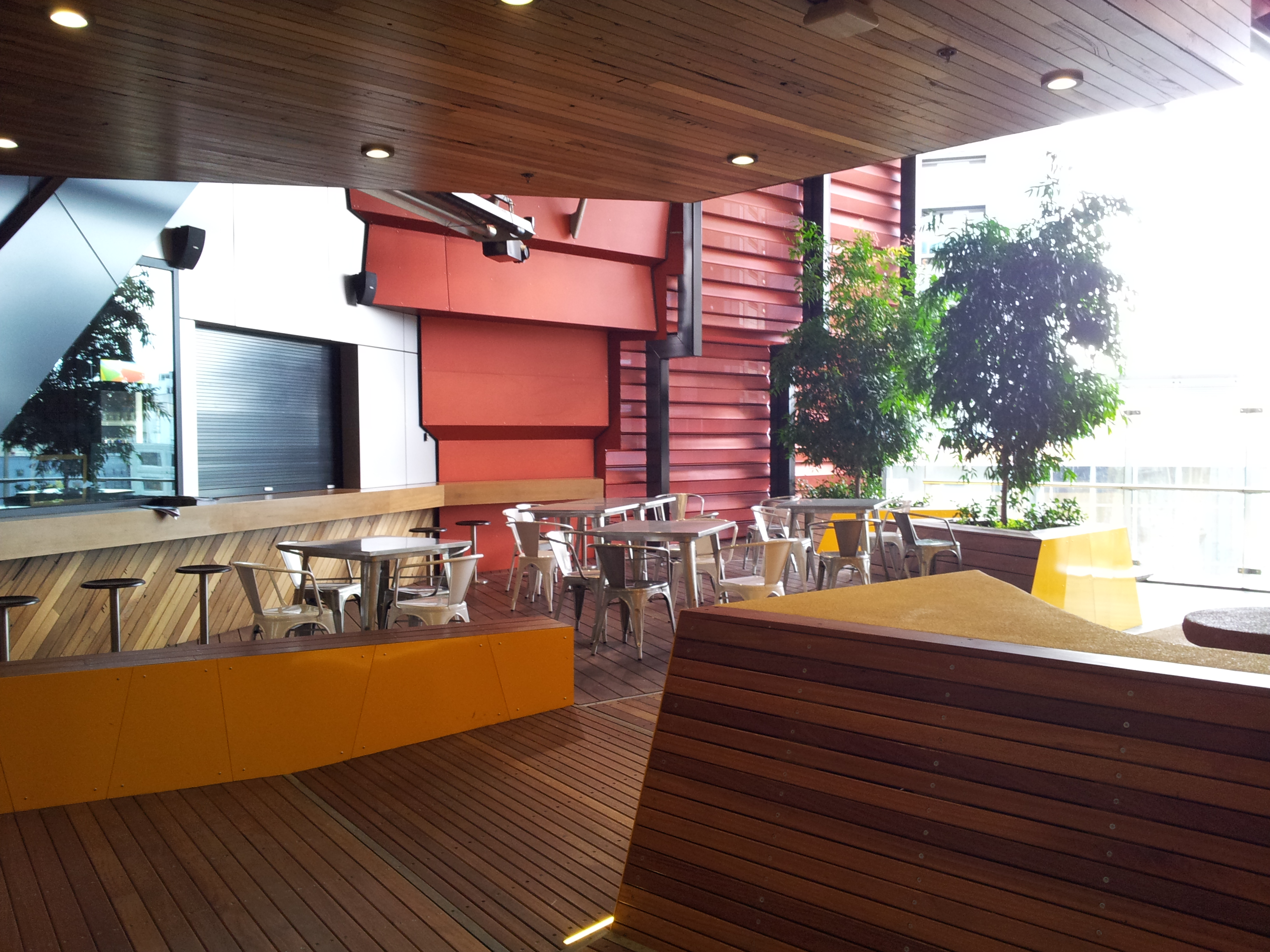
Portal Cafe

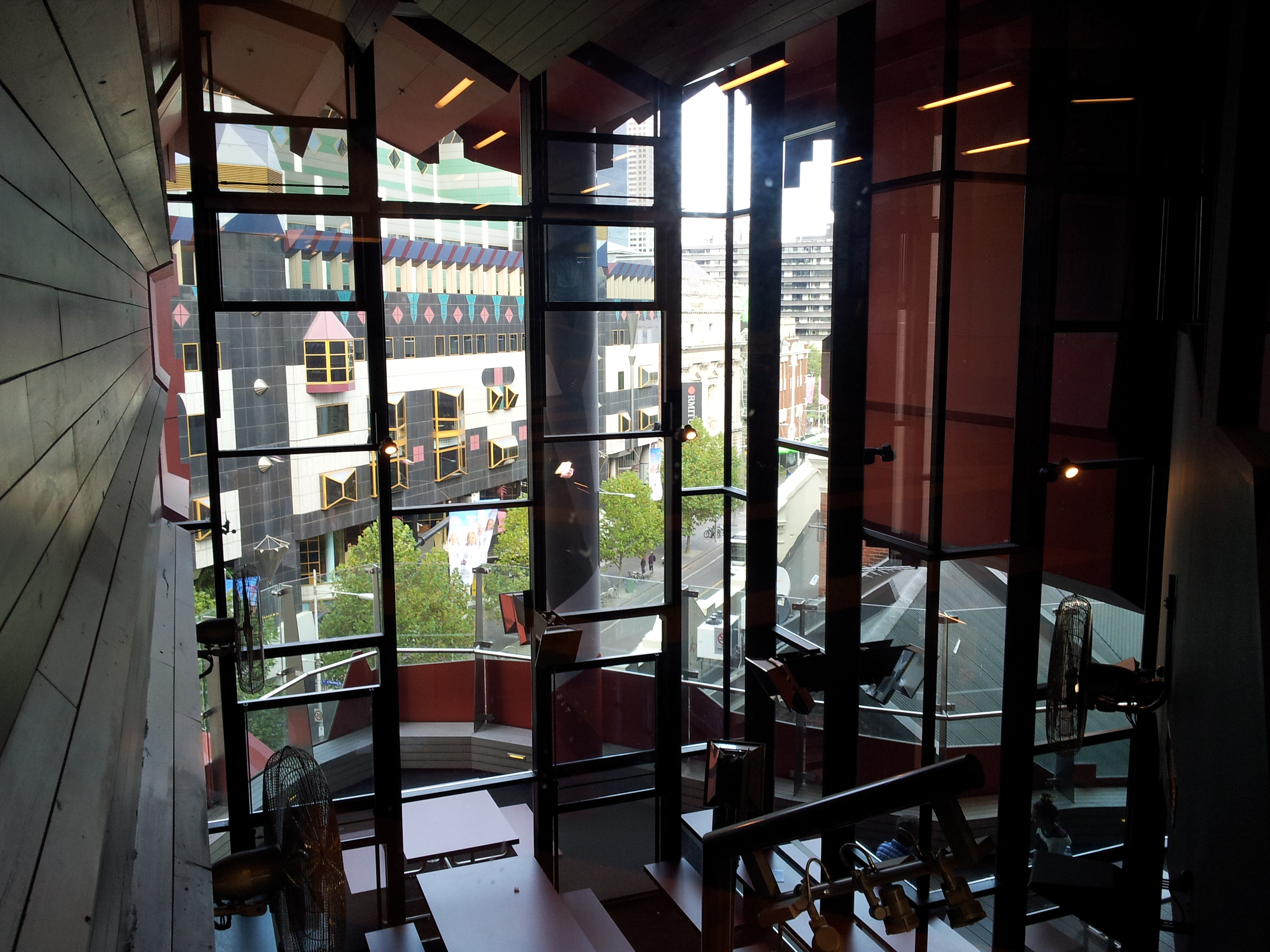
Portal Study Space

== Environmentally Sustainable Design ==
The SAB has achieved a 5 star Green star rating. Featuring a water harvesting system, water from the rooftop is collected and used for the flushing of the toilets. Horizontal atriums allow no natural light to filter through the building, reducing the need for electrical lighting. Other ESD features include:

- Active chilled beam technology.
- Under Floor Air Distribution System (UFAD) that is used for ventilation and cooling in lecture theatres
- Student portal heating and cooling that uses mixed mode ventilation. When the external temperature is between 17 and 30 °C (63 and 86 °F) and the wind speed is less than 10 metres per second (33 ft/s), the Swanston Academic Building portals will operate in natural ventilation mode, opening the vents and windows to outside conditions.
- Façade is composed of external panels and triangular elements, which provide different degrees of shading, based on the orientation of the building.
- The combination of shading elements and glazing performance allows for high levels of natural daylight to penetrate the internal spaces of the Swanston Academic Building, without allowing for significant glare.
- Rainwater harvesting and grey water treatment. To reduce the consumption of drinking (potable) water, rainwater is collected from the roof of the building in an 80 kL rainwater tank and is used for irrigation and toilet flushing.
- Energy-efficient lighting sources that include fluorescent lamps and LEDs. These lamps offer a significant reduction in lighting power consumption: approximately one third of that consumed by incandescent lamps.
- Constructed from materials that have a reduced environmental impact. These materials include those with a lower embodied energy, those that originate from sustainable sources and those that use reduced amounts of raw materials.
- Chilled water is sourced from a chilled water plant room that is located on the roof of RMIT's Building 12, opposite Building 80 on Swanston Street on the City Campus.
- The Building Management System is connected to energy and water meters and allows for real-time monitoring of water, electricity, and gas consumption
- Demand-based Control Ventilation technology, which maintains proper ventilation and improves air quality while saving energy. Carbon Dioxide Gas sensors control the amount of ventilation for the actual number of occupants.
- Solar-powered hot water capacity. The solar panels are used to pre-heat the water, which is then stored in tanks until required.

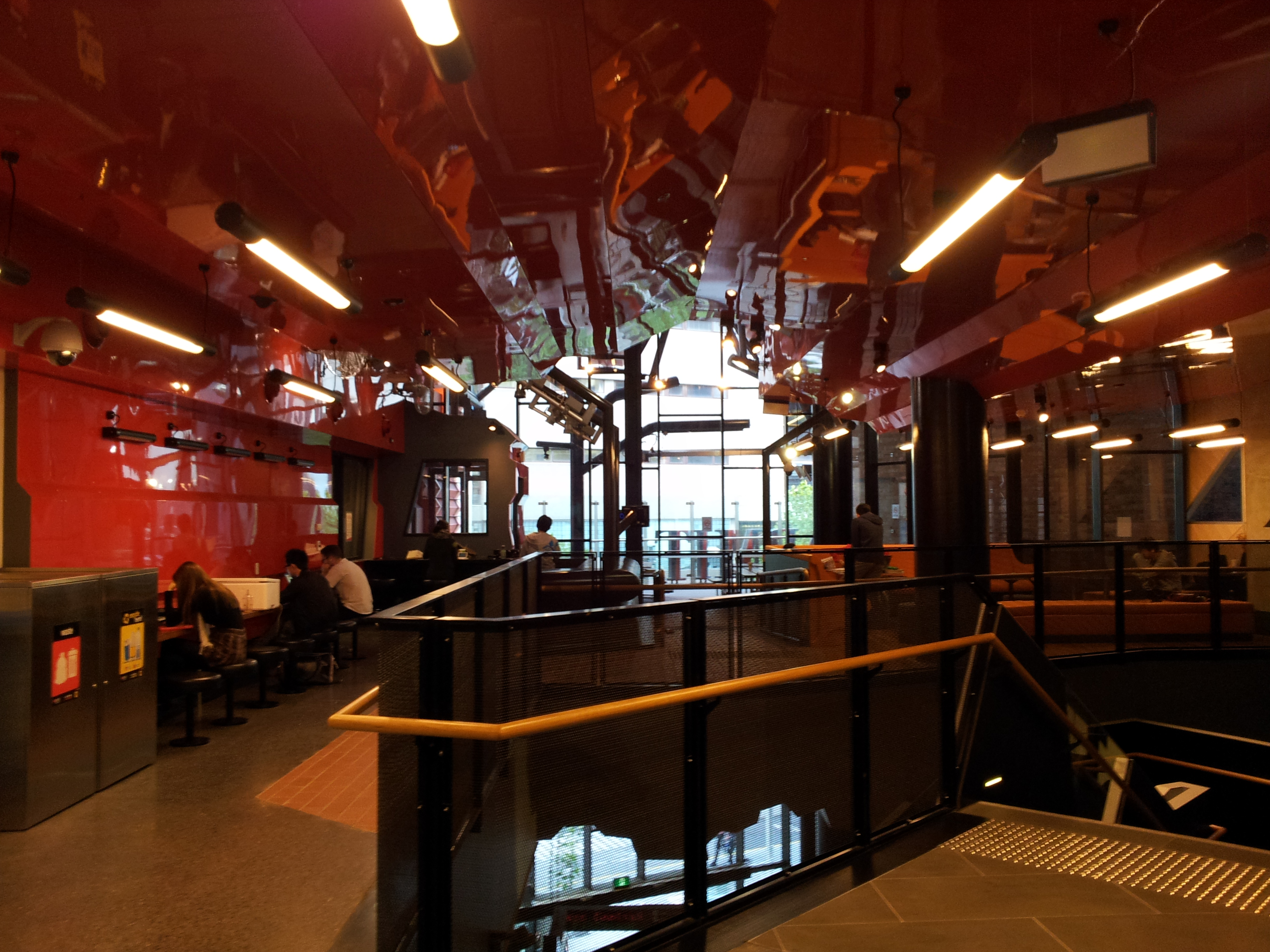
Interior Portal

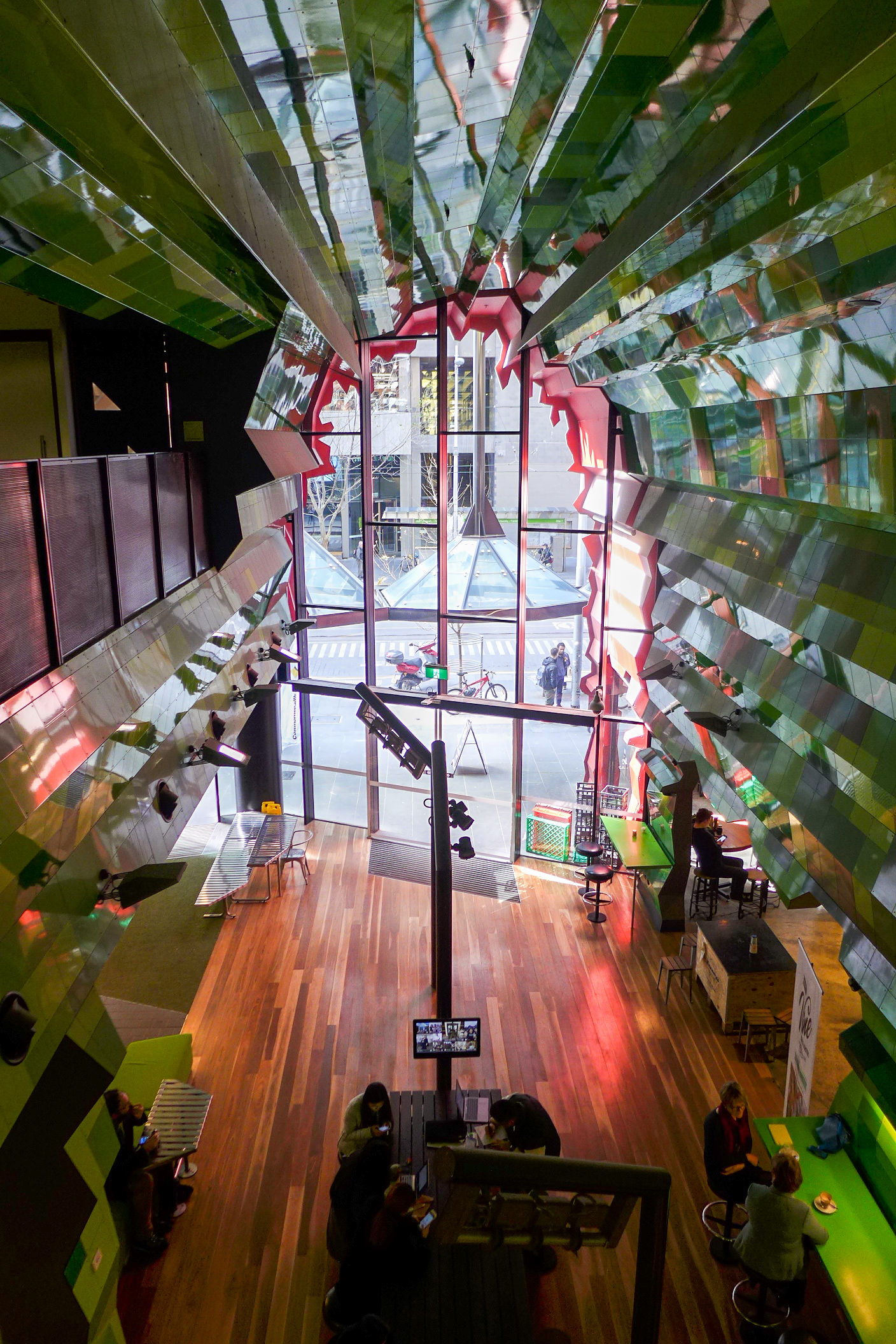
Interior Portal

== Design approach ==
The defining element for Lyons design for the Swanston Academic Building was its central site to Melbourne's CBD, which influenced its footprint and form. Adrian Stanic (Lyons Architectural Director and RMIT alumnus) said in a media release (22/10/2010) “We saw the site as a focal point of the city and looked at how the SAB could create a dialogue with the other landmark buildings that define Melbourne. The process involved mapping lines from the site to these buildings. Using these lines we then created a computerized algorithm that generated the three-dimensional shapes and form of the building. We also put a boom lift on site and hoisted architectural photographer Dianna Snape up to photographically capture the vistas from the 11 levels of the building. The best viewpoints then became the location for the student ‘portals’ on each level that connect student activities inside the building with the surrounding cityscape. In this way we have created a design that integrates the building into the very heart of Melbourne architecturally, but also reflects and embraces the broader architectural legacy of the city.” Predominant colours of Melbourne were derived from a survey, which has been reflected in the colour palette of the SAB. Lyons has connected the Swanston Academic Building to the rest of the RMIT campus by designing it with “a sense of openness, transparency and energy". When designing the layout for the Swanston Academic Building, Lyons consulted extensively with a wide range of academic staff to gather information about learning and teaching methodologies (both current and future), including learning and teaching spaces that would aid their teaching practice.
