= Telstra Corporate Centre =

Office skyscraper in Melbourne, Australia

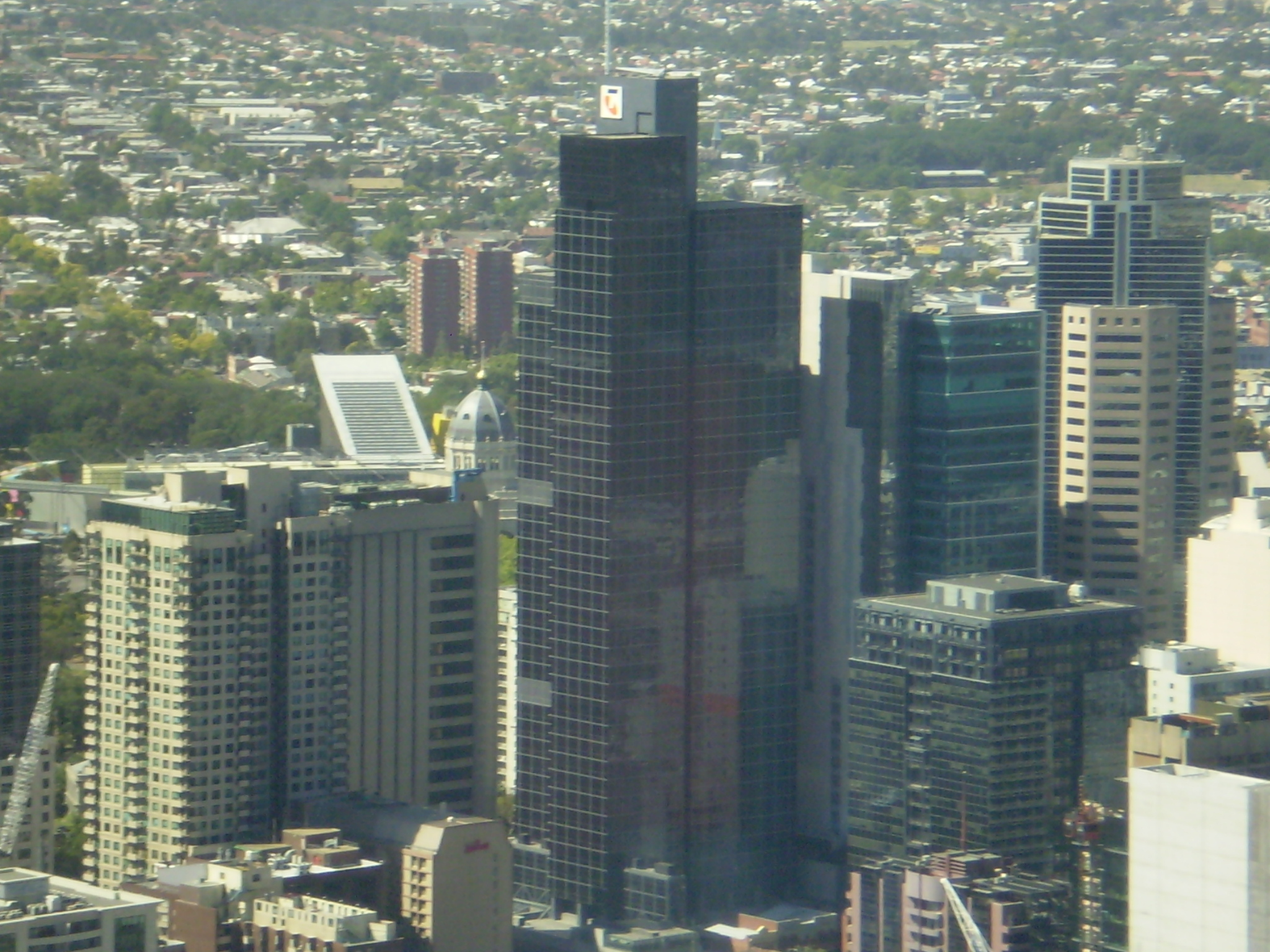
- Interactive map of the Telstra Corporate Centre area

General information
- Status: Completed
- Type: Office
- Location: Melbourne, Australia
- Coordinates: 37.809944°S 144.969788°E
- Completed: 1992

Height
- Antenna spire: 218 m (715 ft)
- Roof: 193 m (633 ft)

Technical details
- Floor count: 47

Design and construction
- Architect: Perrott Lyon Mathieson

Telstra Corporate Centre is an office skyscraper in Melbourne, Australia. Standing 218 m high with 47 floors (43 used as offices), it is the equal 21st tallest in Melbourne as of 2024. It is located at 242 Exhibition Street. It is the world headquarters for Telstra and includes a small retail precinct located on the ground floor towards the Little Lonsdale Street side.

The building was designed by the large commercial architects Perrott Lyon Mathieson. It was opened in 1992 and the building was fully refurbished in 2010 by Telstra's General Manager of Infrastructure Ross Lambi and team in partnership with Lendlease to include a Telstra store, two new cafes, two 15m square HD media walls as well as the food court area according to spokeswoman Sally Steer. The new reception area features Australia's largest indoor vertical live garden.

List of tallest buildings in Australia
Next Shortest 108 St Georges Terrace; 214m	Next Tallest Aurora Tower; 219m
Heights are to highest architectural element.

List of tallest buildings in Melbourne
Next Shortest Freshwater Place; 205m	Next Tallest Melbourne Central; 246m
Heights are to highest architectural element.
