= Princes Gate Towers =

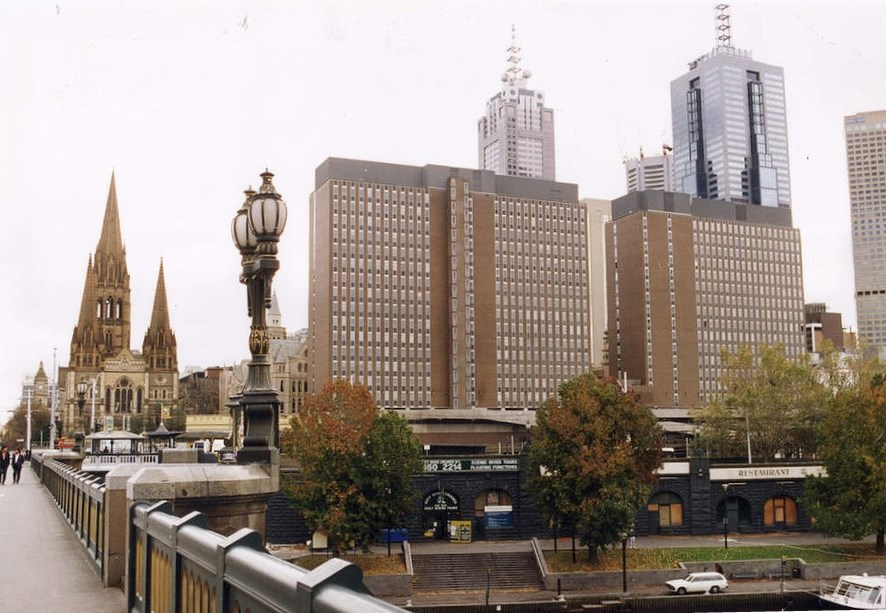
- Alternative names: Gas & Fuel Towers

General information
- Status: Demolished
- Type: Office building
- Location: 171 Flinders Street, Melbourne
- Opened: 1966
- Demolished: 1997

Height
- Height: 70 m (230 ft)

Design and construction
- Architecture firm: Leslie M Perrott & Partners
- Developer: Lend Lease; Oddenino's Property & Investment Co

Other information
- Parking: 186

The Princes Gate Towers were a set of twin office tower blocks, located at the intersection of Flinders and Swanston Streets in the Melbourne central business district, Australia. They were designed by architects Leslie M. Perrott and Partners and completed in 1967. They were partly occupied by the Gas and Fuel Corporation of Victoria, leading to them also being known as "the Gas & Fuel Buildings". They were demolished in 1997 to make way for Federation Square, the mixed-use development and public space that now occupies the site.

== Background ==
The Jolimont Railway Yards, that occupied the southern edge of the Hoddle grid, were considered for redevelopment many times throughout the early to mid 20th century. In 1963, Victorian premier Henry Bolte announced that the State Government was to sell the air-rights over a small portion of the railyards closest to Flinders Street, up to Swanston Street, which was occupied by the Princes Bridge railway station. The £5 million project would feature two 15-storey office blocks, along with a public plaza and a new entrance to the station. The new development would become the "gateway" to the city, and was to be known as Princes Gate.

Leslie Perrot and Partners were chosen as project architects and the development was funded by Princes Gate Pty Ltd, jointly owned by Lend Lease and Oddenino's Property and Investment Co of London. Construction was completed in 1967. The Victorian Employees Federation leased 12 floors in the East tower, while the Gas and Fuel Corporation leased 10 floors in the West tower. The buildings housed a total of 25,000 m^{2} (270,000 sq ft) of office space, split level parking for 186 cars, and 1,700 m^{2} (18,000 sq ft) of retail space on the ground level.

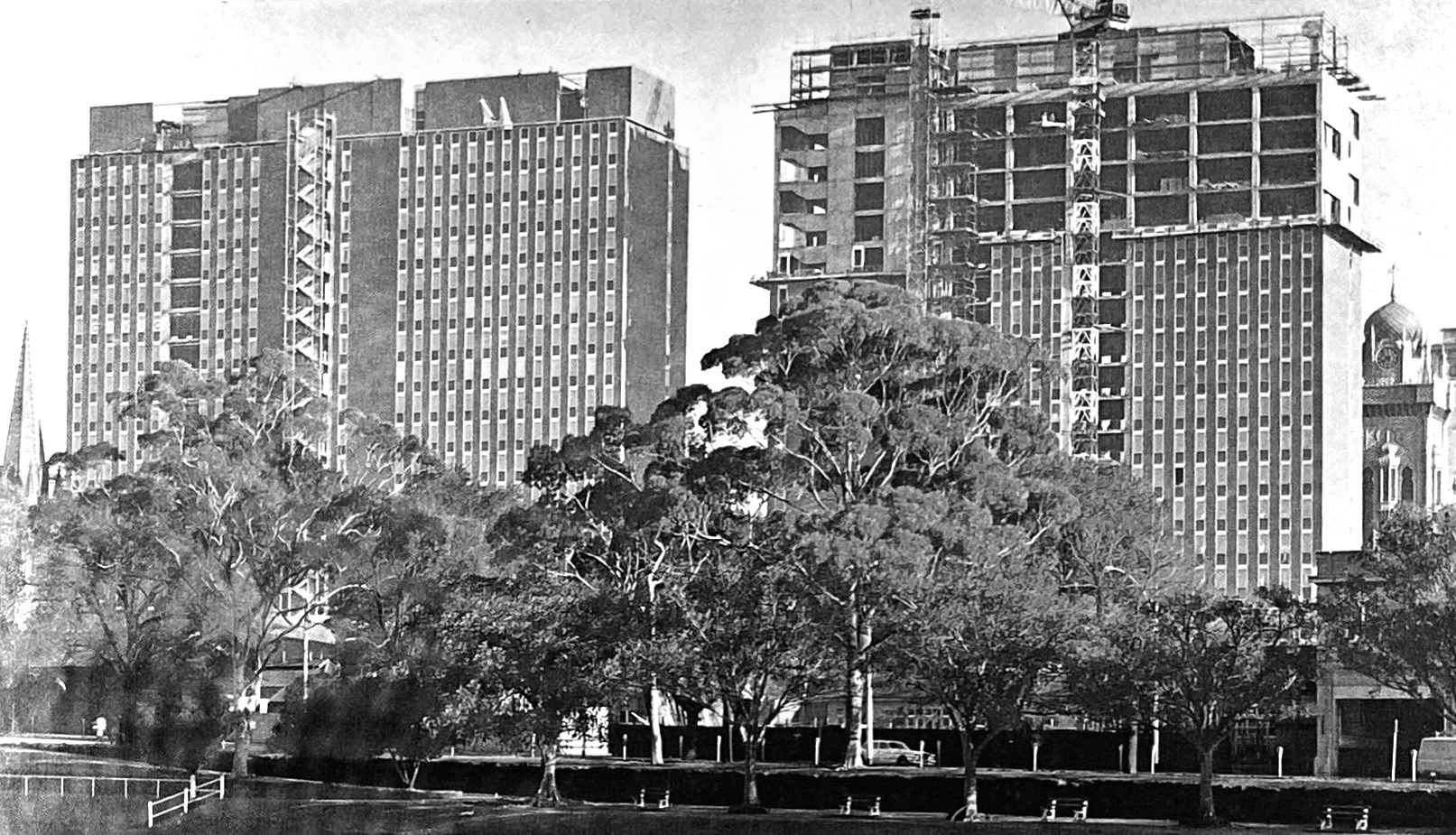
The towers nearing completion, 1966

== Architecture ==
The towers were designed in the postwar corporate International Style, by Leslie M Perrott & Associates. The lead architect on the project was David Simpson, developing the complex design for a large three storey podium containing car parking, with retail spaces that faced onto Flinders Street, and a new access to the station platforms. The development also featured a raised public plaza that occupied the important Flinders/Swanston intersection corner, designed to allow an open vista to St Paul's Cathedral and also function as a public square that was raised up from the noise and traffic of the streets below, which Simpson later felt was not the most successful part of the design.

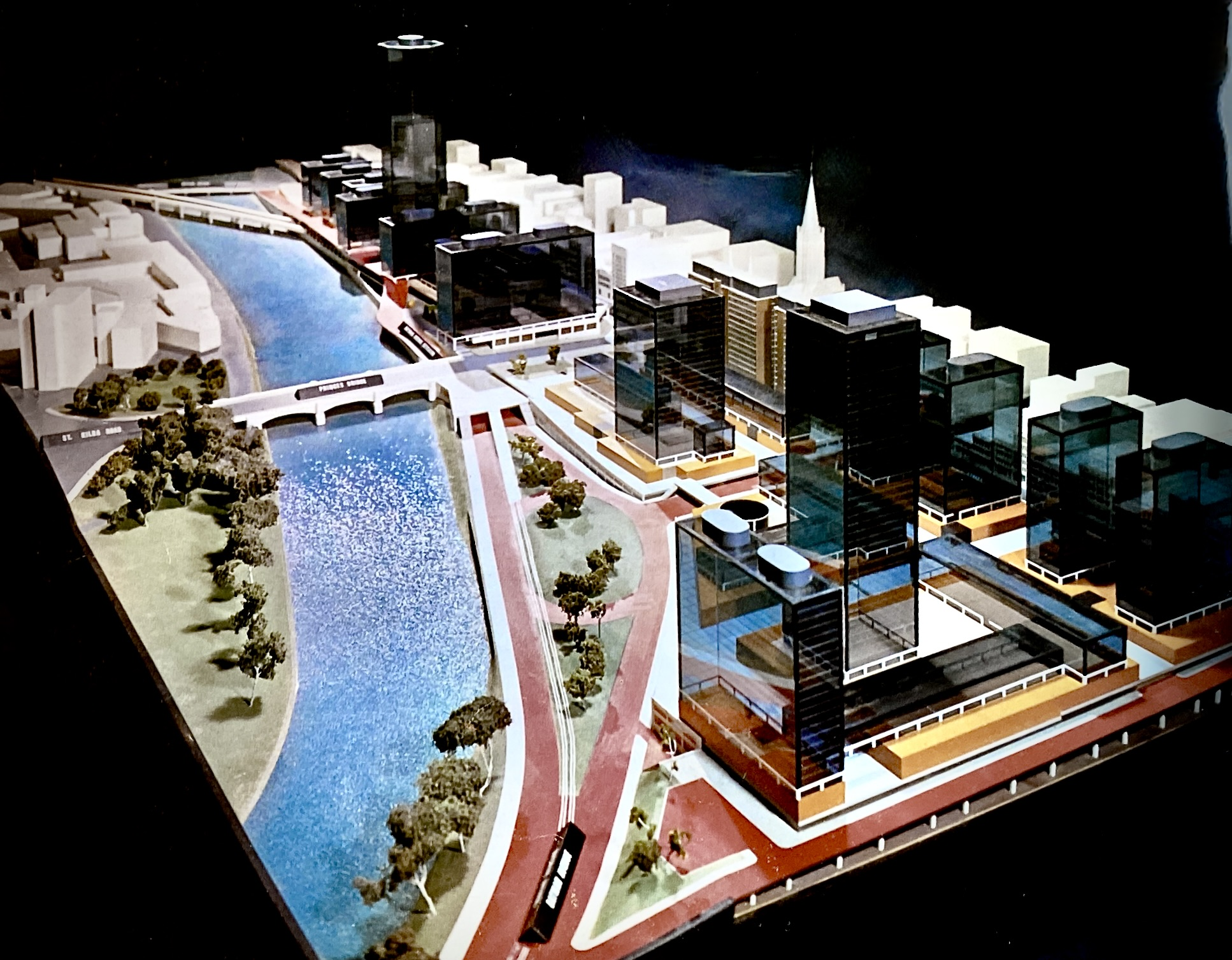
Model showing Lend Lease's proposed further redevelopment of Melbourne's railway area, 1969

The towers were 17 storeys high and reached 70 m (230 ft). They were constructed with brown bricks from the East Burwood brickworks, and featured vertical strips of aluminium-framed windows. The office floors were punctuated by a regular grid of structural columns spaced 10 m (33 ft) apart. The ground floor retail spaces development housed a supermarket, ANZ bank, clothing stores, laundromat and the notable music store, Central Station Records.

The buildings were constructed over the still-functioning Princes Bridge station, the terminus of the Epping and Hurstbridge lines since 1910. The station's separate identity and name was lost in 1980, when it was merged into Flinders Street station as platforms 14, 15 and 16.

== Public reception ==
The towers elicited mixed reactions from the general public when first unveiled. They were appreciated by some as modernist architectural icons, but many regarded the towers as eyesores, and criticised their size and placement. The towers were considered to have cut the city off from the river and also detracted from the views towards St Paul's Cathedral and Flinders Street from the entry to the city along St Kilda Road and Princes Bridge from the south.

An Australian Women's Weekly article from 1969 expresses the general public sentiment about the towers at the time:

"Once the graceful spires of St. Paul's Cathedral dominated the southern entry to Melbourne. In 1967, the ultra modern twin towers of the princes gate complex raised their lean, unornamented 17 storeys to rob strollers on the banks of the Yarra of their traditional view."

== Demolition ==
Following the privatisation of the Gas and Fuel Corporation in 1995, Victorian Premier Jeff Kennett announced in 1996 that the Princes Gate towers were to be demolished to make way for a new arts complex and civic hub. By that time, they were generally seen to be an eyesore, and their demolition was welcomed. The towers were demolished floor by floor in 1996 and 1997, and what became known as Federation Square was built from 1997 to 2002.
