= Corbett Lyon =

Australian architect

Corbett Marshall Lyon AO (born 13 August 1955) is an Australian architect, art patron and academic who lives and works in Melbourne. He is a founding director of Melbourne architectural firm Lyons. With partners Carey Lyon, Cameron Lyon (died 2018), Neil Appleton, Adrian Stanic and James Wilson he has designed many award-winning institutional and public buildings in Australia.

Lyon is one of Australia's leading collectors and patrons of Australian contemporary art and since 1990 he has developed the Lyon Collection with his wife Yueji. In 2003–2008 he designed and built the Lyon Housemuseum, a hybrid residence and art museum, which displays the Lyon Collection and makes it available for public viewing.

Lyon is a professorial fellow and visiting professor in design at the University of Melbourne where he teaches and researches in the Melbourne School of Design. In 2016 he was awarded a Doctor of Architecture (honoris causa) by the university.

He was appointed an Officer of the Order of Australia in the 2025 King's Birthday Honours for "distinguished service to architecture, to the arts as a benefactor and administrator, and to tertiary education".

== Family and education ==
Lyon was born in Melbourne to architect Ronald ('Tiger') Lyon and Marietta Perrott (interior designer).

Attending Brighton Grammar School from 1961, he graduated Dux in 1973, and studied architecture at the University of Melbourne, graduating in 1979.

He then entered an extended family of architects which included his maternal grandfather, Leslie M Perrott Snr and two uncles, Leslie M Perrott Jnr and Eric Lyon. Both his parents worked in his grandfather's firm, Leslie M Perrott & Associates, which became Perrott Lyon Mathieson in 1970 when his father became a partner. All three of his brothers, Cameron, Carey and Hamish, became practicing architects. In 2019 Lyon's two daughters Carlin and Jaqlin were studying architecture at the University of Melbourne, heading up the fourth generation.

Lyon won an ITT International Fellowship to study in the US where he undertook a one-year Master of Architecture program at the University of Pennsylvania. He studied under architects Steven Izenour and Aldo van Eyck, futurist Buckminster Fuller and urban planner Edmund Bacon.

During his studies he worked part-time in the Philadelphia offices of architects Venturi, Scott Brown and Associates and following his graduation in 1980, he worked full time in the firm's New York office.

In 2018 he completed a PhD at RMIT University, Melbourne.

== Architecture ==
In 1981 Lyon returned to Australia and established architectural firm Lyon + Lyon with his brother Cameron. The firm designed institutional, commercial and government buildings including the Butterfly House at the Melbourne Zoological Gardens and a commemorative arch in Melbourne celebrating Victoria's 1984 sesquicentenary. The brothers' work was exhibited at the XIIe Biennale de Paris in 1982.

In 1996 Lyon established architectural practice Lyons Architects with his brother Carey Lyon. Cameron Lyon joined the practice in 1998 as a director and worked in the firm until his death in 2018. The firm currently has five directors which include Neil Appleton, Adrian Stanic and James Wilson. The firm designs large scale institutional, commercial and cultural projects and has won many national and international design awards.

In 2000 Lyons represented Australia as the country's sole representative at the 7th International Architecture Biennale in Venice.

== Notable works ==
- New Queensland Children's Hospital, Brisbane
- Swanston Academic Building. RMIT University, Melbourne
- BHP Billiton Global Headquarters, Melbourne
- John Curtin School of Medical Research, Canberra
- Central Institute of TAFE, Perth
- Menzies Research Institute, Hobart
- UWS School of Medicine, Sydney
- Melbourne Brain Centre, Melbourne
- Lyon Housemuseum, Melbourne
- Kangan Institute, Automotive Centre of Excellence, Melbourne
- Hedley Bull Centre, Australian National University, Canberra
- New School of Law at University of NSW, Sydney
- Victoria University Online Training Centre, St Albans (Winner of Victorian Architecture Medal)
- Marine and Freshwater Research Institute, Queenscliff

== Teaching ==
Lyon has taught at the University of Melbourne as a visiting critic and lecturer since 1984. He is currently a professorial fellow at the university and is a visiting professor in design at the Melbourne School of Design in the Faculty of Architecture, Building and Planning.

He lectures widely on architectural design and design practice and innovation and has given lectures and seminars at the Royal Academy of Arts, London, the Otis School of Design in Los Angeles, the University of Pennsylvania, Cornell University and the Architectural League of New York.

== Contemporary art ==
Lyon is one of Australia's leading collectors and patrons of contemporary art. Since 1990 he has developed the Lyon Collection with his wife Yueji. The collection comprises over 350 artworks, including paintings, sculptures, installation works, photography and video art. More than 50 Australian artists are currently represented in the Collection.

Between 2003 and 2005 he designed the Lyon Housemuseum, a hybrid residence and art museum which opened to the public in 2009. The Housemuseum offers pre-booked public tours and school visits on designated days each year. The Housemuseum sponsors an annual series of lectures and talks on art, architecture, art history and museology. The annual Lyon Housemuseum Lecture is published in the form of a small book.

In 2012 Lyon and his wife established the Lyon Foundation to provide a permanent future home for the Lyon Collection.

The Foundation has constructed a new public art museum, also designed by Lyon, on a site adjacent to the Housemuseum. The new museum opened in March 2019.

Lyon is a Trustee of the National Gallery of Victoria and a member of the International Council of Museums.
