= Colin Laverty =

Australian medical practitioner

Dr Colin Laverty OAM
- Born: 26 May 1937; Sydney, New South Wales
- Died: 2 August 2013 (aged 76); Sydney, New South Wales
- Education: Newington College; University of Sydney
- Occupation: Medical practitioner
- Spouses: 1965 Jill Taylor (div. 1977): 1982 Elizabeth Kleimeyer
- Children: 2 sons, 1 daughter 1 stepdaughter
- Parent(s): Dr. Colin (Tas) Laverty; Dr. Beryl Laverty

Colin Robert Andrew Laverty (26 May 1937 – 9 February 2013) was an Australian medical practitioner. He was the first to confirm (using electron microscopy) that the human papillomavirus was much more common in the cervix than previously thought; in 1978 he suggested that it should be investigated for possible involvement in the causation of cervical cancer. He was also a prolific art collector.

== Early life ==
Laverty was born in Sydney, New South Wales, the son of medical practitioners Colin (Tas) Laverty and Beryl Laverty. He attended Newington College (1949–1953) and then the University of Sydney. He graduated BSc(Med) with honours in 1959, Bachelor of Medicine and Surgery in 1962 and Diploma in Clinical Pathology in 1969, and subsequently obtained by examination Fellowship of the Royal College of Pathologists of Australasia and a Diploma in Cytology from the same college. He had the qualifications MB, BS; BSc (Med); Diploma in Clinical Pathology (DCP) (Syd); FRCPA; and Post-Fellowship Diploma in Cytopathology (Dip.Cytopath.) (FRCPA).

While at the University of Sydney, Laverty was awarded a Blue for Rowing.

== Medical career ==
Laverty graduated in medicine from the University of Sydney. He trained in pathology at Royal Prince Alfred and King George V Hospitals in Sydney, as well at Saint Mary's Hospital, Manchester, in the United Kingdom. He specialised early in gynaecological cytology and histopathology. He became a staff specialist pathologist at the Royal Women's Hospital in Melbourne, and later at King George V Hospital for Mothers and Babies in Sydney.

Laverty co-authored more than 50 scientific articles. He was a frequent and often invited speaker at medical conferences in Australia and internationally. For many years, he was a member of the Advisory Committee to the Australian National Cervical Screening Program, multiple New South Wales Cancer Council Committees, the Committee of the Australian Society for Colposcopy and Cervical Pathology, and the Continuing Education, Quality Assurance and Evolving Technologies Committees of the International Academy of Cytology.

=== Work on HPV and cervical screening ===
In the mid-1970s, while working as a specialist gynaecological pathologist at King George V Hospital in Sydney, Laverty developed a special interest in the recognition in the Papanicolaou smear of various female genital tract infections, in particular those due to agents difficult or impossible to culture. In the early 1970s it was thought that genital tract warts (condylomas) were quite uncommon, usually vulval, and merely sometimes cosmetically distressing lesions.

Laverty recognised that cellular abnormalities known as koilocytosis and koilocytotic or "warty" atypia (first reported in the 1950s by Koss and associated with genital warts) were much more common in Pap smears than generally realised, and that, surprisingly, in the great majority of cases, clinical warts or condylomas were absent, even on careful clinical examination of the entire female genital tract. This raised the possibility that genital infections due to wart or papilloma virus were much more common than previously thought, frequently cervical in location, and very uncommonly of recognisable warty contour or configuration.

A researcher was employed and an electron microscopic technique was then devised, which confirmed the suspicion that human papillomavirus (HPV) particles were present in these abnormal cells, in both cytologic and histologic preparations (Pap smears and cervical biopsies). In 1978, Laverty was one of the first in the world to publish this finding. Thus it was proven that atypical, potentially premalignant cells in cervical cytologic and histopathologic preparations in women without actual genital warts were, in fact, virus-infected, and that this virus had the electron microscopic appearances of papillomavirus.

At that time, electron microscopic demonstration of the virus particles within the nucleus of the cell was the only available way to confirm papillomavirus infection. In contradistinction to other viruses affecting the genital tract (e.g. herpes), confirmation by culture was not possible (and still is not possible) by conventional virological methods. Nor could the diagnosis be confirmed by immunoperoxidase testing or by HPV DNA and RNA hybridisation techniques (the latter subsequently widely used), which at that time had not yet been developed.

Subsequently, the histologic features and colposcopic recognition and characterisation of this sub-clinical or non-condylomatous HPV infection of the cervix were established.

Recognition of the frequent and close association of these noncondylomatous HPV-induced changes with high-grade cervical intraepithelial neoplasia (CIN) - which was, and is, accepted as preceding life-threatening invasive cancer - led Laverty to also suggest in 1978 the investigation of the possible role of HPV in genital tract carcinogenesis. Also, if cervical cancer proved to be due to, or required, a virus infection for its genesis, then prevention by immunisation was theoretically possible.

The suspicion and subsequent confirmation by Laverty that papillomavirus infection was much more common than formerly realised, that most infections were clinically invisible and at that time unknown to colposcopists, proved to be of profound clinical significance. This changed the interpretation of Pap smears, cervical biopsies and colposcopic appearances, and therefore the management of women with abnormal Pap smears.

Articles on quality assurance in cytology published by Laverty and his team concerned the importance of targeted sampling of the transformation zone (where most precancer and cancer occurs), sampling implement choice, reporting terminology and management recommendations.

He was also interested in the cytologic recognition of cervical adenocarcinoma in situ (an important subset of cervical cancer precursors), and demonstrated a place for HPV in this form of cervical cancer also.

Laverty also evaluated new slide making and reading technologies, leading to improved Pap smear reporting accuracy and published some of the first trials of ThinPrep and CytoRich, technologies which are now widely used throughout the world.

=== Dr Colin Laverty and Associates ===
In 1982, he founded Dr Colin Laverty and Associates, a private pathology practice which provided specialised services in gynaecological cytology and histopathology. Approximately 200,000 Pap smears were processed annually.

The practice provided referring general practitioners and gynaecologists with a great deal of educational material (newsletters, feedback on smear quality, etc.) aimed at improving standards in cytology.

The practice employed a statistician, and much clinical research was carried out in private practice (which is most unusual), with regular publications in Australian and prestigious overseas medical journals.

Over many years, Laverty lectured widely (often as an invited speaker) in Australia and overseas on the significance of HPV infection and on a range of gynaecological cytology and Pap smear screening issues.

In August 1998, his practice was sold to Health Care of Australia (HCoA). He was initially medical director of Mayne Health – Laverty Pathology in New South Wales. The practice was renamed Symbion Laverty Pathology and subsequently onsold to Primary Health Care, a very large, statewide, general pathology practice which still bears Laverty's name.

== Art activities ==
Laverty retired from practising medicine in mid-2001 and, with his wife Elizabeth, managed their contemporary art collection, one of Australia's best known. Works from their collection are regularly lent to the Australian national and state art galleries. In particular, Aboriginal works are regularly sought for exhibition by prestigious international art museums. Laverty authored a book and published a number of articles on Australian art.

Over decades, Colin and Elizabeth Laverty were major art collectors and supporters of young, mid-career and established Australian artists, both Indigenous and non-Indigenous. They were substantial donors of artworks under the Cultural Gifts Program. Since 2000, 131 paintings have been donated to the Newcastle, Geelong, Benalla and Gold Coast regional galleries, the Museum and Art Gallery of the Northern Territory, the National Gallery of Victoria, the Art Gallery of NSW and the Museum of Contemporary Art Australia in Sydney. 53 of these are works by 41 different Indigenous artists, and 78 are by 35 different non-Indigenous artists. Many works were also loaned to exhibitions overseas.

The Lavertys were financial supporters and members of the Foundation of the Museum of Contemporary Art, Sydney, for many years, and in 2006 were awarded Life Membership "in recognition of their outstanding contribution to the Museum’s development". They were also members of the Contemporary Collection Benefactors groups at the Art Gallery of NSW and the Art Gallery of South Australia, the Aboriginal Collection Benefactors at the Art Gallery of NSW, and the Friends of Indigenous art at the National Gallery of Victoria.

The Lavertys were regular lenders to exhibitions at major Australian public art galleries. Paintings were lent for exhibitions at the National Gallery of Australia, Canberra and the state galleries in Queensland, New South Wales, Victoria, South Australia, Tasmania, Western Australia and the Museum and Art Gallery of the Northern Territory.

Laverty actively promoted Australian art overseas, and spoke by invitation about Australian art, especially Aboriginal art, at the Chicago Arts Club, a leading arts institution. In June 2006, he gave a keynote presentation at the opening of an exhibition of works by Australian women Aboriginal painters in Washington, D.C. He engaged in discussions with gallery directors in both Europe and the U.S.A. about the presentation of contemporary Aboriginal art.

Laverty wrote, upon invitation, an article on collecting Australian Aboriginal art for the November 2003 issue of the magazine Arts of Asia, produced in Hong Kong. The rest of this issue was devoted to Australian public museums' collections of Asian art. This was an opportunity to promote Australian Aboriginal art widely, as the magazine has a substantial worldwide circulation. The article, titled "Diversity and Strength - Contemporary Australian Aboriginal Art: A Private Collection", surveyed the long term history and the recent development and success of contemporary Aboriginal art. It discussed the major art producing communities and illustrated the work of 23 of the best known artists.

Laverty has been an invited speaker to gallery friends, volunteers, collection benefactors and society members at the Art Gallery of Western Australia (AGWA), the Art Gallery of South Australia (AGSA), the National Gallery of Victoria, the Art Gallery of NSW (AGNSW), and the Power Institute at Sydney University and the National Gallery of Australia (NGA). He was an invited panellist at discussions on Australian art at the Art Gallery of NSW (AGNSW) and at the Melbourne Art Fair.

Beyond Sacred: Recent painting from Australia's remote Aboriginal communities, a book compiled by Colin Laverty and designed by Jane Kleimeyer, was published in May 2008. It featured 280 paintings by 141 Indigenous artists from more than 20 communities. A second edition of this award-winning book was published in 2011, after the first edition had sold out.

Apart from his active involvement in the promotion of contemporary art, Laverty was a foremost authority, researcher and writer on Australian colonial sporting art.

In 1980 he authored a volume entitled Australian Colonial Sporting Painters: Frederick Woodhouse and Sons, about the Woodhouse family of animal and sporting artists active in Australia in the second half of the 19th century. In 1983/84 Laverty conceived, curated and wrote the catalogue for a touring exhibition of the work of 21 artists active in this field of animal and sporting painting in colonial times in Australia. Titled Pastures and Pastimes, this was presented by the Victorian Ministry for the Arts and shown at the Victorian Artists Society Gallery, Melbourne; the Geelong Art Gallery; and the S.H. Ervin National Trust Gallery, Sydney. He was also a contributor of biographical details on the colonial artists Thomas Balcombe, Joseph Fowles, S S Knights, Thomas Lyttleton, Edward Winstanley and Frederick Woodhouse to the Dictionary of Australian Artists, edited by Professor Joan Kerr and published by Oxford University Press in 1992. These artists were principally involved, but not exclusively, with sporting and animal painting.

Laverty was a staunch supporter of charitable causes associated with Indigenous art. He was a committee member of the Western Desert Dialysis Appeal held in 2000 in conjunction with auctioneers Sotheby's Australia at the Art Gallery of NSW. The more than one million dollars raised at this auction enabled renal dialysis to occur at very remote Kintore (Walungurru) in the Western desert in the south of the Northern Territory. The money raised also supported social workers, interpreters and health care liaison staff, both in remote communities and in association with the renal unit in Alice Springs.

The Lavertys travelled repeatedly over several decades to central and northern Australia, and had a long association with the community-owned art centres at more than 20 remote Aboriginal communities. They were involved in bringing the need for youth social workers in these very disadvantaged communities to federal authorities.

The Lavertys were supporters of the Swimming Pool Appeal auction held in 2005 at the Art Gallery of NSW to raise money for pools at Maningrida and Kintore (Walungurru). Approximately $850,000 was raised for this cause, as pool use has been convincingly associated with improved health and education in Aboriginal children. The Lavertys were donors of artwork for auction at both the Western Desert Dialysis Appeal and at the more recent Swimming Pool Appeal.

== Honours ==
- Medal of the Order of Australia - 26 January 2008 (for service to medicine in the fields of gynaecological cytology and histopathology, particularly through the advancement of cervical screening services in Australia and through developments in establishing the role of the human papillomavirus in the genesis of cervical cancer; and to art, particularly Indigenous art both in Australia and overseas)

== Publications (books/catalogues) ==
- Australian Colonial Sporting Painters: Frederick Woodhouse and Sons (Sydney, 1980), The David Ell Press, ISBN 0-908197-19-5
- Pastures and Pastimes: An exhibition of Australian Racing, Sporting and Animal Pictures of the 19th Century, Victorian Ministry for the Arts (Melbourne 1983), catalogue, ISBN 0-7241-5392-6, 1983
- Beyond Sacred: Recent Painting from Australia's remote Aboriginal communities, Hardie Grant Books (Melbourne 2008), ISBN 978-1-74066-570-4 (hbk)
- Beyond Sacred: Australian Aboriginal Art, Kleimeyer Industries (Melbourne 2011), ISBN 978-0-646-54490-8 (hbk.)
