= Simon Mordant =

Australian-based investment banker and philanthropist

Simon Mordant AO
- Born: Simon David Mordant; 11 September 1959 (age 67); United Kingdom
- Citizenship: Australia
- Years active: 1980s–present
- Employer(s): Caliburn (1999–2010); Greenhill & Co. (2010–2014); Luminis Partners (2015–present)
- Known for: Investment banker, philanthropist & art collector
- Board member of: Museum of Contemporary Art Australia (2010–2020); Australian Broadcasting Corporation (2012–2017)
- Spouse: Catriona Mordant (m. 1988; died 2026)
- Honours: Officer of the Order of Australia; Knight of the Order of the Star of Italy

Simon Mordant AO is an Australian-based investment banker, art collector, and philanthropist. He started his career as an investment banker, before specializing in M&A. He co-founded Caliburn Partnership before it was acquired by Greenhill & Co. in 2010. He remained at Greenhill Australia for four years, leaving in 2014. In 2015, he co-founded Luminis Partners.

Mordant has been heavily involved in the arts in Australia. Since its foundation in the 1990s, Mordant has regularly made sizable donations to the Museum of Contemporary Art Australia, including a $15 million AUD donation in 2012. He served on its board a decade and was chair between 2010 and 2020. Mordant also served on the board for the Australian Broadcasting Corporation between 2012 and 2017.

Mordant holds the title of Officer of the Order of Australia and was Knighted in Italy for his contributions to the arts and business.

== Early life ==
Mordant was born in England, spending his childhood and teenage years there. At the age of seven, he was sent to boarding school. While there, he recalls taking an interest in art, and the teachers at the school encouraged him further. Having never left Europe, Mordant decided to take a gap year and travel through Afghanistan, Iran, and Pakistan. His traveling ended in Australia, where he settled and vowed to return.

He returned to the UK to complete his education, with the intention of using the qualifications to secure a job in Australia. Mordant completed his education in accounting, using the qualifications to relocate to Australia. He is a fellow of the Institute of Chartered Accountants.

== Life and career ==
He started as an accountant at Peat Marwick, before becoming an investment banker at Ord Minnett on the Corporate Advisory side. He moved from Ord to start rival BZW Australia in 1988. BZW was acquired in a deal worth $170 million by the Dutch-based investment group ABN AMRO in 1998. Mordant remained at the group of companies, running the corporate advisory business for ABN in Australia until he left in 1999.

In 1999, Mordant co-founded Caliburn Partnership. While at Caliburn, Mordant worked on a number of high-profile deals. In 2004, he played a major role in the sale of British Airways stake in Qantas. The deal resulted in BA raising $1.1 billion AUD, with commentators suggesting it would benefit both Qantas and BA long-term. BA aimed to reduce debt with the additional funds. The 42% stake that Castle Harlan held in television operator Austar was sold off in 2005. Mordant advised Patrick Corporation following the unsolicited takeover bid by Toll Group. The bid price reached $6.8 billion AUD before the board of Patrick Corporation recommended the bid.

In 2007, Mordant advised Edcon on its leveraged buyout by Bain Capital. A year later, he helped broker a $2.51 billion UAD deal between Malaysian-based Petronas and Australian energy company, Santos Limited.

In 2010, it was announced that US-based investment bank Greenhill & Co. would be acquiring Caliburn in a deal worth $200 million USD. Mordant remained at Greenhill Australia following the acquisition and worked on a number of notable merger and acquisition deals. In 2011, he was advisor to Coal & Allied after the media reported on a takeover offer by Rio Tinto, which valued the Australian-based mining group at $10.6 billion AUD. The deal was overseen by Mordant and was completed in November 2011.

It was announced that Mordant was part of the 2012 Australia Day Honours list, becoming a Member of the Order of Australia. The title was given by the Australian government "for service to the arts and to the cultural environment of Australia through philanthropic and executive roles, and to the community." He was also made a member of the board at the Australian Broadcasting Corporation.

During the same year, Mordant was the defense advisor to GrainCorp following its $2.68 billion UAD approach from Archer Daniels Midland. In 2014, it was announced that both Mordant and Malek would be leaving Greenhill Australia.

In 2015, Mordant again partnered with Ron Malek and Jamie Garis to co-found corporate advisory firm, Luminis Partners. Luminis received financial backing from New York-listed advisory firm, Evercore.

Luminis and Mordant have played a major role in a number of takeovers and mergers in Australia from 2015 onwards. One of the first deals he worked on was the unsolicited offer by Woodside Petroleum for rival Oil Search. An offer of $11.6 billion AUD was put forward but was ultimately rejected by Oil Search. During the same period, Mordant advised Origin Energy's sale of its stake in Contact Energy. The stake in Contact was sold off for $1.8 billion AUD.

In August 2019, it was announced that Shell would be moving into the Australian market with the acquisition of ERM Power. ERM at the time was the second-biggest energy retailer in the country, with Shell completing the acquisition for $617 million AUD. The ERM Power acquisition deal was brokered by Luminis, with Mordant overseeing the deal. Mordant also worked on another energy-related deal in 2019, advising on the acquisition of Lattice Energy by Beach Energy. The agreed acquisition price was $1.6 billion AUD.

During the same period, Mordant advised Lynas following an unsolicited takeover bid from Wesfarmers. The $1.5b AUD bid was dropped by Wesfarmers shortly after the takeover bid was made public.

It was announced in June 2020 that Mordant would be part of the Queen's 2020 Birthday Honours list. He would become an Officer of the Order of Australia. He was also knighted in Italy during the same year.

During the COVID-19 pandemic, Mordant was the exclusive financial advisor to Qantas, with the airline planning to raise $1.9 billion AUD to survive the pandemic and lack of global travel.

== Arts and philanthropy ==
While in London, Mordant visited the Royal Academy of Arts' Summer Show in 1982. At the exhibition, he purchased his first piece of art, a painting by Judith Feaney. According to The Sydney Morning Herald, Mordant spent an entire week's wages on the painting. After purchasing the painting, Mordant wrote to Feaney, asking her to explain the picture to him. She wrote back, and Mordant taped her letter to the back.

On moving to Australia in the 1980s, Mordant stated in interviews he was surprised that there was no contemporary art museum in Sydney. He was introduced to Stewart Wallis and Leon Paroissien, who went onto become the founding director of the Museum of Contemporary Art Australia. Mordant and his wife became founding donors to the MCA, with it opening its doors in 1991. His close involvement with the funding and founding of the museum saw him join the Foundation Board. He states that the MCA struggled initially, before "bursting at the seams" in the 2000s with visitors. In 2007, he became chair of the MCA Foundation and in 2010 Chair of MCA Board. It resulted in a fundraising effort to expand the Museum of Contemporary Art, with the Mordant family contributing $15 million towards the project. Since the investment, Mordant and his wife have received frequent media coverage for their donations to the arts in Australia.

Since the start of the COVID-19 pandemic in 2020, Mordant spoke frequently about its impact on Australia's art scene and the struggle some galleries were facing. His philanthropic efforts saw him make numerous donations to the arts in Australia to keep some institutions afloat. He was also critical of the media in Australia for its lack of coverage of the arts in the country.

In July 2020, Mordant announced that he would step aside as Chair of the MCA board.

In December 2020, Mordant became an honorary professor at the Centre of Visual Arts (CoVA), part of the University of Melbourne. It was suggested that Mordant would play a central role in CoVA's 10-year plan, which would see him forge closer ties with museums and educational institutions in Europe and the United States.

== Board positions ==
Mordant is vice-chair of MoMA PS1 in New York, board member of American Academy in Rome, Executive Committee of the Tate International Council, member of MoMA International Council, Chair the Visual Arts Board for the NSW Government, chair the Lend Lease Public Art program at Barangaroo, a member of the Advisory Board of Venetian Heritage in Italy, MCA's first International Ambassador for Museum of Contemporary Art Australia and Gallerie dell'Accademia in Venice.

He is past Australian Commissioner at Venice Biennale (2013 and 2015), board of Opera Australia, Sydney Theatre Company, and deputy president of Australian Takeovers Panel.

== Personal life ==
Mordant married Catriona in 1988 and the couple had a son. Catriona died in October 2026 after a battle with cancer.

== Honours ==
- Member of the Order of Australia (AM) in 2012.
- Officer of the Order of Australia (AO) in 2020.
- Honorary Consul of San Marino to Australia (12 April 2021).

Diplomatic posts
Preceded by Peter Julian Tilley as Honorary consul-general (2007–2018)	Honorary Consul of San Marino to Australia; 2021–present	Incumbent
