= Perrott Lyon Mathieson =

Australian architecture firm

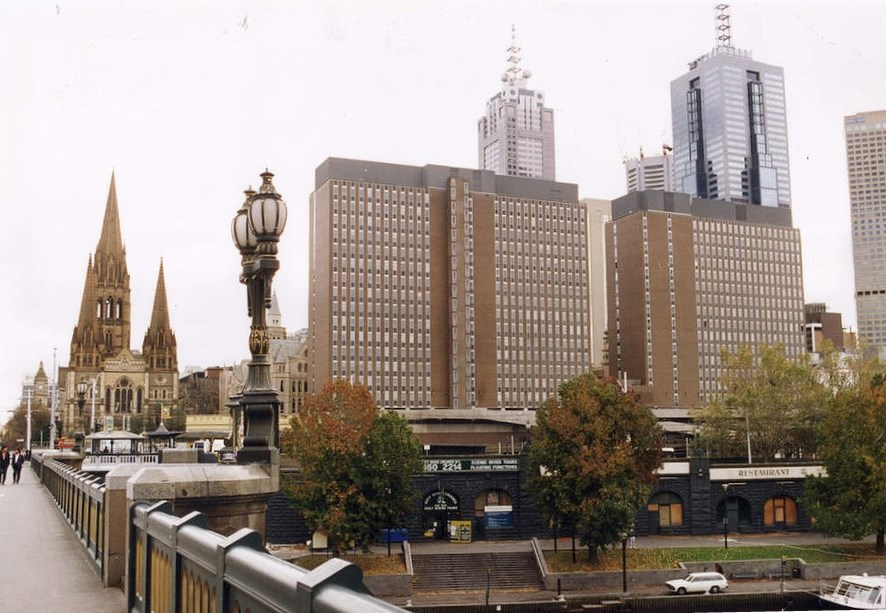
Princes Gate Towers, Flinders Street, 1967 (dem 1996)

Perrott Lyon Mathieson was an Australian architecture firm based in Melbourne, Australia. Founded by Leslie M Perrott in 1914, the firm was responsible for numerous high-profile projects from the 1920s to the 1990s, and was associated with the Perrott and Lyon architectural families, spanning three generations and eight practitioners.

== History ==
The firm was founded by Leslie M. Perrott as a solo practice in 1914, who started designing houses in then-standard Edwardian style, but employing an early form of reinforced concrete, his first projects being in St Kilda and Essendon. His own house in Brighton, built in 1925 in the Old English style, was also made of concrete,

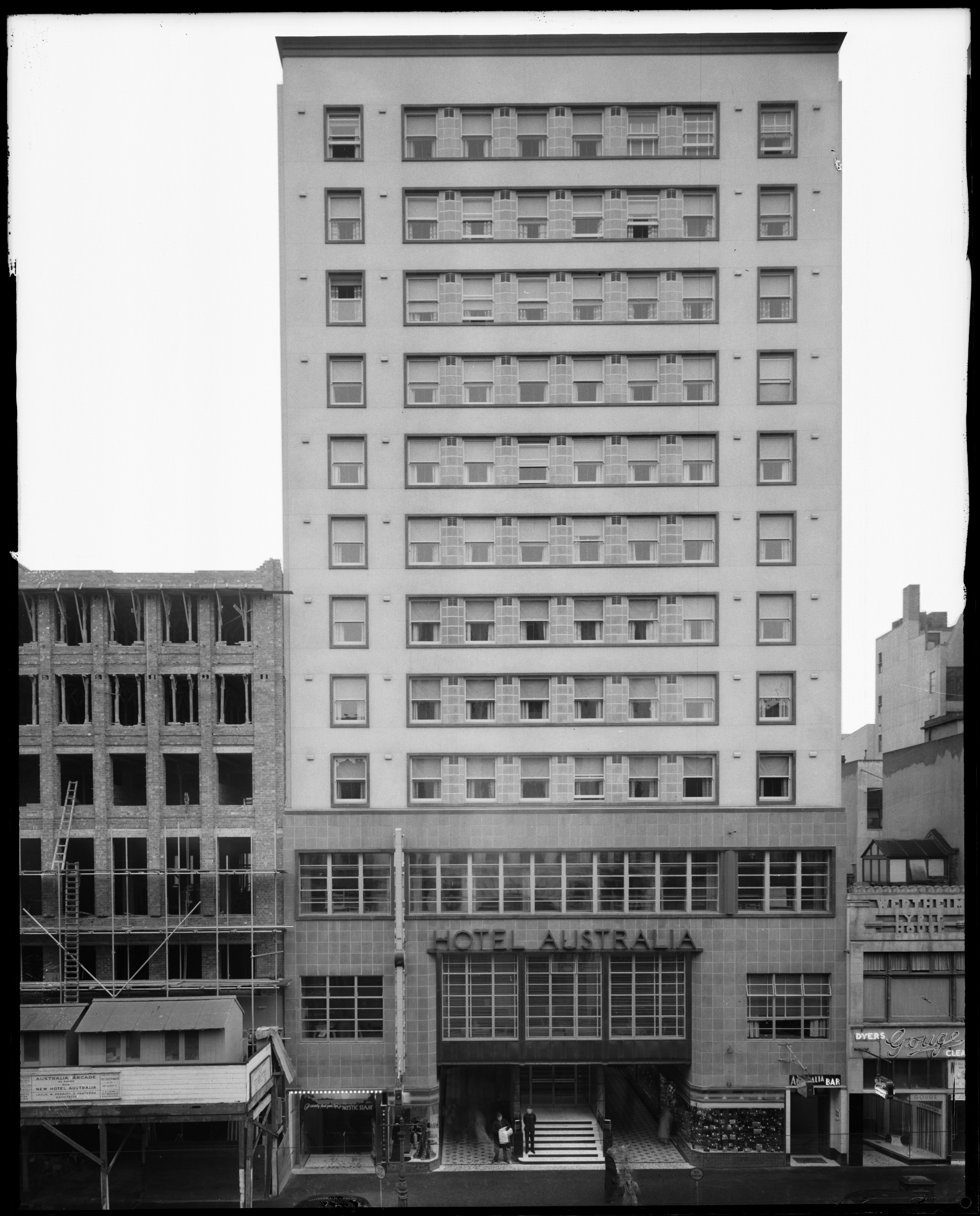
Hotel Australia, 1940s

From the later 1920s, Perrott specialised in large residential hotels. The first was the Alexander Hotel in Spencer Street, Melbourne (now the Savoy Hotel), which opened in 1928 with 200 bedrooms, all with bathrooms, an innovation at the time. In 1934, he oversaw the design and construction of the upmarket Chevron Hotel in St Kilda Road in only sixteen weeks, seen as important for Melbourne's centenary celebrations of that year. The Hotel Australia in Collins Street was the most modern in the city in 1939, and became the social epicentre of Melbourne in the 1940s. It was demolished in 1989.

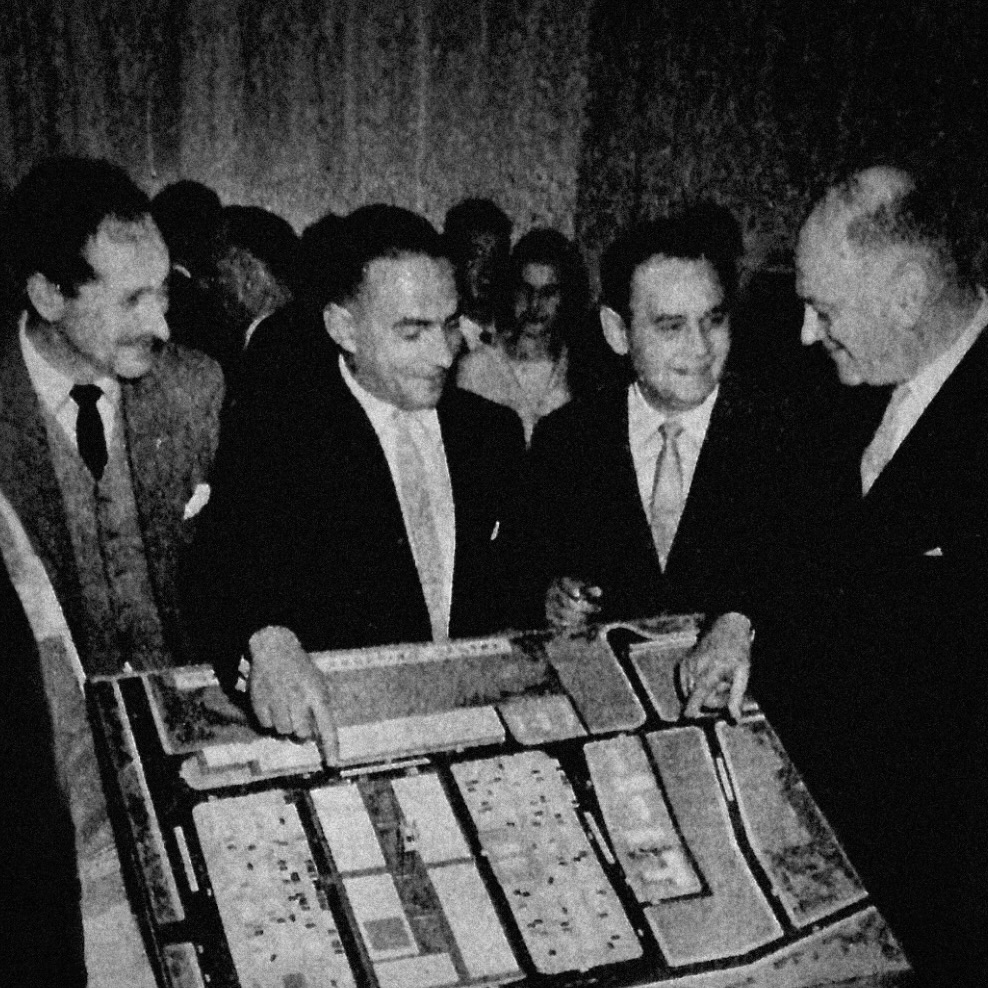
Leslie M. Perrott Junior (left) inspects model of proposed Forest Hill Shopping Centre, 1959

In the early 1950s, Perrott's son, also Leslie M Perrott, but known as Les Perrott (1926–2001), joined the firm, along with the dynamic young Ronald Lyon. Leslie M Perrott & Partners maintained a busy practice on large scale projects. They sometimes documented designs by other architects, such as that of US architects Welton Beckett for the Southern Cross Hotel in Bourke Street, opened in 1962 (demolished in 2004), then the most glamorous and up-to-date hotel in Melbourne.

Perrott Senior retired in 1966 in favour of his son. They were already working the firm's most controversial design, the Princes Gate Towers in Flinders Street, completed in 1967, and later known as the Gas & Fuel Buildings (demolished 1996). They also took on town planning projects as the Melbourne & Metropolitan Board of Works gradually relinquished powers to local Councils. In 1969 the firm was appointed to produce a town plan for the City of Prahran. In the early 1960s, the firm was engaged to investigate slum clearance in Carlton for the Housing Commission of Victoria. Known as the "Perrott Report" (1965), it recommended large-scale urban renewal, sweeping away seven blocks of terrace houses, shops and business to allow for the expansion of Melbourne University and the construction of high-density multi-storey housing. The report was opposed by the academics within the university's own architecture school, many of whom were resident in the area, and part of the nascent gentrification of the inner suburbs. Also opposed by the National Trust, the proposal was eventually abandoned.

In the late 1960s, Les Perrott, Ron Lyon, John Timlock and Ernst Kesa were made partners, the firm becoming Perrott Lyon Timlock & Kesa. It became involved in the design of tertiary colleges, notably the new Bundoora campus of the Preston Institute of Technology (now RMIT University) in 1973, and a new tower at the Caulfield Institute of Technology (now Monash University). In 1976, Timlock and Kesa retired, and Brian Mathieson became a partner, the firm becoming Perrott Lyon Mathieson, also known as "PLM".

By the mid-seventies, PLM was working on no fewer than four major Collins Street office towers, including the controversial Nauru House. Another major tower they designed at that time was the Brutalist style Spencer Street headquarters for the Melbourne & Metropolitan Board of Works, completed in 1979, and clad in bluestone, which began to fall off and had to be replaced with aluminium panels.

In the late 1970s, the Perrott office designed Museum underground station (now Melbourne Central, which opened in 1981. It was later heavily altered, apart from the platforms themselves . In the early 1980s, PLM worked with Gerard de Prue on the Rialto Towers, then the largest project in the city, and the tallest in the country from 1986 to 1991.

In the mid 1980s, Carey Lyon, one of Ron Lyon's four sons, who all studied architecture and were grandsons of the founder Leslie M Perrott though their mother, worked for the firm, bringing in the third generation. It was the lead designer for the Telstra Corporate Centre, completed in 1991. In the early 1990s, PLM were part of the collaborative team that designed Melbourne's first casino, Crown Melbourne, which opened in 1997. In the 1990s, they continued their work on colleges, such as the new Benalla campus for the Goulburn Ovens Institute of TAFE, in collaboration with Carey Lyon, who had been a co-director of PLM. The Lilydale Lake campus of the Eastern Institute of TAFE, now part of Box Hill TAFE, was also designed in collaboration with Carey Lyon, and won an Award of Merit in 1998. By about 2015, the firm had ceased activity.

== Key architects ==
=== Leslie M Perrott Senior (1892–1976) ===
Leslie Marsh Perrott Senior was born in Gippsland, and moved with his family to Melbourne after the death of his father, and studied architecture at the Melbourne Technical College.

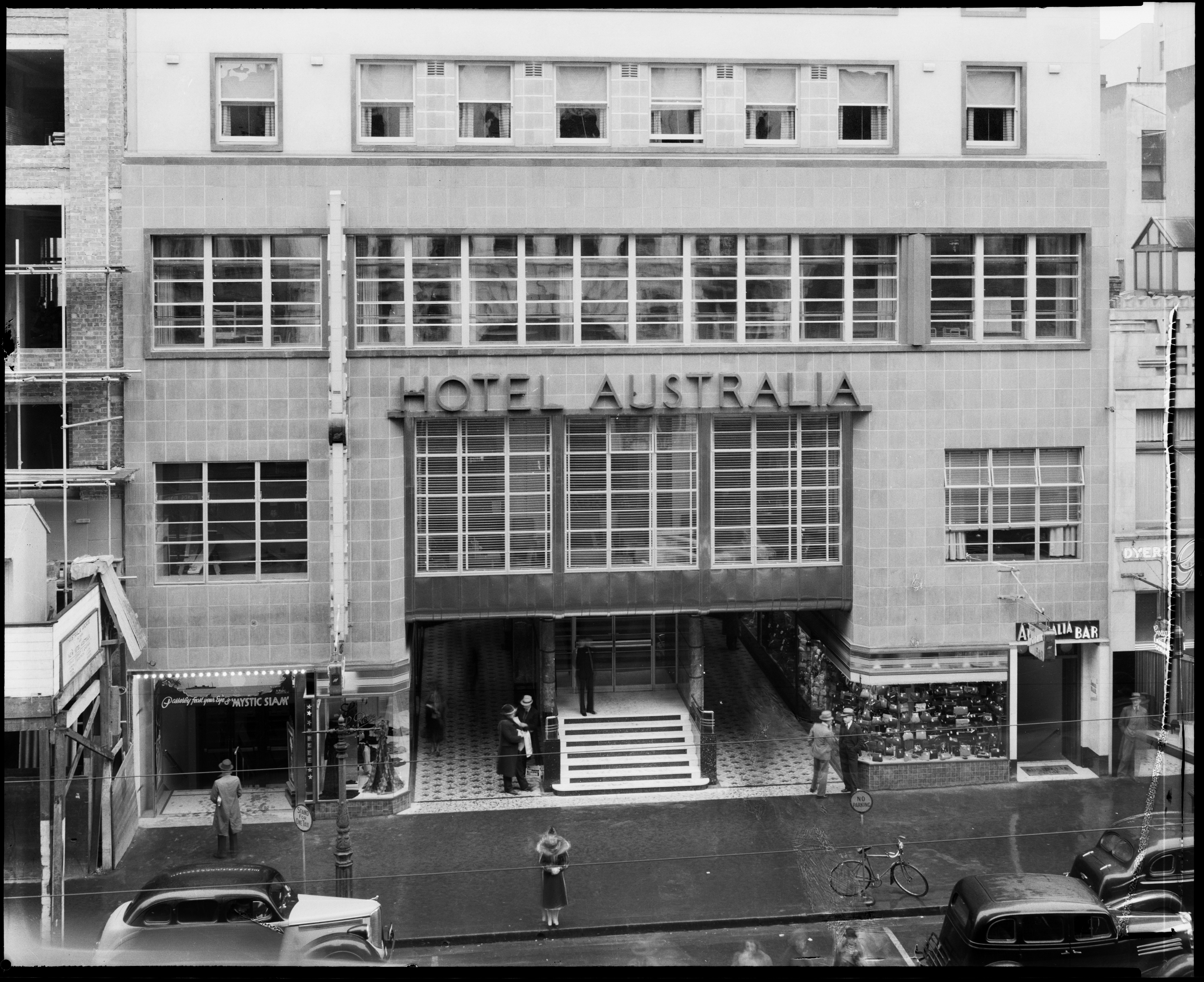
Hotel Australia, 1940s

In 1914, Perrott established his own practice which specialised in the use of concrete for houses. The practice flourished, later focusing on hotels, and Perrott was chosen by well-known pub owner Jimmy Richardson to accompany him on a fact finding tour of the United States in 1926 and then design his 'one extravagance', the Hotel Alexander, where Richardson lived in a penthouse on the top floor.

In 1925, having spent time in the United States, he married San Franciscan Marion Buell in 1924, and they settled in the new concrete house in Brighton.

He championed concrete for houses, publishing an article in 1924 featuring his own home and then a whole book on the subject in 1925 titled Concrete Homes. During the Great Depression, he became the president of the Building Industry Congress. He also was an active member in RVIA, admitted in 1920, becoming an associate in 1928, then elected vice-president in 1935, and president in 1939.

In 1955, he was awarded the Barrett Memorial Medal for his contribution in town planning.

Perrott retired in 1966 and the firm continued without changing name, since his son, now running the practice, was also named Leslie M Perrott.

=== Ronald Grant Lyon (1920–2006) ===
Ronald Lyon, known as 'Tiger', was born in Creswick but his family soon moved to Geelong. Ronald and his elder brother Eric were educated at the Geelong Junior Technical School (taught by their father, a respected chemistry teacher), Geelong High School and the Gordon Institute. The final years of the Gordon course merged with the Architectural Atelier, a night school at the University of Melbourne, and both Ron and Eric graduated as architects.

In the late 1930s, Lyon commuted to Melbourne to work in the offices of two great Modernists: Edward Billson and Frederick Romberg. In 1941, before completing his course, he enlisted in the AIF and served as a lieutenant in the Corps of Engineers in New Guinea. He obtained registration and became a member of the RVIA after returning from the war. In 1949, he worked for Maxwell Fry and Jane Drew in London. On his return in 1952 Lyon joined the office of Leslie M. Perrott & Associates. Ronald Lyon married Marietta Perrott, daughter of Leslie M Perrott Sr, who worked in her father's firm as an architecture renderer and illustrator; they had four sons, Corbett, Cameron (died 2018), Carey and Hamish, all of whom became architects. In 1996 three of the sons set up an office, Lyons Architecture which is one of Australia's leading architecture firms today. In 1970 'Tiger' became a formal partner, with Leslie M Perrott (Jnr), by then his brother in law. In the early 1980s he was the lead designer with Gerard De Prue on the Rialto Towers.

Throughout four decades of successful practice, Lyon was deeply involved in professional, industrial and welfare activities. He was President of the RVIA in 1965, and again under the new name, the 'RAIA Victorian Chapter', in 1966. In 1984 Ronald Lyon was awarded an AM for services to the community and his profession. Marietta died in 2003, followed by Ronald in 2006.

=== Leslie M Perrott Junior (1926–2001) ===
After graduating in 1951, Leslie Jnr, known simply as Les Perrott, set about expanding the office to take part in the postwar boom. With the retirement of his father in 1966, he became lead architect of the firm, along with Ron Lyon, and was generally responsible for getting in the work rather than designing. He was instrumental in designing the Forest Hill Shopping Centre.

=== Brian George Mathieson ===
In 1967 Brian Mathieson won an RAIA Silver Medal for his Thesis on High Density Housing. He was the lead designer for the MMBW project, and was the last remaining partner when the firm wound up c2015.

=== David Simpson (1929– ) ===
After graduation in 1955 and working for a few years in the UK and Canada, David Simpson joined the firm in the early 1960s, and was soon given the responsibility for the Princes Gate project. Because of this project, David was made the associate in charge of the Museum Underground Railway Station construction (see also City Loop). The station fit-out and loop graphics were undertaken for the firm by project designer Graeme Butler (see Graeme Butler), aided by Elton Cassumbhoy who was in charge of the project documentation, detailing and construction. Graeme also designed the Museum Station above-ground entrances: Queen Elizabeth Plaza facing Swanston street, and the North and South Station Entrances- all since demolished. David left when the firm contracted in about 1980.

=== Carey Lyon ===
The son of Ron Lyon and grandson of Leslie M Perrott, Carey graduated from the Melbourne University architecture course in 1982, and worked for Bates Smart McCutcheon before joining his father's firm in 1985, where he worked on the Telstra Corporate Centre, completed in 1992. He left the firm in 1996 to join his brother Corbett to form Lyons architects.

== Awards ==
- 1981 Garden State Award - Sunbury Pedestrianisation
- 1989 (Royal Australian Planning Institute) RAPI Urban Design Award - Malvern Square Development
- 1992 RAPI Award - N.E.S.T House
- 1992 RAIA Architecture Awards (Victoria Chapter) Residential Multiple - Merit Award, Queensberry Hill Youth Hostel
- 1993 RAIA Architecture Awards (Victoria Chapter) Commercial New Category - Telecom Corporate Building.
- 1998 RAIA Architecture Awards (Victoria Chapter) Institutional New & Award of Merit BHP Colorbond steel Award - the Goulburn Ovens Institute of TAFE, Benalla Campus (with Carey Lyon).
- 1998 RAIA Architecture Awards (Victoria Chapter) Institutional New - Eastern Institute of TAFE, Lilydale Lake Campus, Lilydale (with Carey Lyon).
- 1998 RAIA Architecture Awards (Victoria Chapter) Award of Merit - Crown Entertainment Complex Riverside Promenade (Bates Smart, Perrott Lyon Mathieson, and Daryl Jackson in association).
- 2001 RAIA Awards Victorian Chapter BHP Colorbond Award - Swinburne University, Lilydale Lake Campus, Stage 2, with Lyons Architects.
- 2002 RAIA Architecture Awards (Victoria Chapter) Heritage - 4 Treasury Place.
- 2004 RAIA Architecture Awards (Victoria Chapter) Commercial New - Crown Promenade Hotel (Perrott Lyon Mathieson with Bates Smart).

== Gallery ==
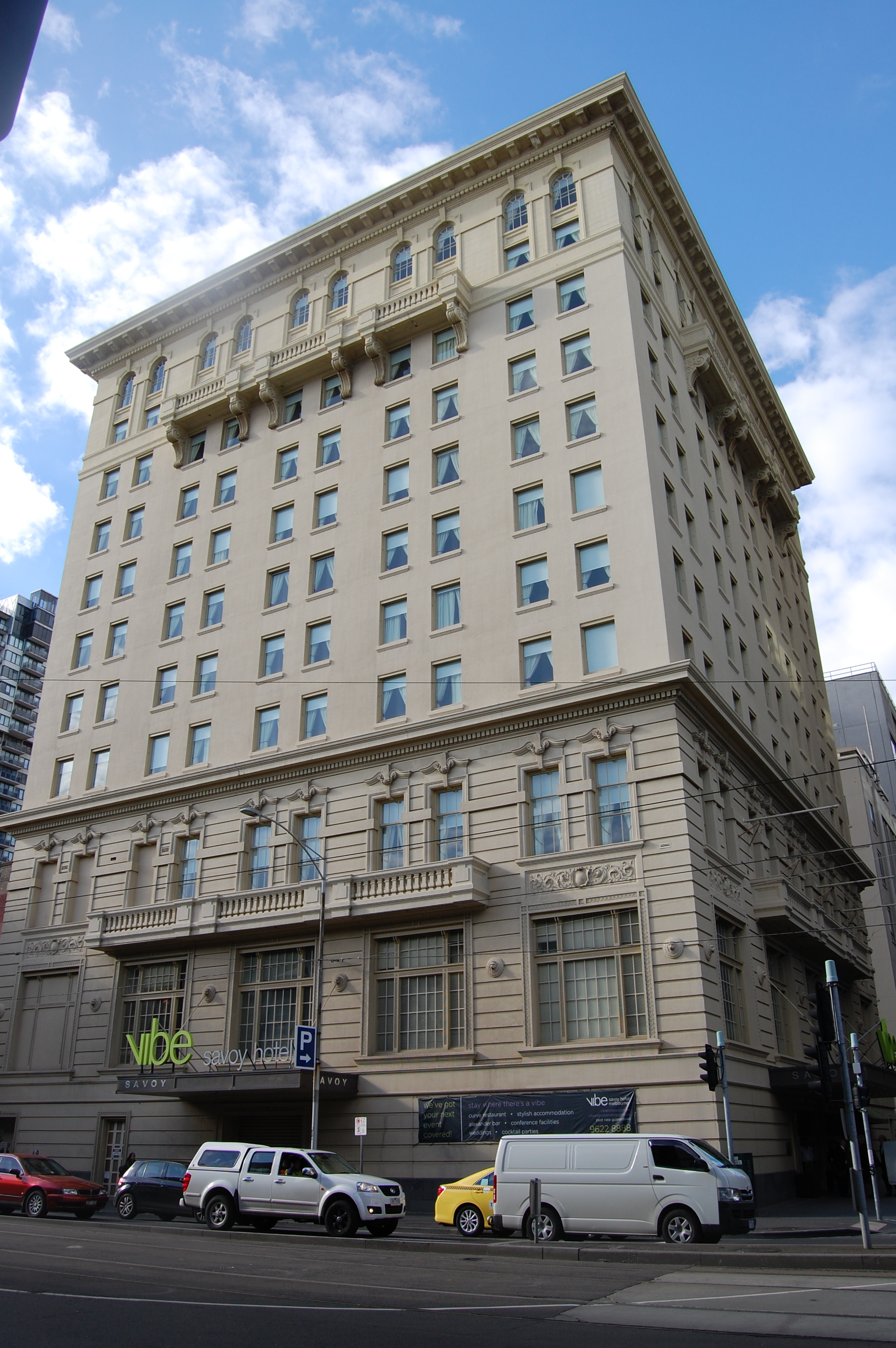
Hotel Alexander now Savoy Hotel, 1928

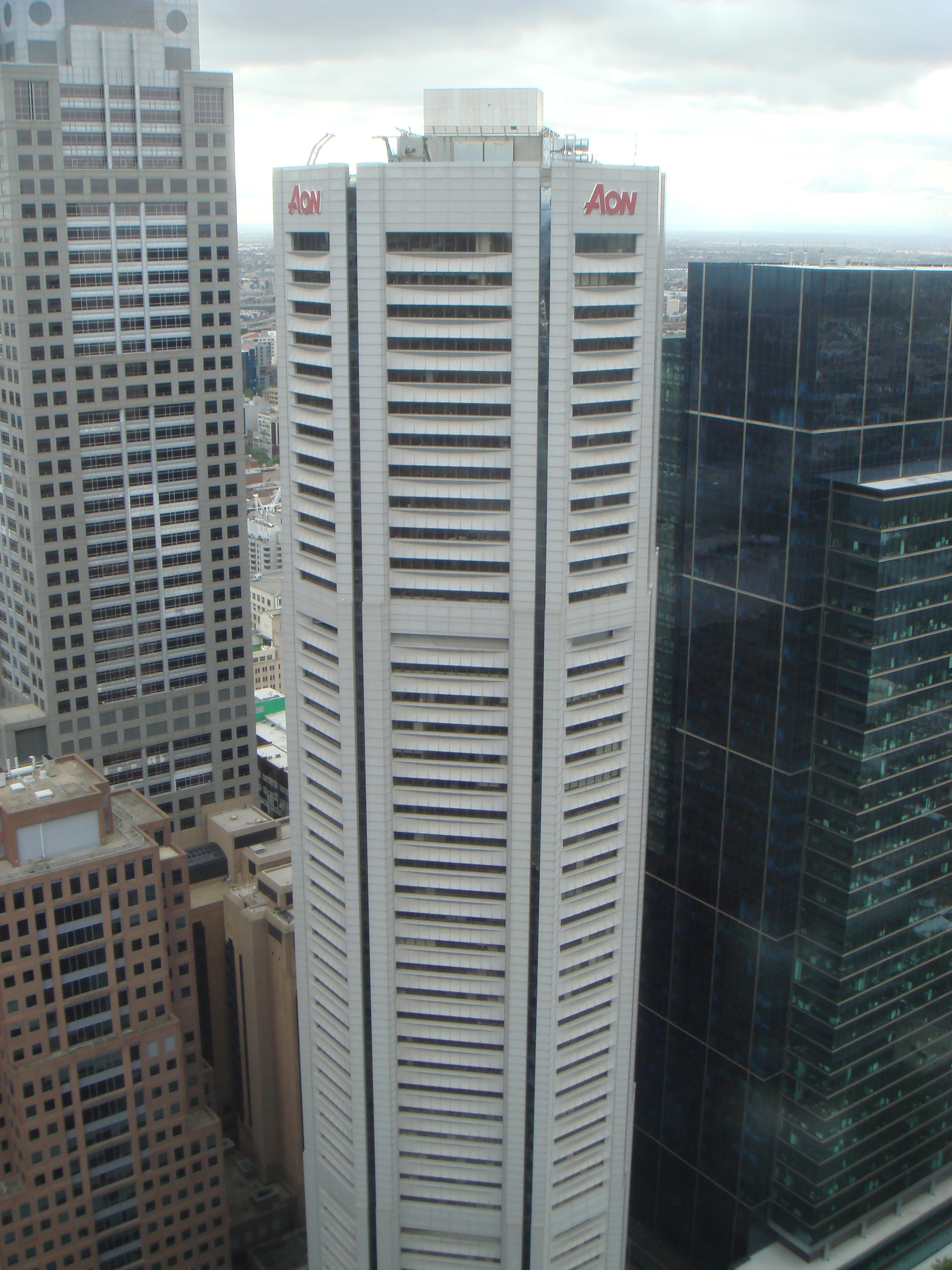
Nauru House, 1977

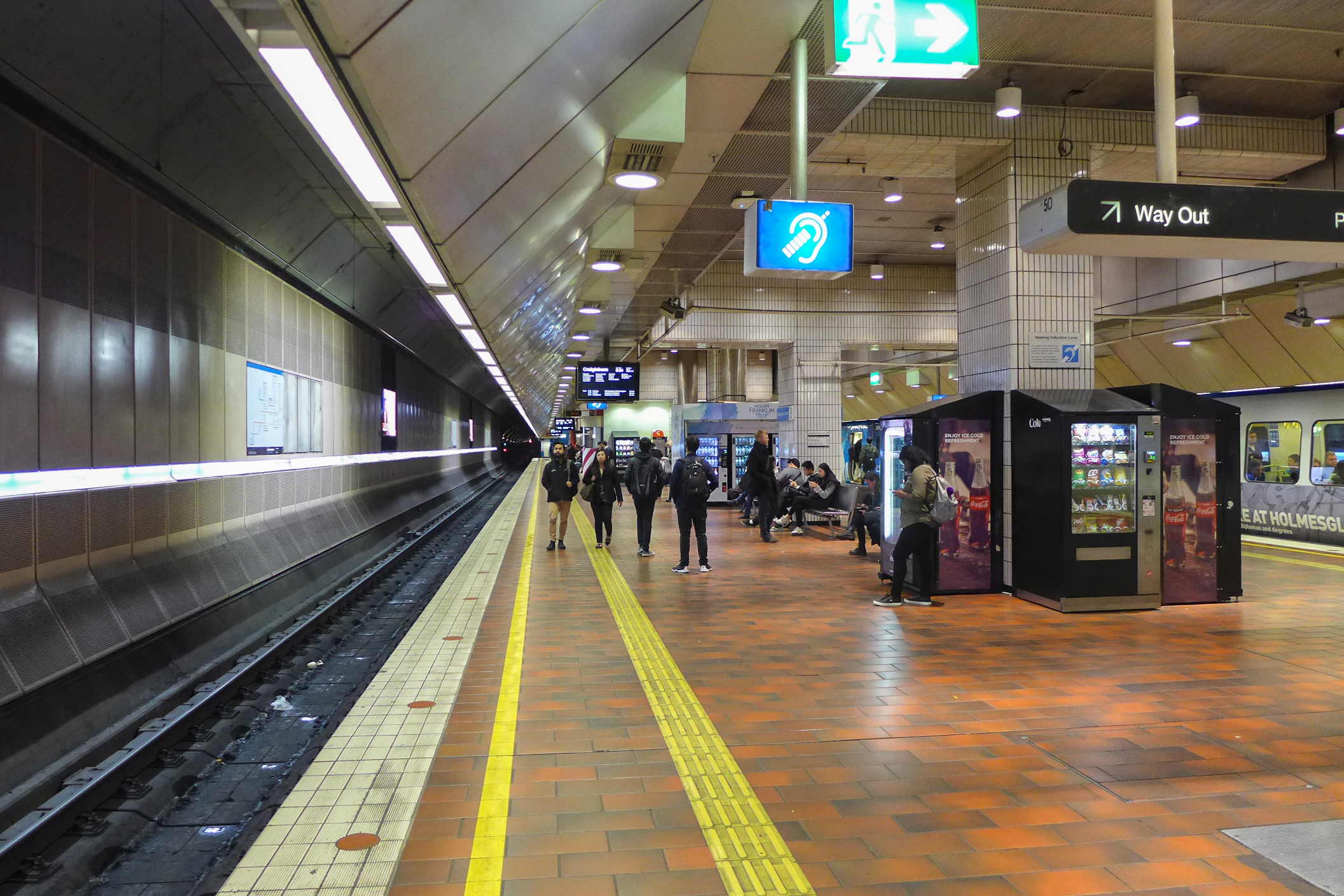
Melbourne Central railway station, 1981

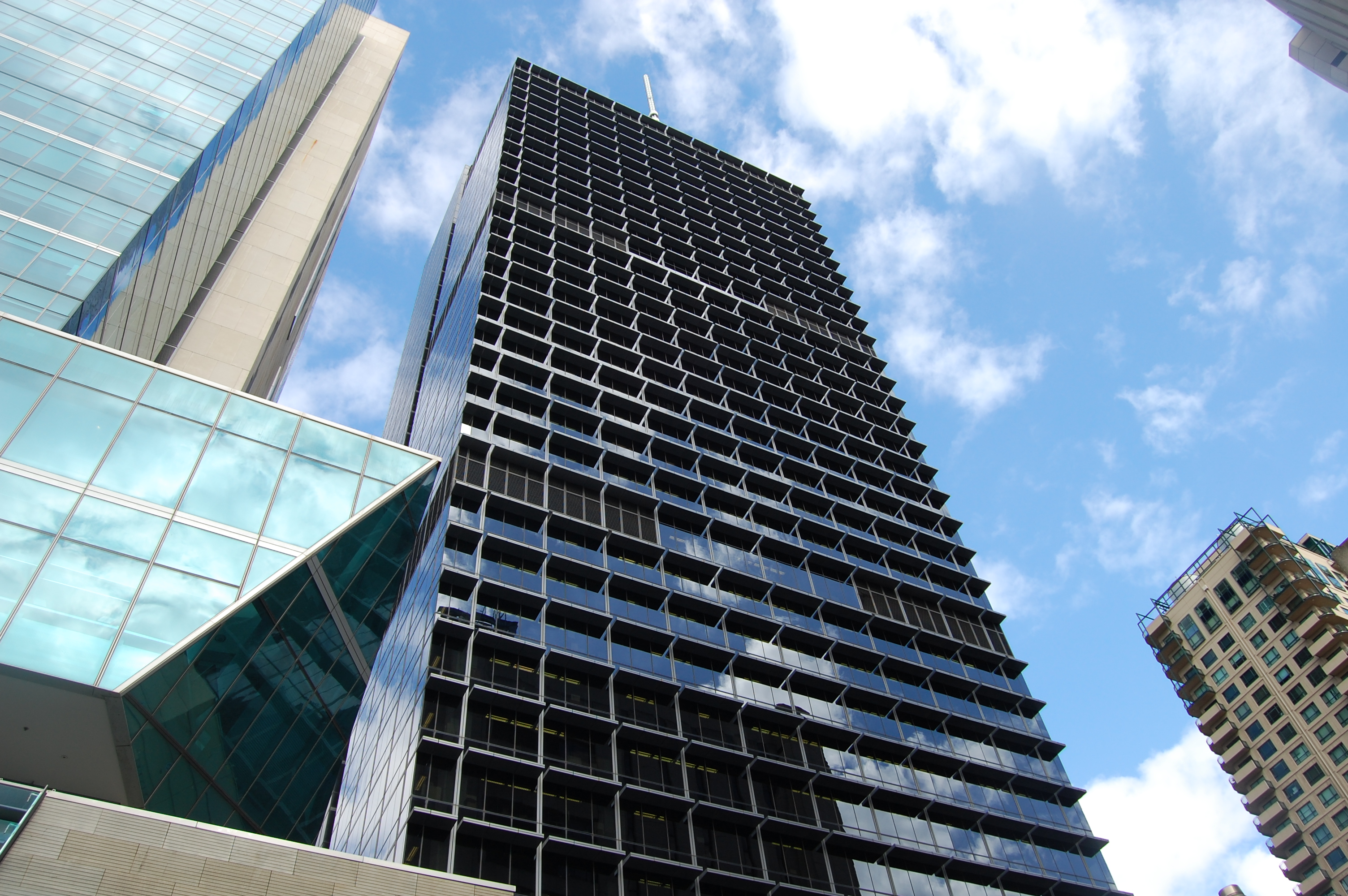
Telstra Corporate Centre, 1992

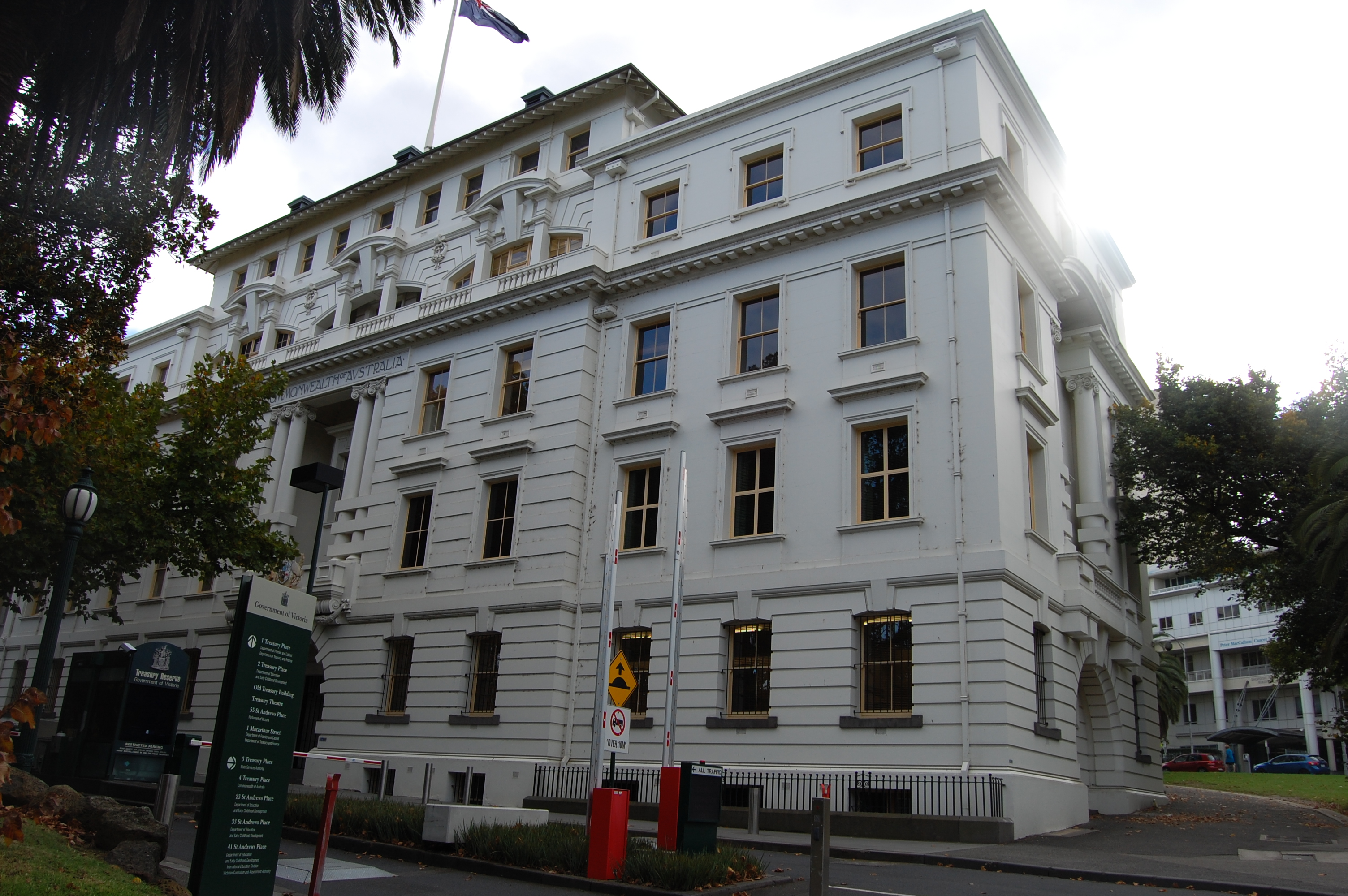
4 Treasury Place, restored 2002

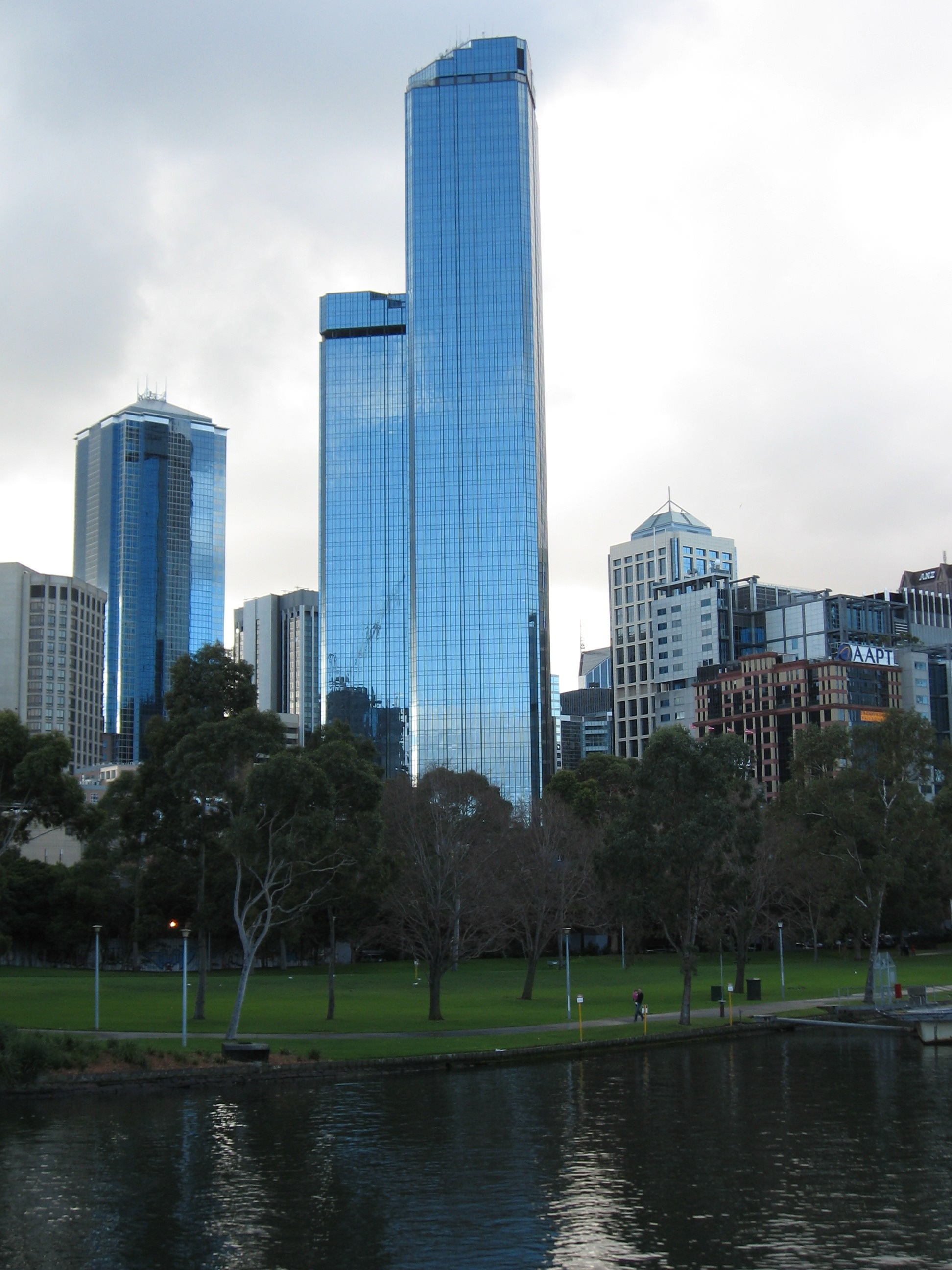
Rialto Towers, 1986
