= Lyon Housemuseum =

Art gallery in Melbourne, Australia

Coordinates: 37.808752°S 145.048782°E

The Lyon Housemuseum is a hybrid residence and contemporary art museum located on Cotham Road, Kew, a suburb of Melbourne, Australia. The Housemuseum displays the Lyon Collection of Australian contemporary art in a purpose designed building.

The building is open to the public for pre-booked guided tours, school visits and other events on designated days each year.

The Housemuseum also hosts a series of public talks and lectures on contemporary art, architecture, art history and museology which are open to the public. The annual Housemuseum Lecture is published in the form of a small book. The first book in this series, Meaning in Space by Leon van Schaik, was published in 2011.

== Collection ==
The Lyon Collection has been developed by Melbourne collectors Corbett Lyon and Yueji Lyon since 1990. It represents key aspects of Australian contemporary art practice from the early 1990s to the present. It comprises over 350 artworks including paintings, sculpture, installation works, photography and video work. There are more than 50 artists currently represented in the Collection including internationally recognised Australian artists Howard Arkley, Patricia Piccinini, ], Brook Andrew, Shaun Gladwell, and Matthew Sleeth.

== Housemuseum design ==
The Housemuseum building was designed by architect Corbett Lyon and his architectural firm Lyons between 2003 and 2005. The building was completed in November 2008 and opened to the public with its first exhibition in 2009.

Inspired by visits he had made as a student to the Sir John Soane's Museum in London and the Peggy Guggenheim Collection in Venice, Lyon designed the new building to explore the relationship between art and living and to contest conventional ideas of public and private space.

The design juxtaposes museum spaces with domestic spaces to create a blurring of conventional readings of museum and house, and creates a scenographic setting for the display of works from the Collection.

The interior of the building is lined with timber panels which are printed with words and texts created by the family. The exterior of the building is clad in black zinc.

The front fence displays the two street names of the building's corner address. These are rendered in 2 metre high letters using decorative corbelled brickwork.

In 2010 the Housemuseum won the Australian Institute of Architects' Harold Desbrowe-Annear Award, Victoria's highest design award for residential architecture. Also in 2010 the Housemuseum was cited by Larry's List as 'one of the world's 10 most exciting buildings of private museums'.

== New Housemuseum Galleries ==
An extension to the Housemuseum has been completed (2019) on an adjacent site.

The new building, the Housemuseum Galleries, includes large, flexible exhibition spaces to showcase works from the Lyon Collection and to present international and local exhibitions of contemporary art, architecture and design. The new Galleries are managed by the Lyon Foundation, a not-for-profit public art museum entity established in 2012 by the museum's founding patrons, Corbett Lyon and Yueji Lyon.

== Bibliography ==
- The Lyon Housemuseum and Lyon Collection Visitor Guide. (2016). Melbourne, Australia: Lyon Housemuseum. ISBN 978-0-994-4414-0-9.
- Carter, Paul (2015). Metabolism: The Exhibition of the Unseen. Melbourne, Australia: Lyon Housemuseum. ISBN 978-0-9871320-4-8.
- Papastergiadis, Nikos (2013). Ambient Perspective. Melbourne, Australia: Lyon Housemuseum. ISBN 978-0-9871320-1-7.
- van Schaik, Leon (2011). Meaning in Space - Housing the Visual Arts, or Architectures for Private Collections. Melbourne, Australia: Lyon Housemuseum. ISBN 978-0-9871320-0-0.
- Anderson, Jaynie, (2016) Unconstrained Passions - The Architect's House as a Museum. Melbourne, Australia: Lyon Housemuseum. ISBN 978-0-9871320-5-5.
