= One Queensbridge =

Proposed skyscraper in Melbourne

Coordinates: 37.822075°S 144.961639°E

The One
- Alternative names: 1 Queens Bridge

General information
- Status: Redevelopment proposed
- Type: Hotel and Condominium
- Location: 1–29 Queensbridge Street, Melbourne, Australia; Australia
- Cost: AUD$1.5 billion

Height
- Roof: 240 m (790 ft)

Technical details
- Floor count: 71
- Floor area: 300,736 m^{2} (3,237,095 sq ft)
More information
Design and construction
Architect	WilkinsonEyre
Developer	Schiavello Group, Crown Limited (original); PDG (current)
Other information
Number of rooms	708 (residential); 388 (hotel)
Parking	1,148
Website
http://onequeensbridge.com.au/

One Queensbridge (or Crown Queensbridge) was a proposed mixed–used supertall skyscraper to be located in the Southbank precinct of Melbourne, Australia. The skyscraper would have become the tallest building in Melbourne, surpassing the height of Australia 108, and the tallest building in Australia, eclipsing the height of Q1. In addition to being the tallest, the development would have been one of the biggest single–building projects in Australia, encompassing 300,376 square metres (3,233,220 square feet) of floor area.

Proposed by Crown Limited and the Schiavello Group, the $1.75 billion skyscraper would have reached 323.6 metres (1,062 feet) in height, and comprised a six–star hotel of 388 rooms, in conjunction with 708 residential apartments, over 90 levels. Additionally, a footbridge was to link the project to the Crown Casino and Entertainment Complex, across Queensbridge Street. Construction was originally expected to commence in 2018, and was estimated to be completed in five to six years. However, due to slowing residential apartment market conditions and an inability to obtain financing for the project, construction was unable to commence prior to expiration of the project's planning permit. This has allowed for a rethink on what Melbourne needs with the heritage queens bridge hotel gaining new found acclaim.

== Site ==
One Queensbridge was to be built on the amalgamated site 1–29 Queensbridge Street, in the Southbank precinct of Melbourne. The site, with an area of approximately 5,059 square metres (54,455 square feet), is adjacent on either side to Freshwater Place, a 205 metres (673 feet) tall residential skyscraper completed in 2005, and Prima Pearl, a 254 metres (833 feet) tall residential skyscraper completed in 2014. Directly across from the Queensbridge site, is Crown Melbourne.

The subject site is currently occupied by four buildings, of commercial use and each between three and six levels in height, at the addresses of 1–7, 9–15, 17–23, and 25–29 Queensbridge Street. Prior to the acquisition of the sites, 25-29 Queensbridge Street was subject to plans for a 71–storey residential building, proposed in 2012. Named The Falls, the skyscraper would have reached a height of 237 metres (778 feet) and comprise over 500 apartments. Despite its approval in August 2012, the skyscraper did not proceed to construction.

From 1899 to 1914, 1–7 Queensbridge Street was occupied by the Fall's Bridge Hotel, and at the time, it had a Moray Street address (which would later be renamed Queensbridge Street). In 1914, the hotel was renamed to the Queen's Bridge Hotel; however, it was considered a deathtrap, and in 1926 a new building was erected for A£17,000. A $12 million redevelopment of the Hotel saw it converted into a nightclub in October 1999, and it was renamed to QBH. Over the next decade, the nightclub maintained popularity but also notoriety, having been the scene of violence and brawls; this resulted in the club's patron limit cut down from 2,200, to 1,500. By the late 2000s, the QBH was closed–down, and the site was placed on the market. The Schiavello Group purchased the site in 2010, and has used the former hotel as a Schiavello Furniture showroom.

== Development history ==
Having purchased the 1 Queensbridge site in 2010, the Schiavello Group in conjunction with Bates Smart architectural firm, proposed a residential skyscraper on the site in 2011. Initially, the building was to rise to a height of 276 metres (906 feet), and contain 71 levels. The $275 million development, designed by Bates Smart, would comprise 592 residential apartments and 566 car parking spaces. In April 2012, then-Minister for Planning, Matthew Guy, approved the skyscraper project; had it been constructed, it would have been the second–tallest building in Melbourne, behind the Eureka Tower, which stands at 297 metres (974 feet) in height.

However, by July 2014, a deal was brokered between Schiavello Group and by Crown Limited (owner of the nearby Crown Casino and Entertainment Complex) that would see both companies participate in a joint development. Plans were later resubmitted to the State Government as to accommodate 626 apartments, a 400–room five–star hotel, a sky lounge, as well as a footbridge across Queensbridge Street joining the development to Crown casino. The height of the project was increased to 308 metres (1,010 feet), and would now comprise 84 levels. The development would have been named the "Queensbridge Tower".

=== Approved design ===
In October 2015, plans were revised, as to allow for a skyscraper of 313 metres (1,027 feet) in height, a six–star hotel with 388 rooms, and 680 residential apartments, across 90 levels; Nevertheless, by May 2016, plans submitted to the State Government revealed a further increase in height to 323.6 metres (1,062 feet) – approximately two metres below the height limit imposed by the Civil Aviation Safety Authority. The number of residential apartments was boosted to 708, whilst the number of 6–star hotel rooms remained at 388, and the footbridge across Queensbridge Street joining the development to Crown casino was preserved in the plans. Additionally, access to the 90th–level would have been open to the public, which was to include function space, bars, and gardens. London–based architectural firm WilkinsonEyre joined the project, after their design of One Queensbridge was chosen at an international design competition for the development in 2015. WilkinsonEyre previously collaborated with Crown Limited, having designed the Crown Sydney skyscraper currently under construction in Barangaroo, Sydney.

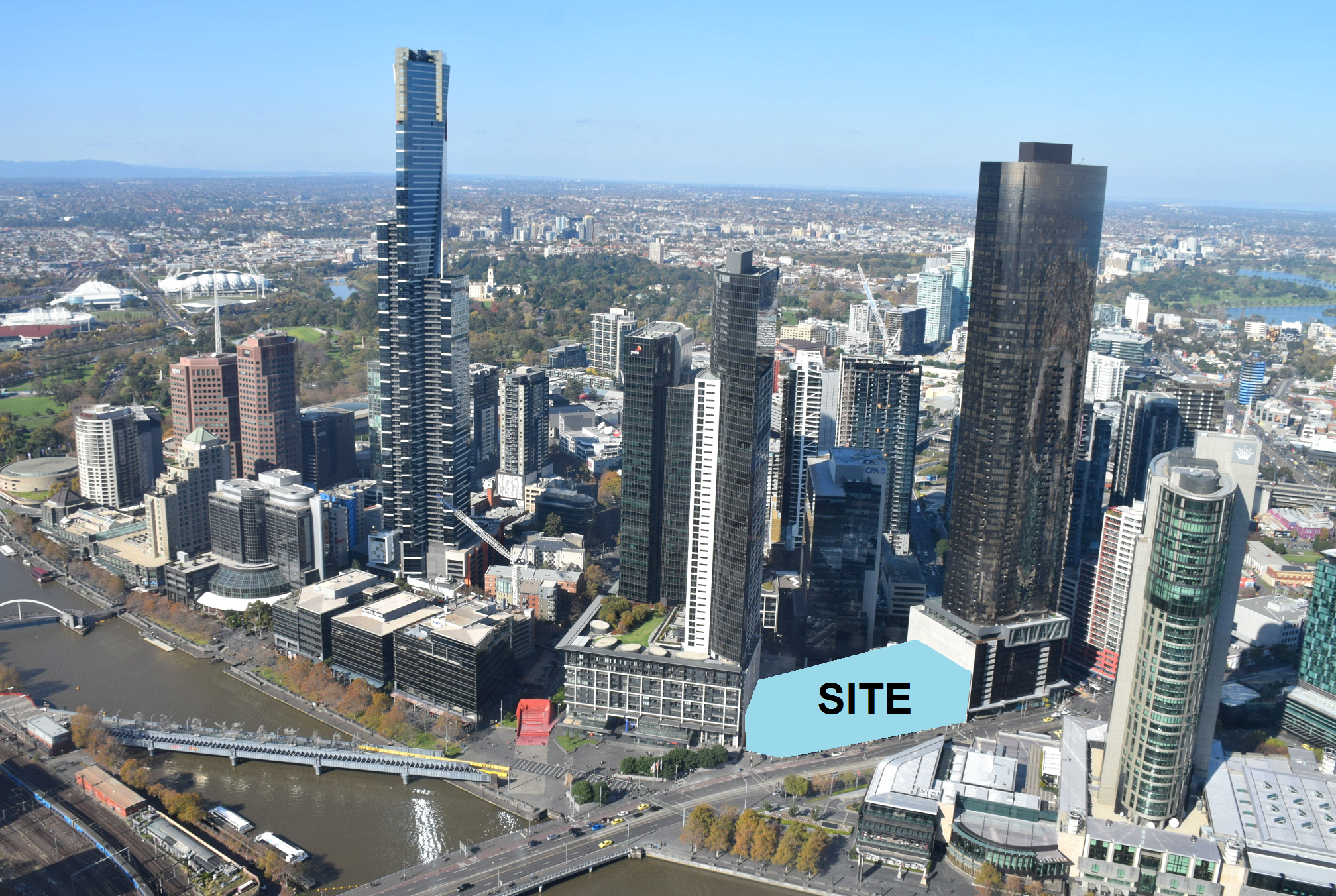
The site of One Queensbridge, as indicated in blue. Freshwater Place and Prima Pearl stand either side the development

The development —now referred to as "One Queensbridge"— required approval for construction by the State Government; approval it received by the Planning Minister, Richard Wynne, in February 2017.

A condition of the skyscraper's approval stipulated that $100 million of the developers' would be allocated towards a community benefits package, which would see upgrades to Queensbridge Square and the Sandridge Bridge. The Square would have seen landscaping and two new cafes, where as the former railway bridge would have undergone a $15 million redevelopment, that would have turned it into the likes of the High Line park, in Manhattan, New York. Furthermore, Southbank Boulevard would have benefited from the package, with improvements including a new bike strip.

The project eclipsed one of the Government's planning restrictions introduced in 2015, that limits skyscrapers from exceeding a floor area plot ratio of 24:1 (that is, buildings cannot exceed 24 times the block of land it is built on), and is more than three times the Government's 2016 proposal of 18:1 plot ratio. One Queensbridge, with a floor space of 300,736 square metres (3,237,095 square feet), has a plot ratio of 56:1; nevertheless, the development met a key provision of the policy – "State significance" as outlined to the Planning Minister, and hence, it was exempt from the planning law. According to Crown Limited, the $1.75 billion project would have created an estimated 1,200 direct and 1,680 indirect construction jobs over five years, as well as 1,050 permanent jobs following its completion. The skyscraper could have taken up to five to six years to build, with an expected commencement of construction in 2018.

However, due to a dramatically slowing residential apartment market, as well as an inability to secure financing for the massive project, construction on the tower was unable to commence prior to the expiration of its planning permit, with the site's use and future now unknown. In the absence of renewal of the project's permit, it is likely a revised or redesigned project will be put forward by the developers at a later period.

Upon completion, the skyscraper would have become the tallest building in Melbourne, surpassing the height of Australia 108, a supertall skyscraper which stands 316.7 metres (1,039 feet) in height. Additionally, One Queensbridge would have become the tallest building in Australia, surpassing the Gold Coast's Q1, which stands 322.5 metres (1,058 feet) in height to its spire.

== Redevelopment ==
In 2024, the Queensbridge site was acquired by Melbourne-based developer PDG for approximately A$85 million.

PDG has proposed a revised mixed-use development for the site, known as The One, comprising a tower of approximately 71 storeys and around 240 metres in height.

Early works on the site commenced in 2025, including demolition, following a delay of more than a decade since the original proposal.

As of 2026, the project remains subject to planning approval.

== See also ==
- List of tallest buildings in Melbourne
