= Multiplex (company) =

Construction contractor

- Type: Private
- Industry: Construction, engineering, infrastructure
- Founded: 1962
- Founder: John Roberts
- Headquarters: London, England
- Key people: John Flecker (CEO)
- Parent: Brookfield Business Partners
- Website: Multiplex.Global

Multiplex is an international construction contractor founded in Australia and currently headquartered in London, England. Operating in Australia, Canada, Europe and the Middle East, the company specializes in high-rise buildings, studio, high-end residential, mixed-use, education, health and civil infrastructure developments. The business is being acquired by Japanese contractor Obayashi Corporation in a deal expected to complete in late 2026.

== History ==
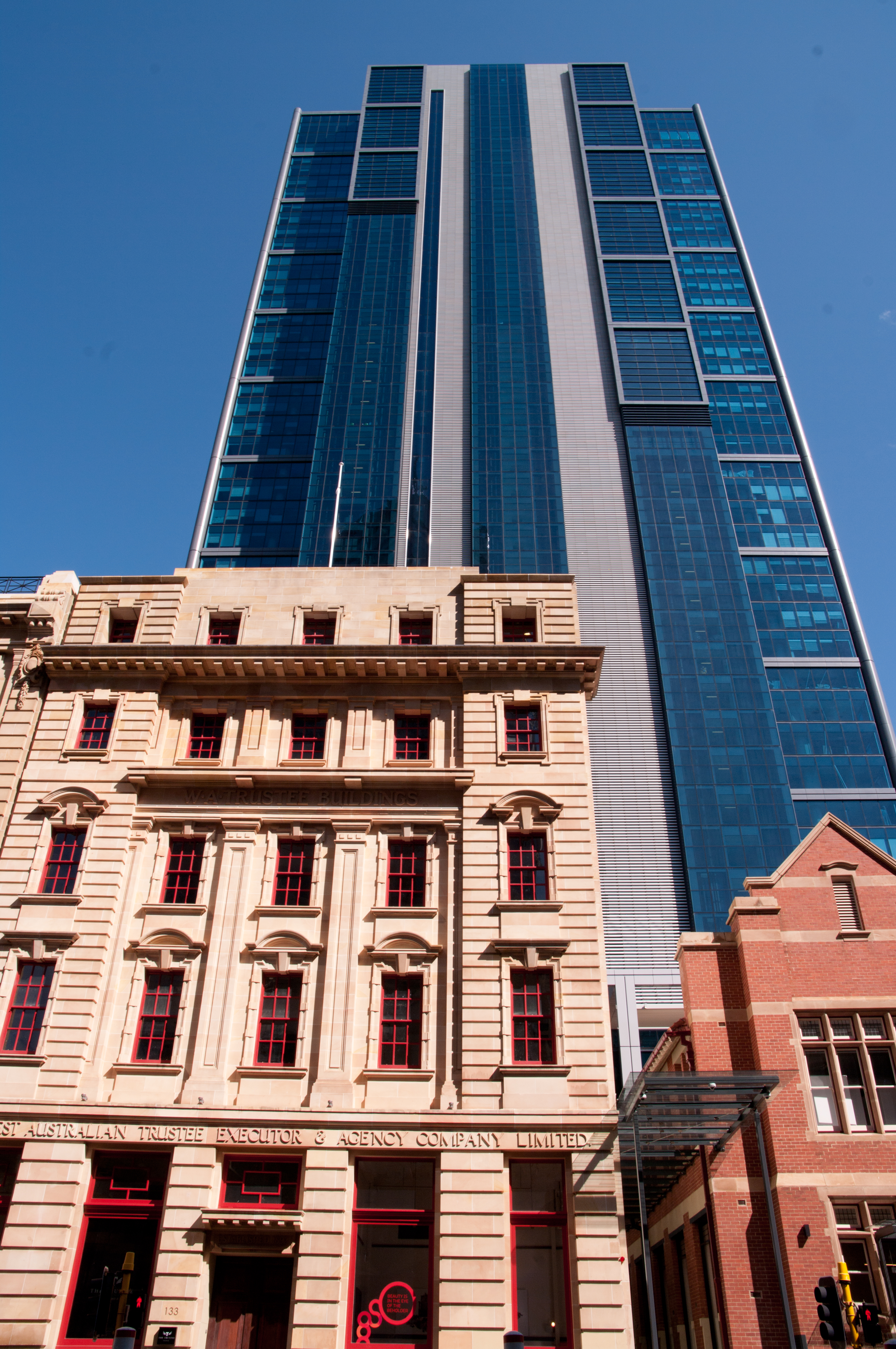
Brookfield Place (Perth) is the second tallest building in Western Australia.

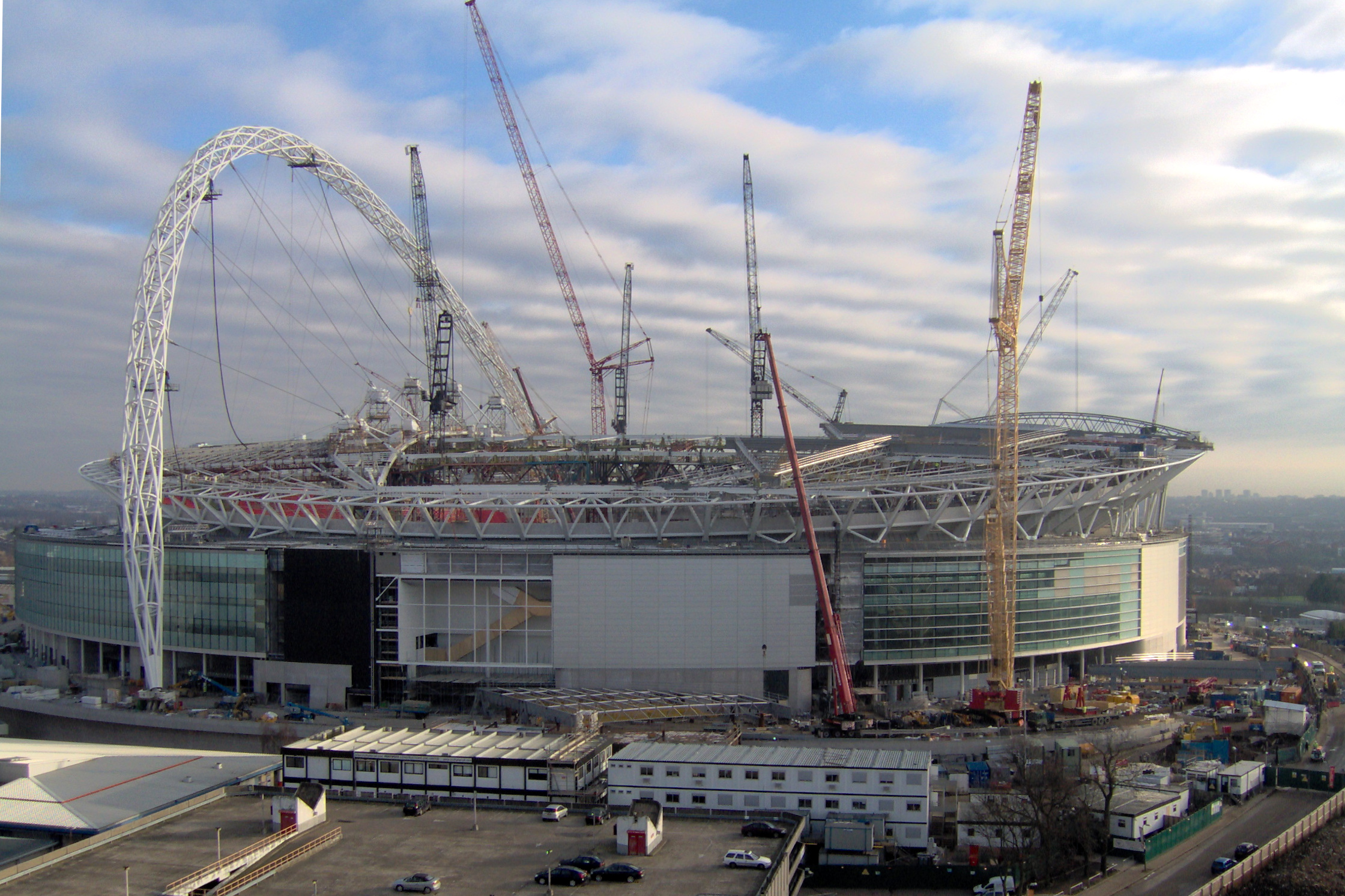
Wembley Stadium under construction

Multiplex was founded in 1962 in Perth, Western Australia by John Roberts.

In December 2003, it listed on the Australian Securities Exchange with the code of MXG, raising a total of A$1.2 billion.

Multiplex announced in late November 2006 that it planned to create a European real-estate fund to increase profits. Multiplex posted a preliminary financial report on 22 February 2007 which announced the group's net profit of A$295.6 million.

In January 2007 Multiplex faced a takeover bid which caused its share price to jump 17%. The A$4.03 billion proposal was never formally made, and the potential bidder remained anonymous.

On 11 June 2007, Brookfield Asset Management proposed an acquisition of Multiplex which valued the company at approximately A$7.3 billion. The offer to shareholders of $5.05 per security was supported by the Multiplex board of directors, including the Roberts family, who sold their 26% ownership of Multiplex to Brookfield. The offer also proved popular with investors, with Brookfield rapidly acquiring 90% ownership of the company by 31 October 2007.

Brookfield acquired the remaining 10% of Multiplex securities and delisted the company from the Australian Securities Exchange in November 2007. Brookfield published a statement to ASX outlining its intentions following the acquisition of Multiplex.

The company rebranded to its original name of Multiplex in 2016, while still remaining a Brookfield company.

In 2020, Multiplex made a pre-tax loss of £158.6m. The company closed its sites in late March 2020, after lockdown was introduced.

In June 2026, Brookfield agreed to sell Multiplex to Japanese contractor Obayashi Corporation for $650m (£492m), with the deal expected to complete in late 2026.

== Operations ==
As of September 2022, Multiplex employed approximately 2,700 people globally.

== Controversies ==
In 2019, legal action was launched against the company by NHS Greater Glasgow and Clyde over problems in the construction and design of the Queen Elizabeth University Hospital. A public inquiry was also launched in 2019, looking at the QEUH and the delayed Royal Hospital for Children and Young People. The inquiry is intended to examine "how serious problems relating to key building systems and infrastructure occurred, and what steps can be taken to prevent these in future projects". In January 2020, NHS Greater Glasgow and Clyde was reported to be seeking £73m in compensation from Multiplex over building problems at QEUH.

In August 2020, Multiplex was identified as the slowest payer among major UK contractors, taking more than 50 days on average to settle its bills.

Multiplex also built the Victopia apartment building in Auckland, New Zealand, which became the subject of New Zealand's largest-ever leaky building claim. Rather than pay fines and deal with the problems created by this and other shoddy building work, Multiplex put their local business into voluntary liquidation and left the New Zealand market.

== Major projects ==
=== Australia ===
- Burswood Casino, Perth completed in 1985
- Tuggeranong Hyperdome, Canberra completed in 1987
- BankWest Tower, Perth completed in 1988
- Central Park, Perth completed in 1992
- Stadium Australia, Sydney completed in 1999
- Citigroup Centre, Sydney, completed in 2000
- Old Swan Brewery, Perth completed in 2001
- Federation Square, Melbourne completed in 2002
- Flinders Wharf, Melbourne completed in 2003
- Perth Convention & Exhibition Centre, Perth completed in 2004
- Gold Coast Convention & Exhibition Centre, Queensland, completed in 2004
- Latitude, Sydney completed in 2005
- Melbourne Convention Centre, Melbourne completed in 2009
- Brookfield Place, Perth, completed in 2012
- Swanston Academic Building, Melbourne, completed in 2012
- Fiona Stanley Hospital, Perth completed in 2013
- Prima Pearl, Melbourne completed in 2014
- 1 William Street, Brisbane completed in 2016
- Crown Towers, Perth completed in 2016
- Perth Stadium, Perth completed in 2018
- Australia 108, Melbourne completed in 2020

=== United Kingdom ===
- Wembley Stadium, London completed in 2007
- Strata SE1, London completed in 2010
- Peterborough City Hospital, England completed in 2010
- The Tower - St George Wharf, London completed in 2014
- Queen Elizabeth University Hospital, Glasgow opened in 2015
- Principal Place, London completed in 2018
- 22 Bishopsgate, London completed in 2020
- 100 Bishopsgate, London completed in 2020
- Royal Hospital for Children and Young People, Edinburgh completed 2021

=== Middle East ===
- Emirates Towers, Dubai completed in 2000
- The Index, Dubai completed in 2011
- Msheireb Downtown Doha Phase 1C, Qatar completed in 2012
- JW Marriott Marquis Dubai completed in 2013

=== New Zealand ===
- Sentinel, North Shore City, completed in 2008
- 80 Queen Street, Auckland completed in 2009
