= Australia 108 =

Residential skyscraper in the Southbank precinct of Melbourne, Victoria, Australia

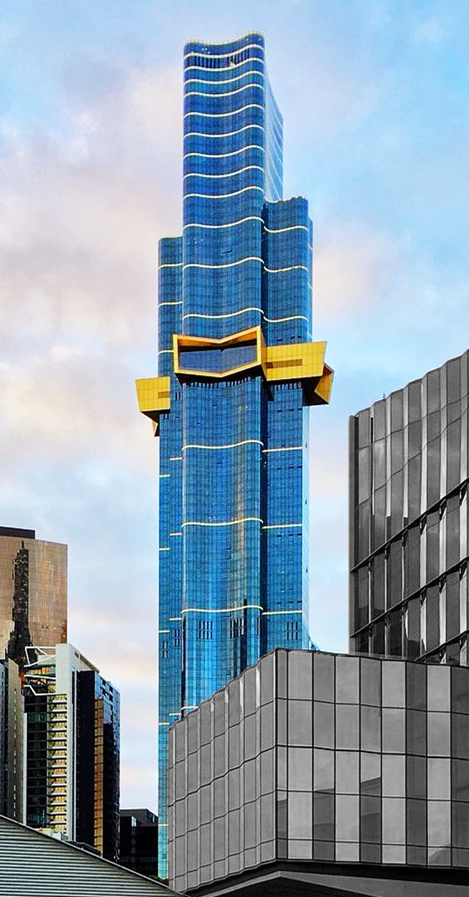
- Australia 108 viewed from east of Southbank, December 2020
- Alternative names: 70 Southbank Boulevard

Record height
- Tallest in Melbourne since 2020^{[I]}
- Preceded by: Eureka Tower

General information
- Status: Completed
- Type: Residential
- Location: 70 Southbank Boulevard, Southbank, Victoria, Australia
- Coordinates: 37°49′24″S 144°57′50″E
- Construction started: October 2015; 11 years ago
- Topped-out: June 2020; 6 years ago
- Completed: September 2020; 6 years ago
- Opened: 2018–2020 (in stages)
- Cost: ~A$900 million

Height
- Architectural: 316.7 m (1,039.0 ft)
- Tip: 318.7 m (1,045.6 ft)
- Top floor: 312.4 m (1,024.9 ft)

Technical details
- Floor count: 100 plus 1 underground
- Lifts/elevators: 11

Design and construction
- Architecture firm: Fender Katsalidis Architects
- Developer: Aspial Corporation
- Services engineer: Norman Disney & Young
- Main contractor: Brookfield Multiplex

Other information
- Number of rooms: 1,105
- Parking: 558

Website
- australia108.com.au

Australia 108 (previously 70 Southbank Boulevard) is a residential supertall skyscraper in the Southbank precinct of Melbourne, Victoria, Australia. Upon officially topping out in June 2020, it became the tallest building in Australia by roof height, surpassing the Eureka Tower, the second-tallest building in Australia by full height (which includes architectural features), surpassed by Q1 Tower, and the tallest building in Melbourne.

The World Class Land development project consists of a 316.7-metre-tall (1,039 ft) apartment building with 1,105 apartments over 100 floors. Construction having commenced in 2015, Australia 108 was completed in 2020 with the main contractor being Brookfield Multiplex and designer Fender Katsalidis Architects.

Prior to its current form, plans were initially for a 72–level residential building with a height of 226 metres (741 ft). In 2012, these plans were revised and resubmitted in favour of a mixed-use residential and hotel skyscraper, reaching 388 metres (1,273 ft) and comprising 108 levels. This proposal was approved by the Government of Victoria in March 2013; however, it was shelved four months later after it struggled to meet conditions imposed by state and federal government authorities including VicRoads and the Civil Aviation Safety Authority.

== Site ==
The 70 Southbank Boulevard site is situated on the corner of City Road and Southbank Boulevard in the Southbank precinct of Melbourne. The land comprised two separately titled buildings, both of which had two levels. The buildings had a total net lettable area of 2,828 square metres (30,440 sq ft), on a land area of 2,642 square metres (28,440 sq ft).

The site was purchased by architecture firm Fender Katsalidis Architects in April 2008, for A$14.2 million, after the original tenancies ran an expression of interest campaign.

== Previous proposals ==
=== First proposal at 70 Southbank Boulevard (2009–2012) ===
In 2009, plans were submitted by Fender Katsalidis Architects to the City of Melbourne for an $400 million residential building to be built on the 70 Southbank Boulevard site. In its original proposal, the building, 70 Southbank Boulevard, was planned to be 226 metres (741 ft) in height and consist of 532 residential apartments, six levels of office space, a fresh food market and other retail amenities, spanning 72 floors. The building was designed to replicate the nearby Eureka Tower, also a Fender Katsalidis development. Nonda Katsalidis noted that his firm "wanted to re-create elements of what we had achieved at Eureka and apply it to 70 Southbank Boulevard" with the Eureka Tower.

The building development was approved by then-Victorian Planning Minister Justin Madden on 21 April 2010, a decision which received backlash from the City of Melbourne council, dubbing the development as "excessively high" and "at odds with the City of Melbourne's height guidelines for the area". In May 2010, the council lodged an appeal to the Victorian Civil and Administrative Tribunal (VCAT) to have the building permit overturned, asserting that the building surpassed the 100-metre (330 ft) height limit in the area's planning scheme. VCAT rejected the appeal and noted that the planning scheme did not specify a maximum height.

Nonetheless, in July 2012, the site was put up for sale through an international public expression of interest campaign and was listed at $25 million. This was to allow the Fender Katsalidis partners time to "go in different directions".

=== Second proposal with 'Australia 108' moniker (2012–2013) ===
In November 2012, Katsalidis revealed revised plans for the building which would have seen it "super-sized" to 388 metres (1,273 ft) in height, with 108 floors. The new proposal integrated the previous plans, but went on to include more residential apartments, a six-star hotel, and a two-storey star-shaped sky lobby with restaurants and bars.

A render for Australia 108, as initially proposed in 2012

The residential section of the skyscraper would have comprised 646 apartments, throughout levels 13 to 81. This included a penthouse apartment on levels 80 and 81. Meanwhile, the hotel aspect of the skyscraper would have occupied levels 83 to 102 and feature 288 rooms. A prominent component of this proposal was its star-shaped sky lobby on the 83rd and 84th floors, which would have protruded 9 metres (30 ft) outside of the building, in similar vein to the Eureka Tower's Edge experience, only larger. The Commonwealth Star on the Flag of Australia was used as inspiration for the "starburst". Another design feature was the use of two metal-cladded beacon towers atop the skyscraper's roof. Whilst Australia 108's main roof would have terminated at level 104, the two beacons of varying heights –the taller rising to 388 metres (1,273 ft) above ground– would have comprised levels 105 to 108. A cantilevered 'skybar' forming level 108, was to be hoisted between the beacons at approximately 350 metres (1,150 ft) above ground.

Fender Katsalidis Architects incorporated the Chinese system of geomancy, known as Feng shui, when developing the new proposal. The building's name, height and top floor all contain the number 8, which "relates to prosperity, abundance and security".

The new proposal was subjected to a second planning application process for approval. On 5 March 2013, the City of Melbourne council voted to oppose the development, citing it as an "over-development of the site". The Lord Mayor of Melbourne, Robert Doyle, a Shrine of Remembrance trustee, argued that the building would exceed the council's planning scheme in the area by almost 300 metres (980 ft) and it could potentially create a 1.7 kilometres (1.1 mi) shadow over the Shrine of Remembrance. However, the Shrine's CEO, Denis Baguley, believed otherwise, stating, "I don't believe there are issues of overshadowing that will concern us." VCAT had already approved the project, but the final decision was up to Victorian Planning Minister Matthew Guy.

Despite concerns, the project received its final approval on 18 March 2013 by Guy, who went on to describe the development as "a magnificent addition to Melbourne's skyline. Australia 108 will be a signature development that will define Melbourne for decades to come."

The project was put on the market on 20 April 2013.

Construction on the $1 billion development was to have commenced in 2014, and would have taken three to four years to build, with completion around 2018. The construction was expected to have created 300 jobs in construction and hospitality industries. Upon completion, Australia 108 would have become the tallest building in Australia – surpassing The Gold Coast's Q1 Tower at 323 metres (1,060 ft) and Melbourne's Eureka Tower at 297 metres (974 ft) – and would have therefore been the tallest building in the Southern Hemisphere, and the only such building to have over 100 floors.

In April 2013, it was reported that Australia 108 would have infringed on federal regulations protecting aircraft safety, known as PANS-OPS, particularly in regard to aircraft departing and arriving at Essendon Airport, located some 13 kilometres (8.1 mi) to the north of the project site. At the time, it was claimed that the tower would have extended 13 metres (43 ft) into Essendon Airport's flight path "envelope," whose southerly approach requires a 373-metre (1,224 ft) height limit to any potential obstruction within 15 kilometres (9.3 mi) of the airfield. When asked about this situation, architect Nonda Katsilidis claimed that the flight paths would not be a problem, and that a technical solution could be drawn up if required. He also stressed that any design changes would be "minimal".

Despite this, the project (in its original form) was officially shelved in July 2013, following its inability to meet a "hybrid of requirements" from authorities such as VicRoads, and the Australian Civil Aviation Safety Authority which stated that there was "no flexibility" to approve a building that breached height restrictions. Consequently, Planning Minister Guy held talks with Deputy Prime Minister Warren Truss, regarding the height restrictions on inner city buildings.

== Final iteration (2013–present) ==
=== Planning, design, and approval ===
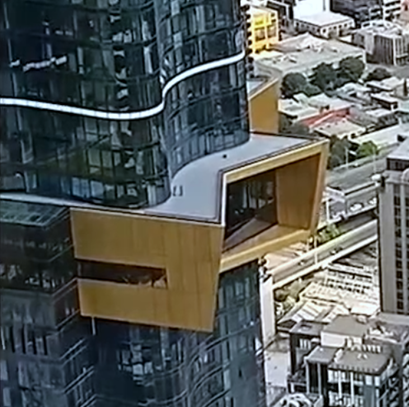
The "starburst" occupying levels 69 to 71 of Australia 108, as viewed from the Melbourne Skydeck, Eureka Tower, April 2021

The project was bought for approximately $30 million by Singapore developer Aspial Corporation, during late 2013. Plans were later resubmitted to the Department of Planning in 2014, for a new proposal; a 100-storey, 317-metre (1,040 ft)-tall apartment tower, to comprise 1,105 apartments (a gain of 500 from the previous proposal). The hotel from the superseded design was removed from the plans, making the project solely residential. The star-shaped sky lobby feature from the previous proposal was incorporated in the design of the building, albeit with various purposes (as opposed to a public observation), and would be located on levels 69 through to 71.

Floor plan
Key: Residential/Amenities · Mixed-use · Mechanical · Misc.
Level(s)	Height	Function	Diagram ref.	Diagram
Roof	316.675 m (1,038.96 ft)	—	S	
100	312.375 m (1,024.85 ft)	Sky Lounge	R	
98–99	303.175 m (994.67 ft)	Plant	Q	
96–97	296.775 m (973.67 ft)	Nova	P	
95	293.575 m (963.17 ft)	Stellar	O	
87–94	267.975 m (879.18 ft)	Stellar Rise	N	
72–86	220.35 m (722.9 ft)	Star Rise	M	
71	217.15 m (712.4 ft)	Plant/Mezzanine	L	
70	213.95 m (701.9 ft)	Sky Lobby	K	
69	210.75 m (691.4 ft)	Outrigger/Plant	J	
68	207.7 m (681 ft)	Outrigger/BMU	I	
44–67	134.5 m (441 ft)	Sky Rise 2	H	
42–43	128.4 m (421 ft)	Outrigger/Plant	G	
14–41	43 m (141 ft)	Sky Rise 1	F	
12–13	38 m (125 ft)	Outrigger/Plant	E	
11	34.8 m (114 ft)	Recreation	D	
1–10	5 m (16 ft)	Car park	C	
Ground	0 m (0 ft)	—	B	
Basement	−2.3 m (−7.5 ft)	Basement 1	A	

Approval for this proposal was granted by Minister Guy on 25 June 2014.

==== Launch ====
Australia 108 was launched to the public on 14 February 2015, having already secured up to 300 buyers during a soft pre-launch period. Less than a month following its launch, 1,000 of the 1,105 apartments had been sold. This includes the sale of the penthouse spread across the 100th floor – the "tallest" home in the southern hemisphere. It was sold for $25 million, an Australian record at the time, to a businessman based in China. By July 2015, almost all of the apartments were sold and in October 2015 only 33 apartments remained on the market. The cheaper apartments on the lower storeys sold for $450,000.

=== Construction and completion ===
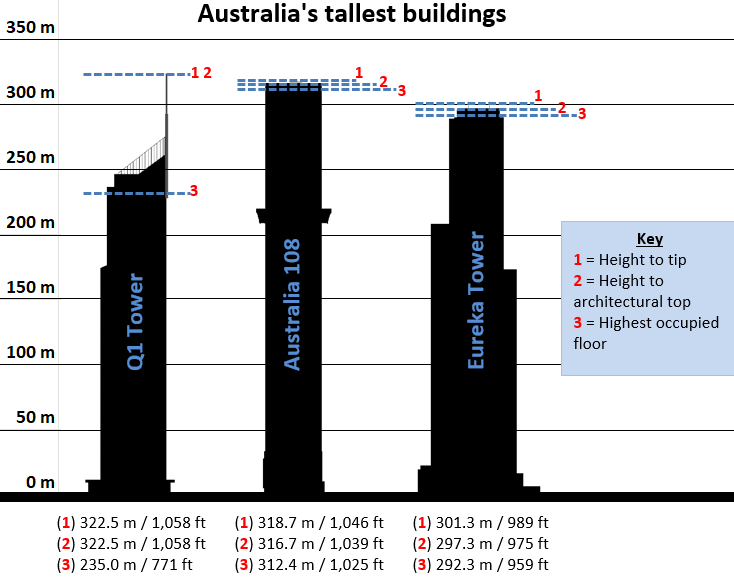
Australia 108, in between Q1 Tower (left) and Eureka Tower (right).

The initial aspect of the construction phase, demolition and site preparation, was completed in early 2015. Construction on the $900 million residential skyscraper itself, commenced in October 2015, with work on the skyscraper's foundation having concluded in July 2016. In September 2015, Aspial Corporation announced their formal appointment of Brookfield Multiplex as the main contractor of Australia 108. Kone, an international engineering and service company, secured an order to supply 13 elevators to Australia 108 in March 2016. By April 2018, the building's core reached its 50th level – marking the halfway point of the skyscraper.

The skyscraper was completed in 2020 and underwent construction in 5 stages:

Stages	Description	Completion
1	up to level 40; 491 apartments	late 2018
2	up to level 56; 252 apartments	mid 2019
3	up to level 66; 162 apartments	mid 2019
4	up to level 86; 120 apartments	early 2020
5	up to final level (100); 80 apartments	mid 2020

In June 2020, the skyscraper had topped-out at level 100, and by late 2020 construction concluded. Upon completion, Australia 108 claimed the following height distinctions from Eureka Tower: the tallest building in Melbourne and the tallest building in Australia to roof. Additionally, it became the second–tallest building in Australia overall, surpassed by Q1 Tower on the Gold Coast. The latter skyscraper reaches 322.5 metres (1,058 ft) in height via its spire, which is included in the first method (height to architectural top) and third method (height to tip) of ranking the heights of tall buildings according to the Council on Tall Buildings and Urban Habitat (CTBUH). Nonetheless, Australia 108 is ranked the tallest building in Australia based on the second CTBUH method (highest occupied floor), with its highest occupied floor at 312.4 metres (1,025 ft) – compared to the second tallest, Eureka Tower at 292.3 metres (959 ft), and Q1 Tower at 235 metres (771 ft). Furthermore, Australia 108 is the Southern Hemisphere's only building with at least 100 floors, and only the second residential skyscraper in the world to comprise at least 100 floors, after the Princess Tower in Dubai.

== Gallery ==
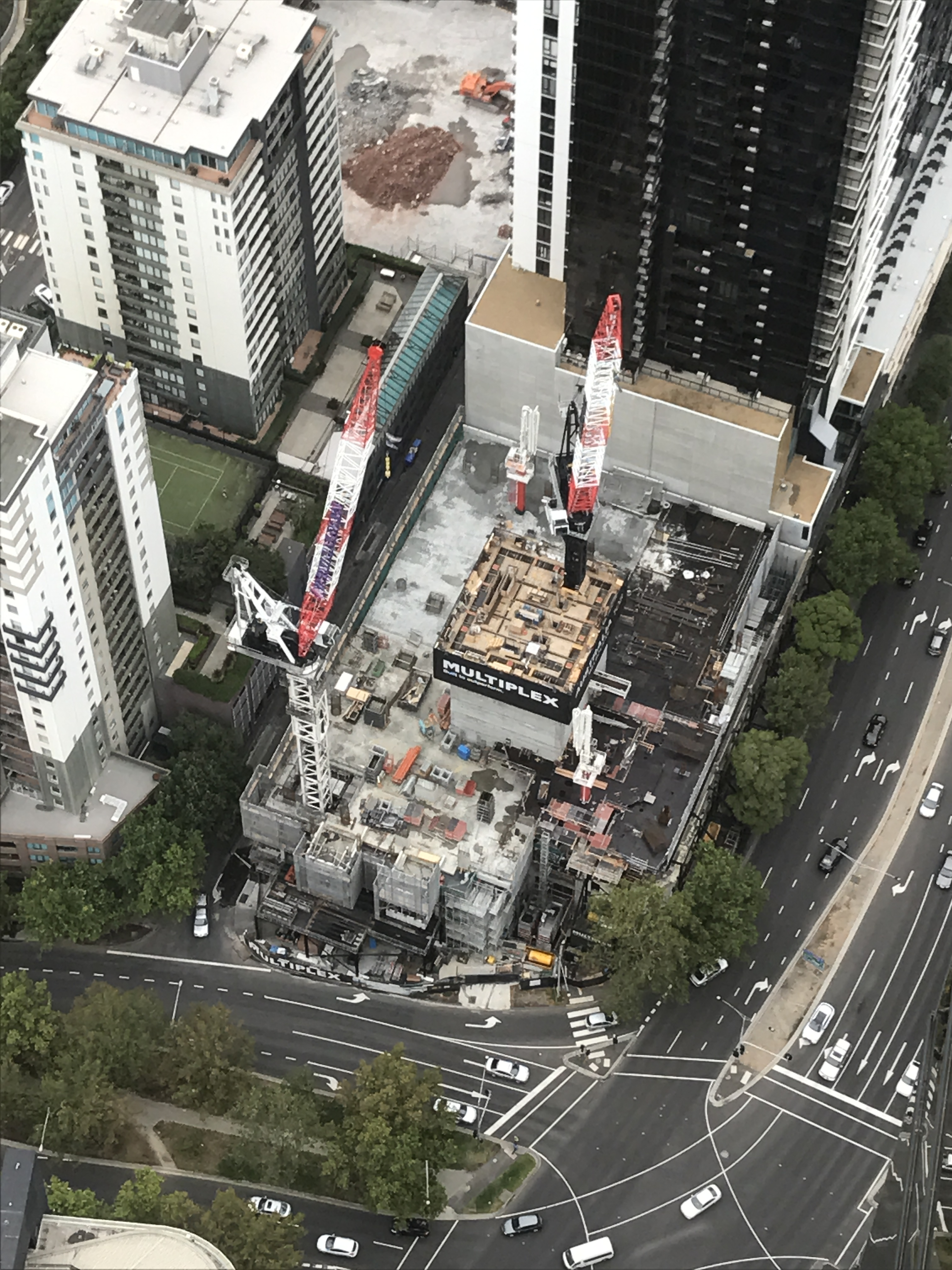
Approximately a year into construction, Australia 108 in February 2017, as viewed from the Eureka Skydeck

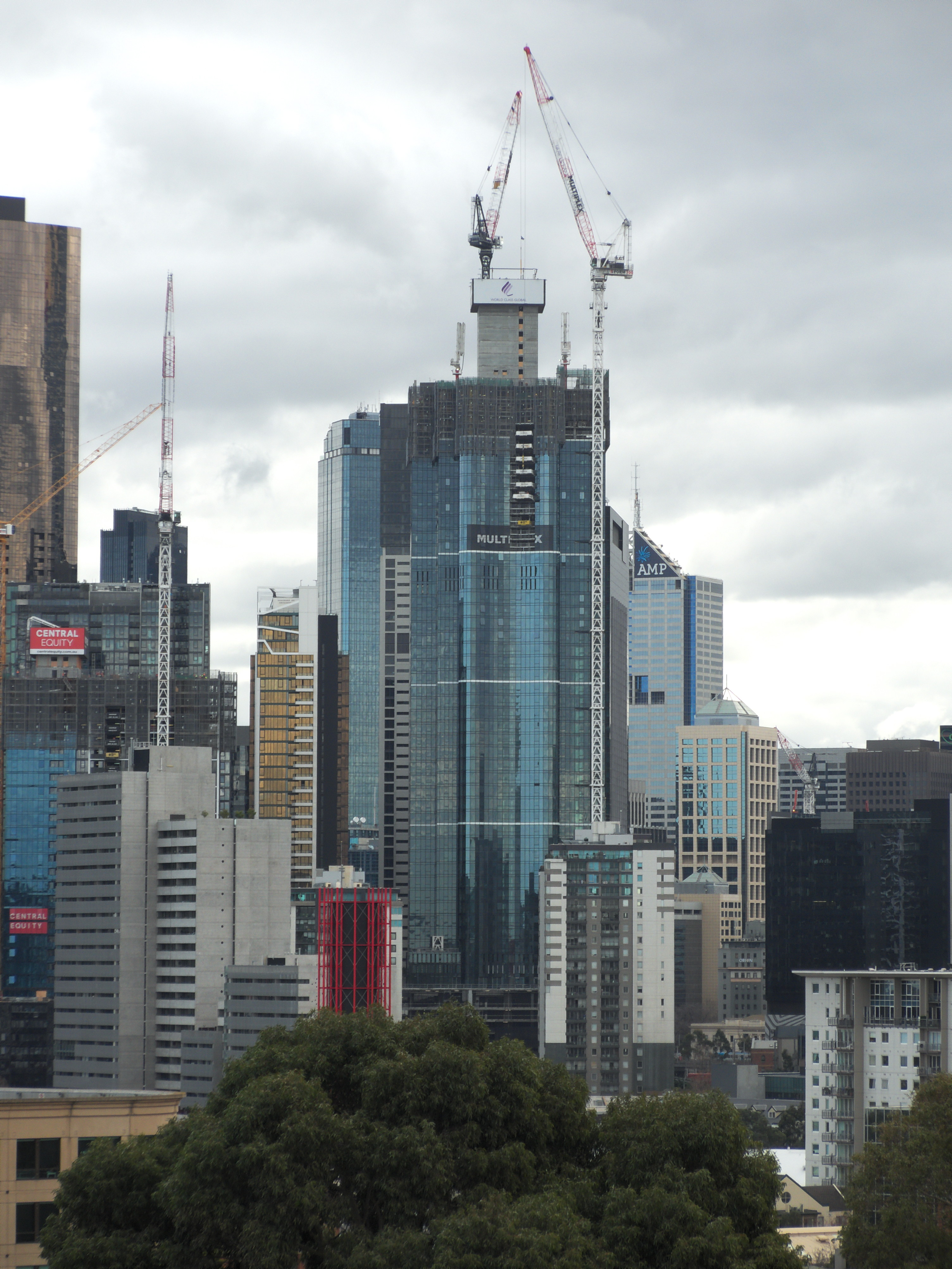
Australia 108 under construction in July 2018; a few months earlier, construction reached level 50.

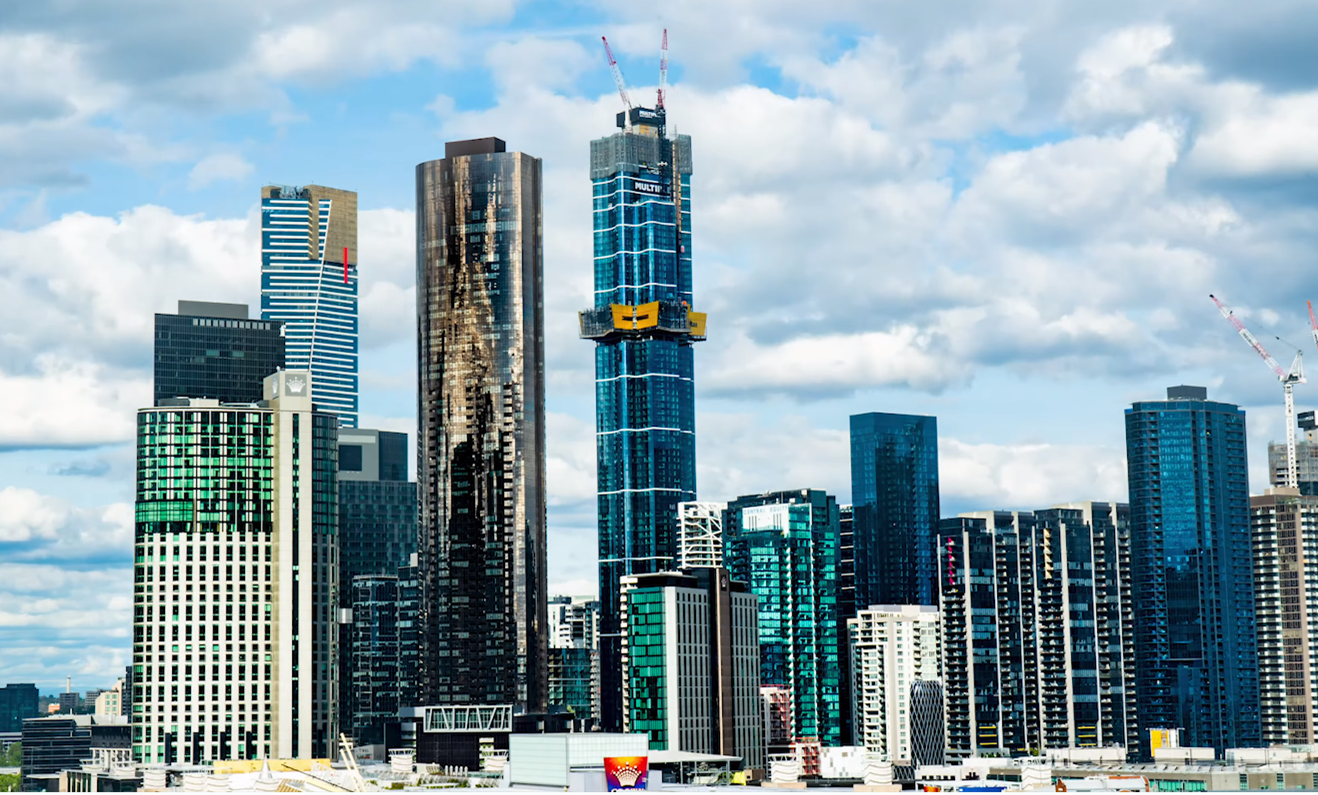
Australia 108 (centre) under construction in November 2019, alongside Prima Pearl, Eureka Tower, and other prominent buildings on the Southbank skyline

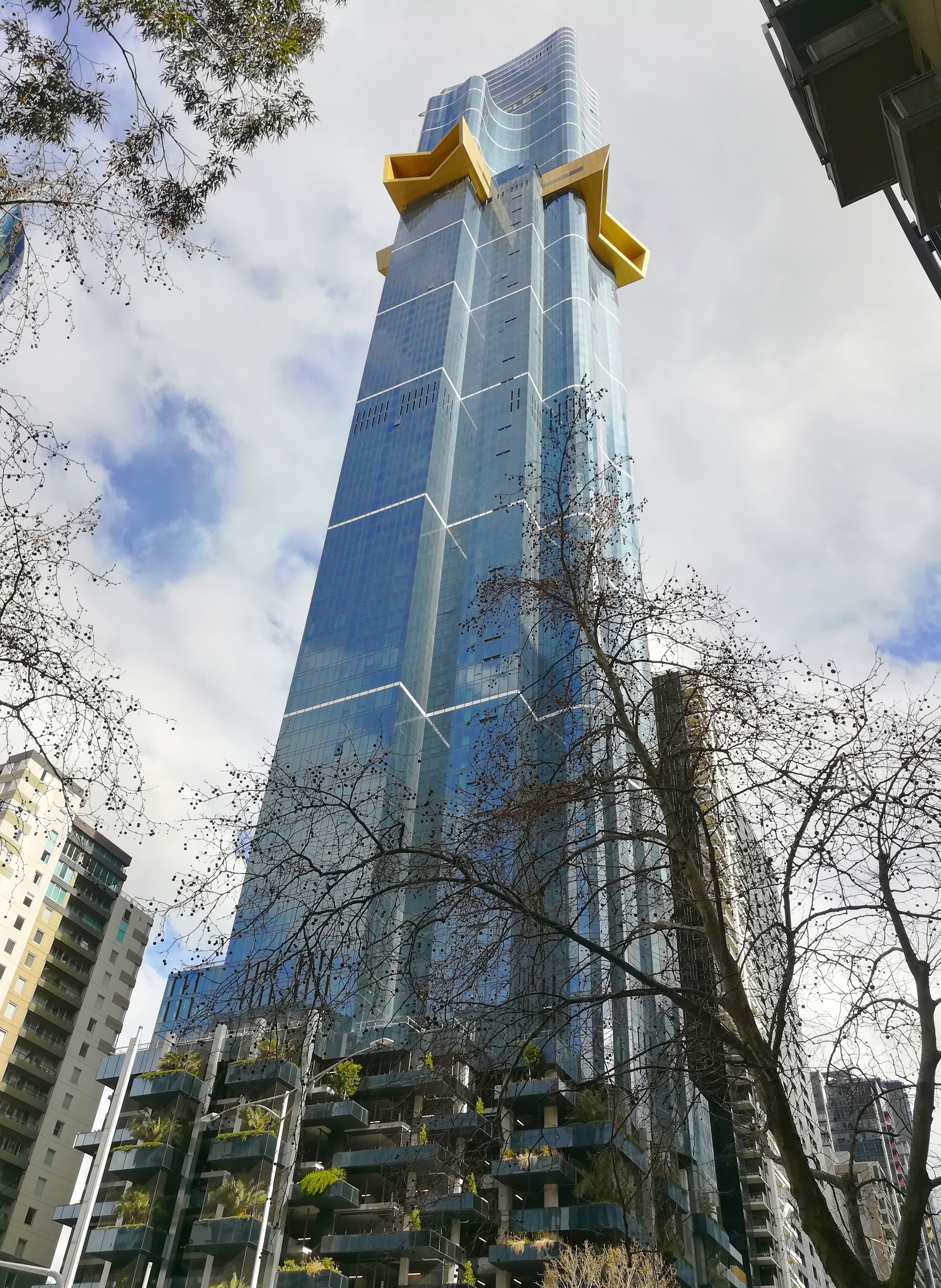
A ground-level view of Australia 108, completed in September 2020

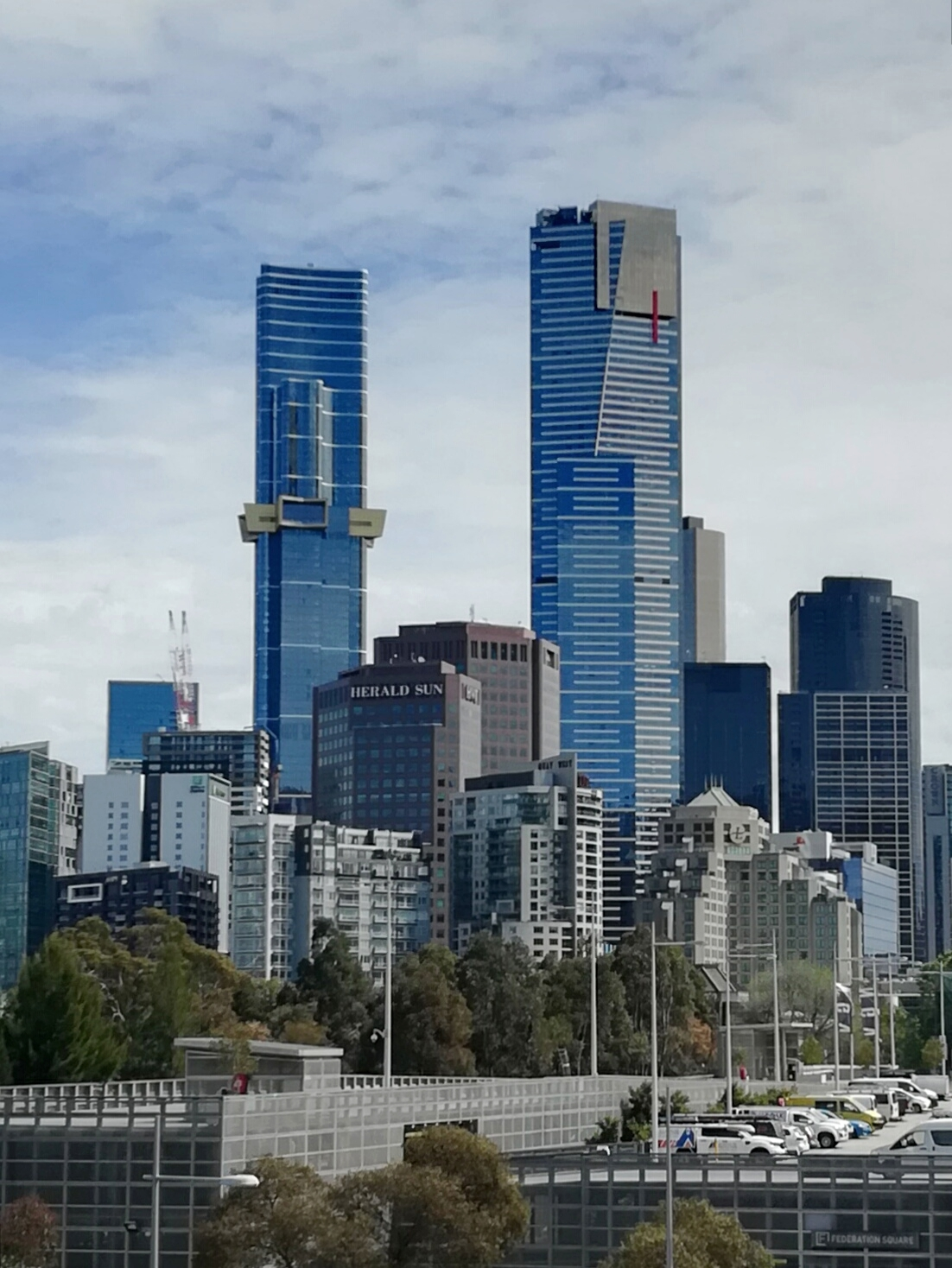
Australia 108 (left) and Eureka Tower (right) in October 2021

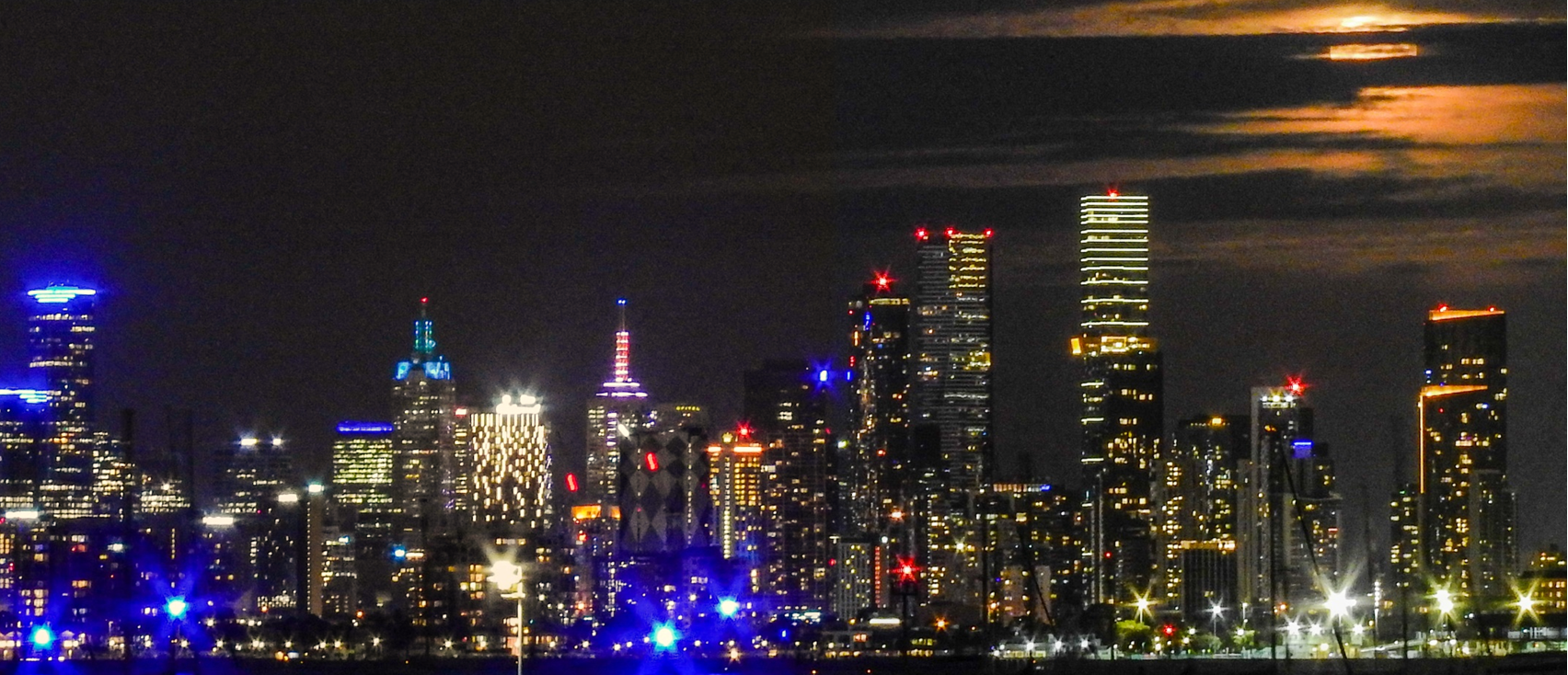
Australia 108 (centre-right) along Melbourne's skyline in January 2022

== See also ==
- List of buildings with 100 floors or more
