= Flinders Wharf =

Apartment complex in Melbourne

Coordinates: 37.822819°S 144.952524°E

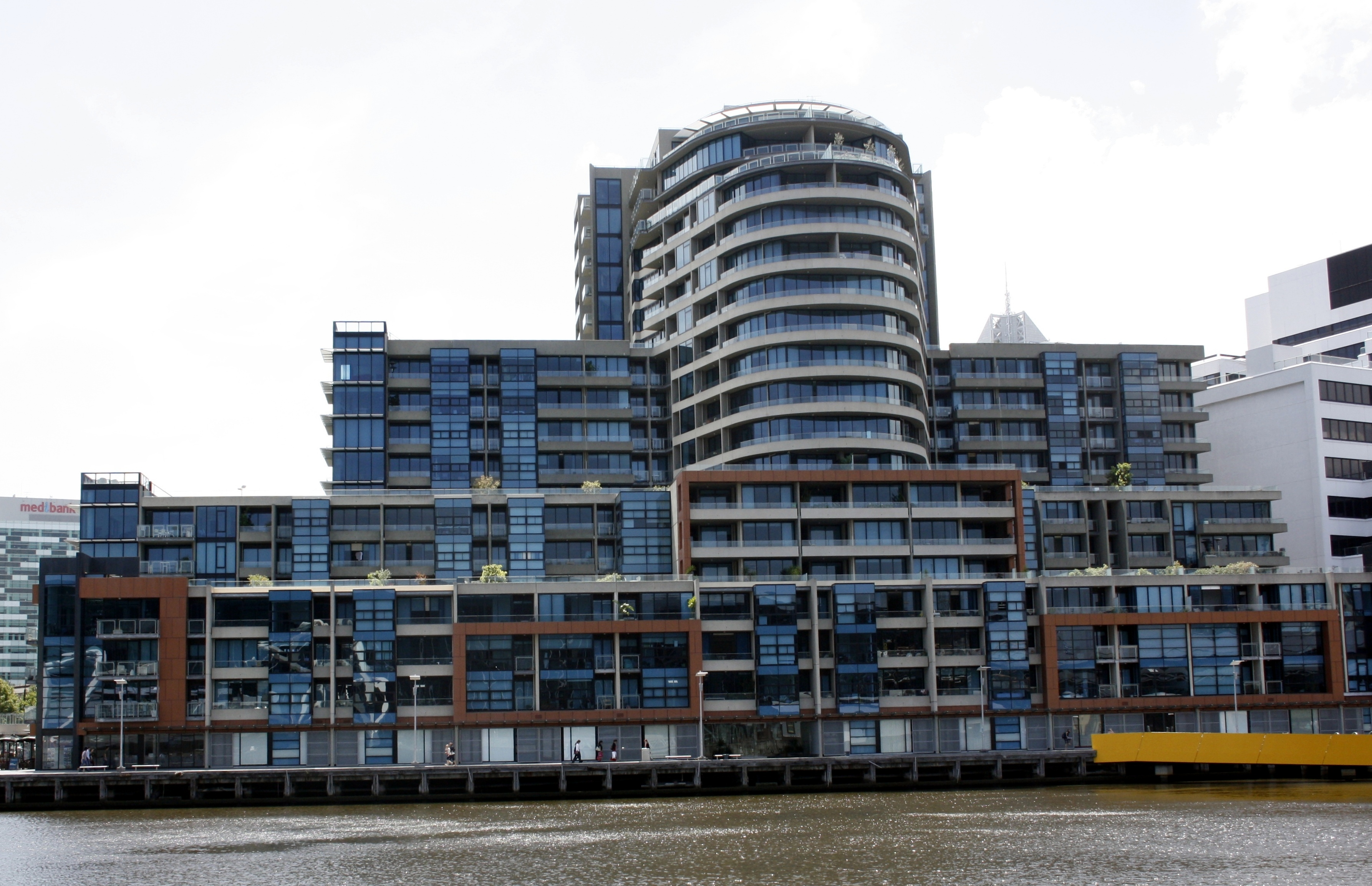
Flinders Wharf viewed from across the Yarra River

Flinders Wharf (previously known as Flinders Wharf Apartments) is located in the Docklands area, along the northern bank of the Yarra River on the edge of the Melbourne city centre. The 300-apartment complex is home to a multicultural blend of personalities and is a short walk from Southern Cross station, Flinders Street station, Crown Casino, Docklands Stadium and many of Melbourne's other attractions. Most of the complex consists of residents who either own or lease their apartment. Some of the apartments are "short stay" apartments, where individuals or groups stay for a short period (usually less than a month.)

On the western side of the complex, the Victorian State Government has developed an open space for recreational use known as Seafarers Rest.

The complex itself includes a number of restaurants on the ground floor. The other side of the river includes a hotel, shopping complex, restaurants, bars and a conference centre, along with the Polly Woodside. A cross bridge from Flinders Wharf to the other side of the river also exists.

== History ==
The site now known as Flinders Wharf, on Siddeley Street in Melbourne Docklands, was previously Wharf 4 on the Yarra River. The apartment complex was completed in March 2003 by Multiplex.

== Controversy ==
The apartment complex has not been without controversy.

In late 2003 a disgruntled investor sued the developer for "misleading and deceptive conduct". Richard Gough claimed the developer had used misleading and deceptive representations about the financing of the property and its future value in order to secure a sale.

Then in 2004 a developer from another Docklands apartment took legal action against the developers of Flinders Wharf. Tony Brady alleged that the penthouse apartment he bought at Flinders Wharf was not "finished as a luxury penthouse", and changes were made during development without him receiving advance warning.

In recent years there has been an increasing amount of litigation being brought by off-the-plan investors seeking to get out of their apartment contracts in the growing Docklands area of Melbourne. Pressure from developers and builders has caused the Victorian Government to change legislation to reduce the increasing number of claims.
