= Main Point (building) =

Historic building in South Melbourne, Australia

Main Point Hotel

General information
- Status: Completed
- Architectural style: Renaissance Revival
- Location: Southbank, 235–237 City Road, Southbank, Melbourne, Australia
- Coordinates: 37.82623°S 144.960046°E
- Current tenants: The Costume Shop
- Construction started: 1903

References
- St Kilda Historical Society

The Main Point hotel was once a prominent feature in South Melbourne. The current building was built in 1903 but replaced an earlier structure on the same site. Although it is still relatively well-preserved, it is obscured by the King's Way overpass.

== History ==
=== Original structure ===
In 1869 George William Hall applied for a publican's licence for a house built of wood and plaster and situated at corner of Moray-street and Sandridge-road (now City Road). He was granted a licence and named this establishment the Main Point Hotel.

Ownership of the hotel transferred to Alexander Marks in 1870 and towards the end of 1871 the hotel was renovated. Unfortunately Marks' original application appears to have been issued improperly. Magistrate Mr. C. Mollison PM refused to renew the license in 1872 meaning Main Point could not legally operate for several months until the issue was resolved. Marks died in November 1873 age 36.

At some point the hotel passed to J. F. Kennedy. On his death in 1899 his executrix ordered the property to be sold. Main Point was advertised as a going concern, having already been leased to a good tenant for five years at £150 per year. Emily and James Rubira are likely to have purchased the hotel at this time.

=== Current structure ===
It is not clear why Emily and James Rubira decided to rebuild the hotel, but in 1903 they demolished the former structure and started work on the new hotel. Mr. Rubira was already operating a successful cafe and hotel at 305 Bourke Street. Rubira sold the Bourke Street cafe in 1927 for a £50,000 and was therefore a man of some wealth.

The area around the Main Point hotel developed a somewhat sordid reputation. Numerous bashings and robberies are reported in this area, and hotels frequently pushed the boundaries of their licensing regulations.

== Licence deprivation ==
Main Point escaped an earlier attempt at licence reduction in 1908, but by 1926 again the licensing commissioner believed that there was an 'overstocking' of hotels within Melbourne causing 'keen competition' and illegal trading. De-licensing six hotels within the South Melbourne area was proposed by the licensing court, and this was thought not to inconvenience the public, as the demand for accommodation was not great. Concerns were further heightened by the opening of the new Spencer Street Bridge, thus diverting more traffic away from the area of South Melbourne. In considering closure, the commissioner, Mr. Barr, cited poor buildings, lack of accommodation, number of hotels (in proximity) and the number of convictions as his criteria for determining license deprivation.

In giving evidence to retain its license, Mr. Rubira told the licensing court that if hotel were permitted to retain, he would consider building an establishment 'on the lines of his Bourke Street Café'. By June the fate of Main Point had been sealed and in November, the compensation packages were announced. Businesses were to cease trading by 31 December 1926. The operator of Main Point at that time, Thomas Rayner Keane, died shortly before compensation was announced but was declared insolvent in 1928.

Within very close proximity to Main Point, the Trades Hotel was also de-licensed, but the George Hotel and the Castlemaine (Commercial) Hotel remained. Over 128 hotels have been recorded in the South Melbourne area.

== Post de-licensing ==
The hotel appears to have continued operating as a cafe and was the scene of an assault of one employee on another employee in 1935.

The Main Point hotel has operated as home of the Costume Shop for over 20 years

== Urban renewal ==
Southbank was one of the subjects of the Victorian Government urban renewal push in the 1990s. Developers purchased large parts of Southbank and developed a number of residential and commercial sites. In 2011, the City of Melbourne released a strategic plan for the redevelopment of Southbank.

The land adjoining the Main Point hotel was purchased by Central Equity and the Main Point tower started construction in 2011. The adjoining tower will be one of the tallest buildings in Melbourne. The Main Point Hotel remains undisturbed in this development and regains some its prominence lost when it was obscured by the Kings Way overpass.

== Other references ==
During the First World War, two enlisted soldiers are known to have had links with the hotel. Lance Corporal Slocombe listed his mother, Mrs. Hastain, as residing at the Main Point Hotel. Private Mack listed his address, and the address of his next-of-kin (sister), at the Main Point Hotel in 1916.
