= Prima Pearl =

Residential skyscraper

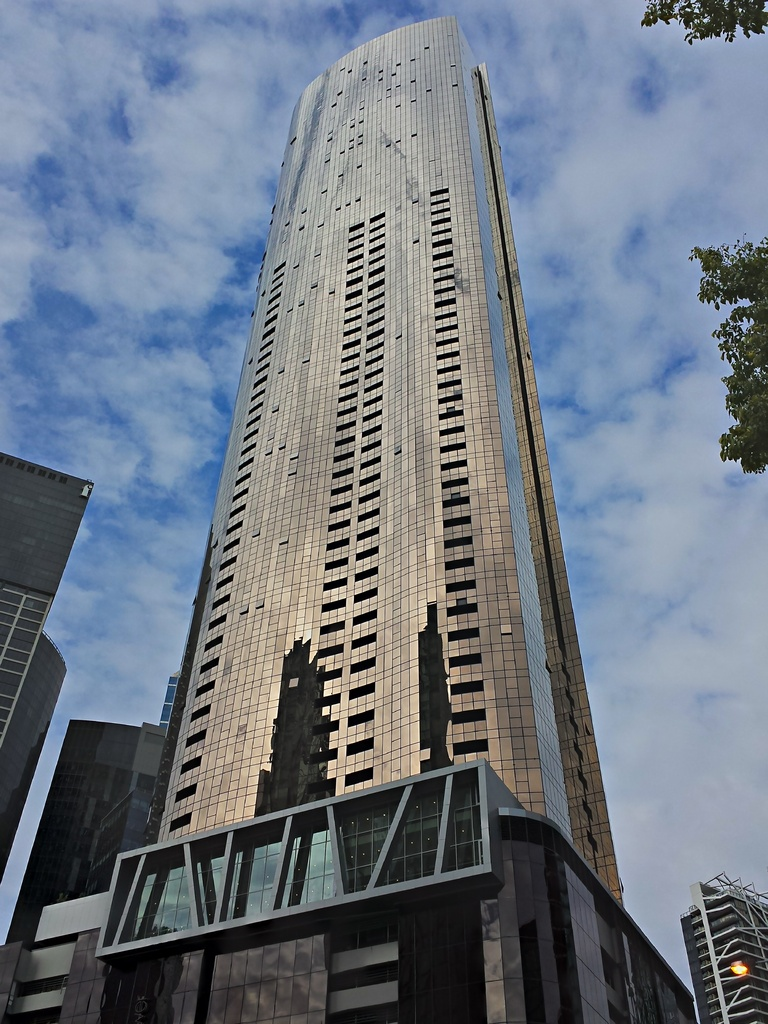
- Prima Pearl tower

General information
- Status: Completed
- Type: Residential
- Location: 35 Queensbridge Square, Melbourne, Australia
- Completed: 2014
- Operator: Connect Facilities

Height
- Roof: 254 m (833 ft)
- Top floor: 244 m (801 ft)

Technical details
- Floor count: 72
- Floor area: 102,000 m^{2} (1,100,000 sq ft)
- Lifts/elevators: 7

Design and construction
- Architect: Disegno Australia
- Developer: PDG Corporation and Schiavello
- Engineer: Meinhardt Group
- Main contractor: Multiplex

Website
- www.primapearl.com.au

Prima Pearl (also referred to as Pearl Tower and Prima Tower) is a residential skyscraper completed in 2014, in the Southbank precinct of Melbourne, Victoria, Australia. As of 2022, the skyscraper is the seventh–tallest building in Melbourne and the 13th–tallest building in Australia.

== History ==
=== Initial project ===
In 1984, the Schiavello group bought the 35 Queensbridge Square site in Southbank; among the group's first land purchase in Melbourne. By 2002, the group formally submitted plans to the State Government for a 225–metre (738-foot) tall residential skyscraper – in the midst of oversupply or "glut" concerns within the inner–city apartment market. Nevertheless, the $AUD230 million project, then dubbed 'Prima on Southbank', would have been one of the tallest residential buildings in Melbourne, only surpassed by the nearby Eureka Tower (under–construction at the time), but considerably taller than Freshwater Place North, which was also being constructed in 2002 adjacent to the Prima development. The 63–level skyscraper was designed by Australian architect, Ivan Rijavec, and the project would have comprised 332 residential apartments.

Approval was granted for the skyscraper in 2004, by then–Minister for Planning Mary Delahunty; however, one of the conditions of approval was that the skyscraper be reduced in height to 160 metres (525 feet), a move supported by the Melbourne City Council which recommended buildings in Southbank to not eclipse such height. Schiavello challenged the condition for approval at the Victorian Civil and Administrative Tribunal, which upheld the skyscraper's initial height on the basis that the design was "exemplary". Despite the win, the project never proceeded to sales, and was henceforth shelved by the developer until 2009.

=== Subsequent development ===
The project was relaunched by Schiavello in 2010, this time with the collaboration of fellow developer PDG Corporation. Initially, the proposal submitted to the Minister for Planning was for a skyscraper which would be identical in height to the previous design; however, the number of apartments within the building almost doubled to 616. Other amendments included: a reduction in the number of car park spaces, and an increase to the number of floors within the building (from 63 to 66). During this planning phase, the developers were also pursuing a height increase for the skyscraper, which they later submitted and gained approval. Pursuant to the final plans for the project, the building would comprise two main residential lobbies; 'Prima' would contain half of the residential apartments across the higher section of the building, whilst 'Pearl' would contain the remaining apartments within the lower section of the building. Overall, the skyscraper would reach a height of 254 metres (833 feet), with 72 levels; among amenities such as a swimming pool, the 67th level features a sky–lounge for residents of Prima Pearl.

Early works and construction, which was undertaken by Multiplex on the AUD$292 million skyscraper, commenced as early as March 2012. By July 2014, Prima Pearl had topped–out and was completed later that year. Upon completion, Prima Pearl was the fourth–tallest building in Melbourne and the fifth–tallest building in Australia. As of 2022, it is the seventh-tallest building in Melbourne and the 13th–tallest building in Australia.

== Gallery ==
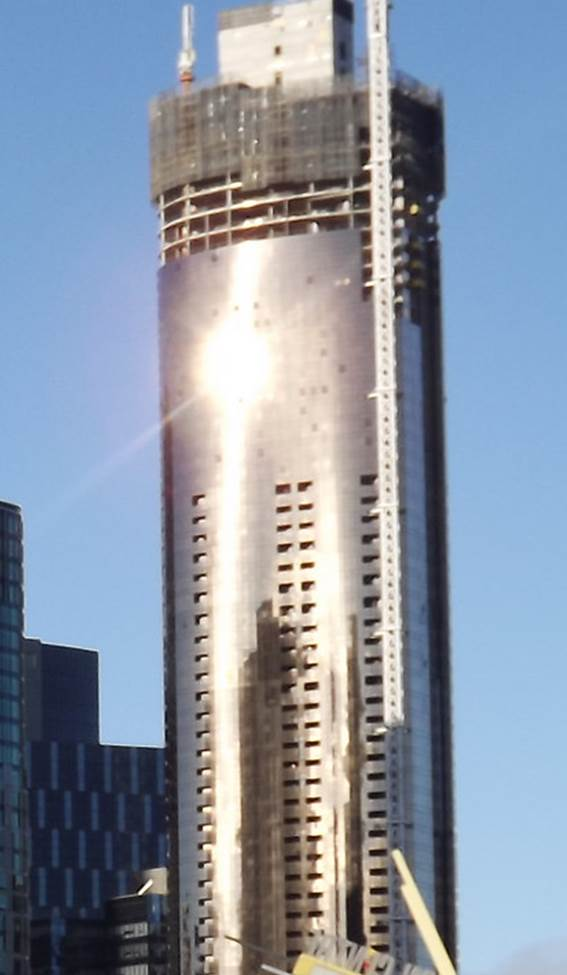
Prima Pearl under construction, mid–2014

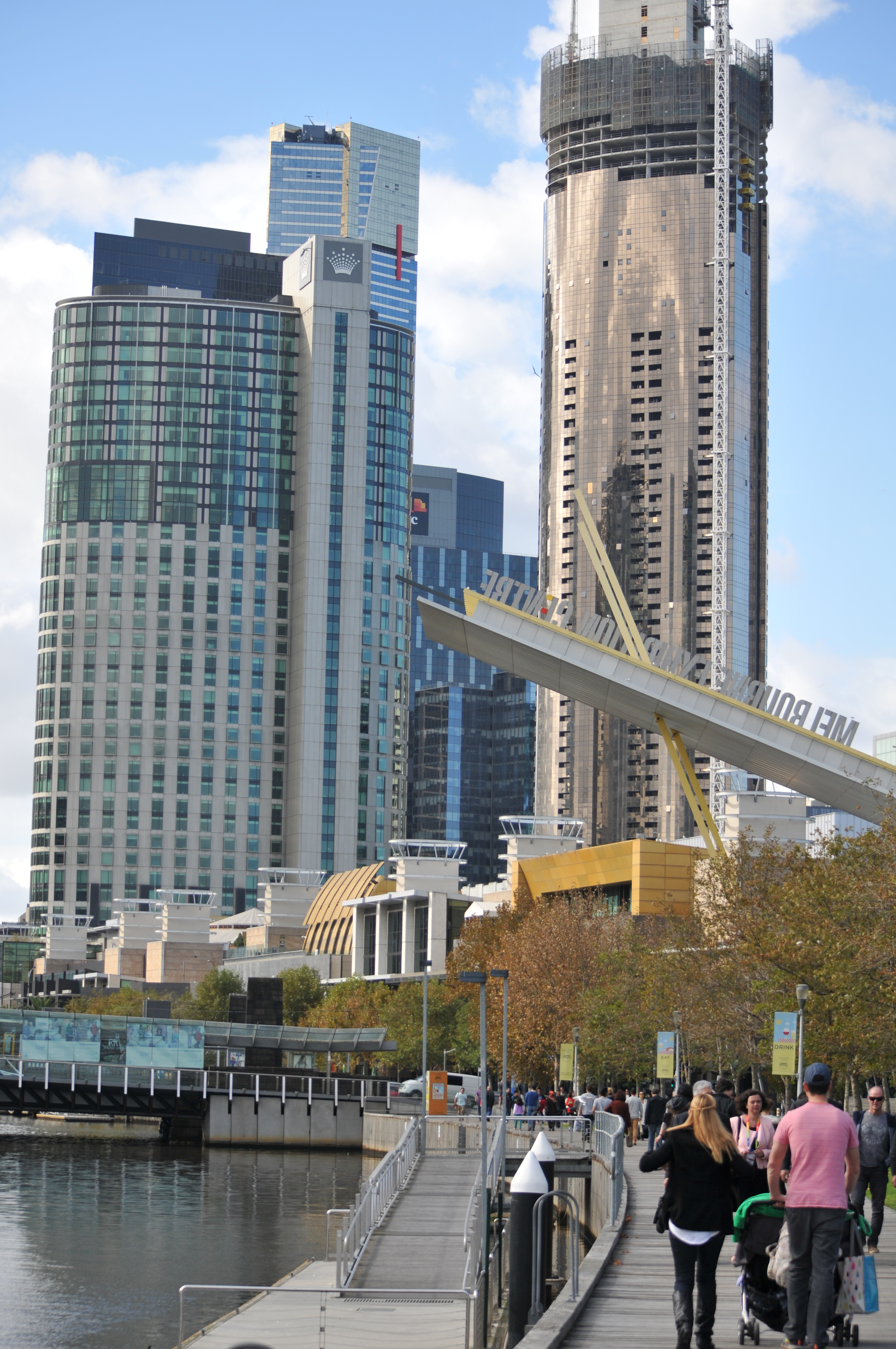
Prima Pearl under construction, late–2014

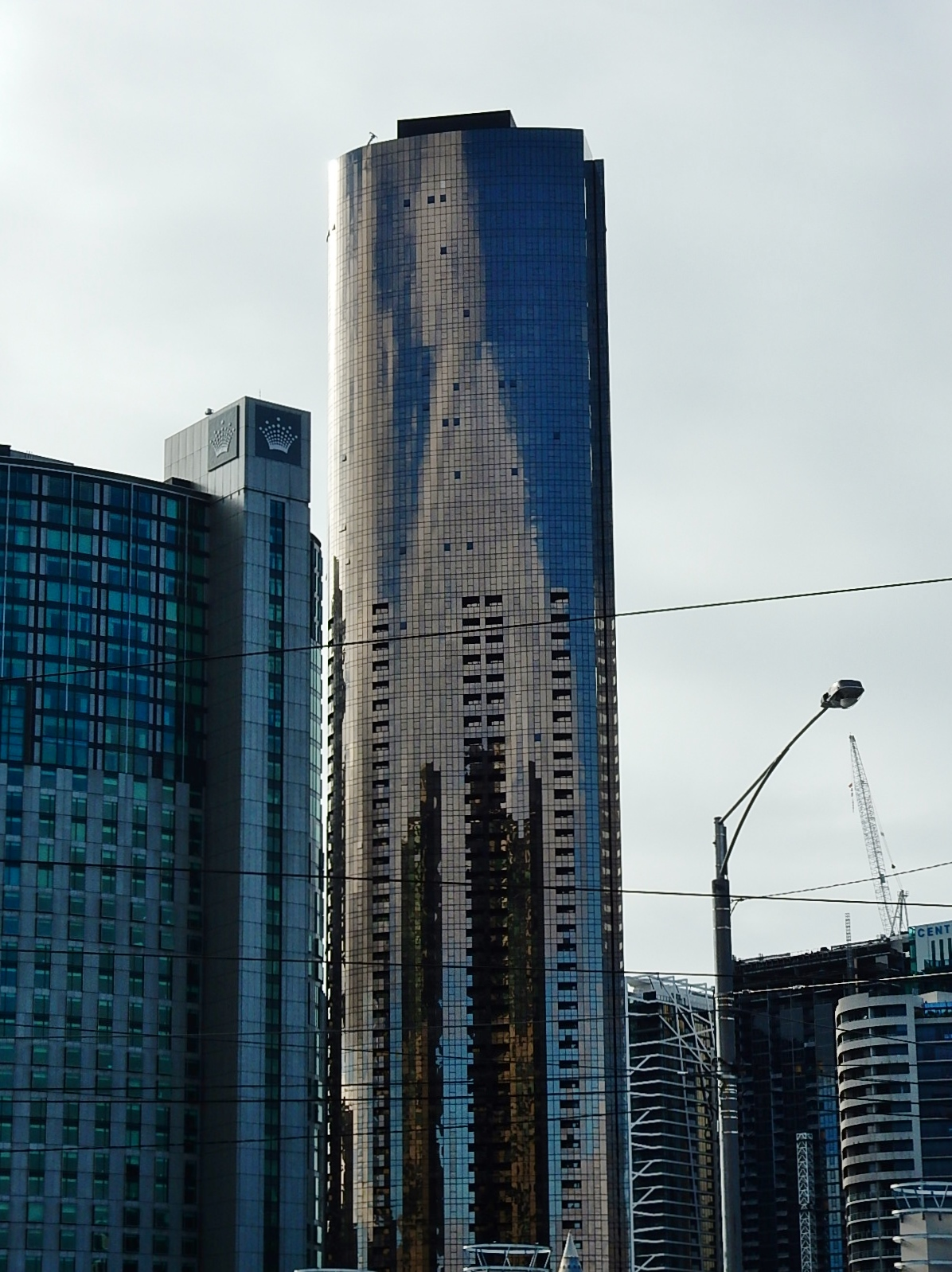
April 2015

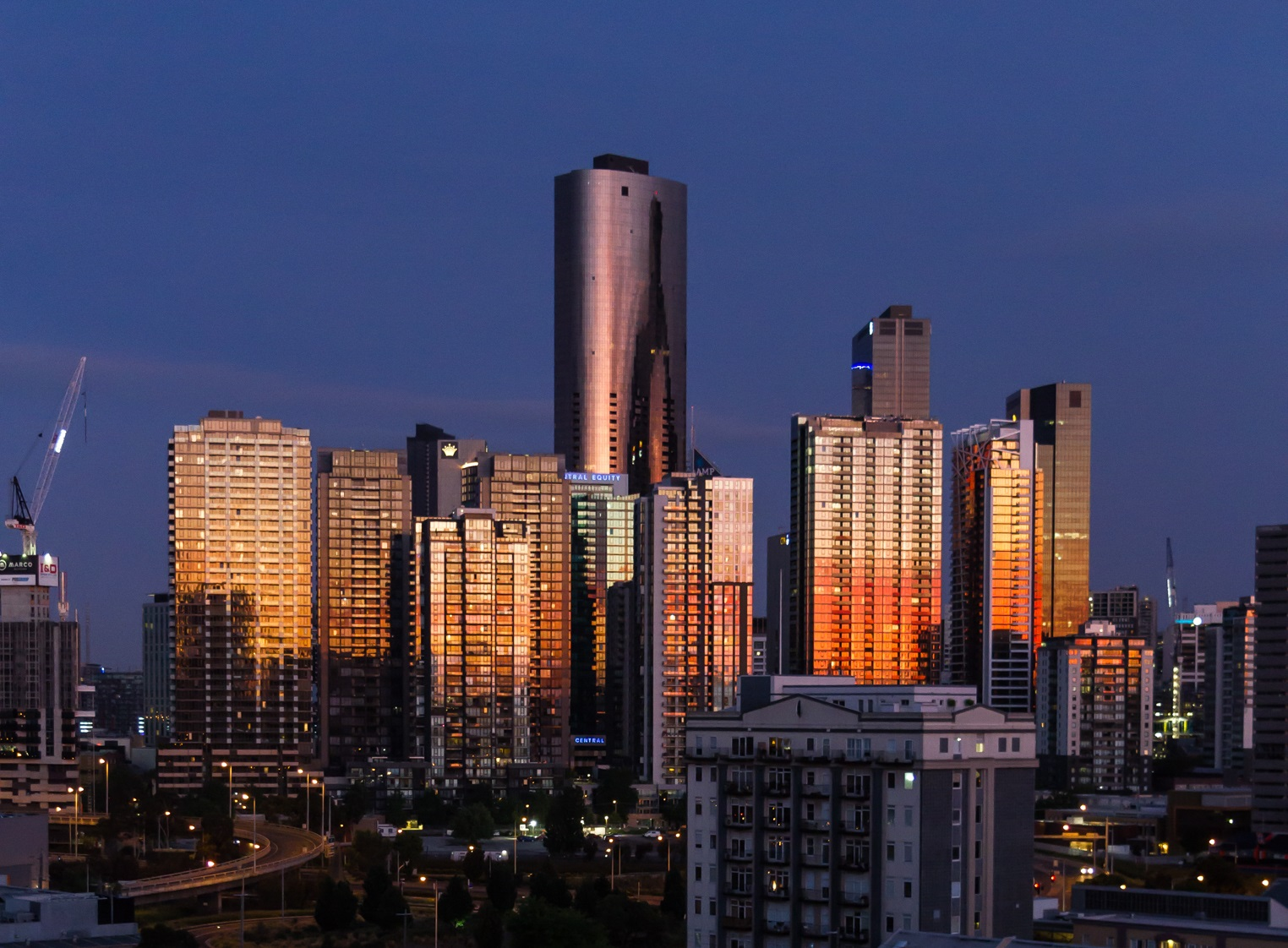
November 2015

== See also ==
- List of tallest buildings in Melbourne
- List of tallest buildings in Australia
