= Southbank, Victoria =

Southbank
- Suburb
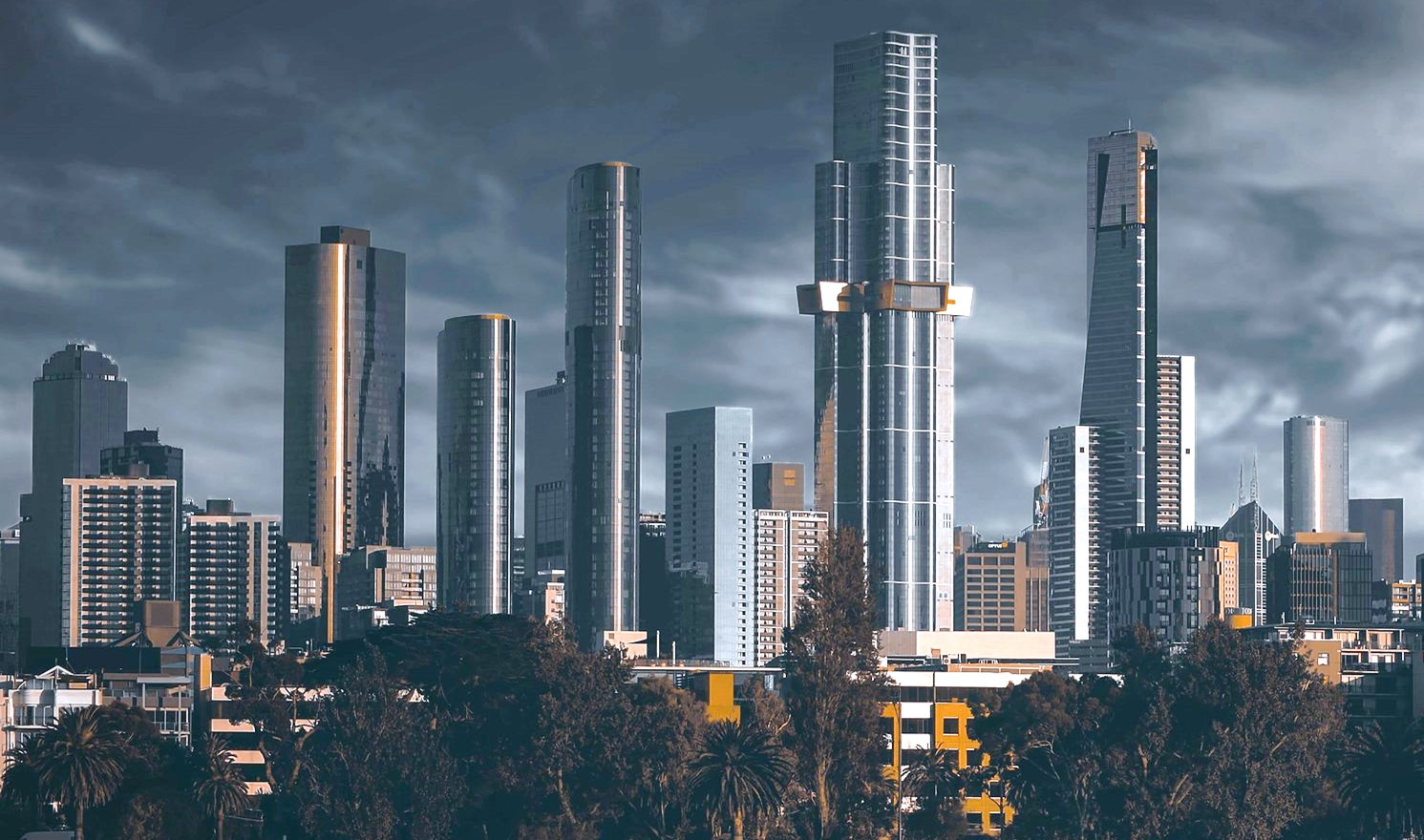
- View towards skyline of Southbank from Albert Park and Lake

- Interactive map of Southbank
- Coordinates: 37.829°S 144.957°E
- Country: Australia
- State: Victoria
- City: Melbourne
- LGAs: City of Melbourne; City of Port Phillip
- Location: 1 km (0.62 mi) S of Melbourne CBD
- Established: 1990

Government
  - State electorate: Albert Park
  - Federal division: Macnamara

Area
  - Total: 1.6 km^{2} (0.62 sq mi)
- Elevation: 7 m (23 ft)

Population
  - Total: 22,631 (2021 census)
  - Density: 14,100/km^{2} (36,600/sq mi)
- Postcode: 3006
- County: Bourke
Suburbs around Southbank
Docklands	Melbourne	Melbourne
South Wharf	Southbank	Melbourne
South Melbourne	Albert Park	Melbourne

Southbank is an inner-city suburb of Melbourne, Victoria, Australia, 1 km (0.62 mi) south of the Melbourne central business district, located within the Melbourne and Port Phillip local government areas. Southbank recorded a population of 22,631 at the 2021 census.

Its southernmost area is considered part of the central business district of the city. Southbank is bordered to the north by the Yarra River, and to the east by St Kilda Road. Southbank's southern and western borders are bounded by Dorcas Street, Kings Way, Market Street, Ferrars Street, and a triangle bordered by Gladstone Street, Montague Street and the West Gate Freeway.

Southbank was formerly a mostly industrial area, and simply part of the locality of South Melbourne, and the City of South Melbourne.

It was transformed into a densely populated district of high rise apartment and office buildings beginning in the early 1990s, as part of an urban renewal program. With the exceptions of the cultural precinct along St Kilda Road, few of the older industrial buildings were identified for retention.

Today, Southbank is dominated by high-rise development and is now the most densely populated areas of Melbourne, with a large cluster of apartment towers. It is home to many of Australia's tallest buildings including the tallest measured to its highest floor, the Australia 108 and the former tallest Eureka Tower. It is one of the primary business centres in Greater Melbourne, being the headquarters of Treasury Wine Estates, Crown Resorts, Alumina, Incitec Pivot, The Herald and Weekly Times Pty Ltd, as well as regional offices of many major corporations, in a cluster of towers with over 340,000 square metres of office space in 2008.

Southbank Promenade and Southgate Restaurant and Shopping Precinct, on the southern bank of the Yarra River, extending to Crown Casino, is one of Melbourne's major entertainment precincts. Southgate's landmark Ophelia sculpture by Deborah Halpern has been used to represent Melbourne in tourism campaigns.

== History ==
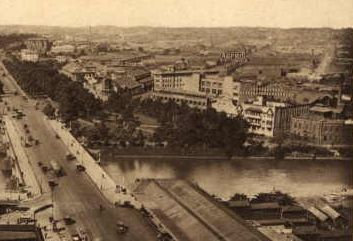
A view of South Melbourne's industrial area in 1938 looking south from the Melbourne central business district

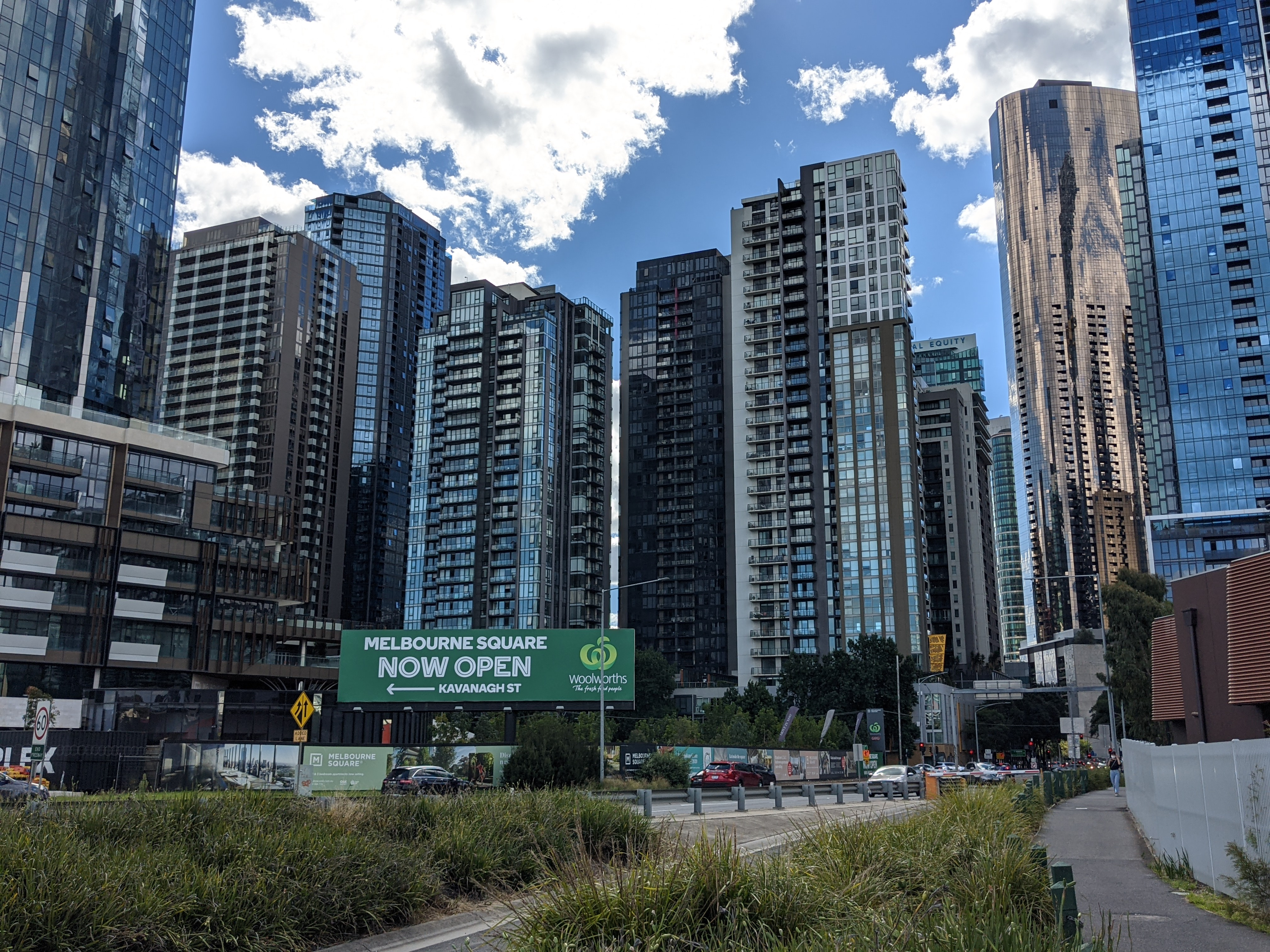
Apartment buildings in Southbank

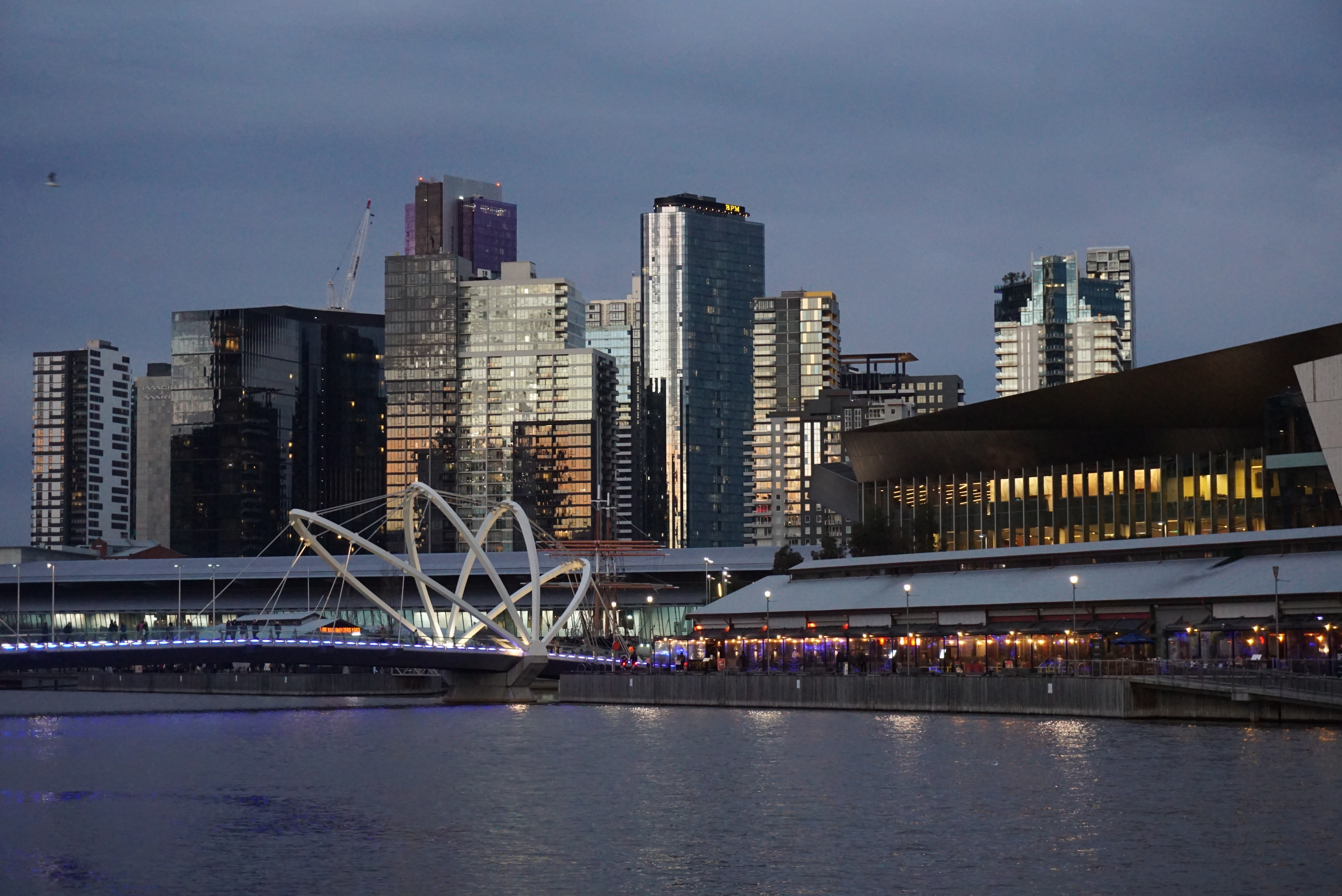
View towards Southbank from Docklands

Before European settlement, the area now called South Melbourne was a series of low lying swamps inhabited by Aboriginal tribes. With the establishment of Melbourne in 1835 on the opposite bank of the river, the area remained undeveloped for some time, although shipping used berths along the river west of what is now the Queens Bridge. St Kilda Road, connecting to Princes Bridge, was developed as the major thoroughfare to the southern suburbs of Melbourne on the east side, and the track from the shipping piers of Port Melbourne to the city was formalised as City Road. After the Port Melbourne railway line was built across the area in 1854, the swamps were filled and the land, still much of which was in government hands, was developed as an industrial area. In 1888 the rail line was rebuilt, including the present Sandridge Bridge, and in 1890 Queensbridge was built creating another access to City Road, allowing cable tram access to Port Melbourne. By this time the riverside west of Queensbridge was lined with wharves and shipping sheds and maritime businesses including the Duke & Orr drydock, now housing the Polly Woodside maritime museum (this small area including the Exhibition Centre was separated off as its own suburb South Wharf in 2008). Princes Bridge was rebuilt in 1888, allowing cable trams to reach the southern suburbs along St Kilda Road, and raising the road level at the river's edge, with gardens established either side, the western one known as the Snowden Gardens.

A wide range of industries and warehousing occupied much of the area, mainly low scale shed-like light industrial buildings, but also heavy engineering works such as Austral Otis elevators on Kings Way (formerly Hannah Street), multi level store houses such as the Tea House on Clarendon Street, as well as the Castlemaine Brewery. By 1940 businesses included the Allen's factory opposite Flinders Street station (with its famous animated neon sign), the Malvern Star bicycle works, and numerous car sales and maintenance businesses. By 1900 what is now the Victorian Arts Centre had become an entertainment precinct, with the Green Mill dance hall and circus site, and a large cinema and the Glacarium ice skating rink along City Road. In the 1920s the YMCA was built where City Road joined St Kilda Road, and in the 1960s two high rise office towers were built between City Road and Allen's. Replacing the amusement area, the National Gallery of Victoria was opened in 1968, with the Arts Centre eventually opening in the early 1980s. In 1987 the elevated West Gate Freeway was extended to Kings Way, and by 1999 was extended to join the CityLink tunnels, carving a line across Southbank with a large area occupied by off ramps.

St Kilda Road was soon lined with a series of important institutions including the Police Barracks, Prince Henry's Hospital and the Victoria Barracks. It also contained amusements such as a circus and dance halls where the Arts Centre is now.

In the 1980s the "give the Yarra a go' campaign was intended to create public awareness of the possibilities of making the south bank of the river a more useful part of the city, rather than the city 'turning its back' on the river. Planning toward this goal began under Planning Minister Evan Walker, and the first projects were the construction of a footbridge, the first such project in the city, now known as the Evan Walker Footbridge, designed by Cocks Carmichael Whitford, and the Southbank Promenade, designed by Denton Corker Marshall, opening in 1990. The two projects together won the RVIA Urban Design Award in 1991.

The Southgate development, which includes a shopping precinct, the Sheraton Towers hotel and new office buildings for the Herald & Weekly Times and IBM were built soon after in stages between 1990 and 1993, and combined with a new Sunday arts and crafts market, attracted tourists to the area. Further buildings including the Esso headquarters were built between 1992 and 1995. In 1987 the Port Melbourne railway line was closed and converted to light rail, running up Clarendon Street and into the city, freeing up the land of the raised viaduct, and with the State Government combining surrounding land which it already owed, allowed the development along the Yarra River westward, with the Melbourne Convention & Exhibition Centre in 1996 and Crown Casino in 1997.

From the 1970s, the old Police Barracks had been home to the Victorian College of the Arts, and in the late 1980s an old Malthouse in City Road was converted into the Malthouse Theatre. Other institutions have joined since the 2000s to create the Melbourne Arts Precinct including award-winning buildings for the Australian Centre for Contemporary Art in 2002, the Southbank Theatre, Melbourne Recital Centre, and the Iwaki Auditorium at the ABC Centre

In the early 2000s, a new headquarters for the State Emergency Service was built in City Road.

Central Equity was a leader in the development of the area with apartment towers beginning in the mid-1990s, including Riverside Place, The Summit, Sentinel, Victoria Tower, Melbourne Tower and City Tower in the streets behind the waterfront. Central Equity apartments are aimed at both the owner occupier and rental market with management provided by Melbourne Inner City Management (MICM), a fully owned subsidiary of Central Equity. The 91 floor Eureka Tower was begun in 2002, aimed at being the tallest residential tower in the world and was completed in 2006. As part of the initial construction of Southgate, St Johns Lutheran Church relocated from the land that is now the site of the Herald & Weekly Times building a few metres up City Road, to 20 City Road, and serves the Southbank community as a church and spiritual centre. The Church can be accessed either from City Rd or from the Southgate Shopping complex. The Queensbridge Precinct began development in 2005 with Freshwater Place. A plaza linked to the north bank and Flinders Street railway station via a pedestrian and cycle path developed on the Sandridge Bridge. Having been disused since the closure of the railway line in 1987, it was spared from demolition and was opened to the public on 12 March 2006, just in time for the 2006 Commonwealth Games. The Northbank promenade was completed later in 2006 linking other promenades on the north side of the river.

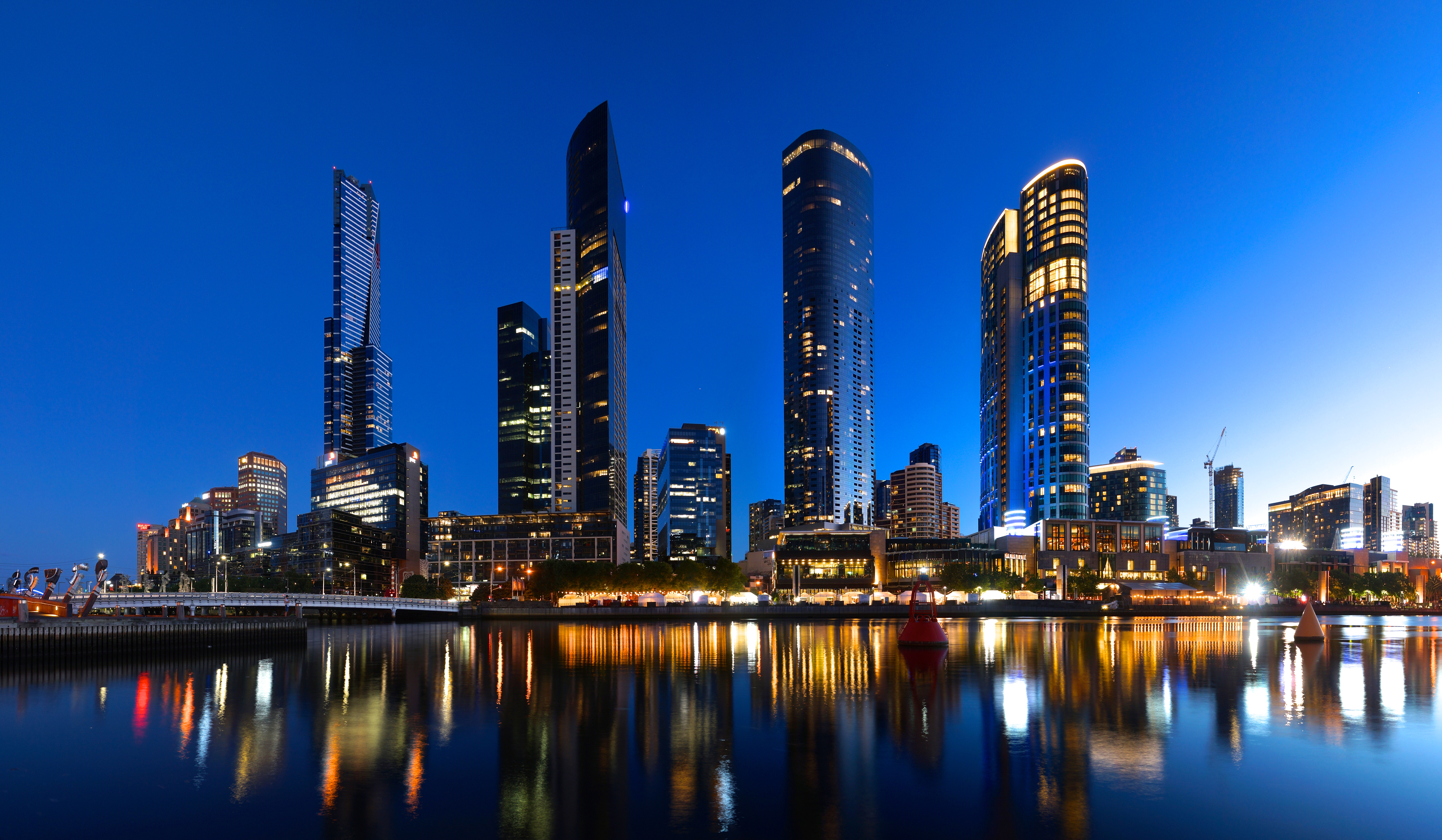
Southbank skyline at night. From left to right: Eureka Tower, Freshwater Place, Prima Pearl, Crown Melbourne.

An increasing number of corporations began opening their offices in Southbank. PwC relocated its office from Spring Street to Freshwater Place in 2005. JB Hi-Fi relocated its corporate headquarters from Chadstone Shopping Centre to Southgate in 2020, after its acquisition of The Good Guys. Other names on the list include Fujitsu, and Foster's. In May 2008 the Victorian Government created the new suburb place and name South Wharf, in the western end of Southbank (now encompassing the Melbourne Convention & Exhibition Centre and the Polly Woodside National Trust museum). South Wharf is home to several large apartment buildings, along with a hotel and a large shopping centre precinct. Southbank and South Wharf share the same postcode (3006).

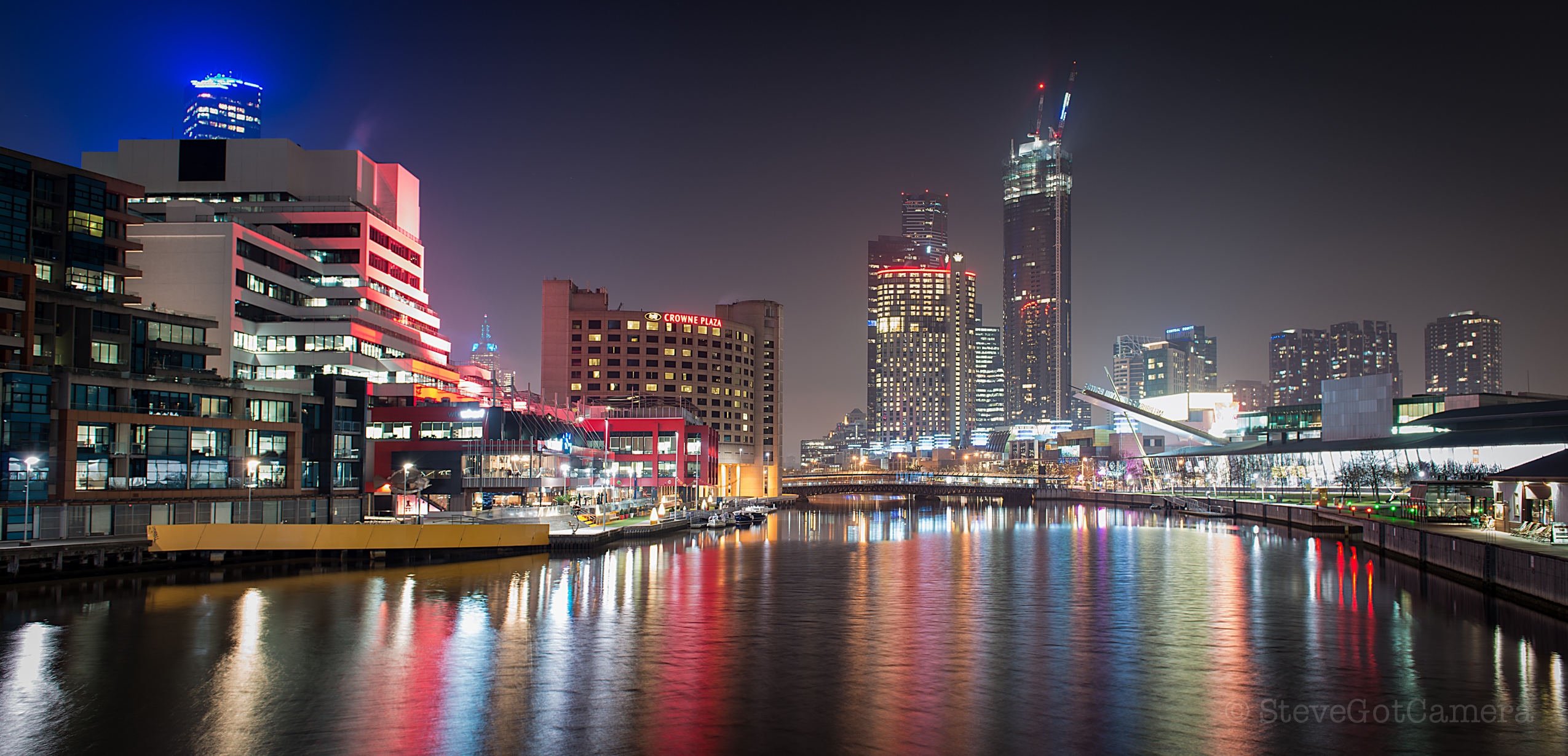
Southwharf at night in July 2014. Prima Pearl, completed in 2015, is under construction in the photo.

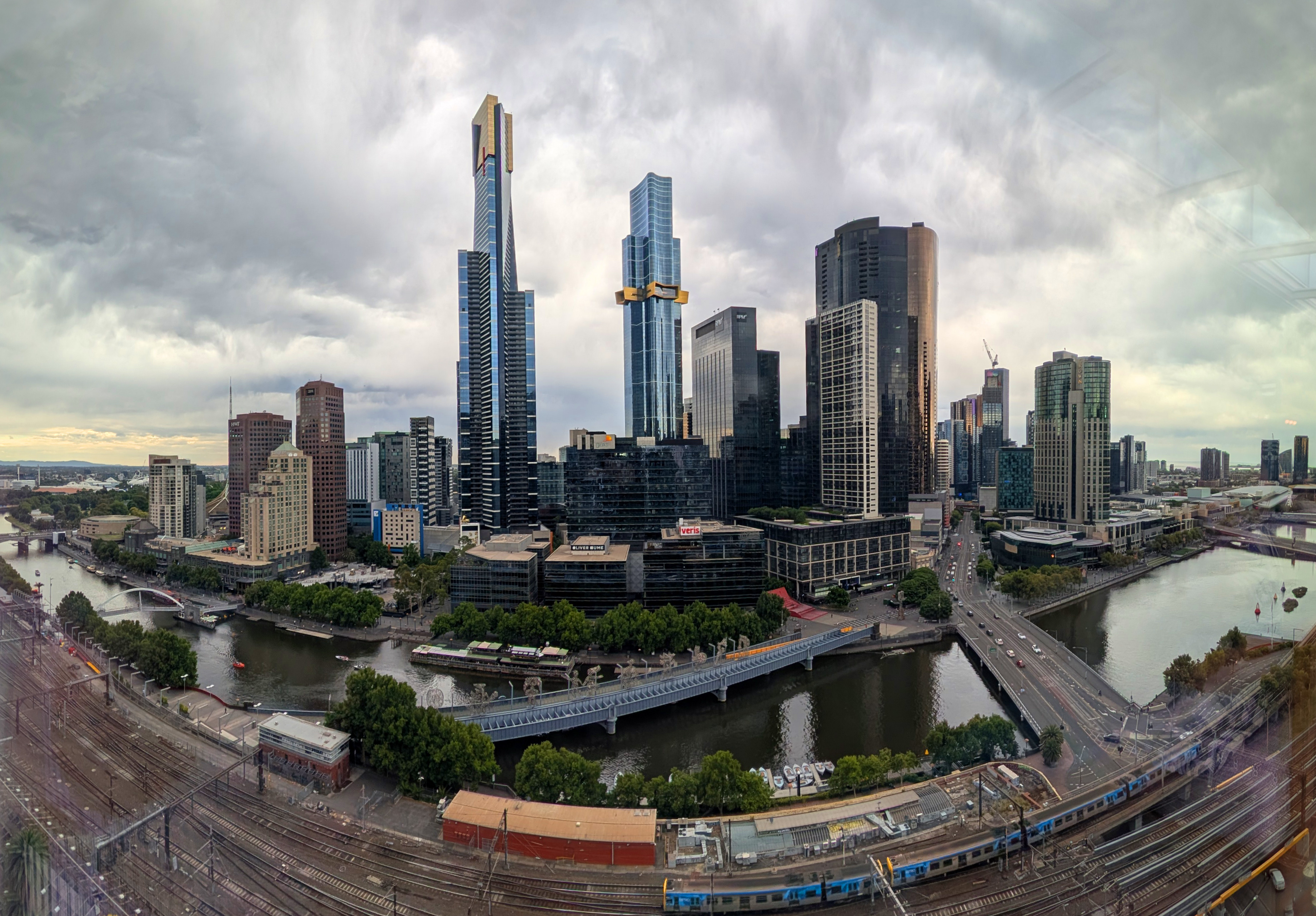
Panoramic view of Southbank and the Yarra River in 2025

== Heritage ==
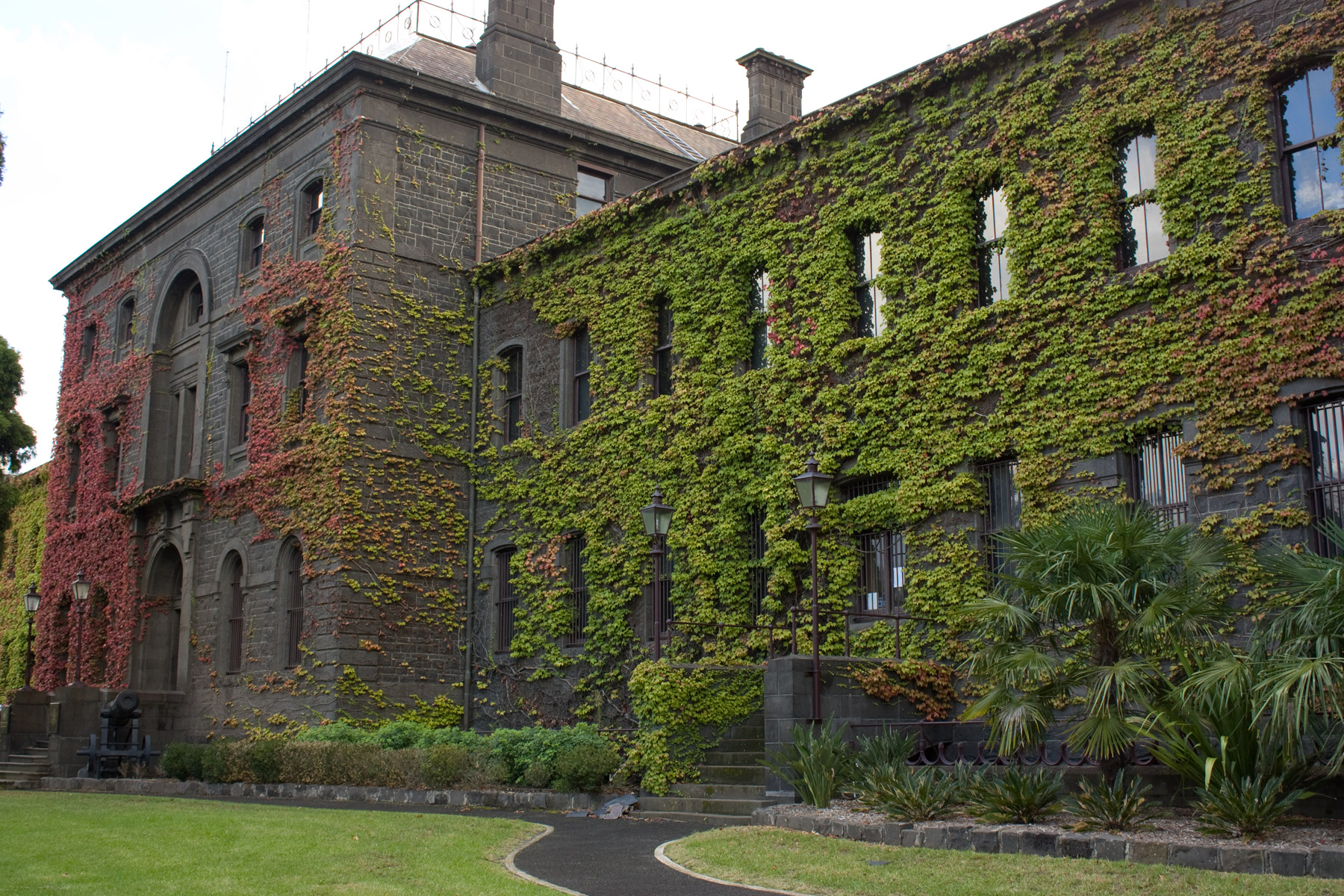
Historic Victoria Barracks.

Despite being dominated by modern apartments and office towers Southbank has a number of significant retained heritage buildings. Along St Kilda Road they include the 19th Century Victoria Barracks and the attached former Repatriation Commission Outpatient Clinic, the Victorian Arts Centre and National Gallery of Victoria, parts of the Victorian College of the Arts campus. Some individual heritage buildings in the wider Southbank precinct include the 1888 Jones Bond Store (25–43 Southbank Boulevard), the former Main Point hotel building on City Road, the 1888 Tea House on Clarendon Street, the 1885 JH Boyd High School on City Road (now a community centre), and the former Castlemaine Brewery on Queensbridge Street.

== Demographics ==
In the 2021 Census, there were 22,631 people in Southbank. 33.3% people were born in Australia. The next most common countries of birth were India (9.4%), China (excludes SARs & Taiwan) (8.9%), Colombia (3.9%), Malaysia (3.7%) and England (3%). 45.4% spoke only English at home. Of the languages used at home, the top responses other than English were Mandarin (11.6%), Spanish (5.3%), Hindi (4%), Cantonese (3.1%) and Indonesian (2.1%).

In the 2016 Census, the most common response for religion was No Religion at 41.9%.

== Media ==
Southbank is home to the Melbourne headquarters of C31 Melbourne, the Australian Broadcasting Corporation including the studios for ABC Radio Melbourne, Radio National, ABC NewsRadio, ABC Classic, Triple J, ABV-2 and ABC Australia TV. The Herald and Weekly Times Tower (headquarters of the Herald Sun newspaper) is also located in Southbank. The suburb also has its own local newspaper the Southbank Local News, which circulates monthly.

== Promenade and footbridge ==
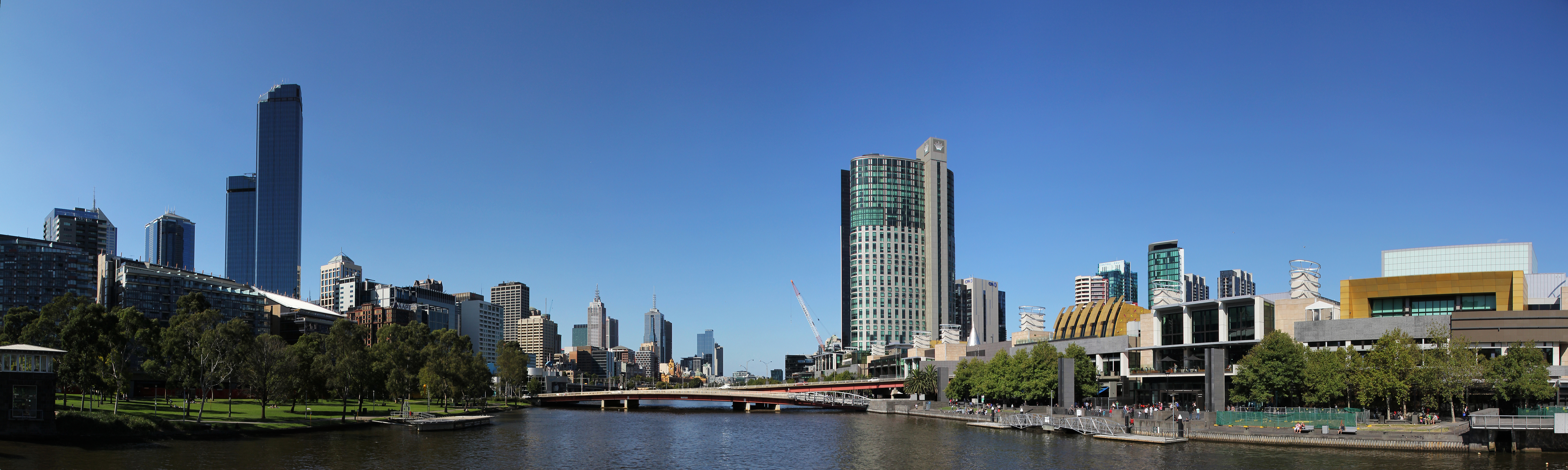
Southbank promenade during summer.

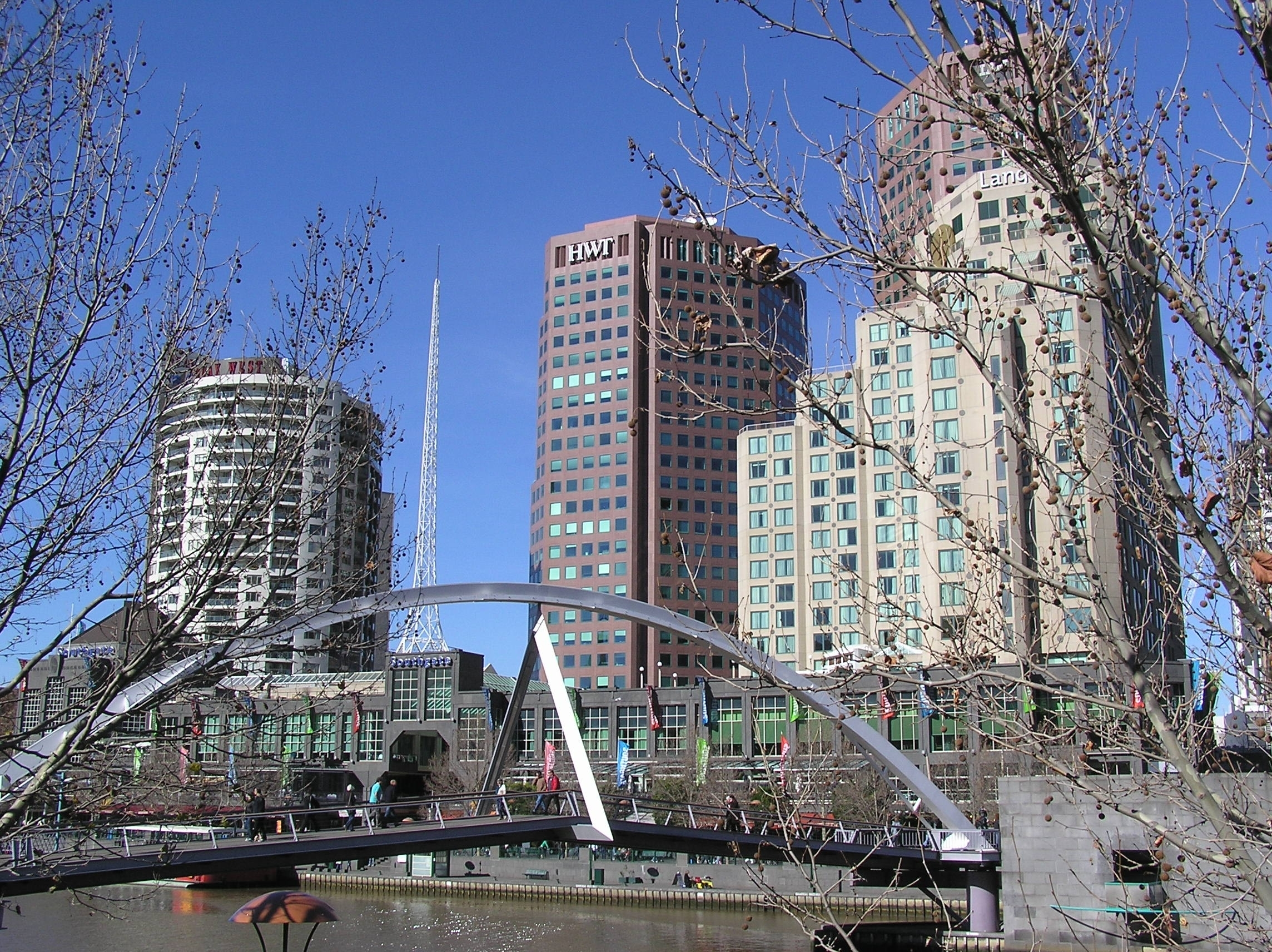
Southgate Footbridge and Southgate

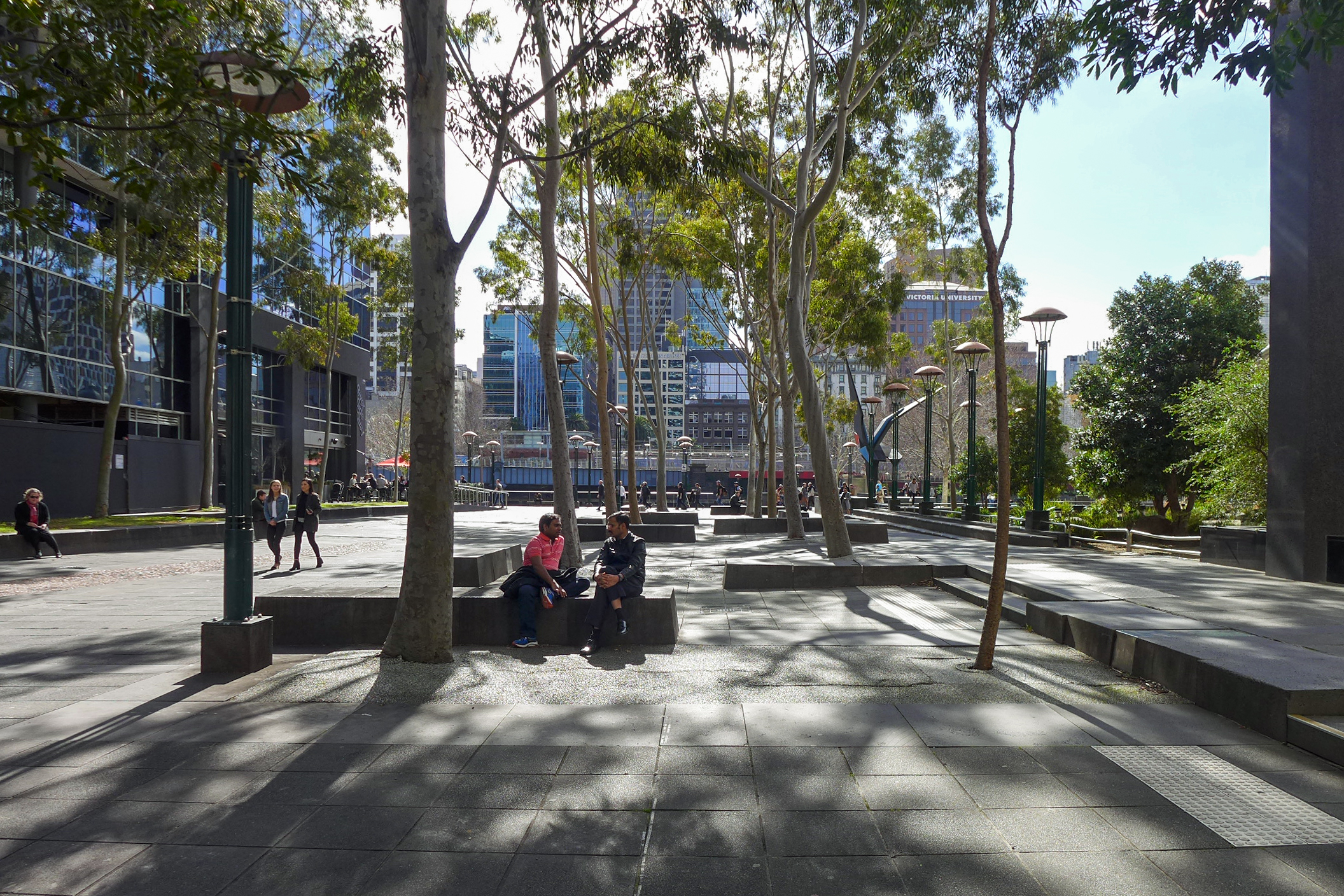
Southgate open space to promenade

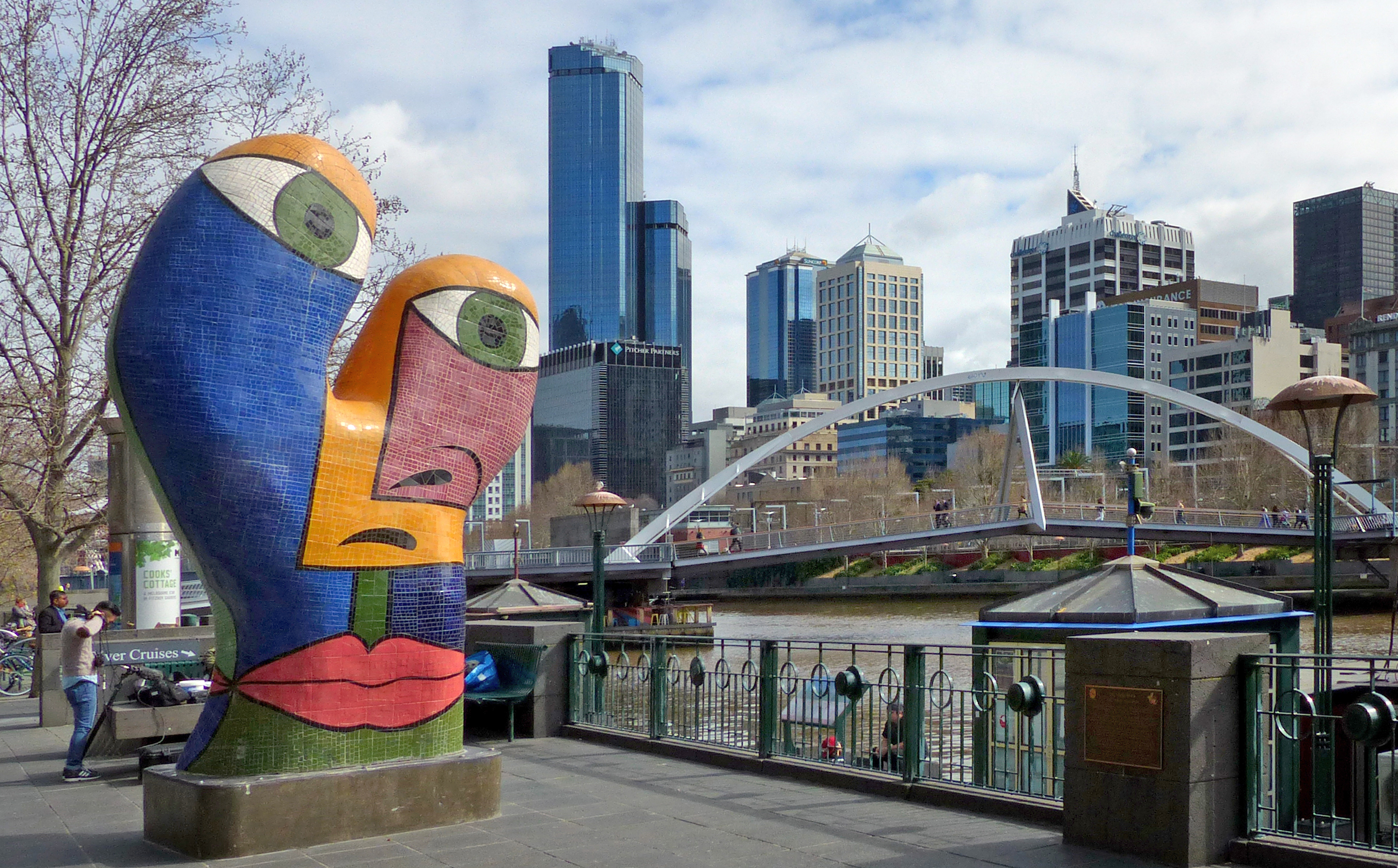
"Ophelia" by Deborah Halpern

The Southbank Promenade, completed in 1990, was designed by architects Denton Corker Marshall, and runs from Princes Bridge along to Queens Bridge Street and Queens Bridge. The Evan Walker Footbridge was also built at this time. The Yarra Promenade further to the west up to the Spencer Street Bridge was developed along with the Crown Entertainment Complex, completed in 1997, including Queensbridge Square, and running underneath the King Street Bridge.

The Southbank art and craft market occurs on the promenade near the Arts Centre every Sunday. The promenade is also home to several buskers and a pavement chalk artists.

== Transport ==
Southbank has a network of major roads running through it and is often heavily congested with traffic and limited mainly to off-street multi-storey parking. The West Gate Freeway runs along the south border which has numerous interchanges to Southbank's roads. The main north–south arterials leading into the Melbourne City Centre are Kingsway, Clarendon Street and Queensbridge/Moray Street. Secondary internal main roads include Southbank Boulevard, Sturt Street and Power Street. The main east–west arterials are City Road (east–west) and Normanby Road (which curves south into Whiteman Street). Many smaller roads allow one-way traffic only, to limit congestion.

Almost all southbound tramlines run along the St Kilda Road boundary, however the following tram lines run through Southbank:

- Route 1: Along Sturt Street
- Route 12: Along Clarendon Street
- Route 58: Along Queensbridge Street and Kings Way
- Route 96: Along Clarendon Street and Whiteman Street
- Route 109: Along Clarendon Street and Normanby Road

Although Southbank promenade forms part of the Capital City Bicycle Trail, the large number of pedestrians in the area means bicycle riding at high speed is hazardous; 10 km/h (6.2 mph) speed restrictions affecting cyclists are in place, with Victoria Police enforcing the speed limit.

== See also ==
- City of South Melbourne – Southbank was previously within this former local government area.
