= Building maintenance unit =

Mechanical device

A building maintenance unit (BMU) is a mechanical device, often suspended from a building's roof, designed to provide access to building surfaces for maintenance, cleaning, or inspection. They typically carry human operators over the structure's exterior, and can also be adapted for large interior surfaces such as atriums, stadium ceilings, or train stations.

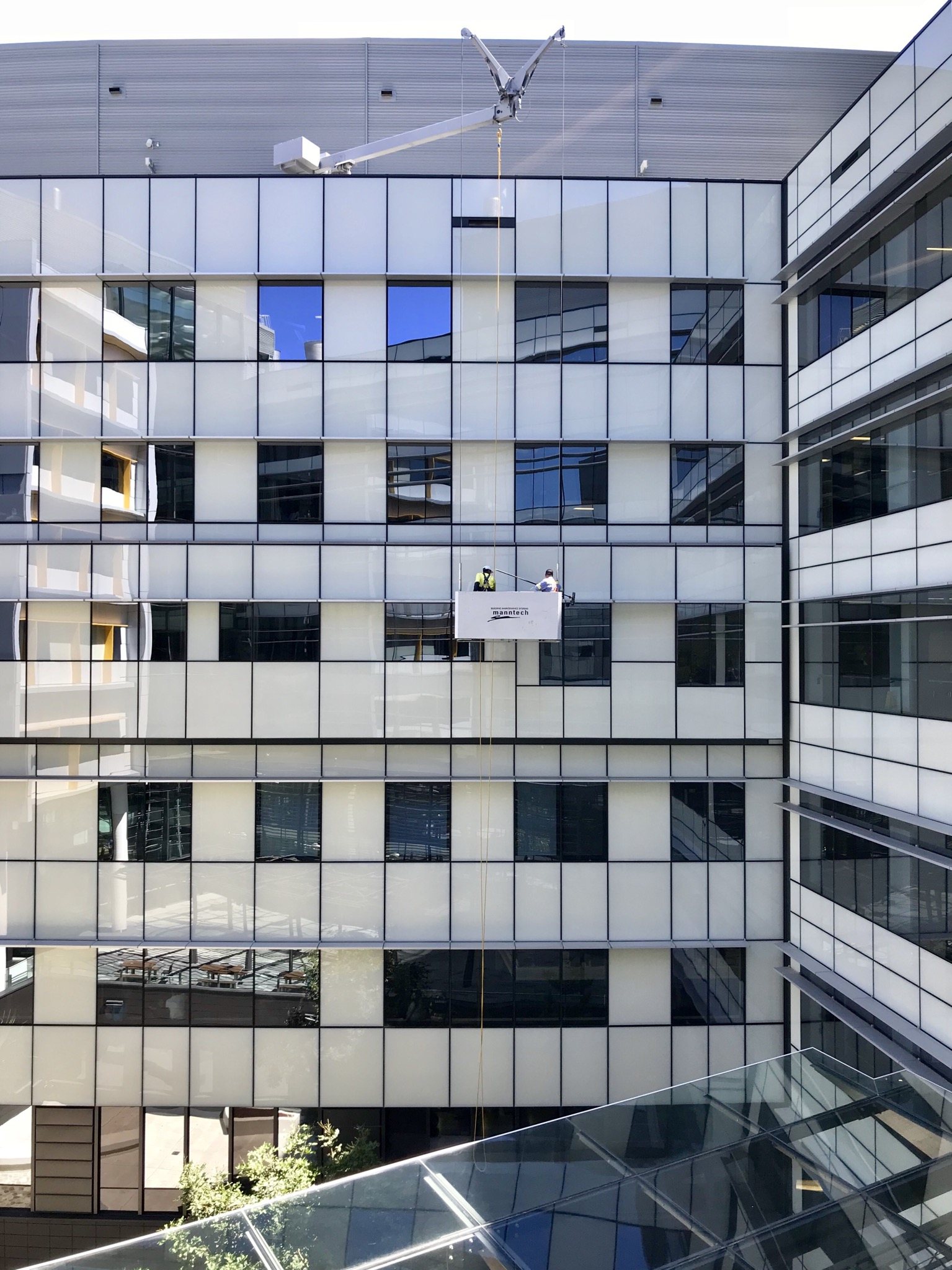
Workers clean the façade of a hospital from the building maintenance unit

Traditional suspended access systems require human operators to work at height and may be affected by wind and façade geometry, while robotic systems are intended to reduce direct human exposure and enable coordinated control of locomotion and cleaning mechanisms.
