= Freshwater Place =

Residential skyscraper in the Southbank district of Melbourne, Australia

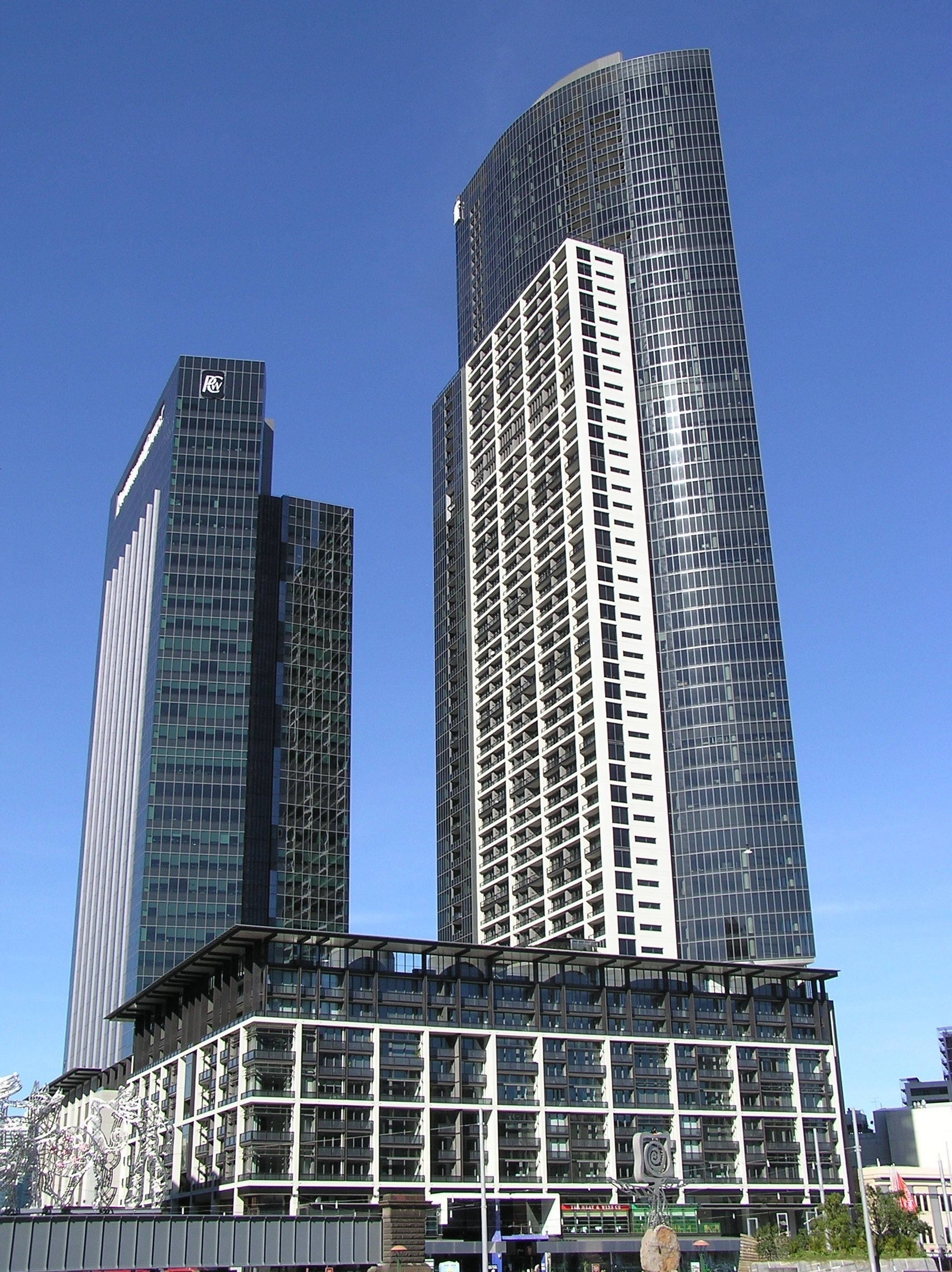

General information
- Type: Residential
- Location: Melbourne, Australia
- Coordinates: 37°49′17.41″S 144°57′43.99″E
- Completed: 2005

Technical details
- Floor count: 63

Design and construction
- Architect: Bates, Smart and McCutcheon
- Engineer: WSP Global

Freshwater Place is a residential skyscraper in the Southbank district of Melbourne, Australia. The building has a total of 536 apartment units. Construction was completed in 2005.

The residential tower has three sections: podium, mid-rise and high-rise. The high-rise section has a common area on the 40th floor known as the "Skyline Club" which houses an infinity pool, spa and steam room, gym and theatre. The 10th floor, which is an accessible floor, is equipped with a swimming pool, spa and steam room, gymnasium, theatre room, business hub, electric BBQs and a half acre rooftop lawn & garden.

== Location ==
Freshwater Place is located across the river from the Melbourne CBD. It is positioned next to the Eureka Tower, Prima Pearl and Crown Casino.

== Queensbridge Arcade ==
Queensbridge Arcade is located on the ground floor of the residential tower. Some shops include:

- Chamas Tacos
- McDonalds
- Criniti's Italian Restaurant
- The Meat & Wine Co
- 7-Eleven
- Subway
- Freshwater Place Wellness Medical Practice
- Kenny's Bakery
- Cafenatics
- Tinson Jewellers
- Sushi n Poke
- Five Guys
- In A Rush
- Ceylon Express
- Freshwater Barber
- Kang Eang
- KFC
- ClickCo
- Elite Sport Physiotherapy
- Haus & Co Beauty Bar

== See also ==
- List of tallest buildings in Melbourne
- List of tallest buildings in Australia
