= 171 La Trobe Street =

171 LaTrobe Street
- Interactive map of the 171 LaTrobe Street area

General information
- Location: 171 La Trobe Street, Melbourne CBD, 3000, Melbourne, Victoria, Australia
- Coordinates: 37°48′32.46″S 144°58′00.03″E
- Completed: 1991

Height
- Height: 72 m (236 ft)

Technical details
- Floor count: 13
- Floor area: 414 m^{2} (4456.26 ft^{2})

Design and construction
- Architect: Nonda Katsalidis
- Architecture firm: Axia Architecture & Interior Design (1988—1990); Fender Katsalidis Architects (1990—present)
- Awards: RAIA Victorian Chapter Merit Award, 1992

171 La Trobe Street is a building in Melbourne, Victoria, Australia, by architect Nonda Katsalidis. It is a 13–storey structure, glazed with a green glass exterior with elements overhanging the building on each side.

== History ==
The building was planned in the aftermath of the early 1990s recession in Australia, by the Cleeve Fowles Partnership which helped trigger a commercial building boom in the 1o90s. The building was designed by Nonda Katsalidis and his project team (Nick Orfanidis, Kerry Hayton, Ric Wood, Rob Wiggnall and Anthony Tosariero). 171 La Trobe Street was successfully completed in 1991 at A$12 million.

== Physical aspects ==
The project at 171 La Trobe Street occupies the corner of Russell Street, La Trobe Street and Hayward Lane. The building rises uniformly with 10 storeys of office floors from a catenary canopy over a tavern at the ground level, with a pair of triple-storey penthouses on top. The residential usage of the building is differentiated from its office counterpart by accentuation of masses protruding from the apartments on the exterior. Other distinctive features of 171 La Trobe Street include vertical shafts composed of green-glazed glass, horizontal curtain walling, vertical fins and a black cladded shear wall. Stone paneling is used to form a steep contrast with the clear green glass that clads most of the main structure of the building. In the foyer, Austral black granite clads most of the interior walls, concealing storage installed behind and the exterior of the lift.

== Functional aspects ==
With an office floorplate area of 414m^{2}, the location of the building on a city street corner allows configuration of offices, board rooms, workstations and ancillary facilities to access panoramic view and natural light. A portion of the office space has been partitioned to a floor area of 225m^{2} with a mezzanine of 70m^{2}. Other features include accessible toilets, three lifts and a basement carpark.

== Key influences and design approaches ==
Katsalidis wrote in his book titled "Three Residential Houses" that "...the instinct of the eagle to the nest high explains the skywards urge that leads to the building these houses on top of a city building". Katsalidis believes that primitive arrangements of simple and few materials are capable of eliciting a stronger and more compiling response than over-sophisticated buildings with complex features. The construction of the penthouses at the top of 171 La Trobe Street is an illustration of his urge to harmonise the privacy of residential dwellings with the hustle and bustle of a vibrant metropolitan. Katsalidis described this concept of modern living in an elevated environment as "floating swiftly above the city in a rather remote and self-confident manner."

Katsalidis incorporates nature through the creation of roof top gardens and pools. The sensitivity to respect nature in its full form is essential to comfortable and habitable living. "The physical territory may have shrunk to this patch on top of a city building", but the spirit has its boundaries extend limitless to horizon beyond. "Views that extend to a distant horizon, with Mount Macedon in one direction and the blue expanse of the bay in the other", delineate the full extent of this human domain we live in.

The main body of the building is divided into two distinct vertical components, a feature common in Katsalidis’ designs; one having rectangular windows with glazed green stone surface, and the other, a glazed green glass curtain wall.

Katsalidis’ ideas are represented through the experience of senses; i.e. based on how we interact with light, texture, density, volume and spatial qualities.

The building is substantially shaped by climatic considerations with the intention to expose the interiors towards the sky and nature. With the building situated to face the sun, translucent glass screens allow natural sunlight to perforate the whole building. High ceilings and long windows further allow natural light to easily penetrate thereby providing long hours of daylight and heat. In addition, the wind factor is regulated by filtering metal louver blades.

== Awards ==
In 1992, Katsalidis–designed building won the RAIA Victorian Chapter Merit Award.
