= Fender Katsalidis =

Australian architecture firm

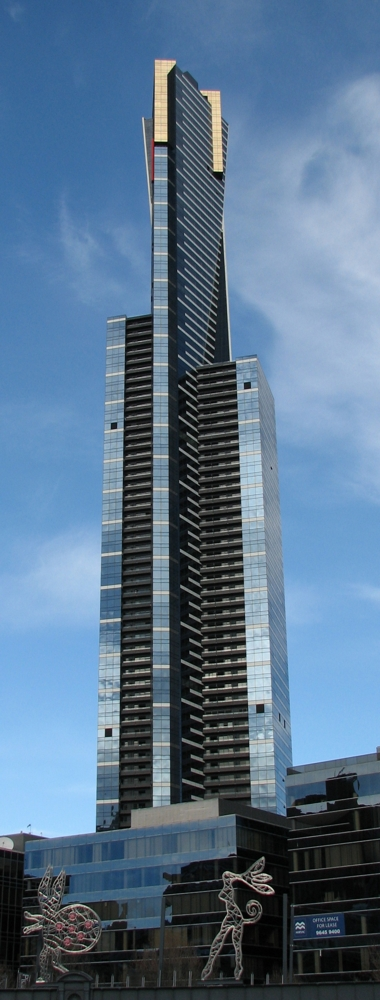
Eureka Tower, Melbourne

Fender Katsalidis (FK) is an architecture firm which originated in Melbourne, Victoria, Australia, and now has additional studios in Sydney and Brisbane. Founded by Karl Fender and Nonda Katsalidis, the firm has been notable since the early 1990s, producing many landmark buildings in Melbourne and other Australian cities. The firm has previously been known as Nation Fender, then Nation Fender Katsalidis (from 1996) and later Fender Katsalidis.

FK buildings are distinctive, often very sculptural, they also feature a variety of materials and textures such as exposed steel, left to the weather, or rough hewn timber. Australian Institute of Architects Gold Medallist Peter Wilson has described this material palette as reminiscent of "ageing boat hulls or rough woodsheds and agricultural structures built by first settlers in the Australian landscape." An early FK project involved the conversion of former grain silos in Richmond, a Melbourne suburb, into distinctive apartments featuring balconies resembling a ship's bow. FK also designed Eureka Tower completed in June 2006 in Southbank, which has become Melbourne's tallest building and one of the tallest residential buildings in the world. The NewActon Precinct in Canberra has been a long term project, winning the company the Walter Burley Griffin Award from the Australian Institute of Architects in 2015.

== Notable projects ==
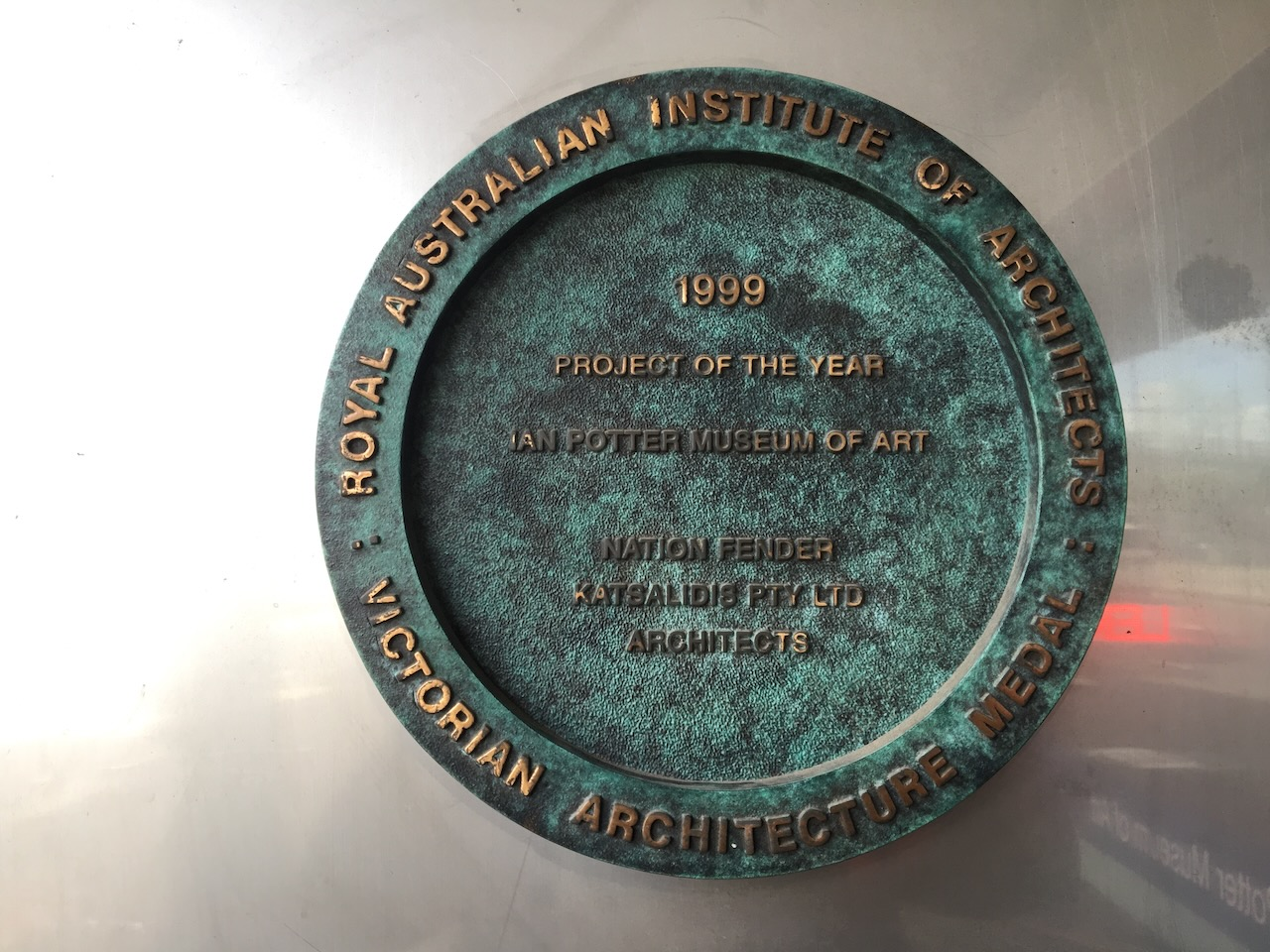
Victorian Architecture Medal, for Ian Potter Museum of Art, 1998

- Argus Centre (1991), Melbourne
- Melbourne Terrace Apartments (1994), Melbourne
- The Malthouse (Richmond Silos) (1997), Richmond
- Ian Potter Museum of Art (1998), Carlton
- Republic Tower (1999), Melbourne
- Sidney Myer Asia Centre Parkville
- HM@S Lonsdale (2003), Port Melbourne
- World Tower, World Square, Sydney (2004)
- Royal Parade Luxury Apartments (2005), Melbourne
- Eureka Tower (2007), Melbourne
- NewActon East (2008), Canberra
- Sienna Apartments (2010), Melbourne
- Museum of Old and New Art (2011), Hobart
- NewActon Precinct (2013), Canberra
- Australia 108 (2020), Melbourne
- High Society (2020), Canberra
- Merdeka 118 (2024), Kuala Lumpur, Malaysia
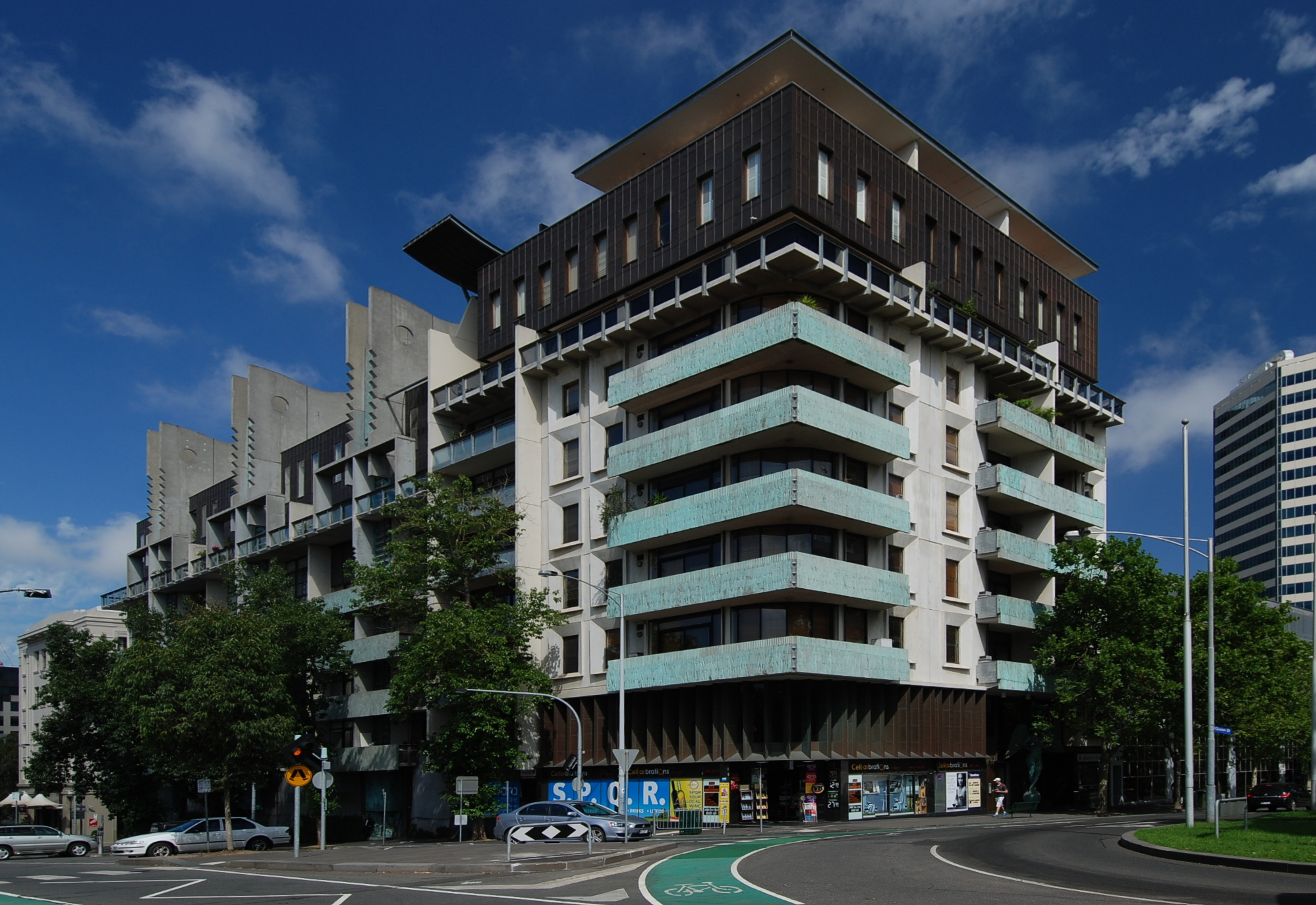
Melbourne Terrace (1994)

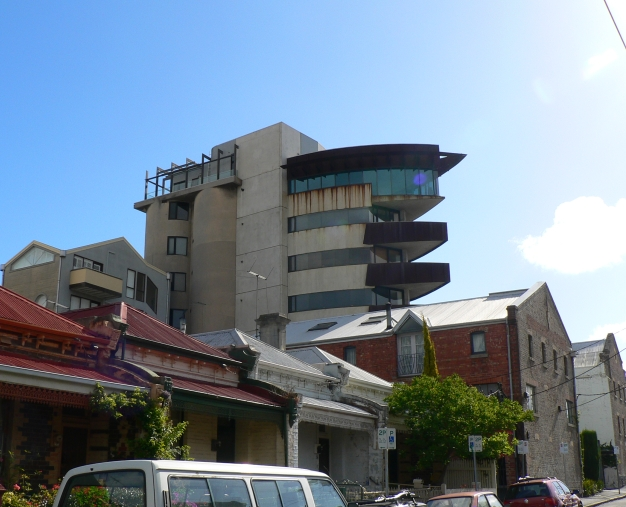
The Malthouse. Silos converted into apartments. (1997)

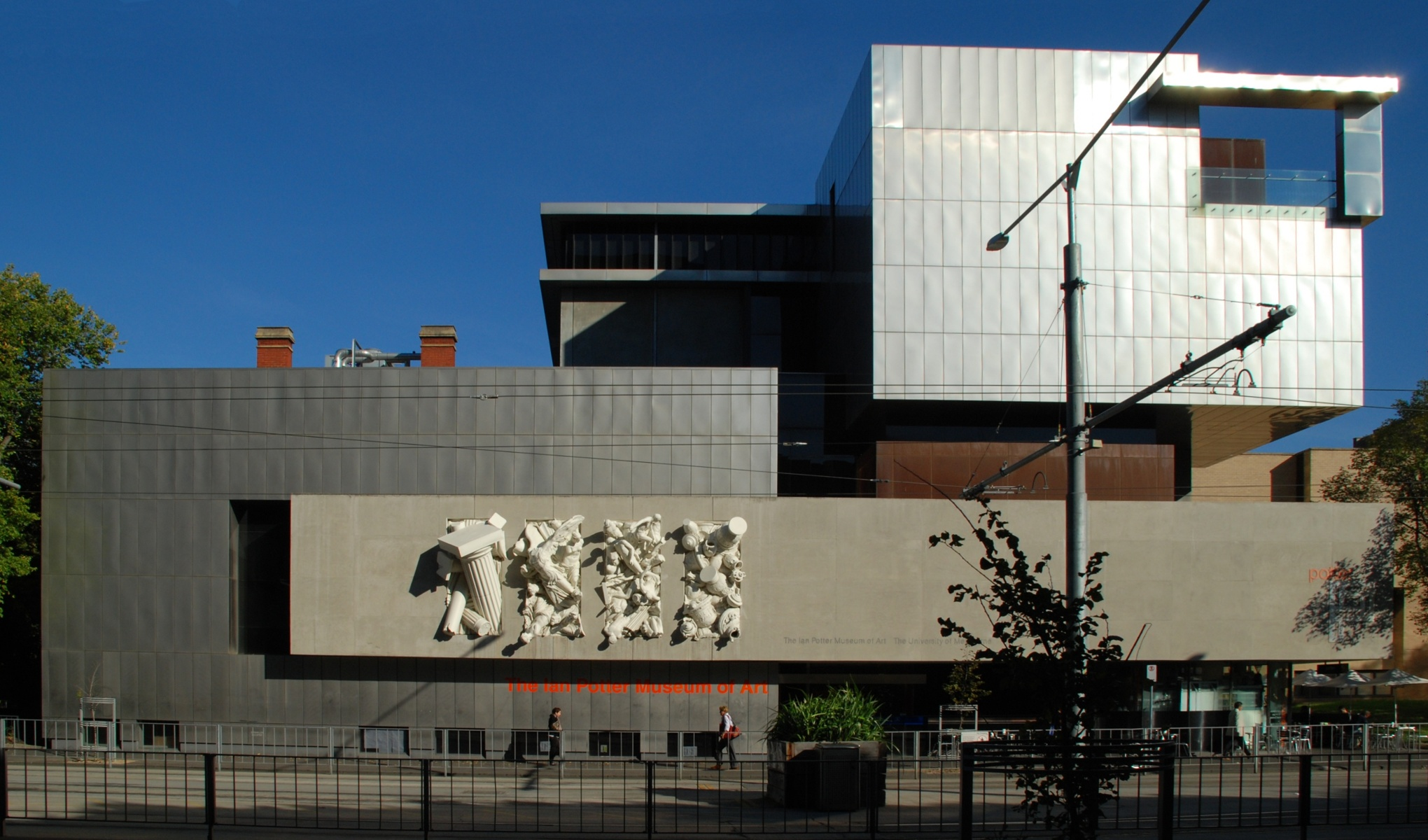
Ian Potter Museum of Art (1998)

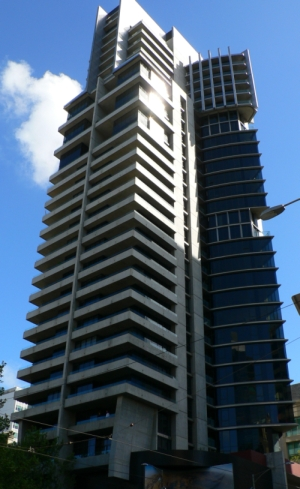
Republic Tower (1999)

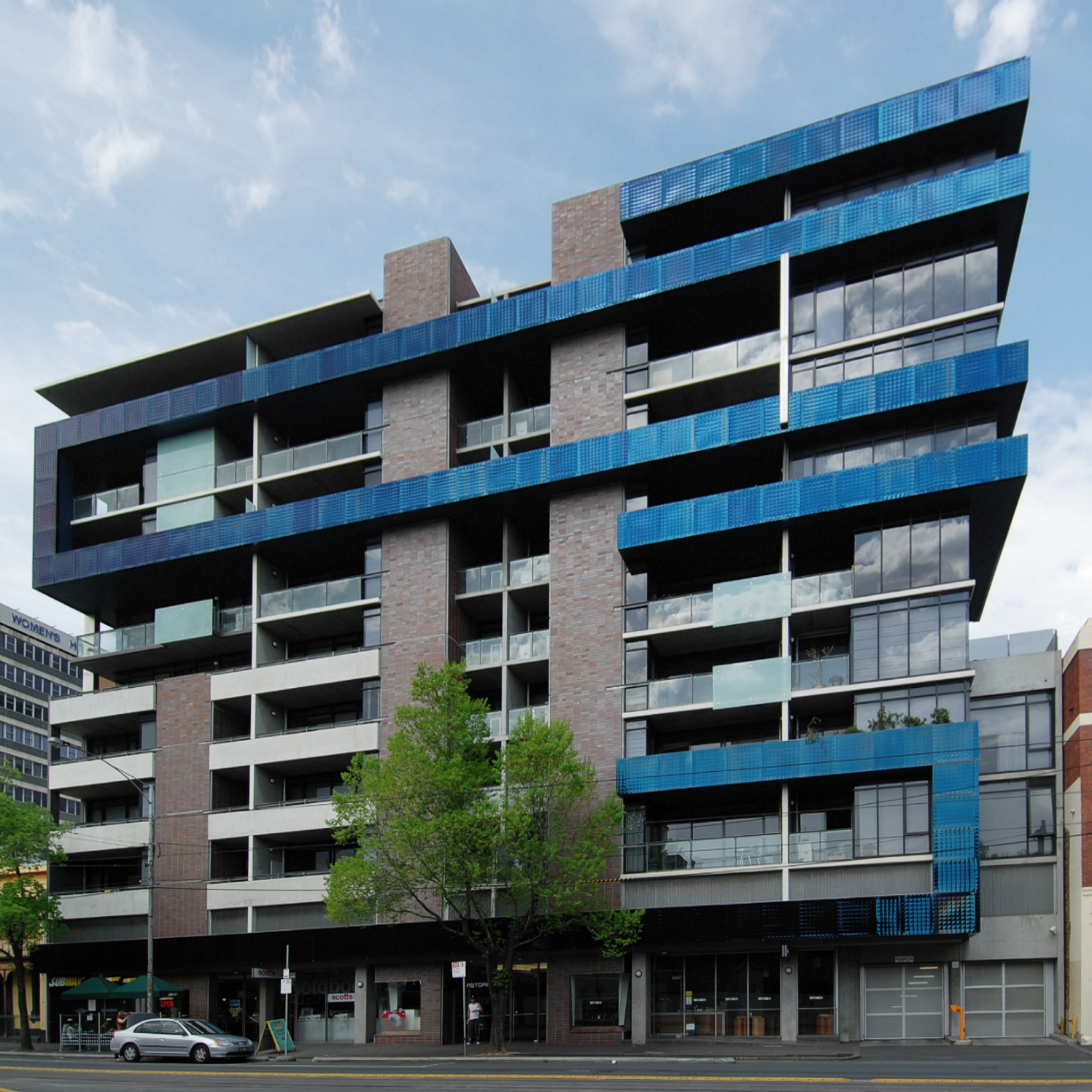
Astorial Apartments, Carlton. (2000)

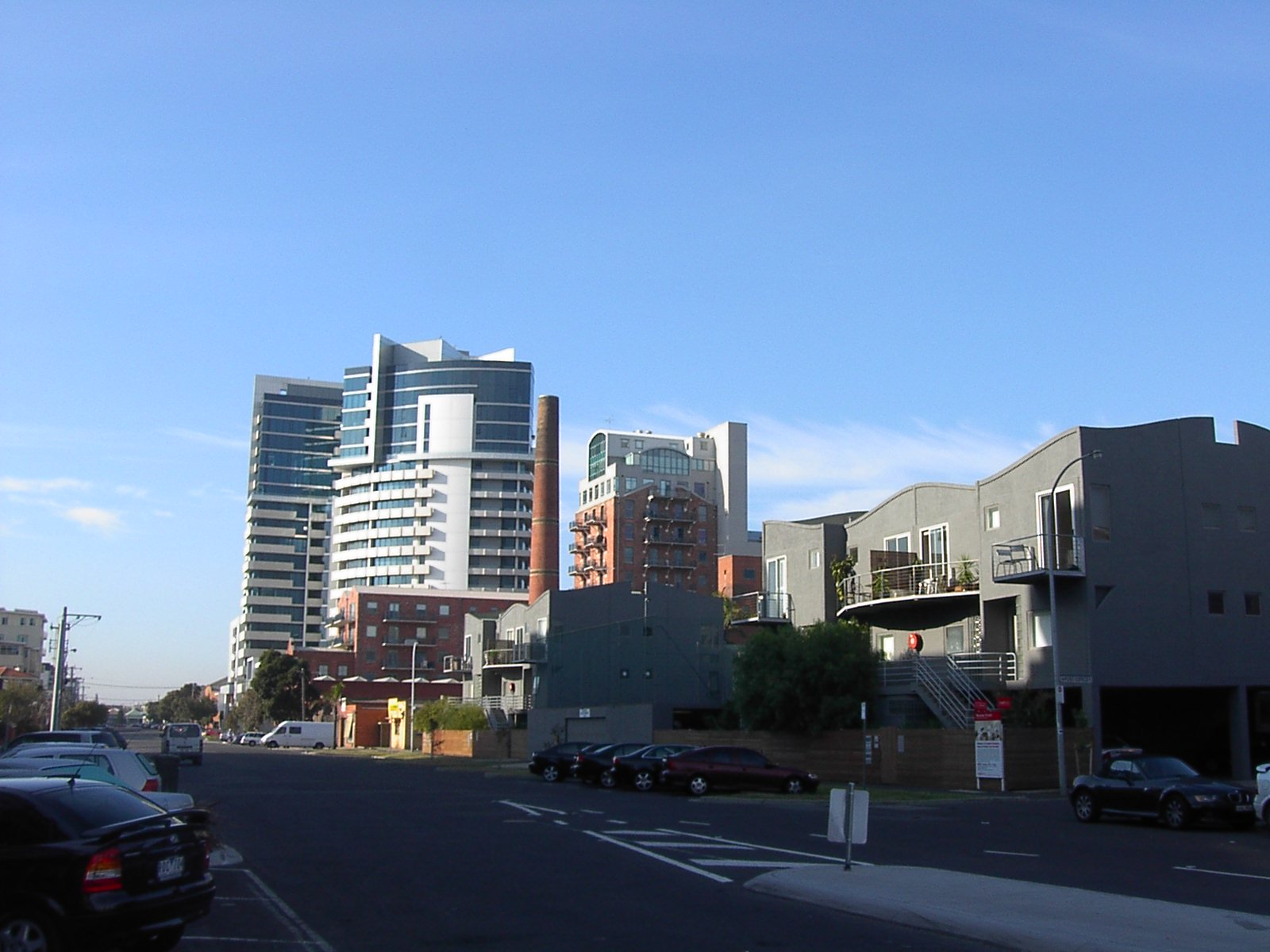
HM@S Lonsdale dominates the Port Melbourne skyline (2003)

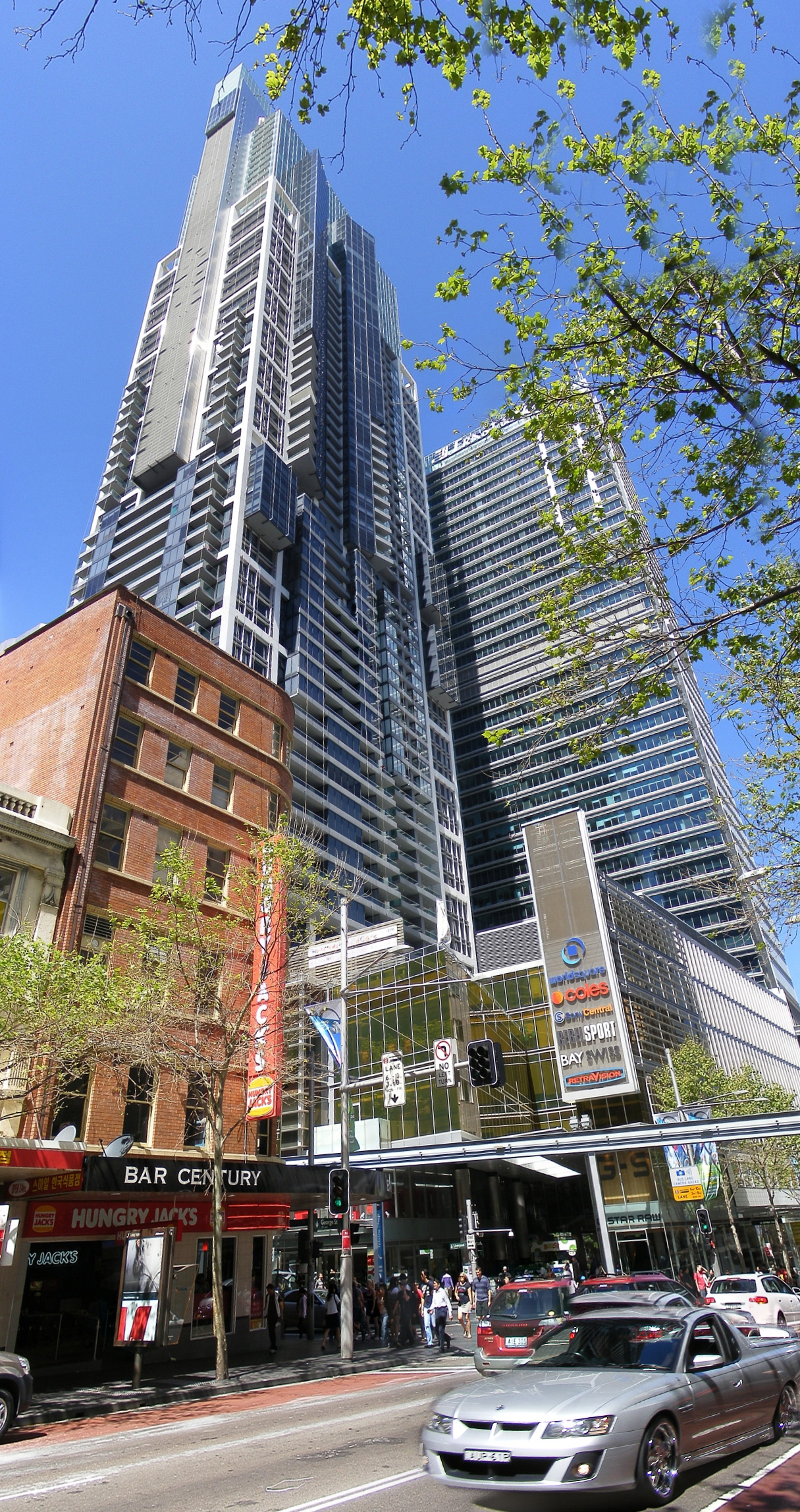
World Square, Sydney

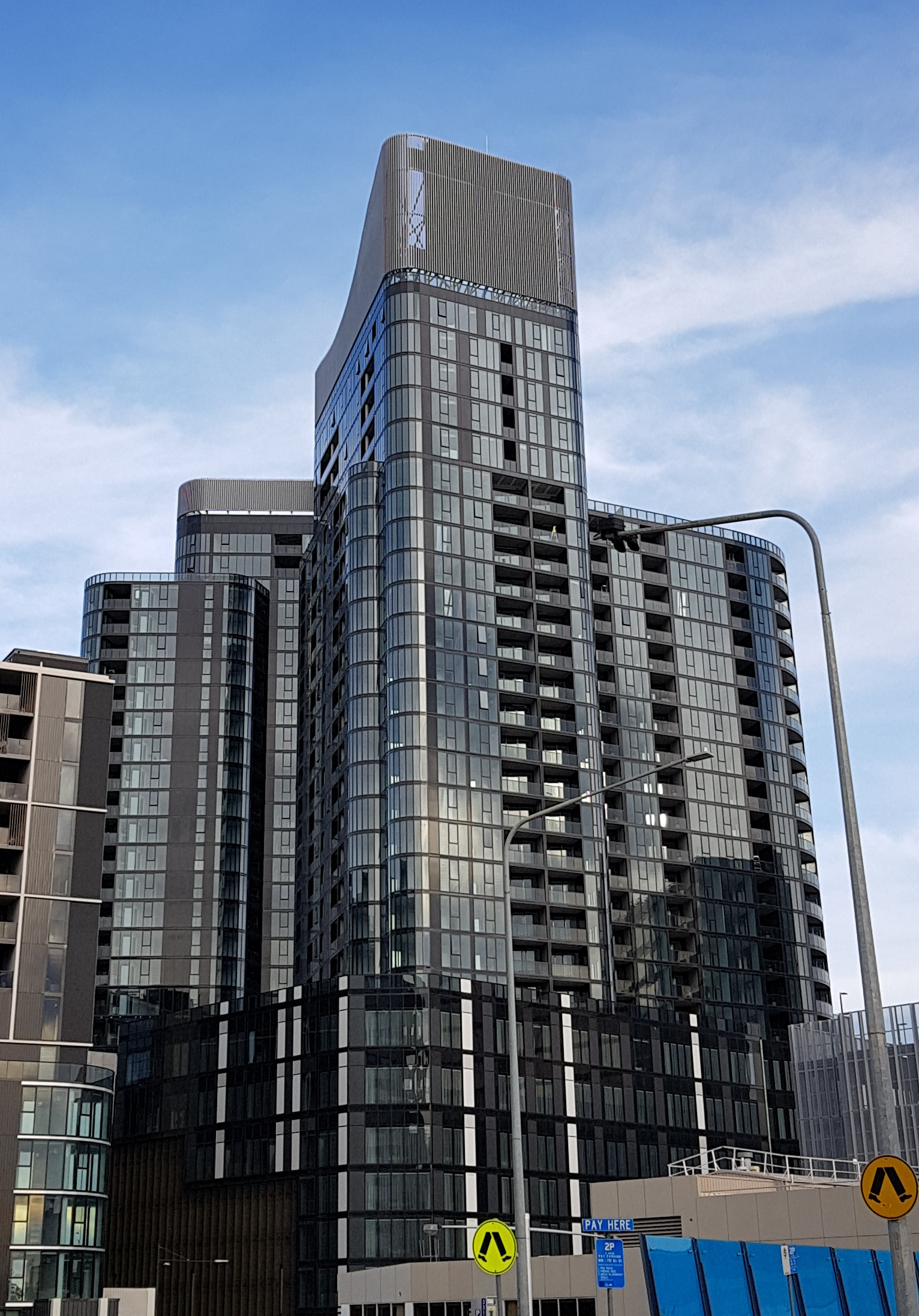
High Society (2020)

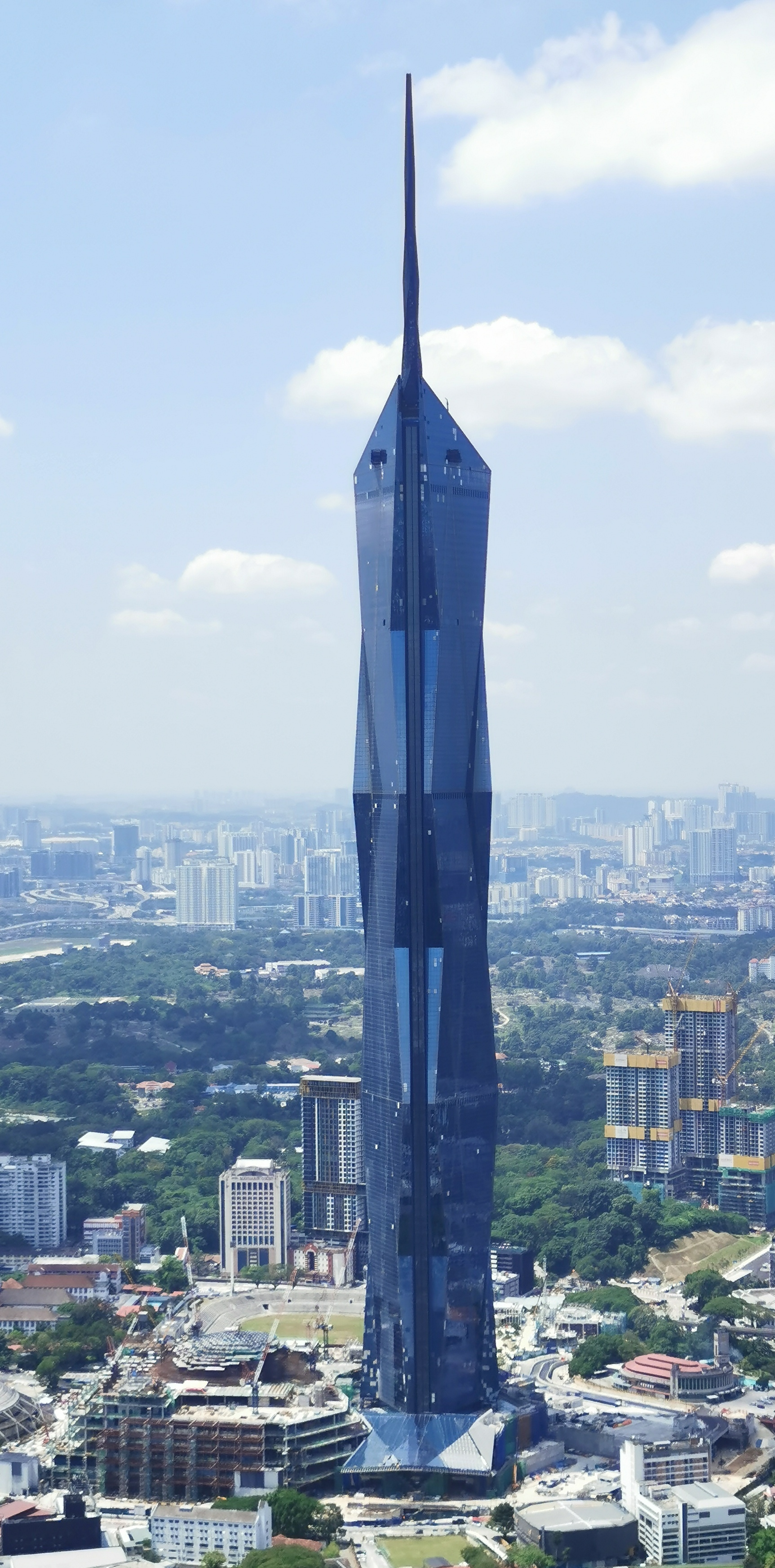
Merdeka 118, Kuala Lumpur, Malaysia

== Awards ==
- 1998 Victorian Architecture Medal for Ian Potter Museum of Art
- 1998 Melbourne Prize — Ian Potter Museum of Art
- 2002 National Commendation for Public Architecture — Sidney Myer Asia Centre, University of Melbourne
- 2007 RAIA Harry Seidler Award for Commercial Architecture — Eureka Tower, Melbourne
- 2008 AIA Award for Commercial Architecture — NewActon East, Canberra
- 2012 Sir Zelman Cowen Award for Public Architecture — Museum of Old and New Art (MONA)
