= Nonda Katsalidis =

Greek-Australian architect

Nonda Katsalidis AM
- Born: 1951 (age 74–75); Athens, Greece
- Education: University of Melbourne
- Occupation: Architect

Nonda Katsalidis AM (born 1951) is a Greek-Australian architect. He is currently a practising director of architecture firm Fender Katsalidis Architects in partnership with Karl Fender.

== Early life ==
Nonda Katsalidis was born in 1951 in Athens, Greece. He migrated to Melbourne, Australia when he was five years old, with his two-year-old brother and parents. He graduated from the University of Melbourne with a degree in architecture in 1976.

== Selected works ==
- Deutscher Fine Art Gallery and Residence, Carlton (1988)
- 171 La Trobe Street, Melbourne (1991)
- The Argus Centre, Latrobe Street, Melbourne (1991)
- St Andrews Beach House, Mornington Peninsula (1992)
- Melbourne Terrace Apartments, Franklin Street, Melbourne (1994) – a fanciful postmodern design featuring zig zag embellished exposed pre-fabricated concrete fins, use of architectural copper, and various classical sculptures at the entrance to each of the major pavilions. The building is listed as one of the Top 20 buildings in Australia of the 20th century by Architecture Australia in the December 1999 edition.
- Bendigo Art Gallery, Bendigo (1995) (redevelopment and extension)
- The Malthouse, Richmond (1997) (Fender Katsalidis)
- St Leonards Apartments, St Kilda (1997) (Nation Fender Katsalidis)
- Ian Potter Museum of Art, University of Melbourne (1998) (Nation Fender Katsalidis)
- Republic Tower, Corner Queen and Latrobe Streets, Melbourne (1999) (Fender Katsalidis)
- 51 Spring Street, Melbourne (1999) (Nation Fender Katsalidis)
- Wills Tower, Melbourne (2002) (Fender Katsalidis)
- New Quay Apartments, Melbourne Docklands (2002) (Fender Katsalidis)
- HM@S Lonsdale, Port Melbourne (2003) (Fender Katsalidis)
- World Tower, World Square, George Street, Sydney (2004) (Fender Katsalidis)
- Conder (New Quay), Melbourne Docklands (2004)
- Eureka Tower, Melbourne (2006) (Fender Katsalidis)
- 108 Flinders, 108 Flinders St Melbourne (2010) (Fender Katsalidis)
- Museum of Old and New Art, Hobart, Tasmania (2011) (Fender Katsalidis)
- Phoenix Apartments, 82 Flinders St Melbourne, site of Phoenix Hotel (2011) (Fender Katsalidis)

== Awards ==
- 1984 – RAIA (Victoria) Merit Award (Metro Brasserie)
- 1988 – RAIA Victorian Architecture Medal (Deutscher Fine Art Gallery & Residence)
- 1994 – RAIA (Victoria) Architecture Award (Melbourne Terrace Apartments)
- 1995 – City of Melbourne Building and Planning Award, City Postcode 3000 Award (Melbourne Terrace Apartments)
- 1999 – RAIA Victorian Architecture Medal, Melbourne Prize and William Wardell Award (for the Ian Potter Museum of Art)
- 2002 – RAIA Victorian Architecture Regional Prize (Bendigo Art Gallery), Victorian Architecture Award (Sydney Myer Asia Centre)
- 2021 – Member of the Order of Australia for "significant service to architecture, and to sustainable construction innovations"

== Gallery of works ==
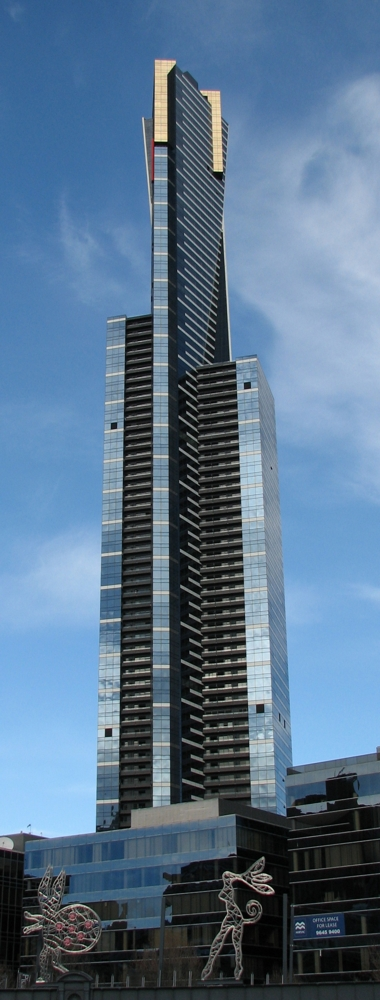
Eureka Tower

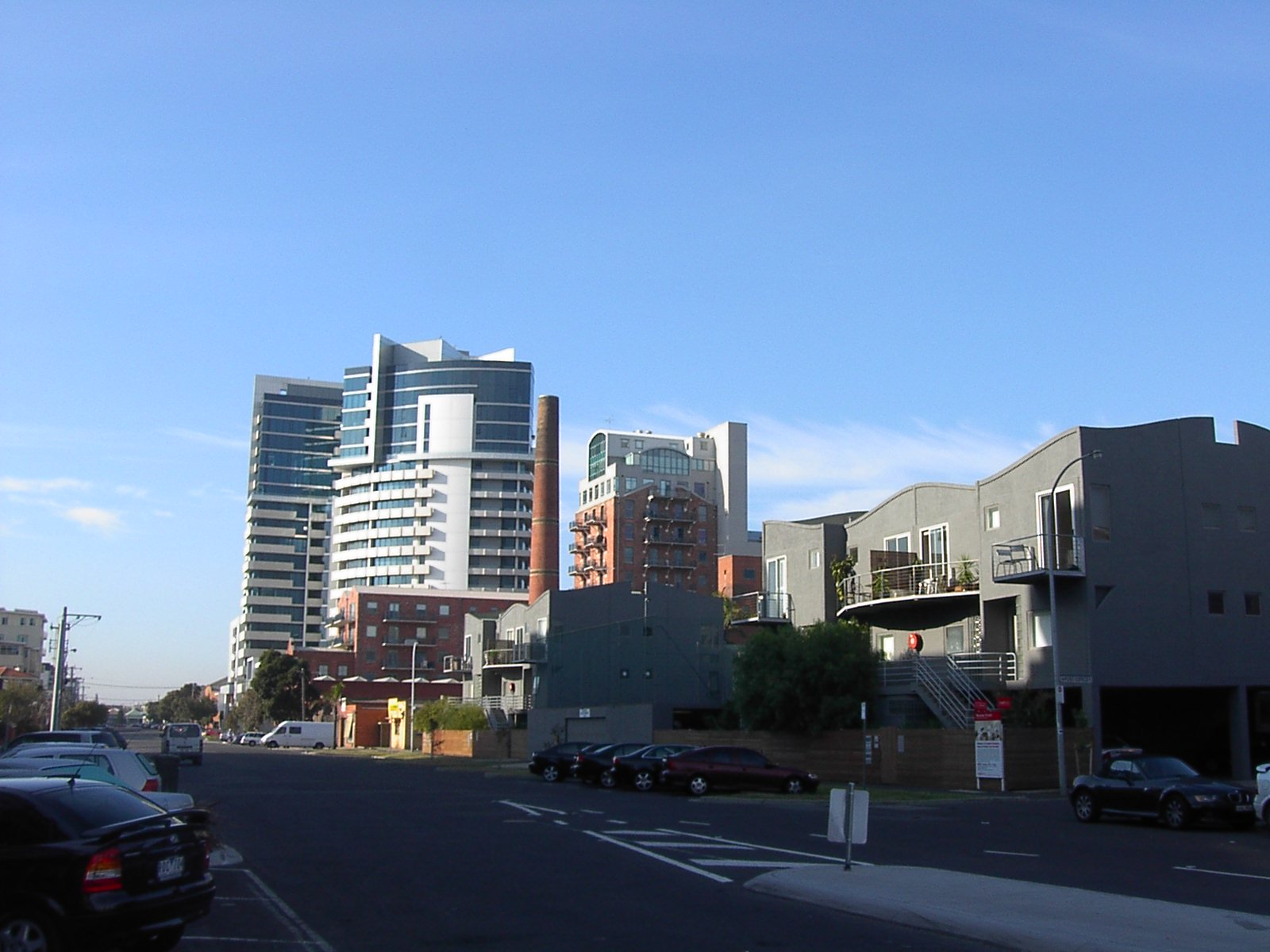
HM@S Lonsdale dominates the Port Melbourne skyline

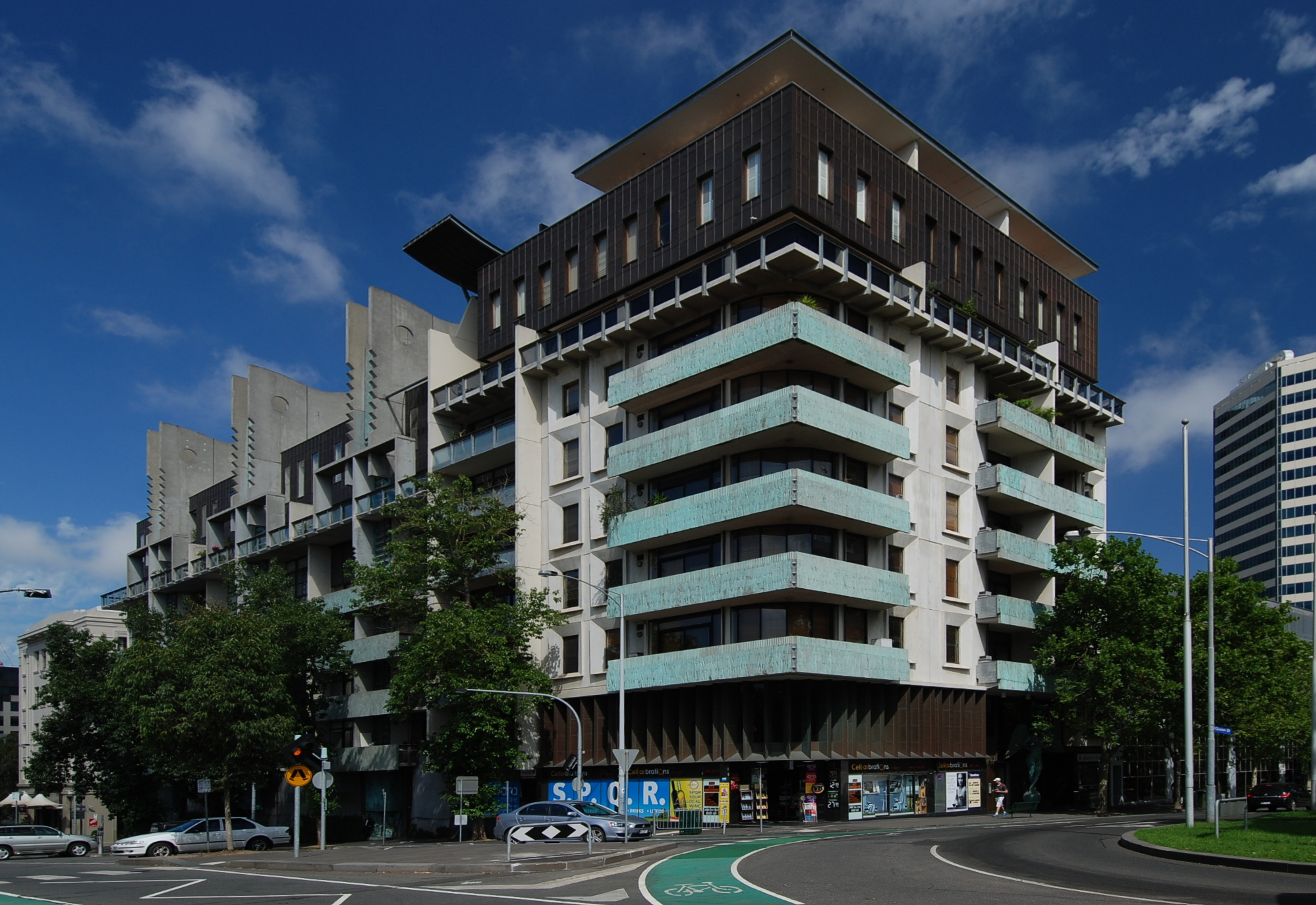
Melbourne Terrace Apartments

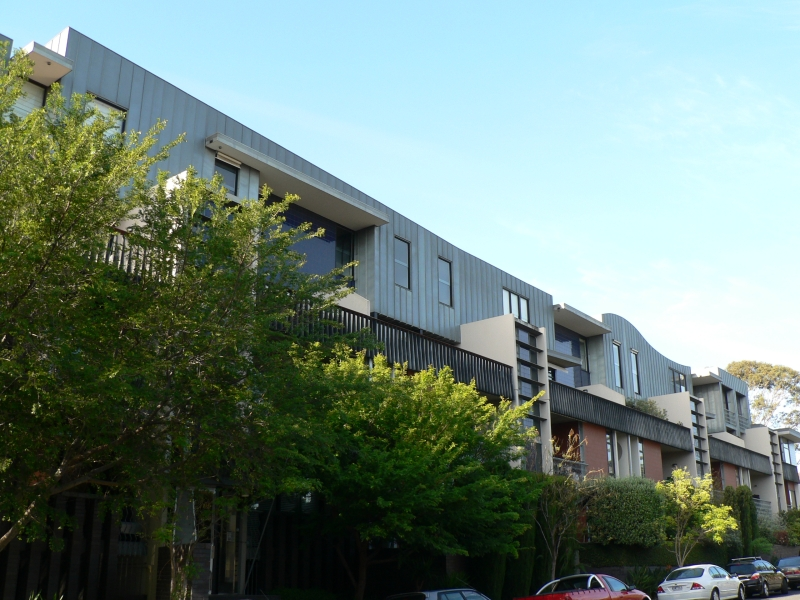
St Leonard's Apartments block 1, St Kilda

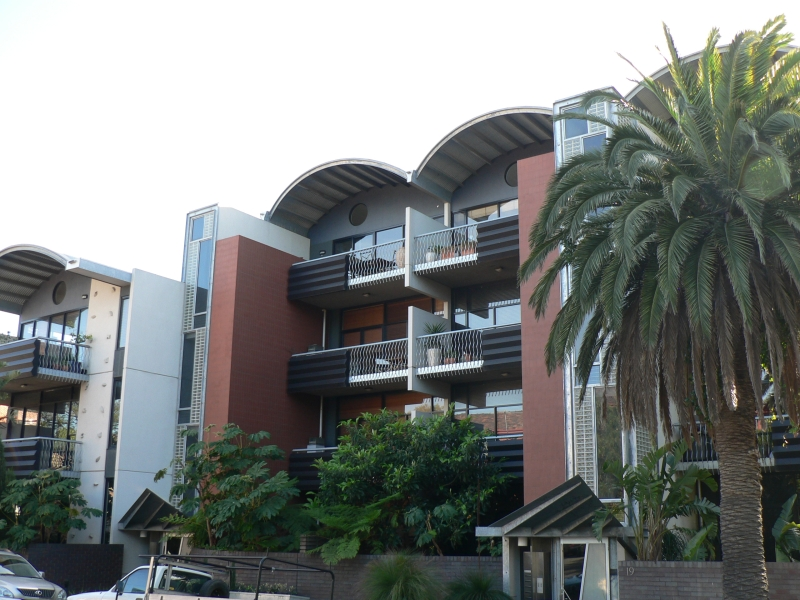
St Leonard's Apartments block 2, St Kilda

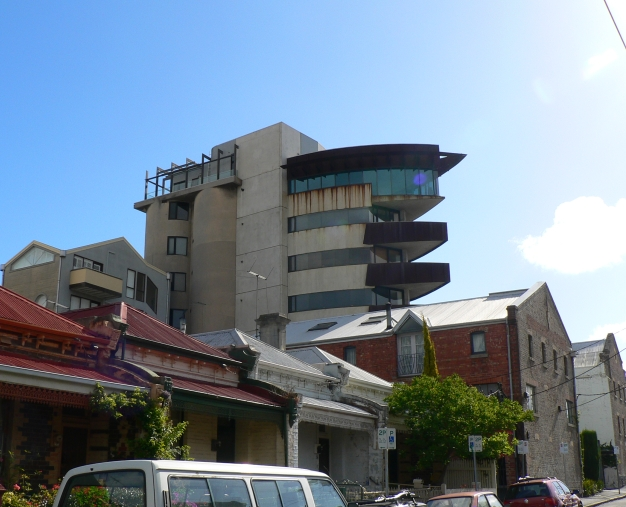
The Malthouse. Silos converted into apartments.

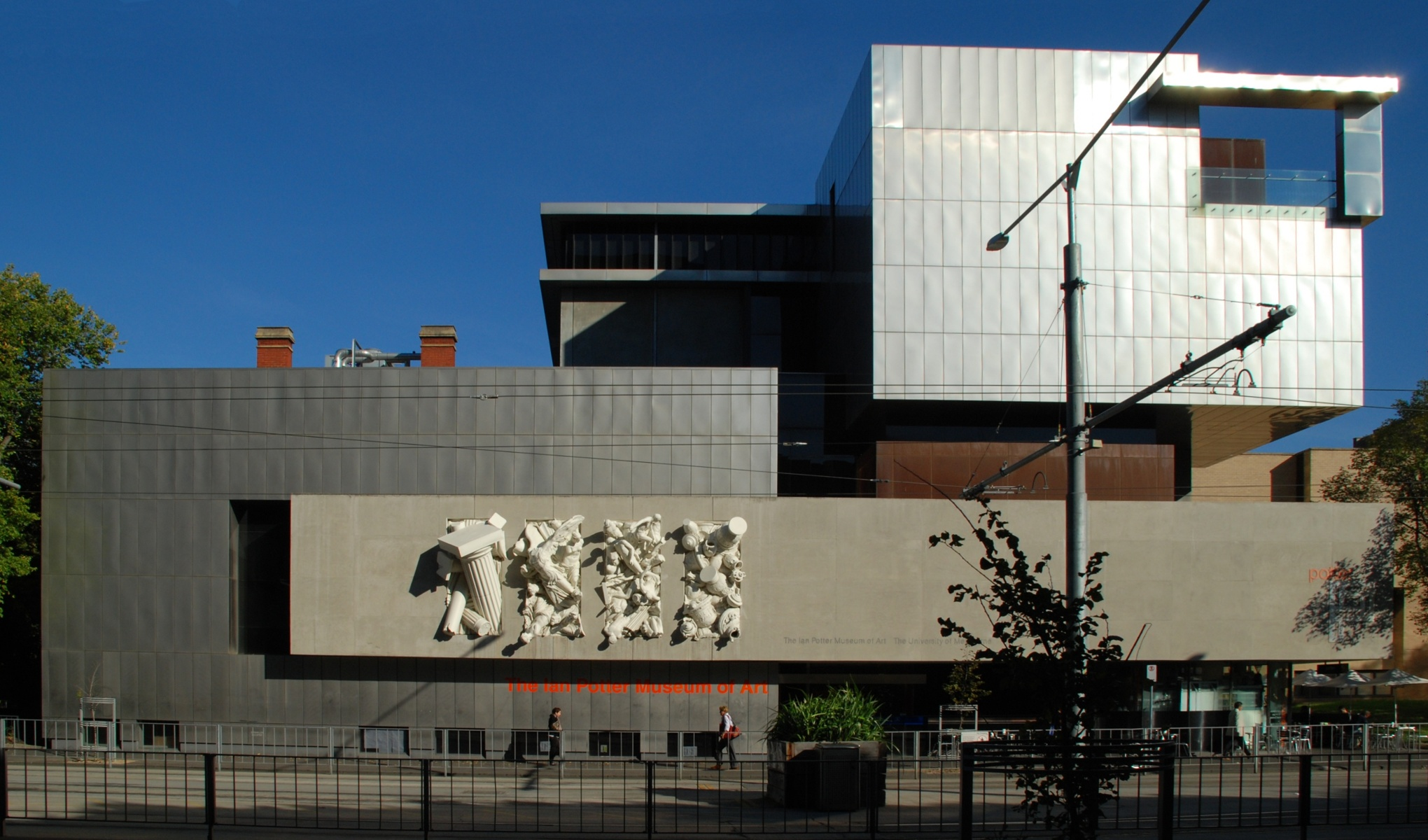
Ian Potter Museum of Art

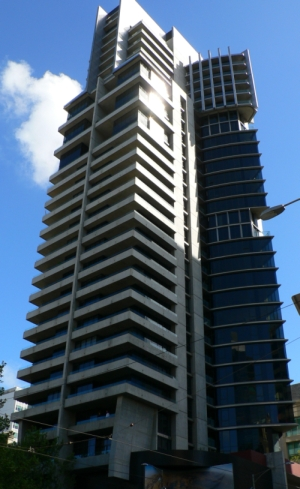
Republic Tower
