= Eureka Tower =

Skyscraper located in the Southbank precinct of Melbourne, Victoria, Australia

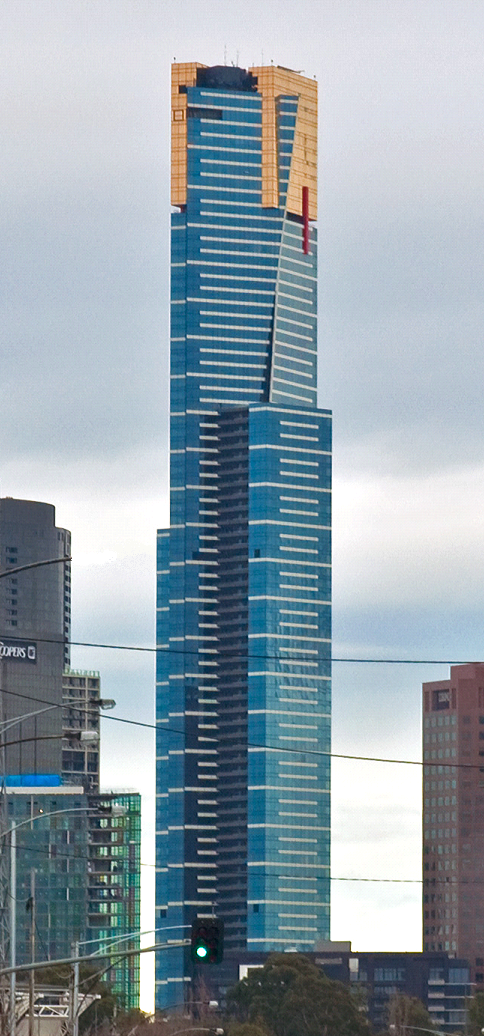
- Eureka Tower as viewed from east of Southbank, August 2010

Record height
- Tallest in Melbourne from 2006 to 2019^{[I]}
- Preceded by: 120 Collins Street
- Surpassed by: Australia 108

General information
- Status: Completed
- Type: Residential Apartment Building, Observation Tower
- Architectural style: Modern
- Location: Southbank, Melbourne, Victoria, Australia
- Coordinates: 37°49′18″S 144°57′52″E
- Construction started: August 2002; 24 years ago
- Completed: 11 October 2006; 20 years ago
- Cost: U$415m in 2006

Height
- Architectural: 297.3 m (975 ft)
- Top floor: 292.3 m (959 ft)
- Observatory: 285 m (935 ft)

Technical details
- Floor count: 91 plus 1 underground
- Floor area: 123,000 m^{2} (1,320,000 sq ft)

Design and construction
- Architect: Fender Katsalidis
- Developer: Eureka Tower Pty Ltd
- Main contractor: Grocon

Eureka Tower is a 297.3 m (975 ft) skyscraper located in the Southbank precinct of Melbourne, Victoria, Australia. Construction began in August 2002 and the exterior was completed on 1 June 2006. The plaza was finished in June 2006 and the building was officially opened on 11 October 2006. The project was designed by Melbourne architectural firm Fender Katsalidis Architects and was built by Grocon (Grollo Australia). The developer of the tower was Eureka Tower Pty Ltd, a joint venture consisting of Daniel Grollo (Grocon), investor Tab Fried and one of the Tower's architects Nonda Katsalidis.

The building's design is themed around the Eureka Stockade. It contains 556 apartments serviced by 13 lifts. Level 88 features an observation deck and level 89, a restaurant, cocktail bar and event space. The building is home to the annual Eureka Climb and a 2013 experiment involving airplants.

It was the world's tallest residential tower when measured to its highest floor, until surpassed by Ocean Heights and the HHHR Tower in Dubai. From 2006 to 2020, it was the tallest building in Melbourne, until the topping out of Australia 108. It is currently the third tallest building in Australia, behind the Q1 in Queensland and Australia 108, as well as the second tallest to roof (excluding spire) behind the latter skyscraper. As of 2016, it was the 15th tallest residential building in the world.

== Design and features ==
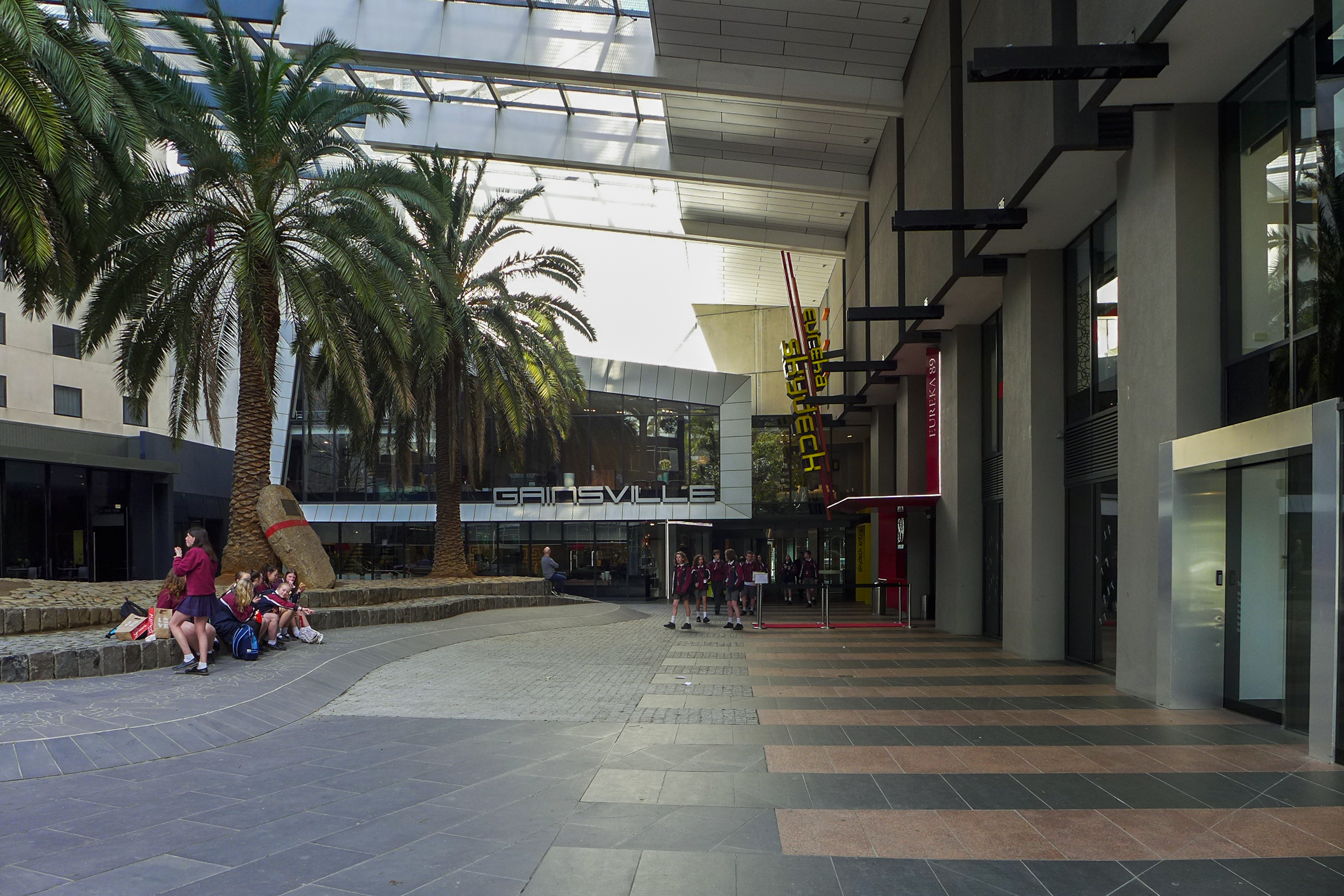
Open space outside the tower

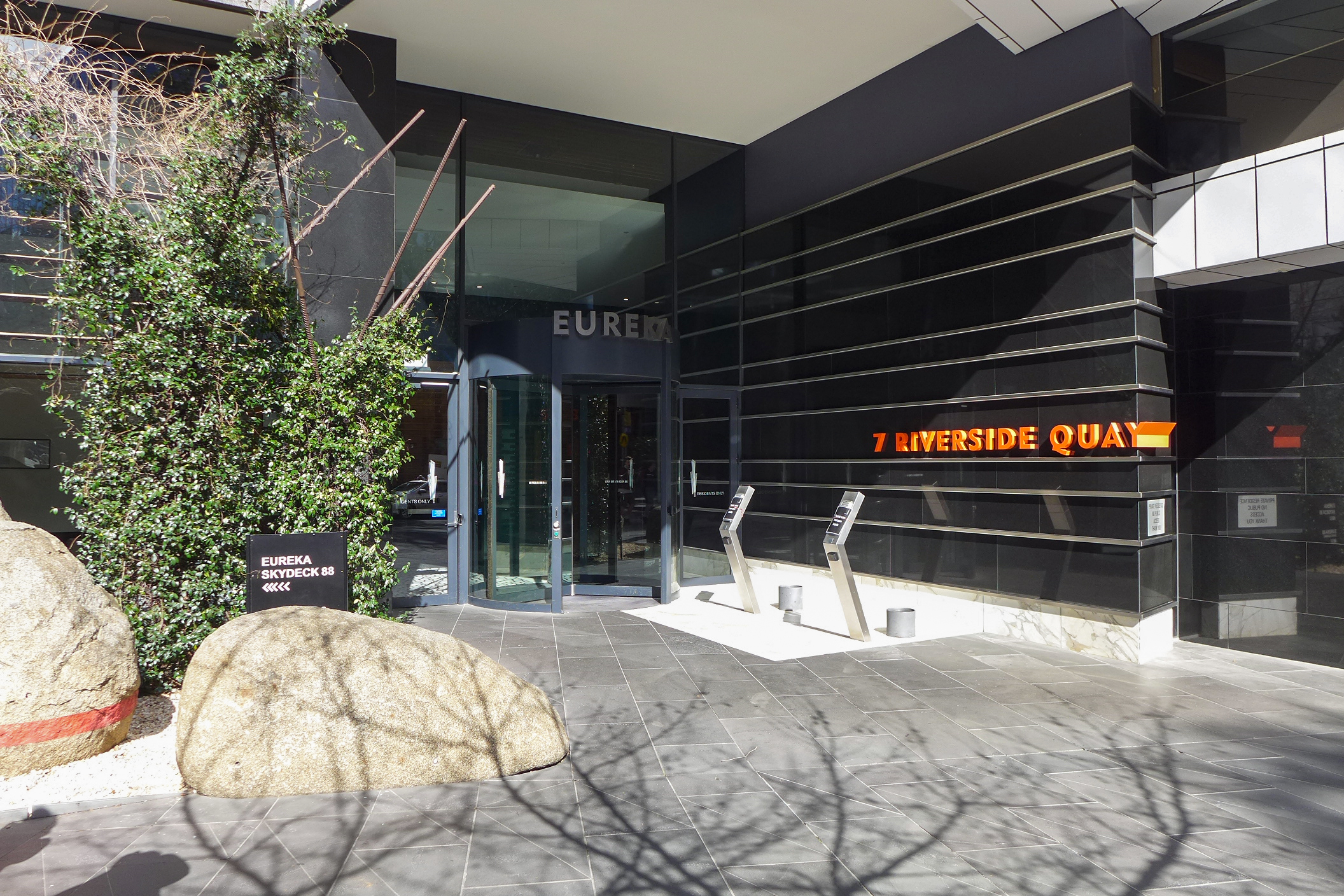
Eureka Tower Residence Entrance

Eureka Tower is named after the Eureka Stockade, a rebellion during the Victorian gold rush in 1854. This has been incorporated into the design, with the building's gold crown representing the gold rush and a red stripe representing the blood spilt during the revolt. The blue glass cladding that covers most of the building represents the blue background of the stockade's flag and the white lines also represent the Eureka Stockade flag. The white horizontal stripes also represent markings on a surveyor's measuring staff.

At the base of the tower is an art installation containing nine bees inside a white box, resembling a manmade beehive. There are two regular sized bees outside the box, and one queen bee on the top. The gold colour of the bees complements the gold at the top of the tower. The installation was created by Richard Stringer and Nonda Katsalidis, and was initially completed in December 2007. Other bees have since been added to the building, most recently in 2019.

When measured either by the height of its roof, or by the height of its highest habitable floor, Eureka Tower was the tallest residential building in the world when completed. It was also the building with the most floors available for residential occupancy in the world. The building stands 297 m (974 ft) in height, with 91 storeys above ground plus one basement level. At the time of its completion, it was one of the only buildings in the world with 90 or more storeys. It is also the third-tallest building in Australia and the second tallest building in Melbourne, behind Australia 108 which topped out in November 2019. The single level basement and first 9 floors contain car parking. The building's proximity to the water table as well as the Yarra River made the construction of a basement car park uneconomical. In all, there are 84 floors of apartments (including some floors shared between car parking and apartments), with the remainder being used for building facilities and the observation deck.

According to the ranking system developed by the U.S.-based Council on Tall Buildings and Urban Habitat, the Eureka Tower qualified as the tallest building in three of the four categories in which heights are ranked, namely height to the floor of the highest occupied floor of the building. For comparison, the Q1 apartment tower on the Gold Coast has its highest habitable floor (the observation deck), reaching a height of 235 m (771 ft), some 62 m (203 ft) lower than Eureka Tower's highest habitable floor. Q1's highest penthouse apartment is 217 m (712 ft) whilst Eureka's penthouse is 278 m (912 ft) high. However, the spire attached to the top of Q1 exceeds the Eureka Tower in the other two categories, namely "Height to the tip of spire, pinnacle, antenna, mast or flag pole" – in this case, spire – and height to architectural top of the building.

=== Specifications ===
- 556 apartments
- 13 lifts travelling up to 9 m/s (30 ft/s)
- 52,000 m^{2} (560,000 sq ft) of windows
- 3,680 stairs
- 110,000 t (110,000 long tons; 120,000 short tons) of concrete
- 5,000 t (4,900 long tons; 5,500 short tons) of reinforced steel
- Building weighs 200,000 t (200,000 long tons; 220,000 short tons)

Floors 82 to 87, marketed as Summit Levels, contain only one apartment per floor, each with an original price of A$7 million for the unfurnished floor space alone.

The highest floors of the tower house an observation deck (level 88), restaurant (level 89), communication rooms and balcony (90) and water tanks (90 and 91). A system of pumps constantly moves water between the two 300,000-litre tanks to counteract wind-induced oscillations.

== Observation deck (Melbourne Skydeck) ==
The observation deck, currently branded as Melbourne Skydeck and previously known as Eureka Skydeck and Skydeck 88, occupies the entire 88th floor of the Eureka Tower and is the highest public vantage point in a building in the Southern Hemisphere at 285 m (935 ft). It opened to the public on 15 May 2007. An entry fee applies to access the Skydeck.

The Skydeck features twenty viewfinders that help visitors to pinpoint numerous significant landmarks around all parts of Melbourne, along with several free binoculars. There is a small outside area called The Terrace which is closed in high winds. There is also a glass cube called The Edge, which extends itself 3 metres from the building to hang over the edge of the tower and add to the viewing experience.

On 10 January 2005, Grocon, the firm building Eureka Tower, proposed adding a 53.8 m (177 ft) communications mast/observation tower. The proposal is currently before the local planning commission. This mast would be a significant structure, used for providing an adventure climb to the tip of the summit.

On 16 April 2006, a new proposal was announced that the construction company and developers were considering options for the building to have a "skywalk" that would take daring people up 350 m (1,150 ft) high. The proposed structure may also include a communications tower.

=== The Edge ===
The Skydeck features The Edge – a glass cube which projects 3 m (9.8 ft) out from the building with visitors inside, suspended almost 300 m (980 ft) above the ground. When one enters, the glass is opaque as the cube moves out over the edge of the building. Once fully extended over the edge, the glass becomes clear.

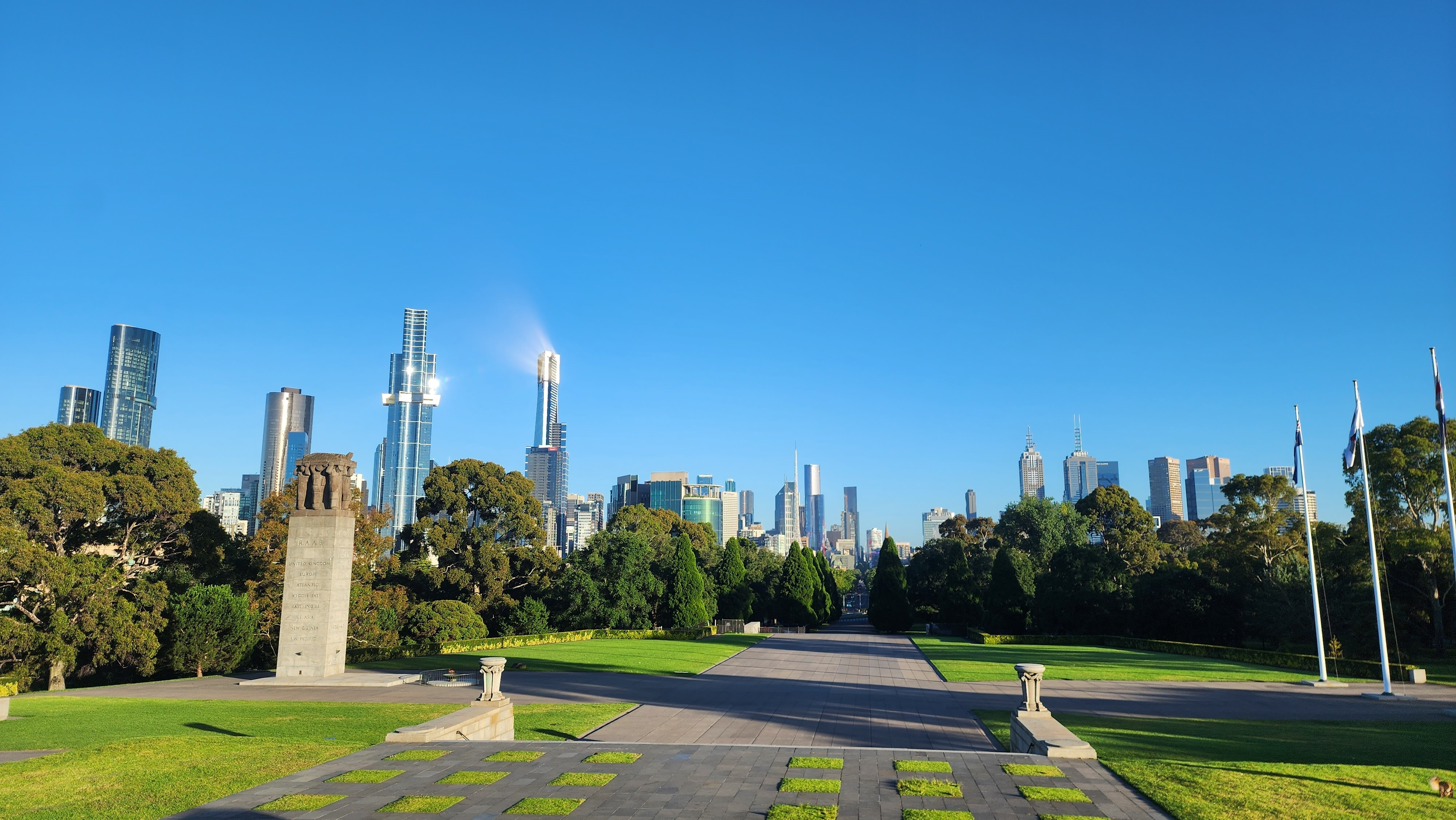
The best time to see the golden sun-ray of Eureka Tower is from late November to early February early in the morning.

== Construction ==
Construction began August 2002 and took 4 years and 2 months.

The tower was built using reinforced concrete using a slipform method. Eureka Tower's lift core superseded the height of Rialto Towers on 9 November 2004.

On 23 May 2006, the crane on top of the tower was dismantled by a smaller crane, which was dismantled by a smaller crane that could be taken down the service elevator.

Eureka Tower has 24 carat (99.9%) gold plated glass windows on the top 10 floors of the building. Installation of the gold glass was completed in March 2006. Apartment owners and tenants had taken up residence in the building between Ground Level and Level 80 as of July 2006.

On 11 October 2006, the tower was officially opened by then Premier of Victoria, Steve Bracks.

=== Construction methods ===
A 2-floor Grocon-Lubeca jumpform system was used to halve work time, concrete and joints required in the core, as well as increasing structural integrity.

Grocon purchased the Singapore company Lubeca in 2000, and then did more R&D to design the 2-floor jumpform system.

== Eureka Climb ==
Since 2012, the Eureka Climb event has been held annually. Participants climb 1642 steps (all 88 floors) to the observation deck. The current record is 7 minutes and 34 seconds for men, set by Mark Bourne in 2013; and 9 minutes and 33 seconds for women, set by Alice McNamara in 2011.

=== Air plant experiment ===
From June 2013, a team of researchers placed Tillandsia airplants on four locations on the tower. Two different species were placed at four levels: 56, 65, 91, and on top at level 92. These plants grow with no soil or watering / nutrient system and on Eureka Tower were exposed to the elements where they proved to grow through winter, saw winds over 200 km/h (120 mph) and a hot dry summer. Not all plants survived. Those on eastern aspects died because of lack of rain. However, plants in the most exposed sites, facing west and on the open roof sites have survived and flourished. The plants have been regularly checked over a number of years (last check December 2021) and have grown into resilient colonies. As far as can be ascertained this is the highest building with plants on and the experiment paved the way for utilising Tillandsia on high-rise buildings.

== Gallery ==
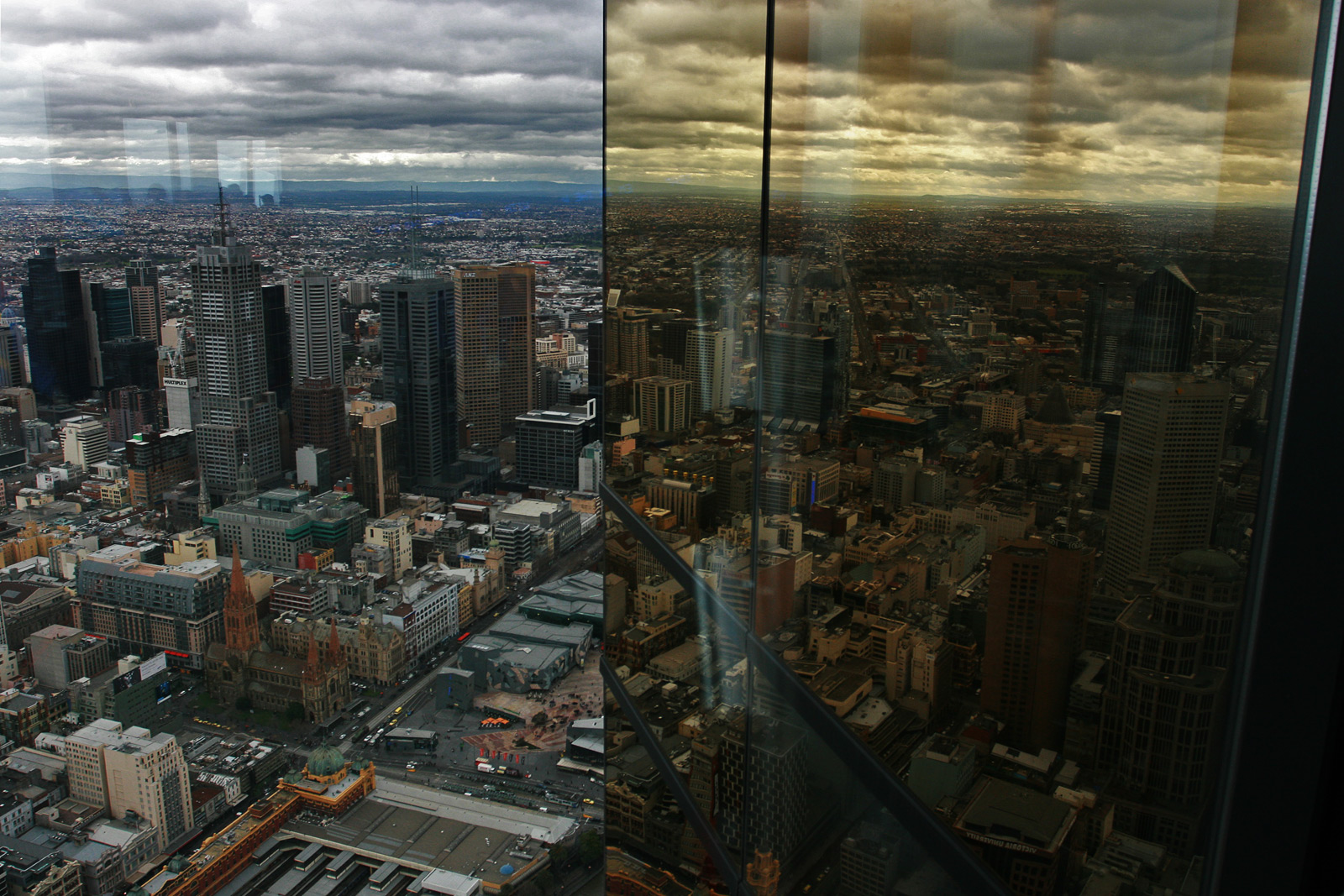
Looking north-east over Melbourne CBD from the observation deck, with reflections in the tower's gold plated windows

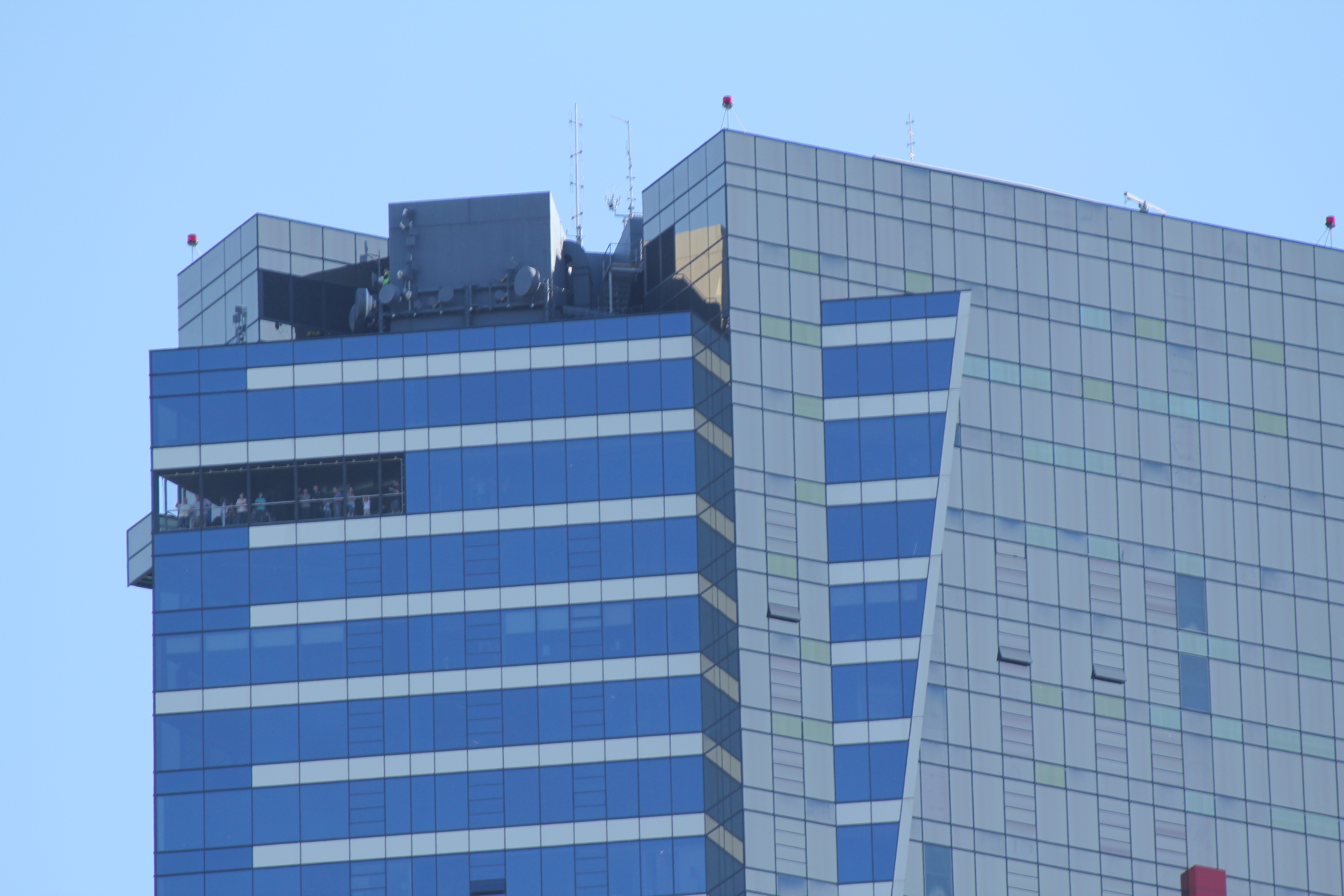
The Terrace as seen from ground, The Edge observation cube seen at left

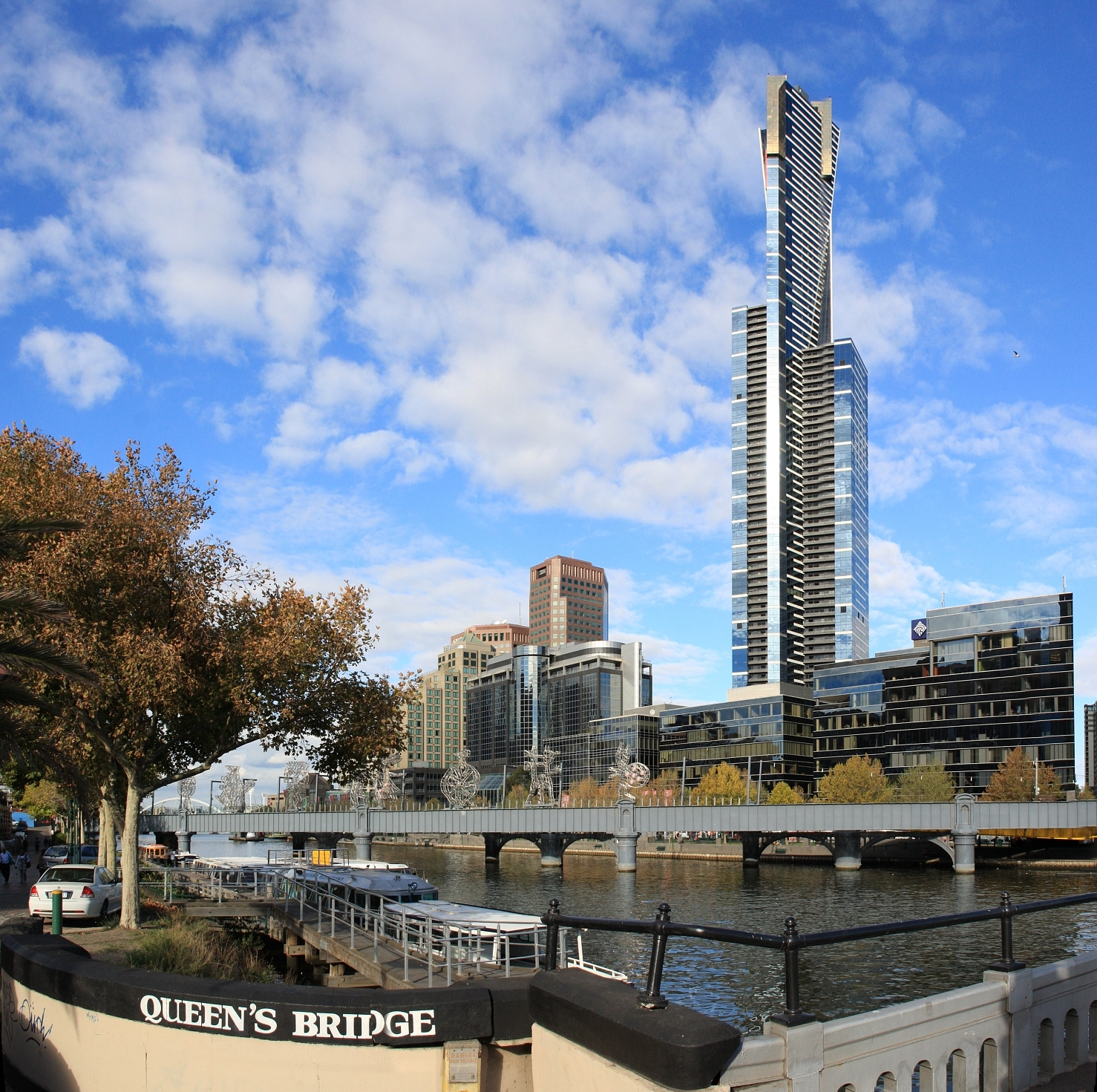
Eureka Tower from across the river

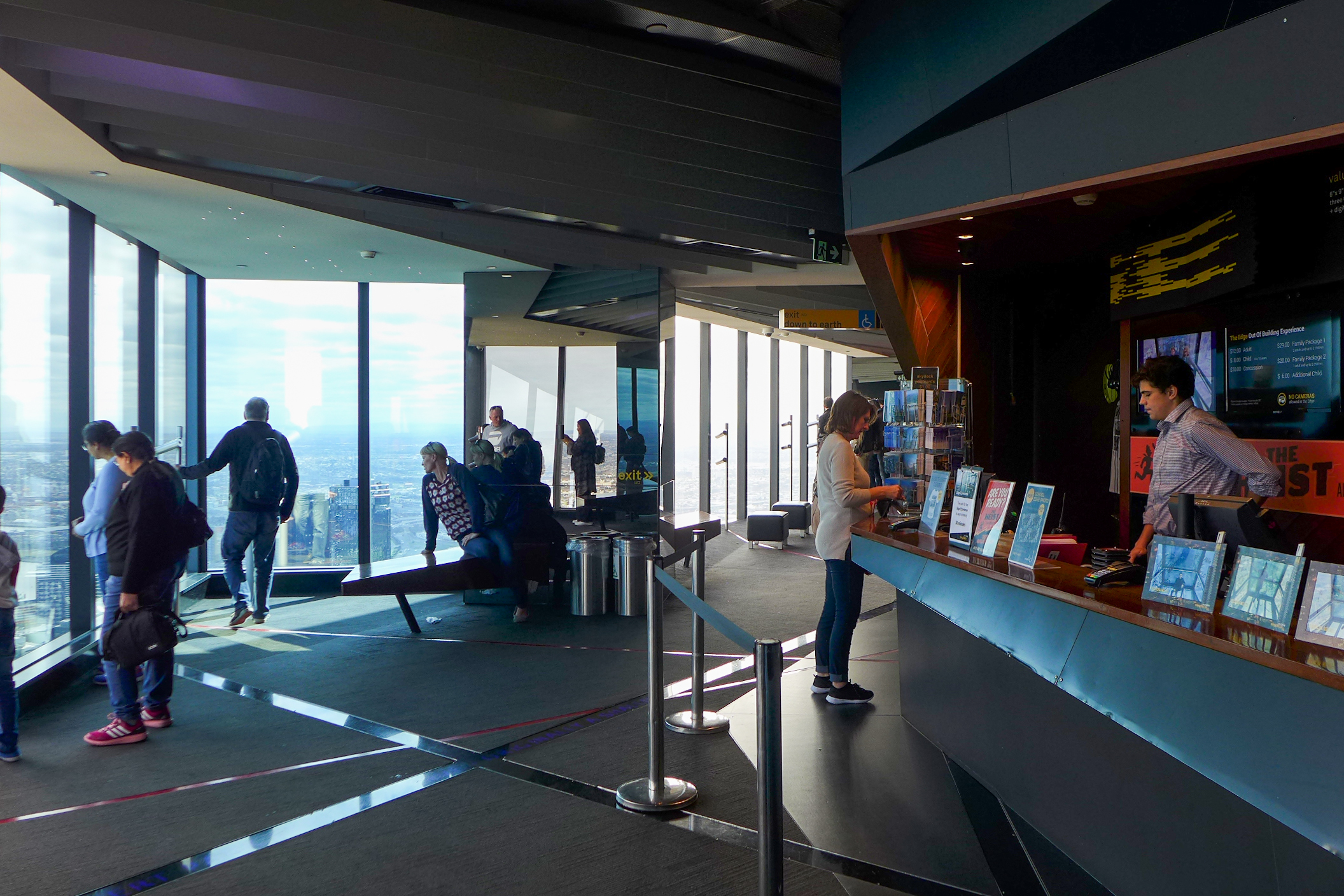
Observation deck interior

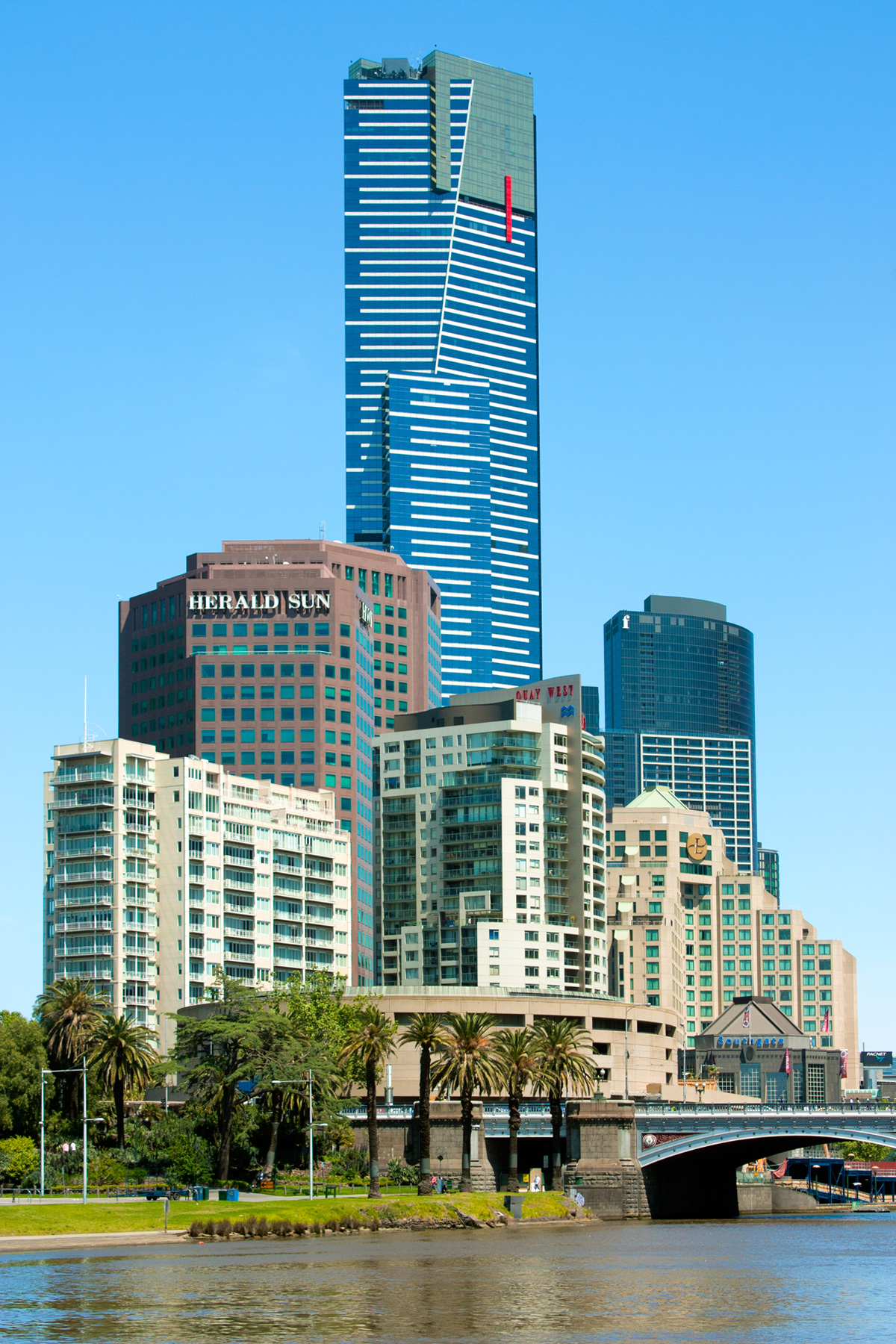
Eureka Tower seen from a bridge over the Yarra River

== See also ==
- List of tallest buildings in Melbourne
- List of tallest buildings in Australia
- Australia 108
