= Argus Centre =

Coordinates: 37.810358°S 144.960672°E

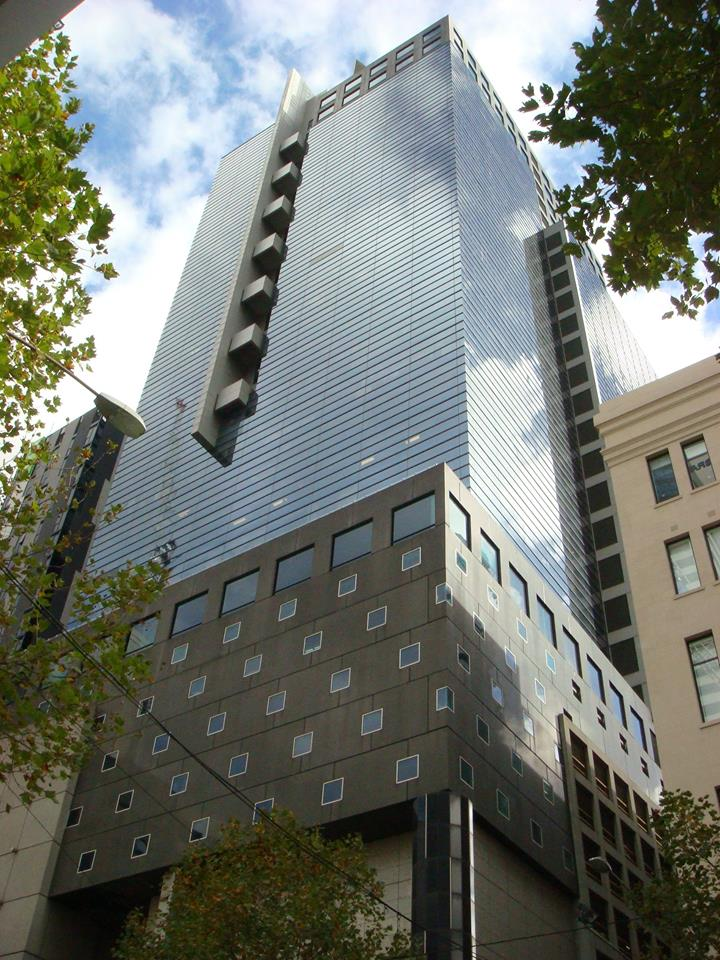
- Street level photo of Argus Centre
- Interactive map of the Argus Centre area

General information
- Type: Highrise office building
- Architectural style: Postmodernist
- Location: Melbourne, Victoria, Australia, 300 La Trobe Street
- Construction started: 1991
- Completed: 1993
- Cost: $64 million AUD

Height
- Height: 144 metres (472 ft)

Technical details
- Floor count: 34

Design and construction
- Architect: Nonda Katsalidis

The Argus Centre is a postmodernist highrise office building situated on the corner of La Trobe and Elizabeth streets, Melbourne. It was designed by architect Nonda Katsalidis whilst he was a director of AXIA Pty Ltd for client Ryssal Three. The building was constructed between 1991 and 1993 with a contract value of AUS $64 million. The current value of the building is $173.9 million.

The Argus Centre is a separate but adjacent building to the Argus Building next to it–which was constructed in 1926 and was the former premises of The Argus newspaper for 30 years (1926 – 1956). It is opposite to Melbourne Central Shopping Centre and railway station, in the Flagstaff precinct of the North of the Melbourne central business district. The building underwent refurbishment in 2012. The building was originally used as an office and carpark space, which to this day has not changed. The Argus Centre is a significant building in Australian Architecture as it was one of the finest office tower buildings of the time, managing to explore intercepting masses, with precision and decisiveness.

== Description ==
The Argus Centre is a 34-storey office building achieving 132m in height to its roof, and 144m in height to its pinnacle. There is public access to its ground level foyer and Klik's café which has been split into two separate ground floor serving areas – one circular area in the rotunda, and one rectilinear area opposite the rotunda with the foyer in between these areas. The rotunda forms the elliptical cone bridge between the Argus Centre and the Argus Building, and was the design result based upon wind tunnel tests. The building has 520 carspaces over 10 levels. The buildings carpark is sloping which gives a distorted perspective view of the design. The Argus Centre is composed of various geometric rectilinear shapes assembled such that the building looks different from numerous angles, and resembles a number of buildings unified into one mass. The building appears to be one big collage of shapes cutting across each other in different finishes.

The building is 1,487 square metres in size. One square metre is worth $5,259, of this floor space, Telstra holds the lease for 23,482 square metres over levels 17 to 34, which is about 70 per cent of the building.

== Key influences and design approach ==
Nonda Katsalidis refers to his peers work as a key influence in his design approach for the Argus Centre. In particular Wood Marsh architects, and the TAC house at 222 Exhibition Street, Melbourne by Denton Corker Marshall architects. He is also influenced by the work of modernists in the late 20th century and the development of modernism. In this area Nonda Katsalidis is particularly interested in the work of Spanish architects. The design approach is very direct and disciplined and has been noted by some, as seeming to be the work of one man with a specific vision. Nonda Katsalidis has referred to his own work as "a response to a practical requirement and the context into which it will be placed". and stated that he likes to include "a strong sense of scale and proportion, which creates a sense of rigour, a sense of control" in his work. His work on city buildings like the Argus centre is a look at the overall city rather than the Argus centre itself, as Nonda attempts to "influence the way in which the city evolves". Nonda Katsalidis also has a big interest in sculpture and art and takes inspiration from this for his own buildings.

== Gallery ==
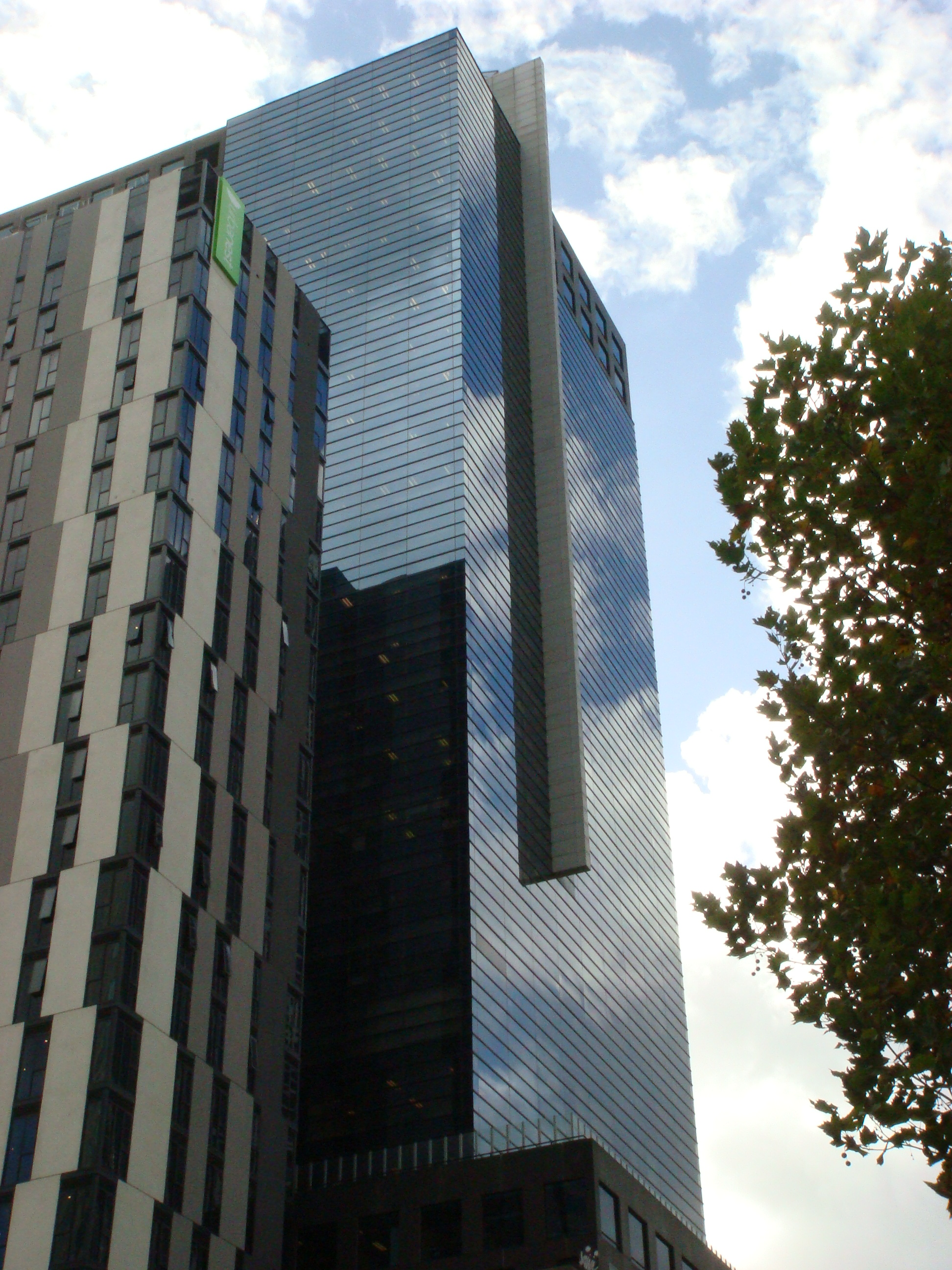
Photo of Argus Centre facade taken from side

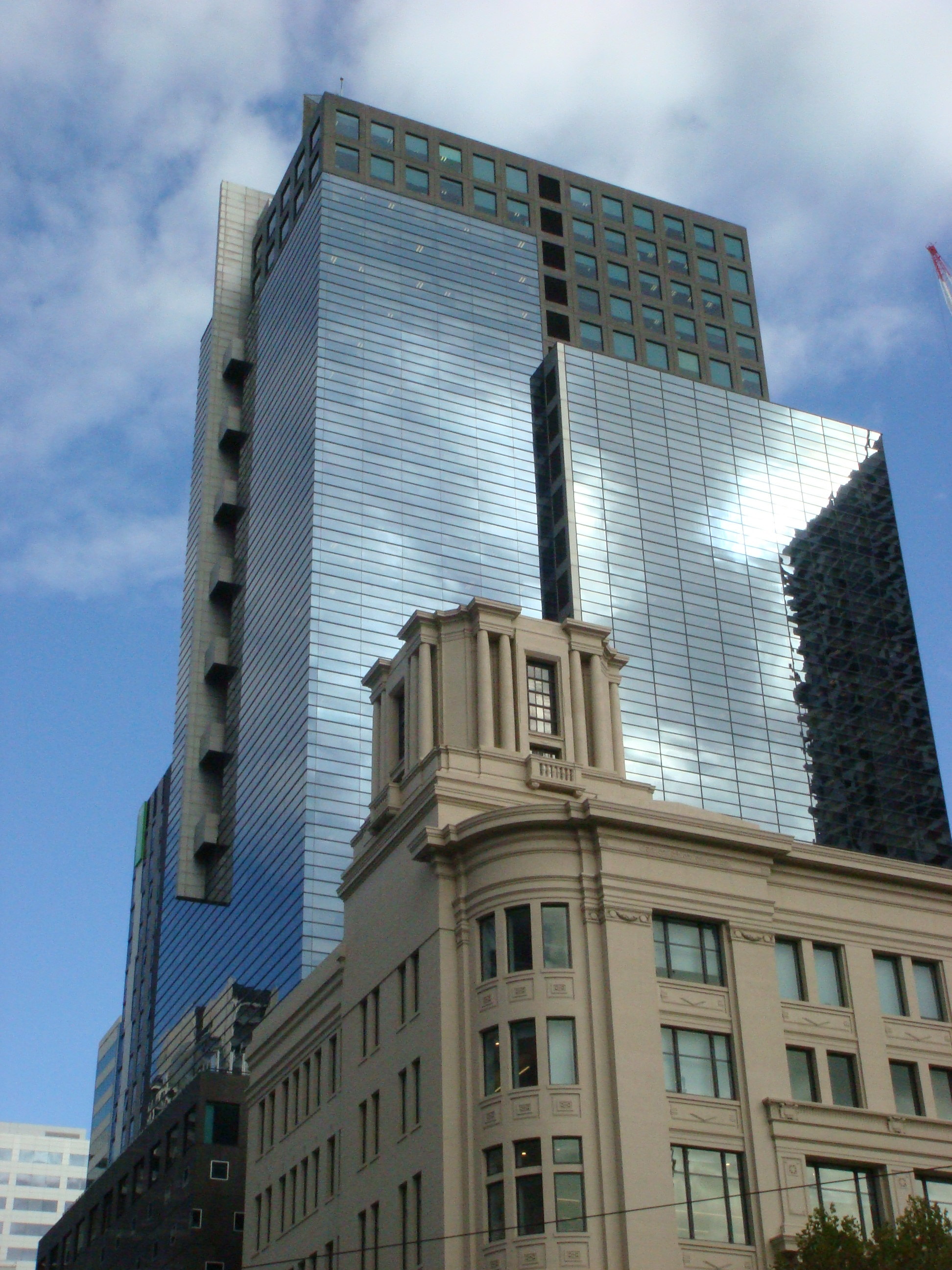
Side view of Argus Centre Facade

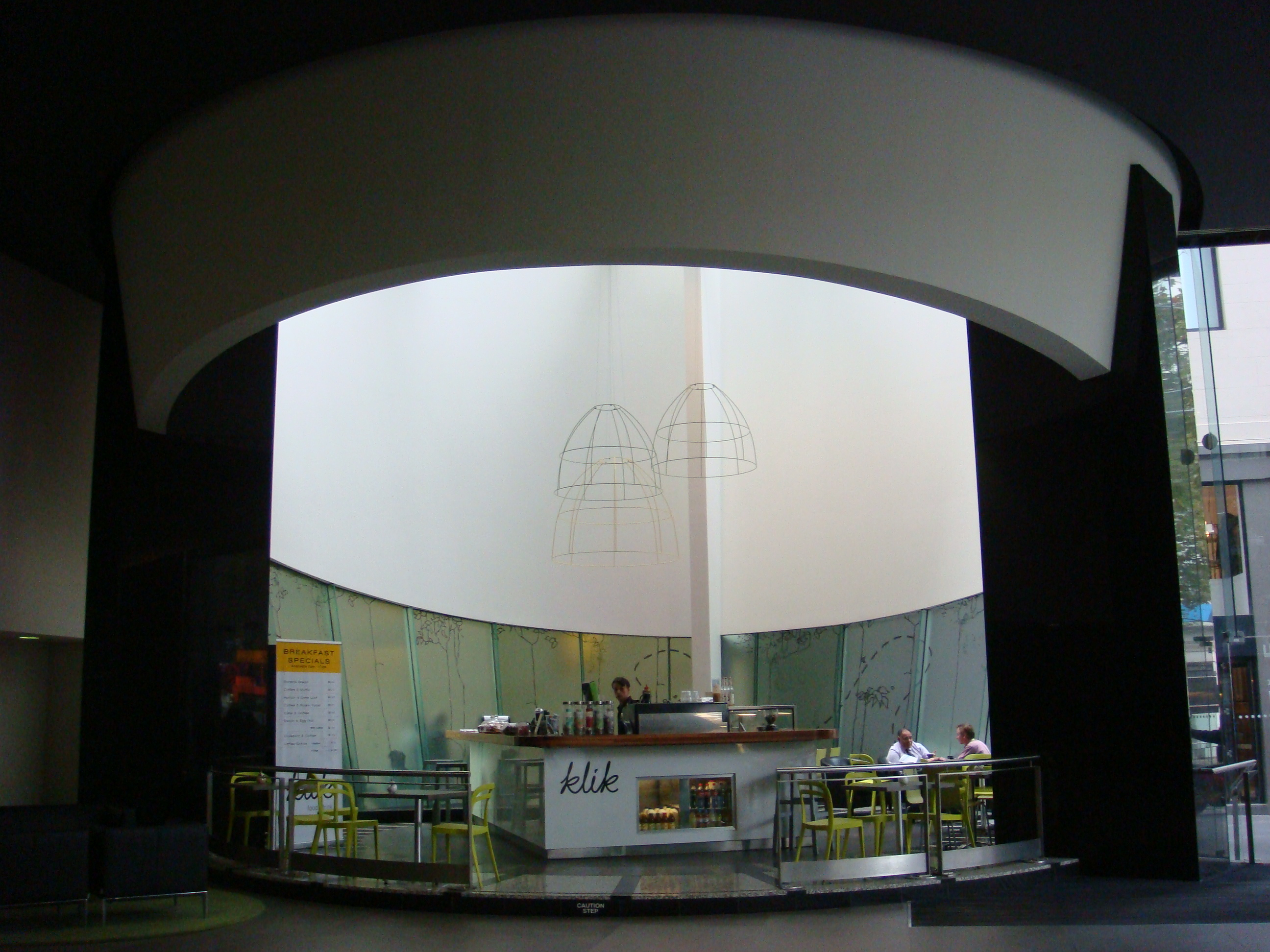
Interior photo of Argus Centre- Kliks Cafe

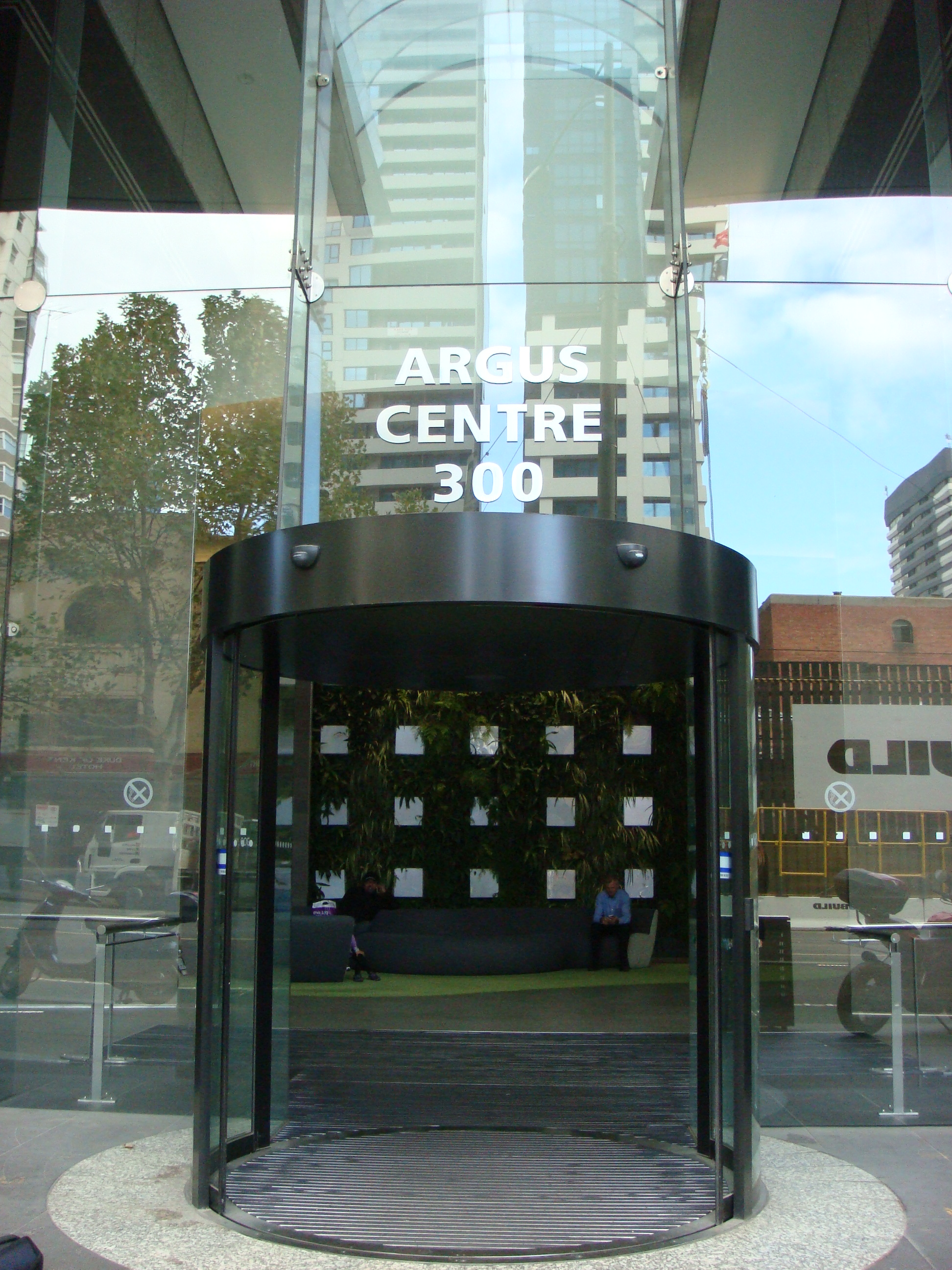
Front entry to Argus Centre

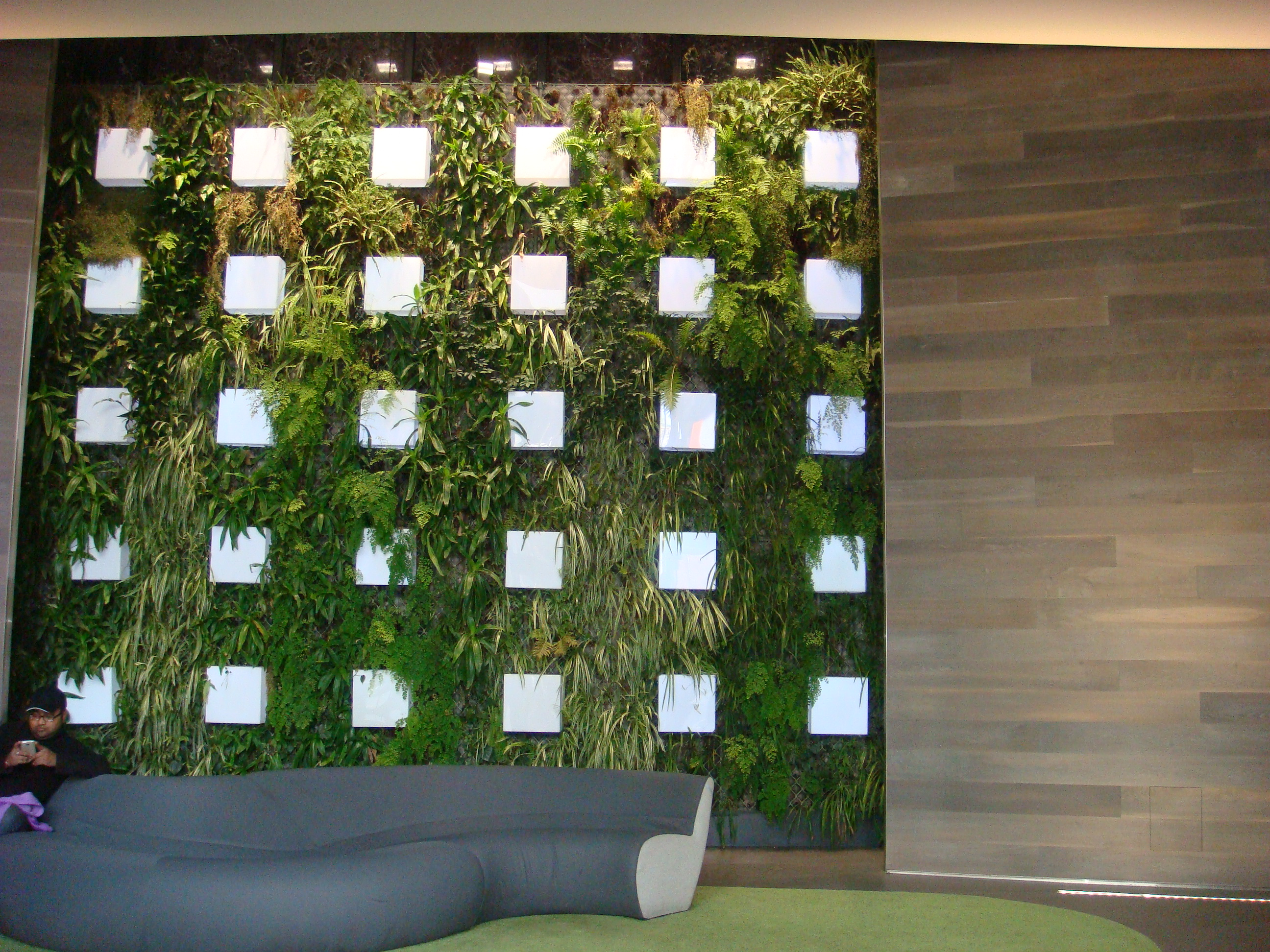
Interior view of The Argus Centre

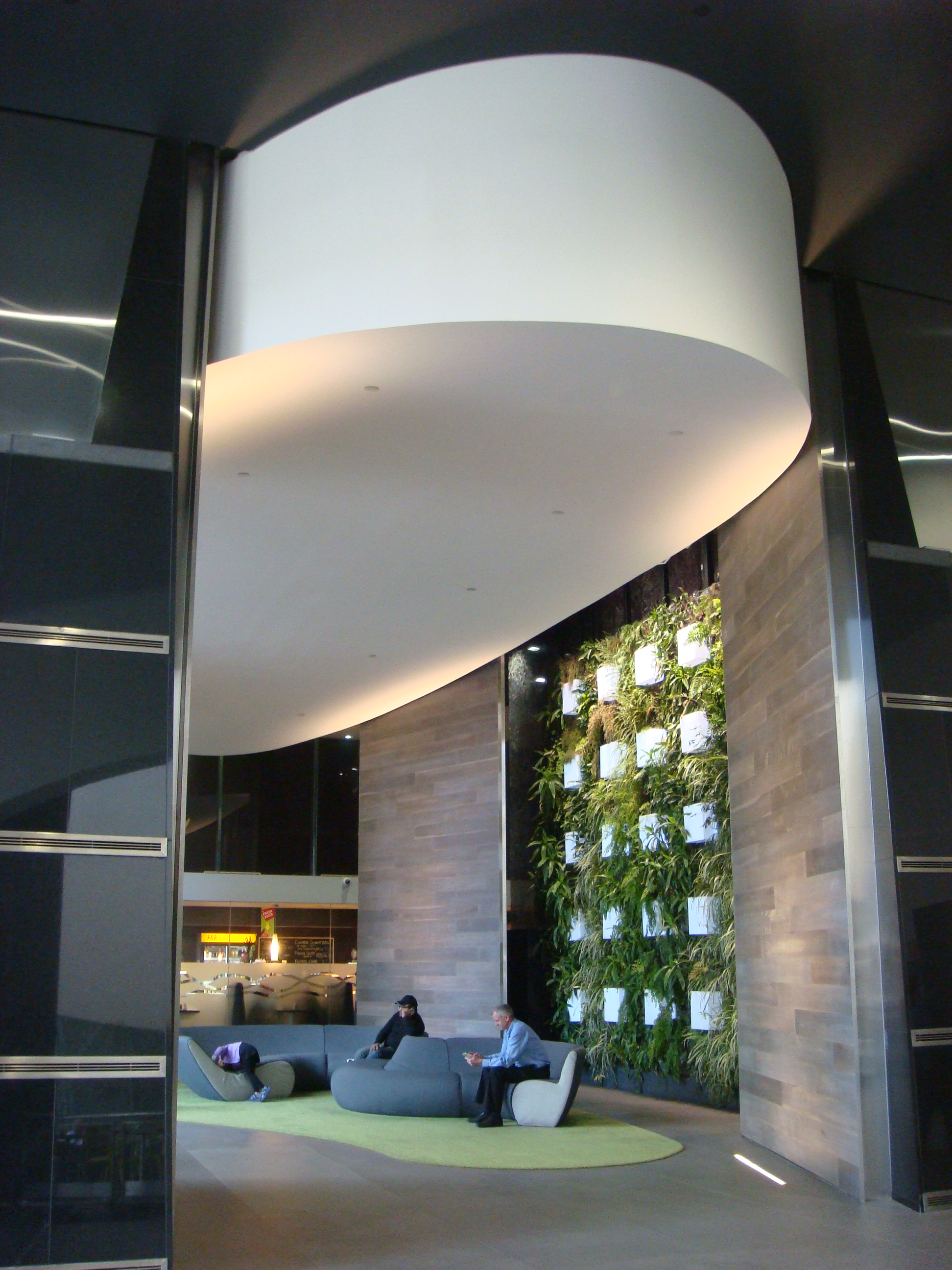
Interior view of Argus Centre

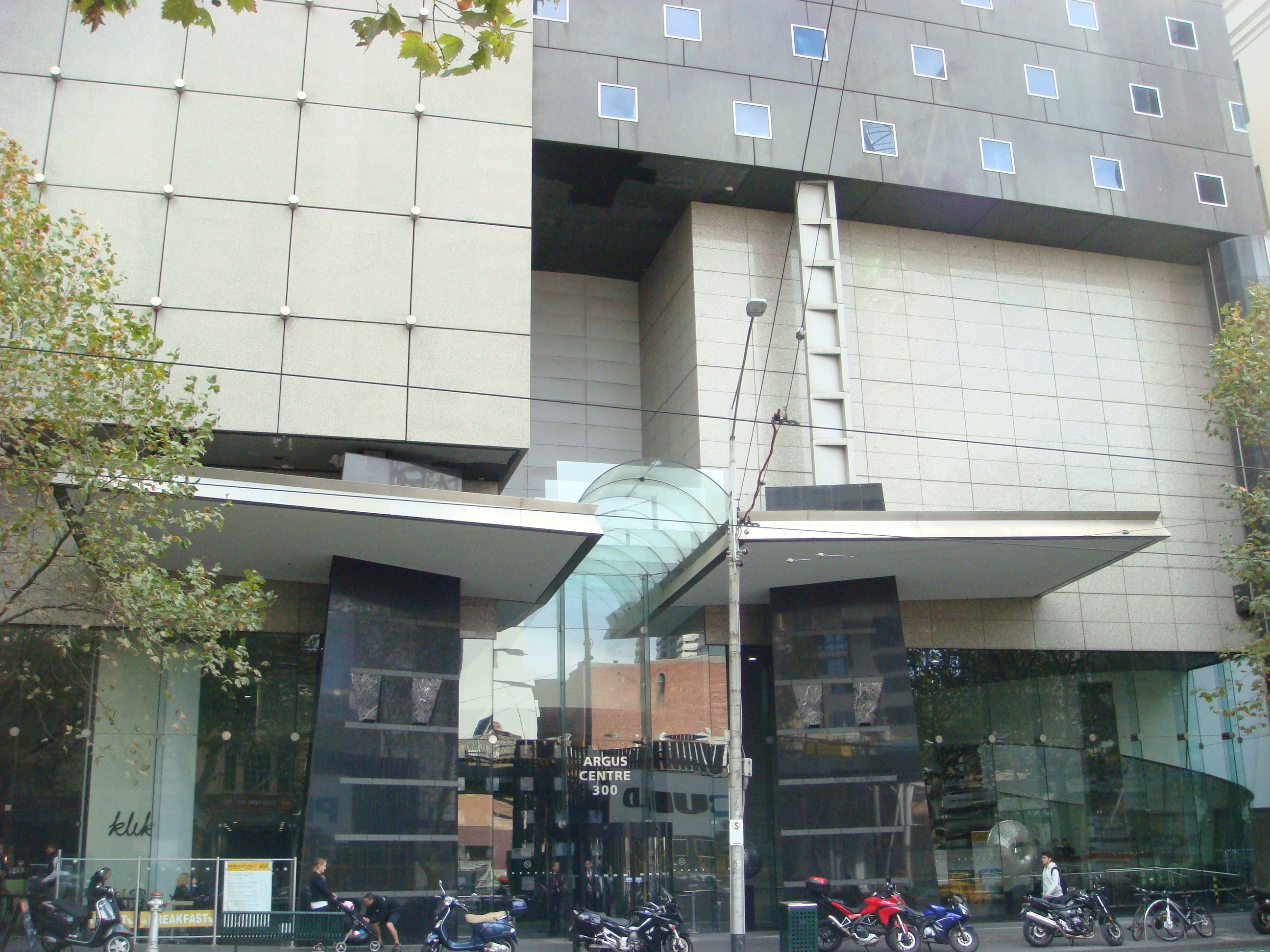
Street level view of front of The Argus Centre

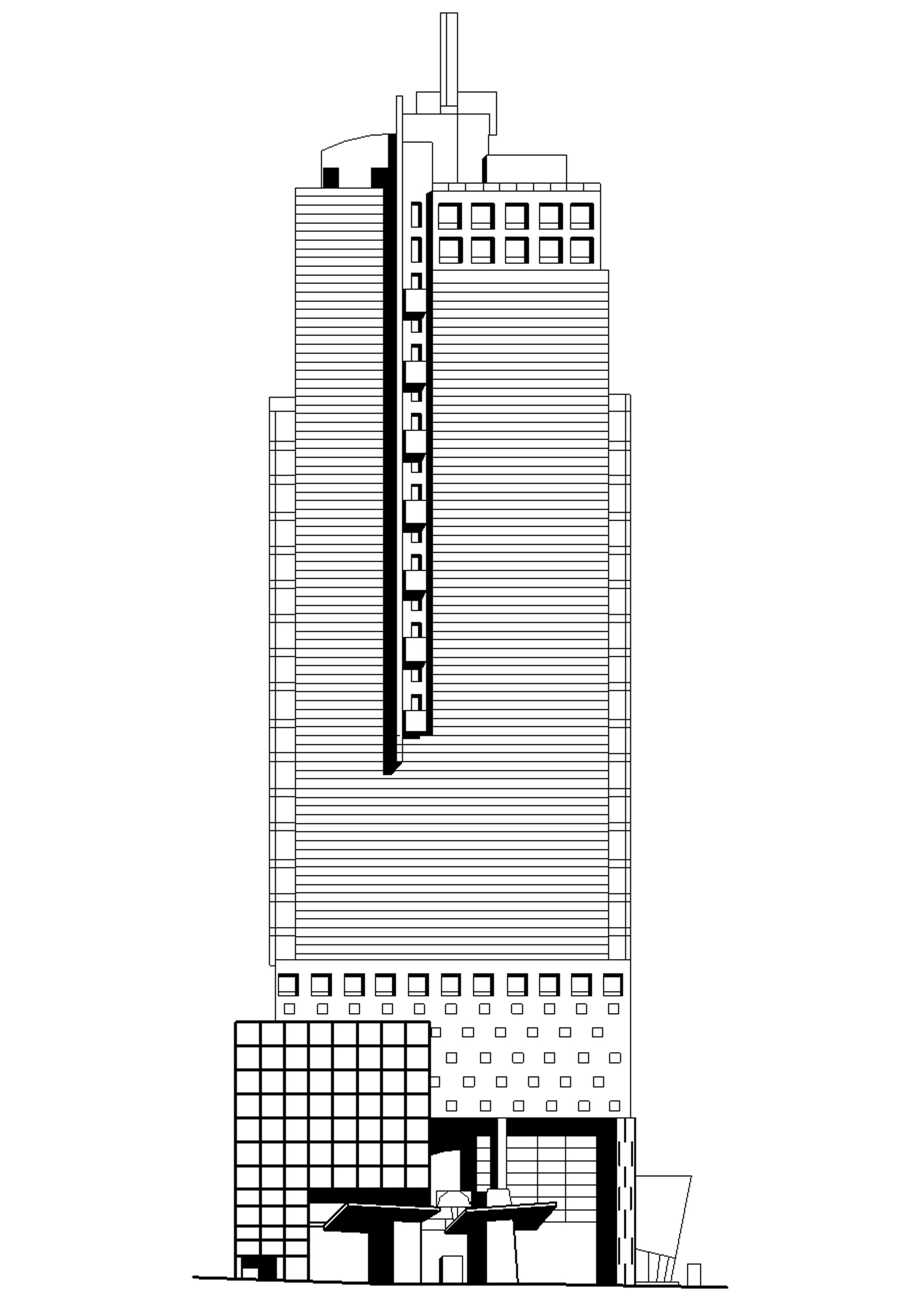
South Elevation

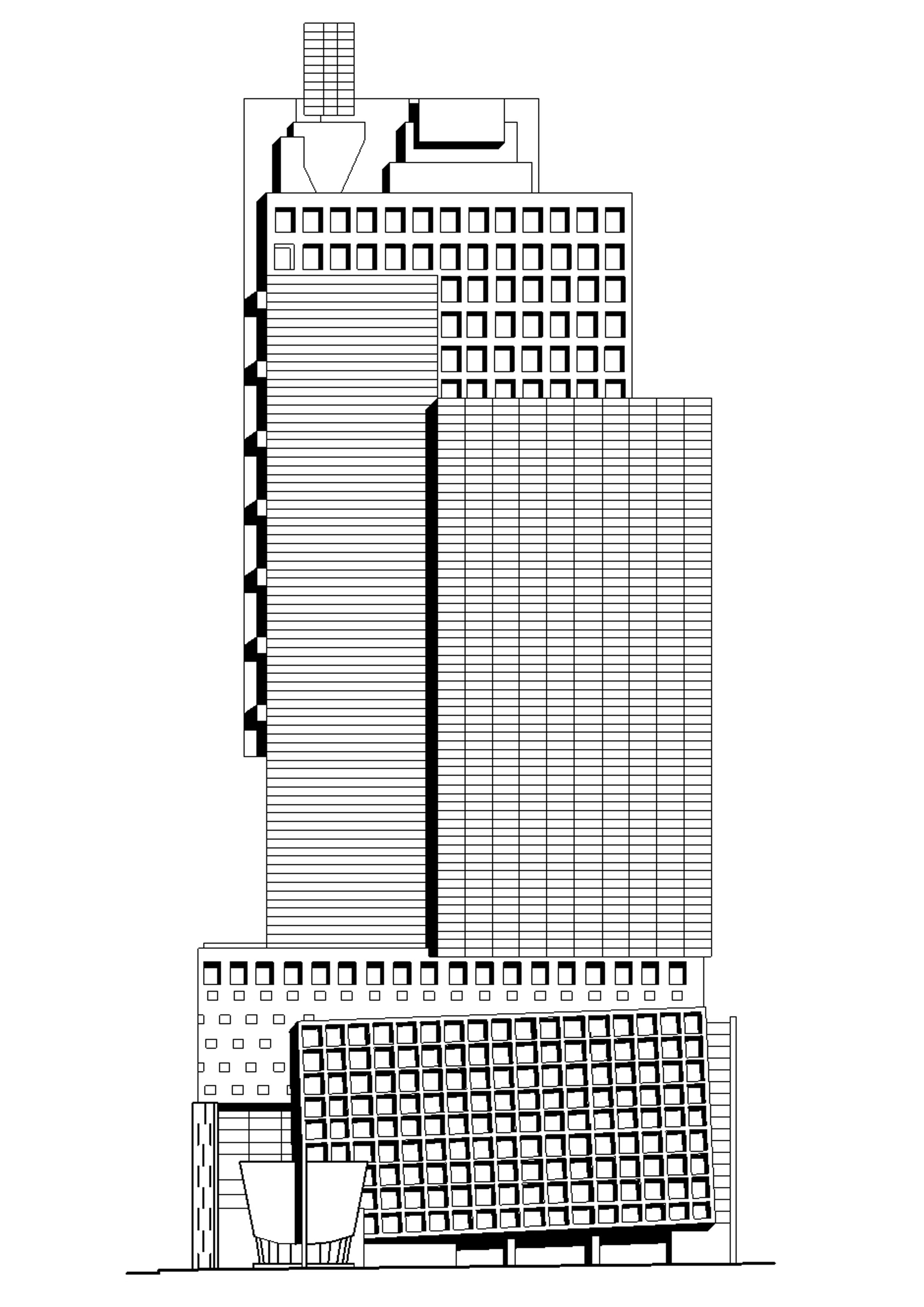
East Elevation

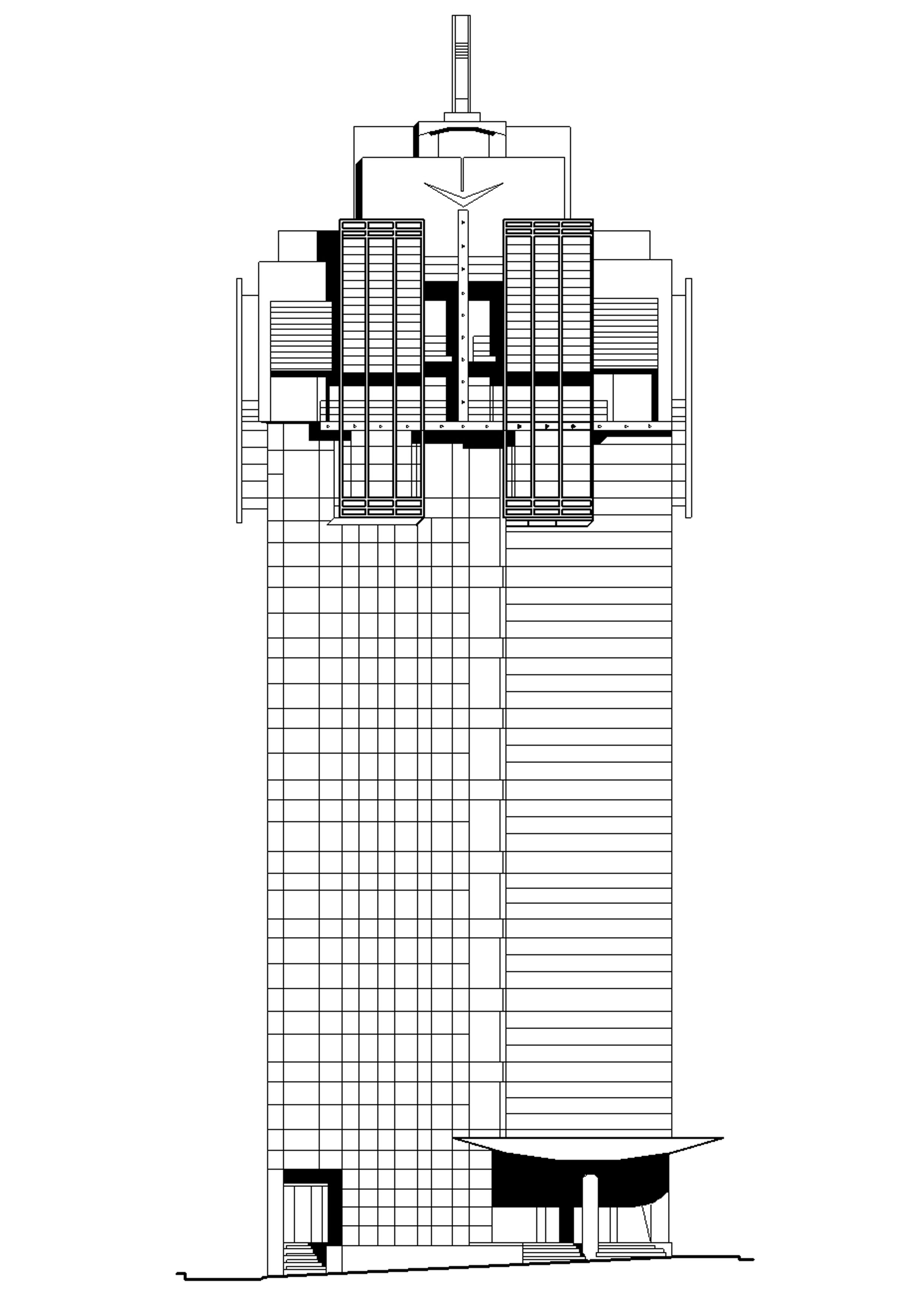
North Elevation

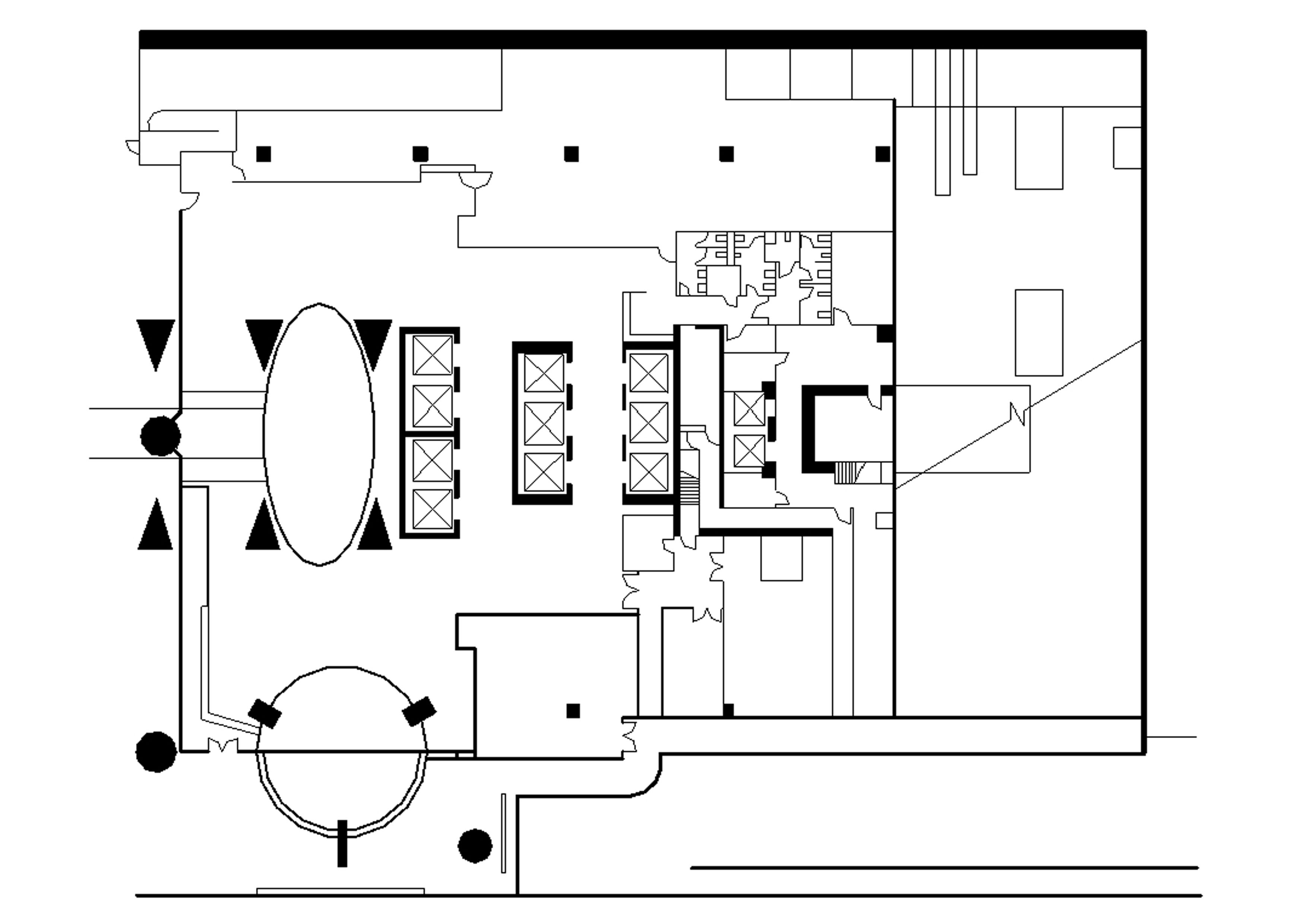
Ground Floor Plan
