= Melbourne Terrace Apartments =

Apartment building

Coordinates: 37°48′32″S 144°57′30″E

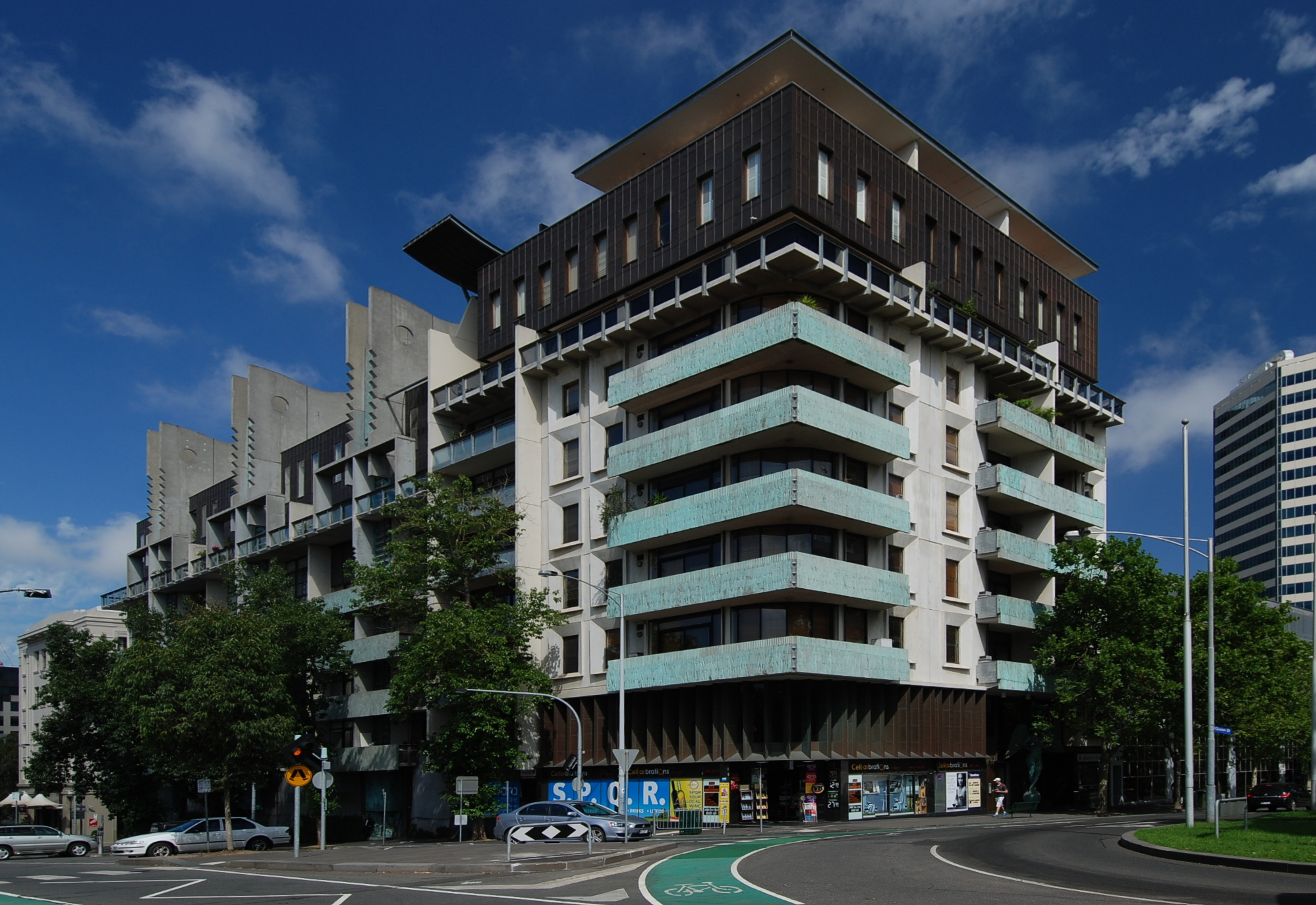
Melbourne Terrace Apartments.

Melbourne Terrace is a set of 60 apartments at the corner of Franklin and Queen Street, Melbourne.

The apartment complex, designed by architect Nonda Katsalidis, comprises four self-contained buildings, Equus, Mondo, Roma and Fortuna. This division creates a low population for each, ensuring moderate demands upon the building services and a high degree of privacy. At the entrance of each building is a signature sculpture by Peter Corlett.

The building is listed as one of the Top 20 buildings in Australia of the 20th century by Architecture Australia in the December 1999 edition. The building is also featured in Australian Architecture Now.
