= List of heritage-listed buildings in Melbourne =

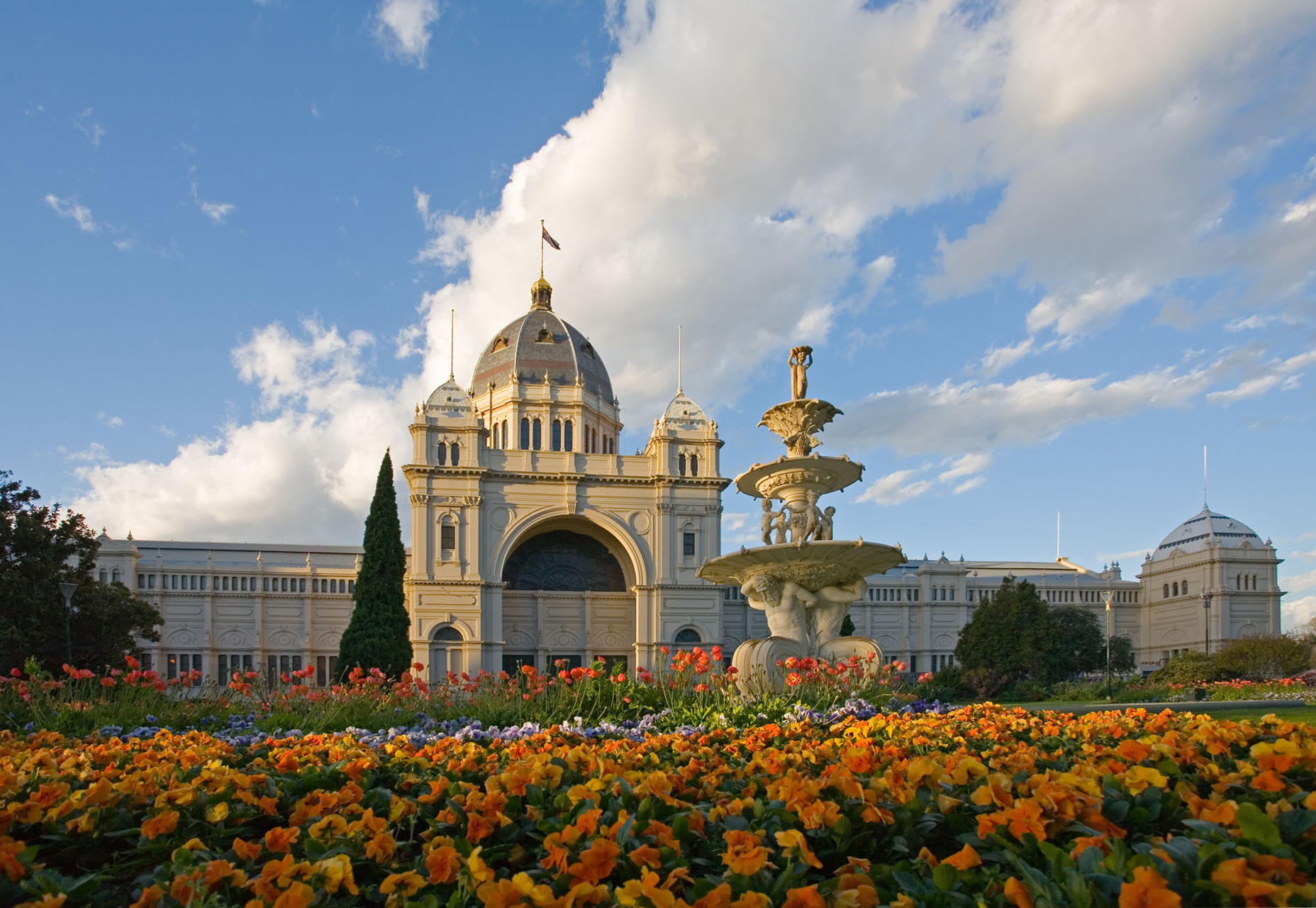
Royal Exhibition Building

This is a non-exhaustive list of buildings in Melbourne, Victoria, Australia and surrounding suburbs added to the Victorian Heritage Register. The Victorian Heritage Register the highest level of protection afforded to a building by the Government of Victoria. A far greater number of buildings and precincts are covered by Heritage Overlays in local government planning schemes, though these may not have the same level of protection.

The list is categorised by the purpose or use of the building.

The list contains buildings only. Other sites that have been added to the Victorian Heritage Register that do not contain buildings are not included on this list.

== Public buildings ==
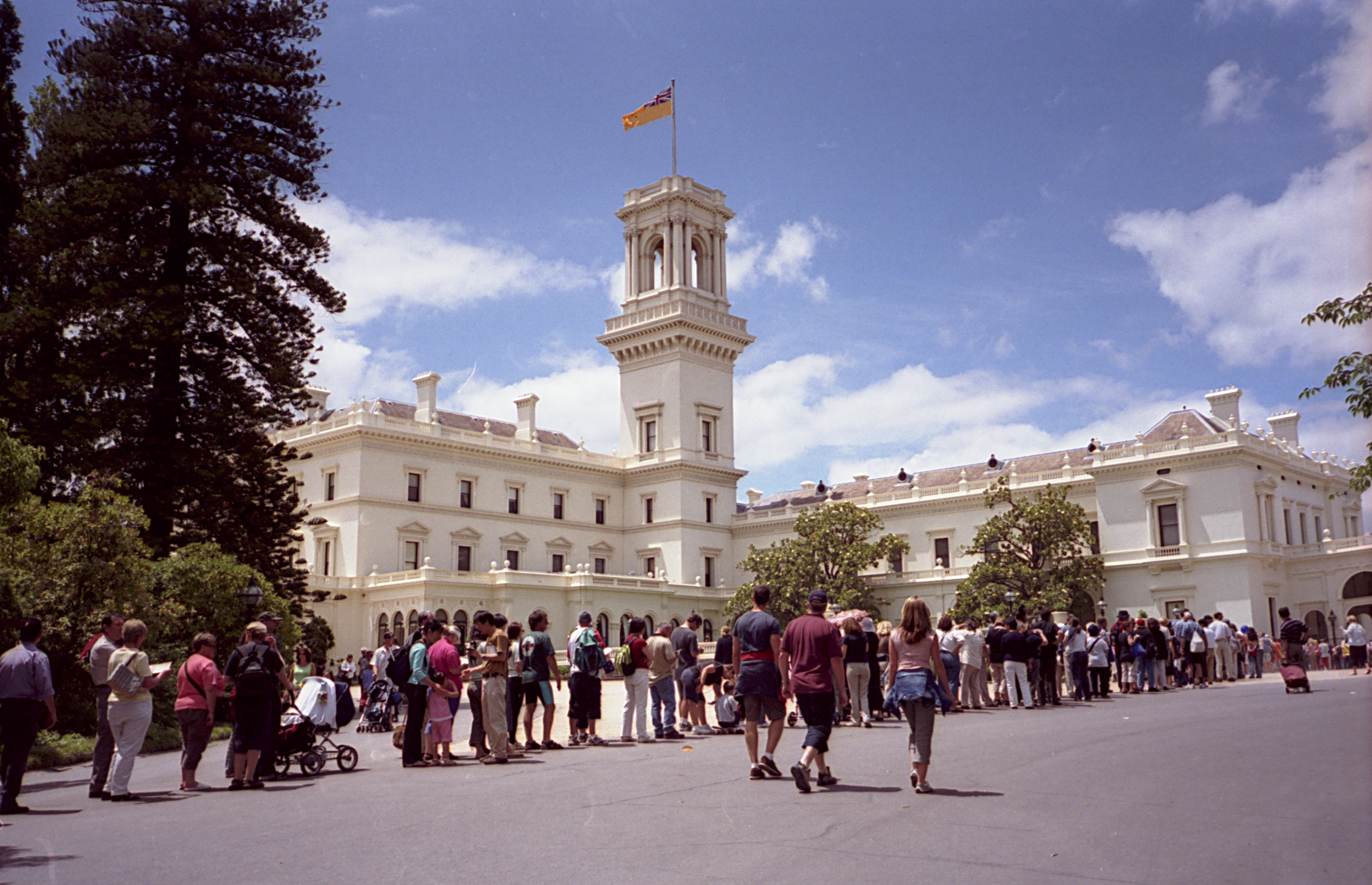
Government House

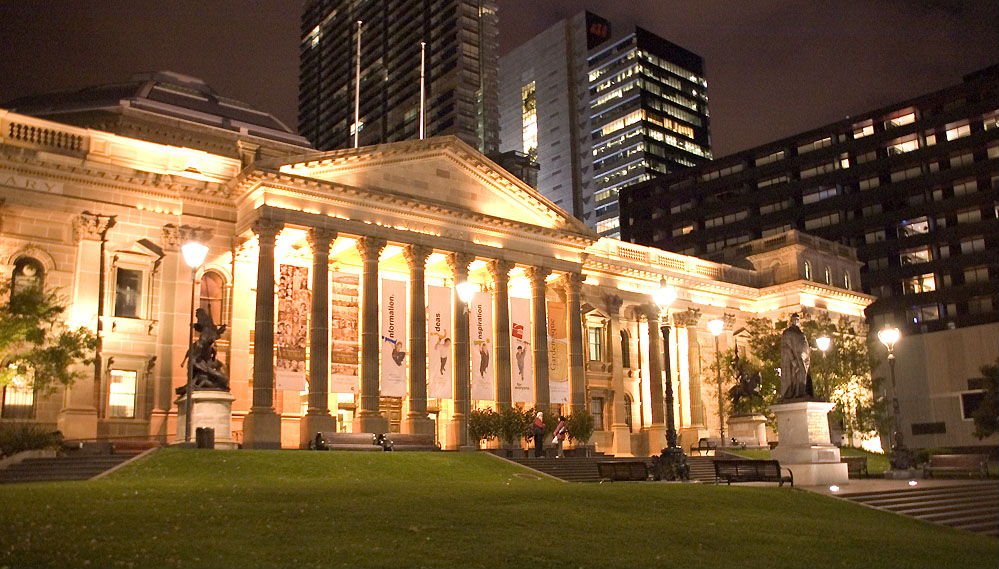
State Library of Victoria

- City Baths
- Eastern Hill Fire Station
- General Post Office
- Government House
- HM Prison Pentridge, Coburg
- National Gallery of Victoria
- Old Melbourne Gaol
- Old Melbourne Magistrates' Court
- Old Treasury Building
- Parliament House
- Queen Victoria Women's Centre (formerly Queen Victoria Memorial Hospital)
- Russell Street Police Headquarters (former)
- Royal Exhibition Building
- Shrine of Remembrance
- State Library of Victoria
- Supreme Court of Victoria
- Titles Office (former)

=== Town Halls ===
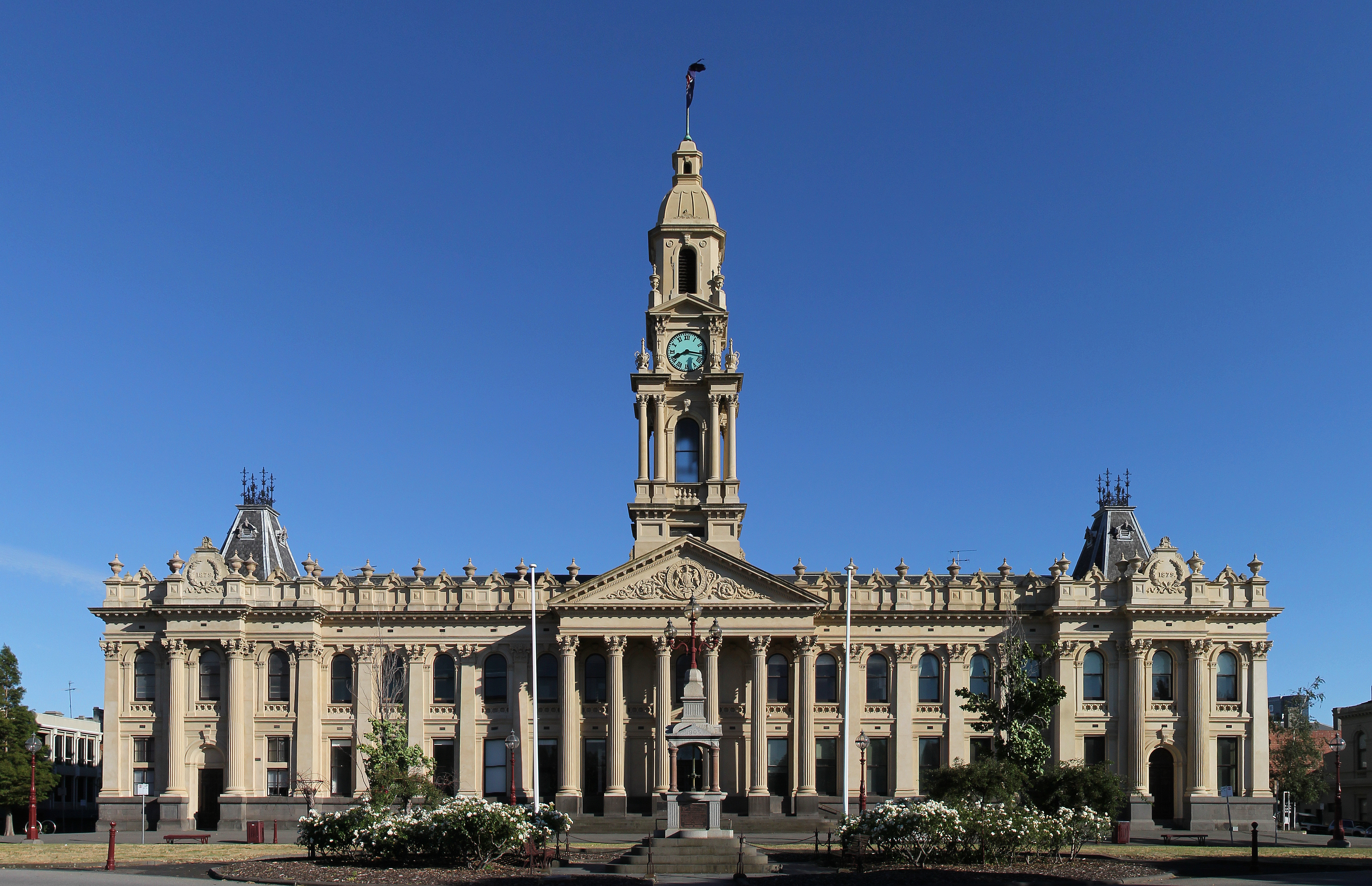
South Melbourne Town Hall

- Box Hill Town Hall
- Collingwood Town Hall
- Fitzroy Town Hall
- Footscray Town Hall
- Melbourne Town Hall
- Prahran Town Hall
- South Melbourne Town Hall

=== Railway stations ===
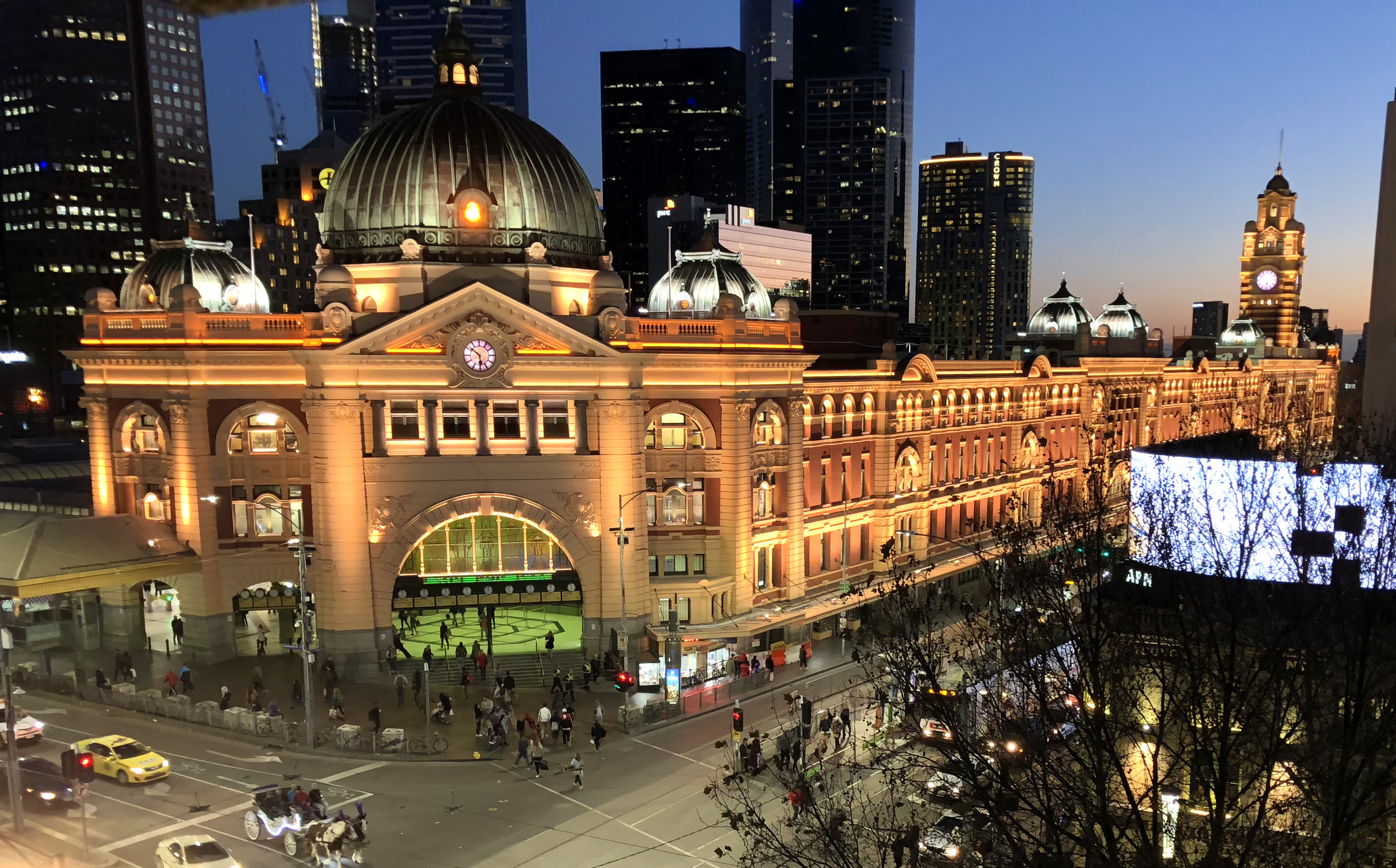
Flinders Street station

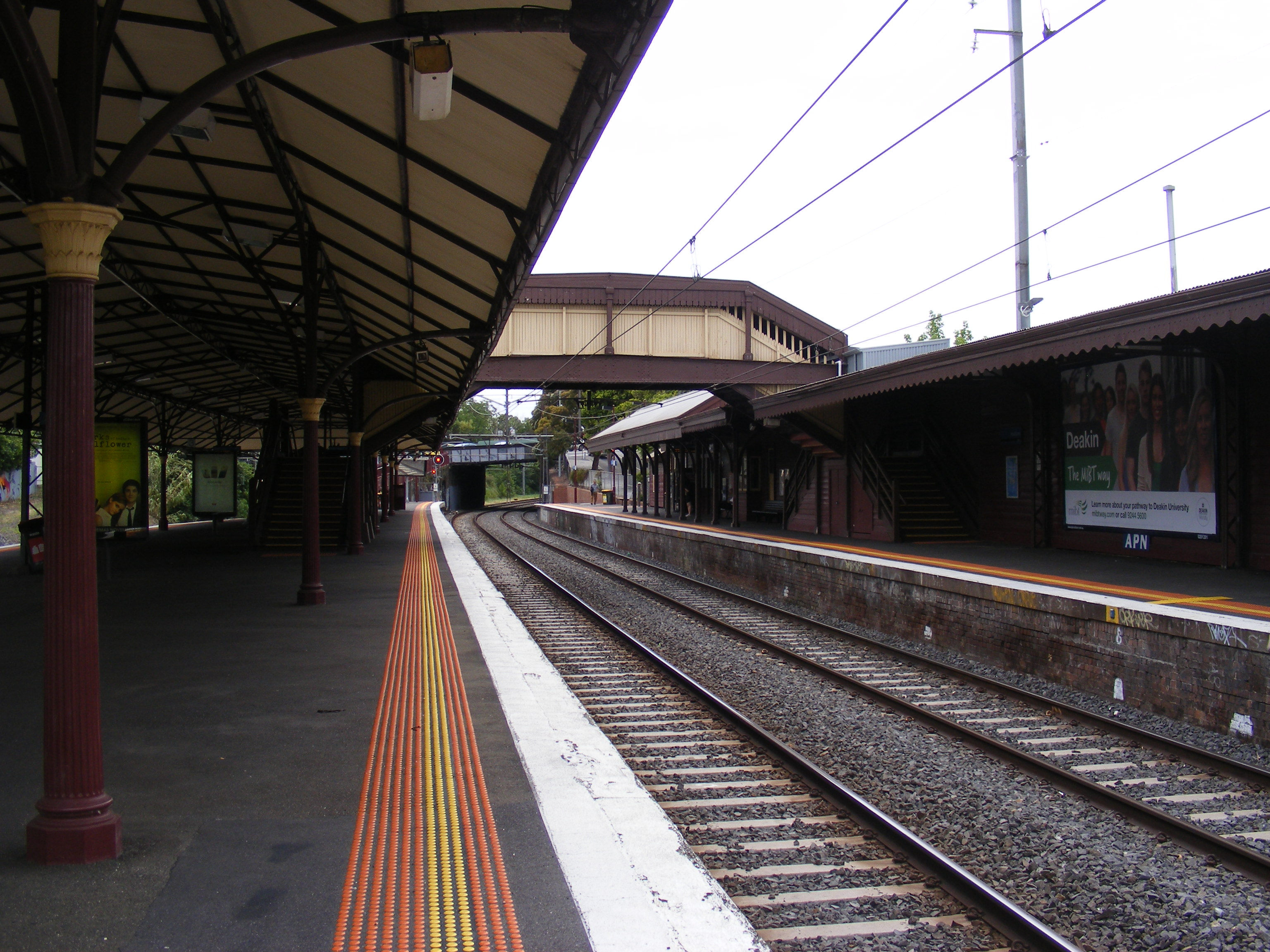
Hawthorn station

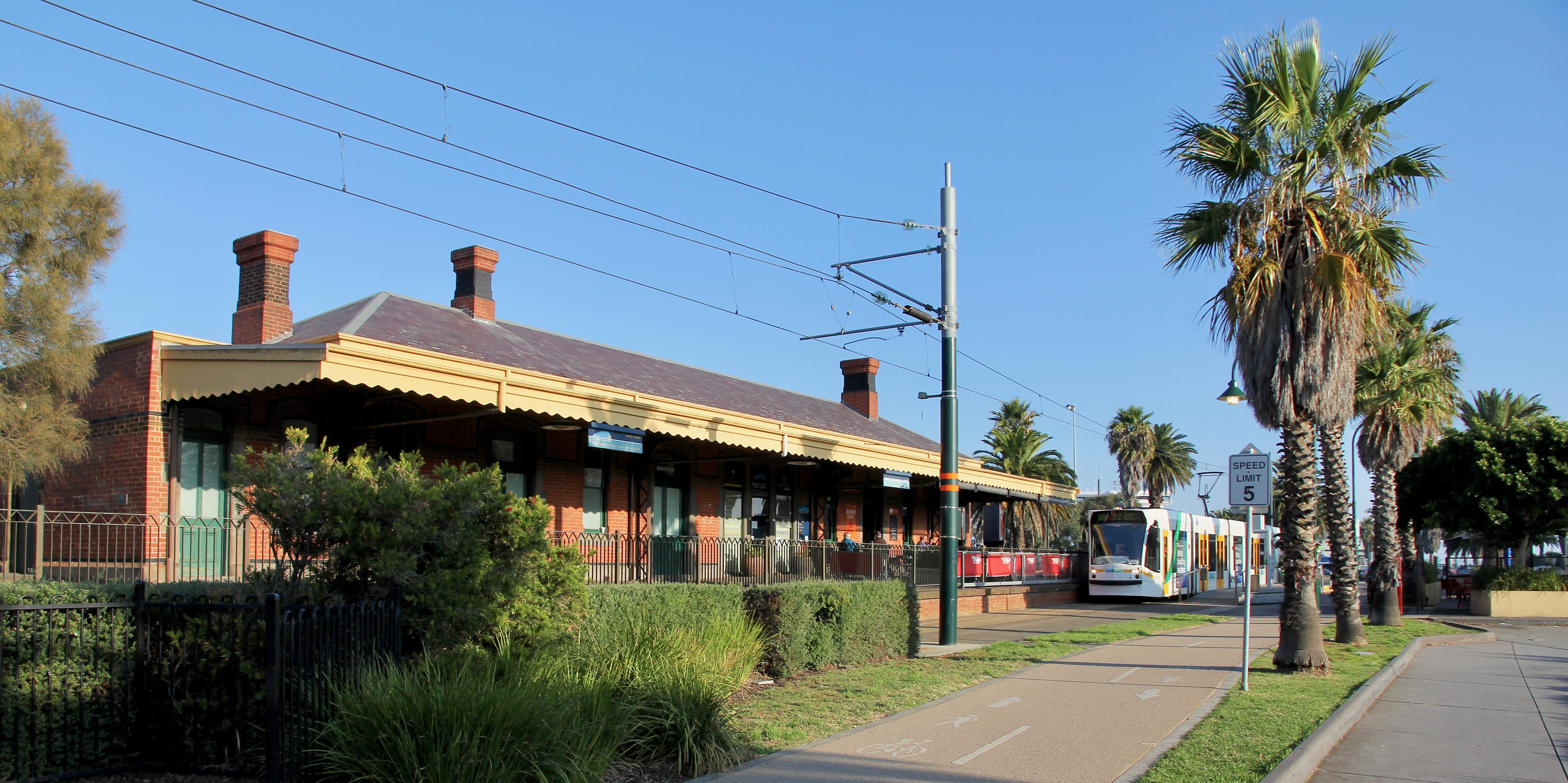
The former Port Melbourne station, now a shop adjacent to a light rail stop

In cases where the heritage listing does not cover the entire station complex, the elements subject to the heritage listing are given.

- Auburn (1916)
- Brighton Beach (building on platform 1/2, signal box and footbridge – 1889)
- Caulfield (1913–1920)
- Clayton (old timber shelter – 1891)
- Clifton Hill (1887–1901)
- Essendon (1909–1922)
- Flinders Street
- Footscray
- Glenferrie (1916)
- Hawthorn
- Lilydale
- Malvern
- Mentone (old station buildings and gardens – 1914)
- Middle Brighton
- North Melbourne
- Ringwood
- Ripponlea (1913)
- Werribee (building on platform 3 – 1857)
- Williamstown (1858)
- Windsor (1885–1886)

==== Former railway stations ====
Now tram stops:

- Albert Park
- Port Melbourne
- South Melbourne
- St Kilda

== Institutional buildings ==
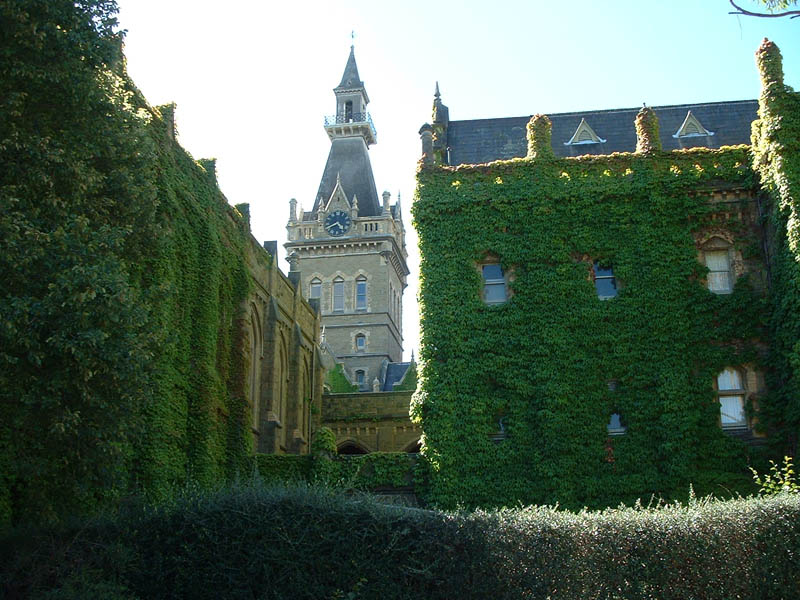
Ivy covered exterior of Ormond College

- Baldwin Spencer Building, Melbourne University
- Emily McPherson College of Domestic Economy
- The Mac.Robertson Girls' High School
- Melbourne Grammar School
- Melbourne High School
- Melbourne Trades Hall, Carlton
- Old Pathology Building, Melbourne University
- Old Physics Conference Room and Gallery, Melbourne University
- Ormond College
- Kew Lunatic Asylum

== Commercial buildings ==
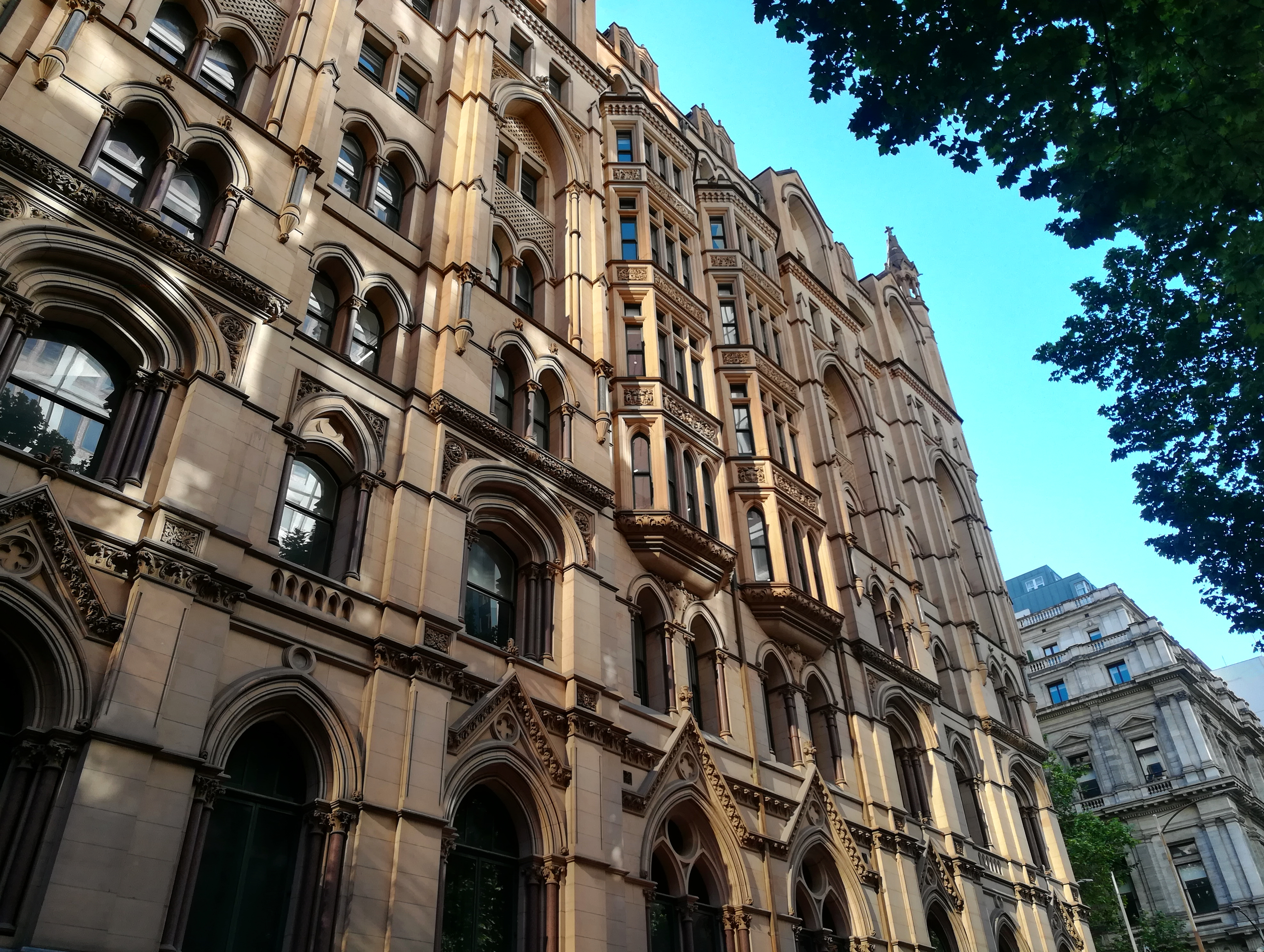
A. C. Goode House, Queen Street

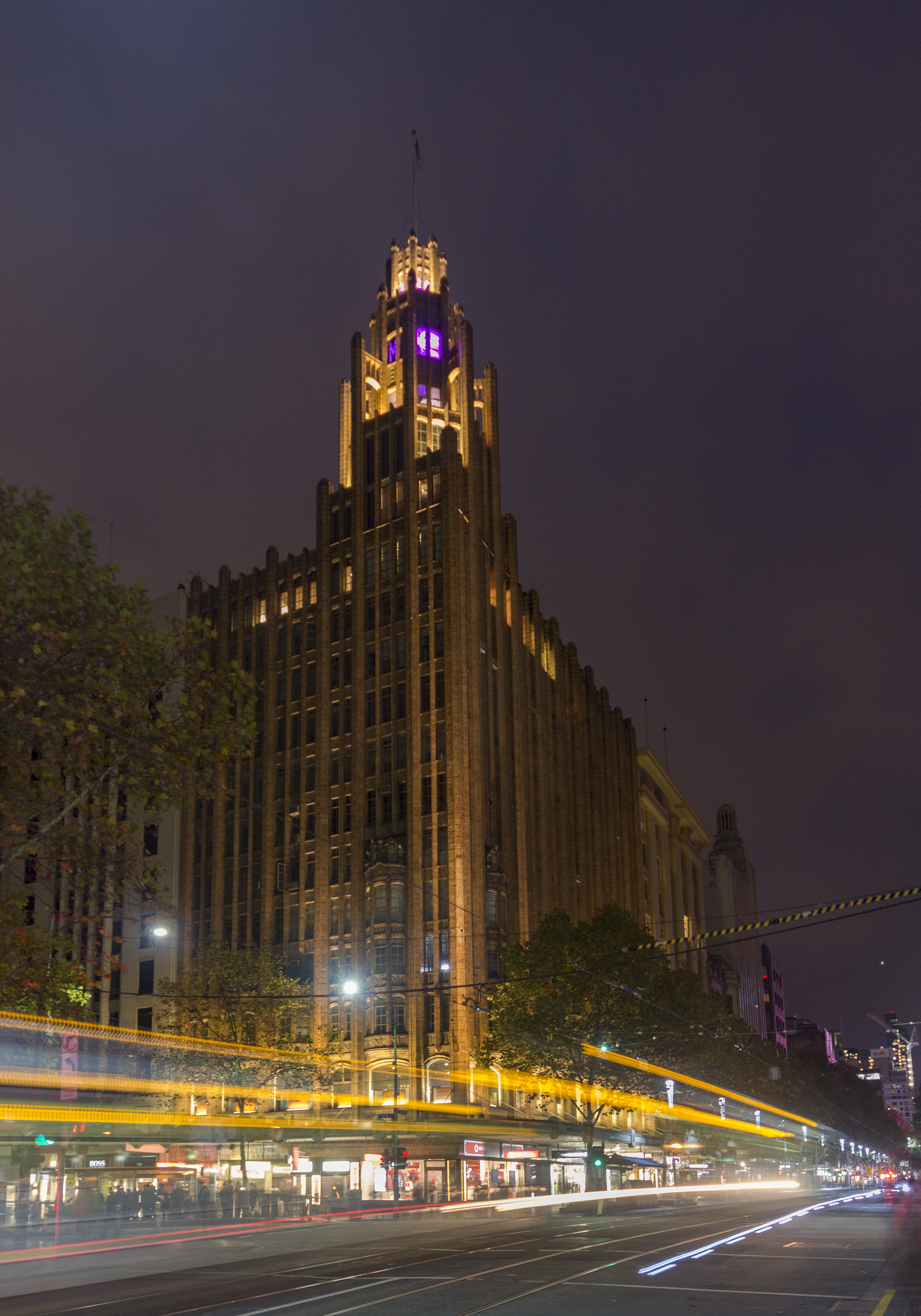
Manchester Unity Building, Collins Street

- 67 Spencer Street, former Victorian Railway Headquarters, now Grand Hotel Melbourne
- 140 William Street (formerly BHP House)
- A. C. Goode House, Queen Street
- Alkira House, Queen Street
- Austral Building, Collins Street
- Former Bank of Australasia – Treasury on Collins Apartment Hotel, Collins Street / Queen Street
- Block Arcade
- Bryant and May Factory, Richmond
- Coop's Shot Tower
- Dovers Building, Drewery Lane
- Duke of Wellington Hotel
- ES&A (Gothic) Bank
- Gordon House
- Windsor Hotel, Spring Street
- Lombard Building, Queen Street
- Orica House, Nicholson Street
- Manchester Unity Building, Collins Street / Swanston Street
- Metropolitan Meat Market, North Melbourne
- National Mutual Life Association Building
- Nicholas Building, Swanston Street / Flinders Lane
- Olderfleet Building
- Queen Victoria Market
- Rialto Towers
- Royal Arcade
- Safe Deposit Building
- Young & Jackson, Flinders Street / Swanston Street
- Yule House, Little Collins Street

== Theatres and cinemas ==
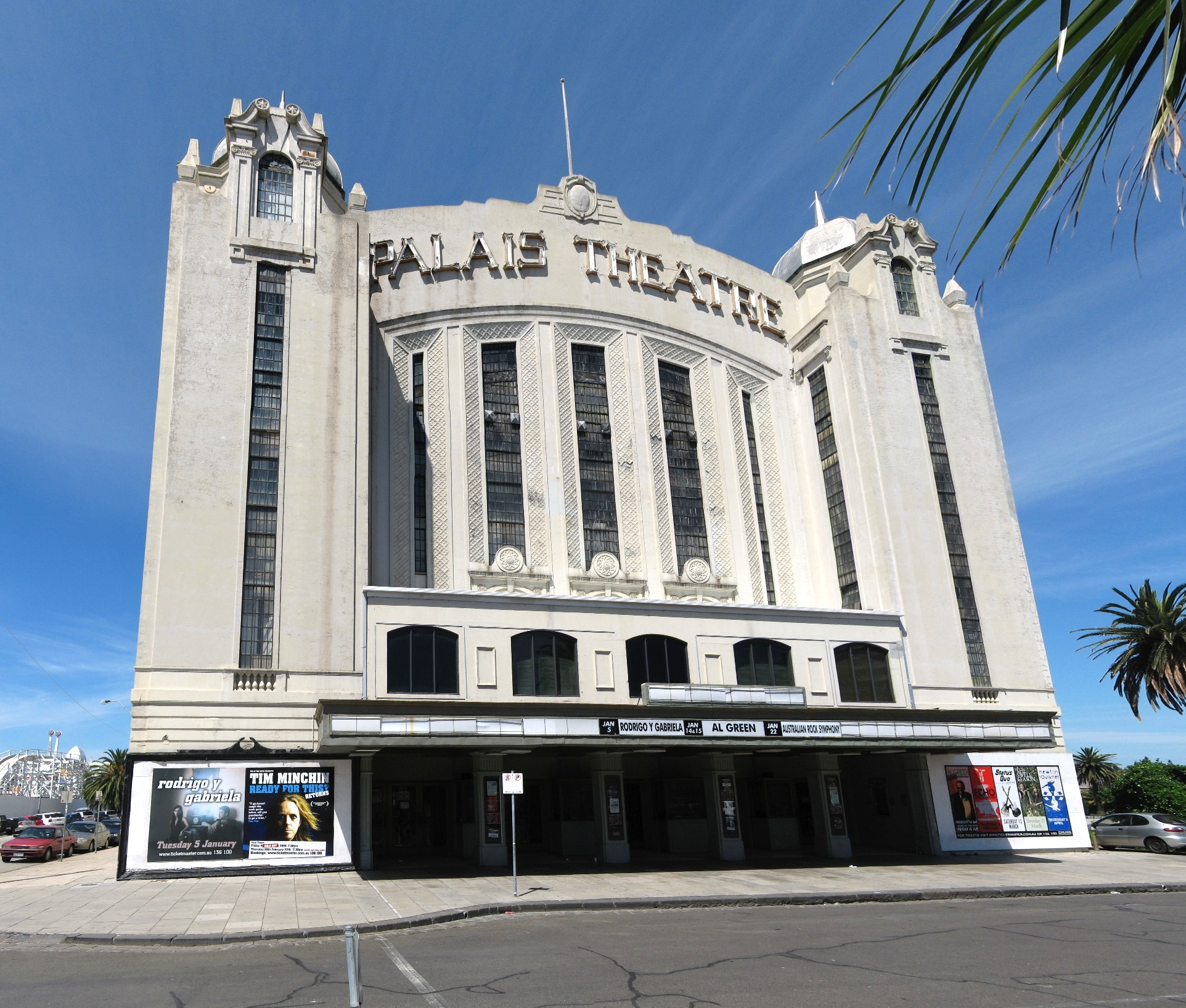
Palais Theatre

- Arts Centre Melbourne (1984)
- Astor Theatre, St Kilda
- Athenaeum Theatre
- Capitol Theatre
- Forum Theatre
- Her Majesty's Theatre
- Palais Theatre, St Kilda
- Princess Theatre
- Regent Theatre
- Rivoli Cinemas, Camberwell (Rivoli Theatre)

== Religious buildings ==
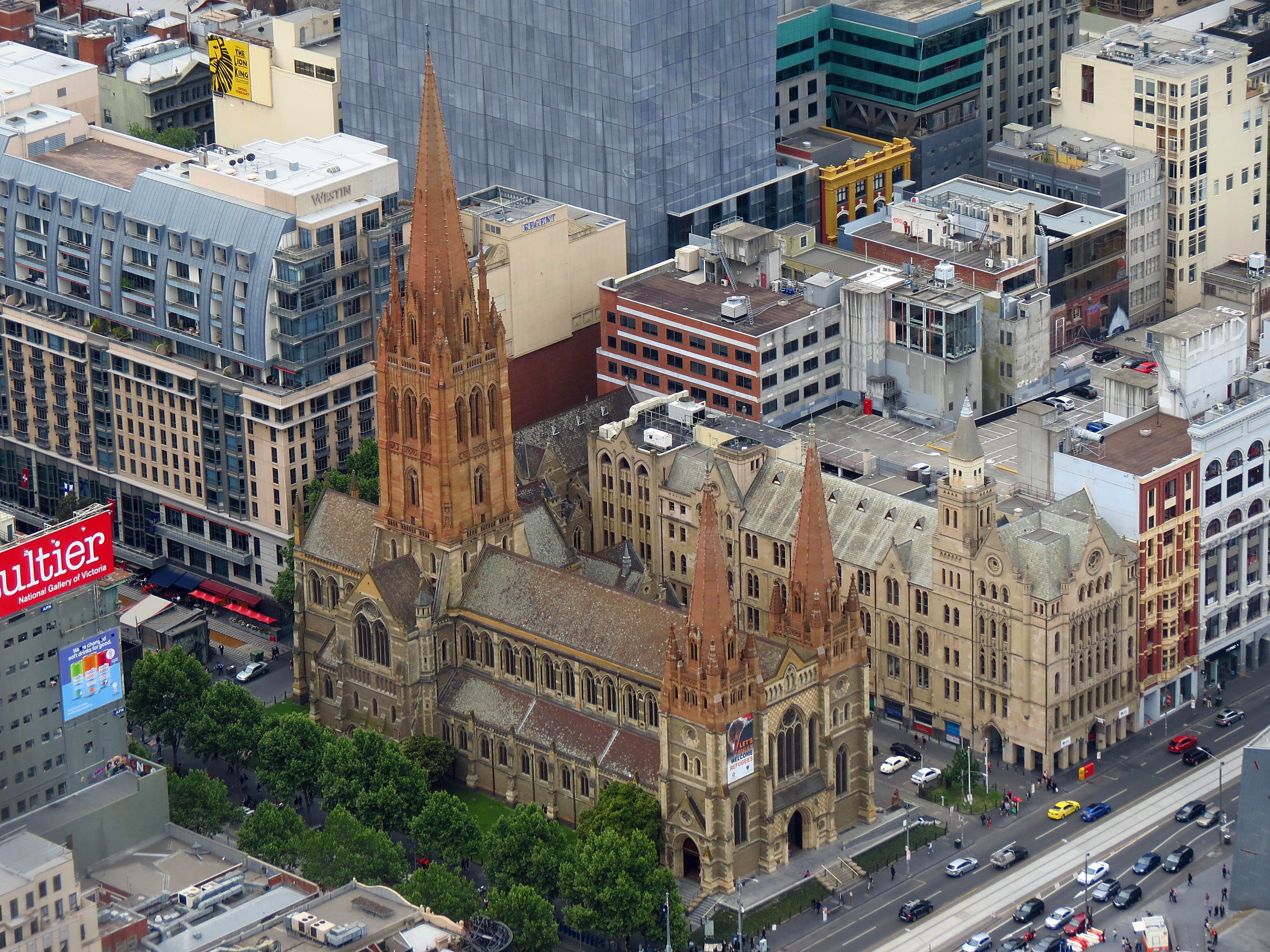
St Pauls Cathedral

- Collins Street Baptist Church
- East Melbourne Synagogue
- Lutheran Trinity Church, East Melbourne
- Scot's Church
- St Francis' Church
- St Patricks Cathedral
- St Pauls Cathedral
- The Mission to Seafarers
- Wesley Church
- Albanian Mosque, Carlton North
- The Church of All Nations

== Residential ==
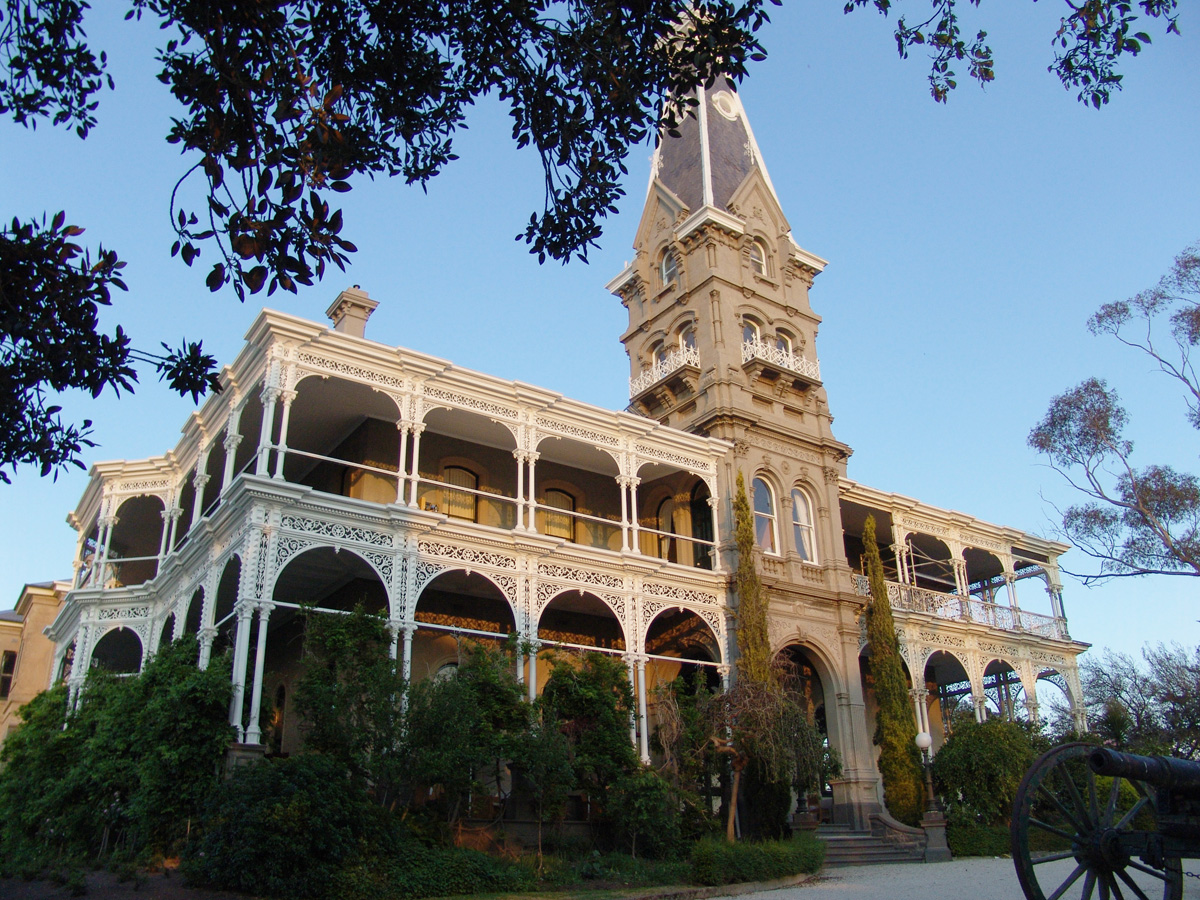
Rupertswood

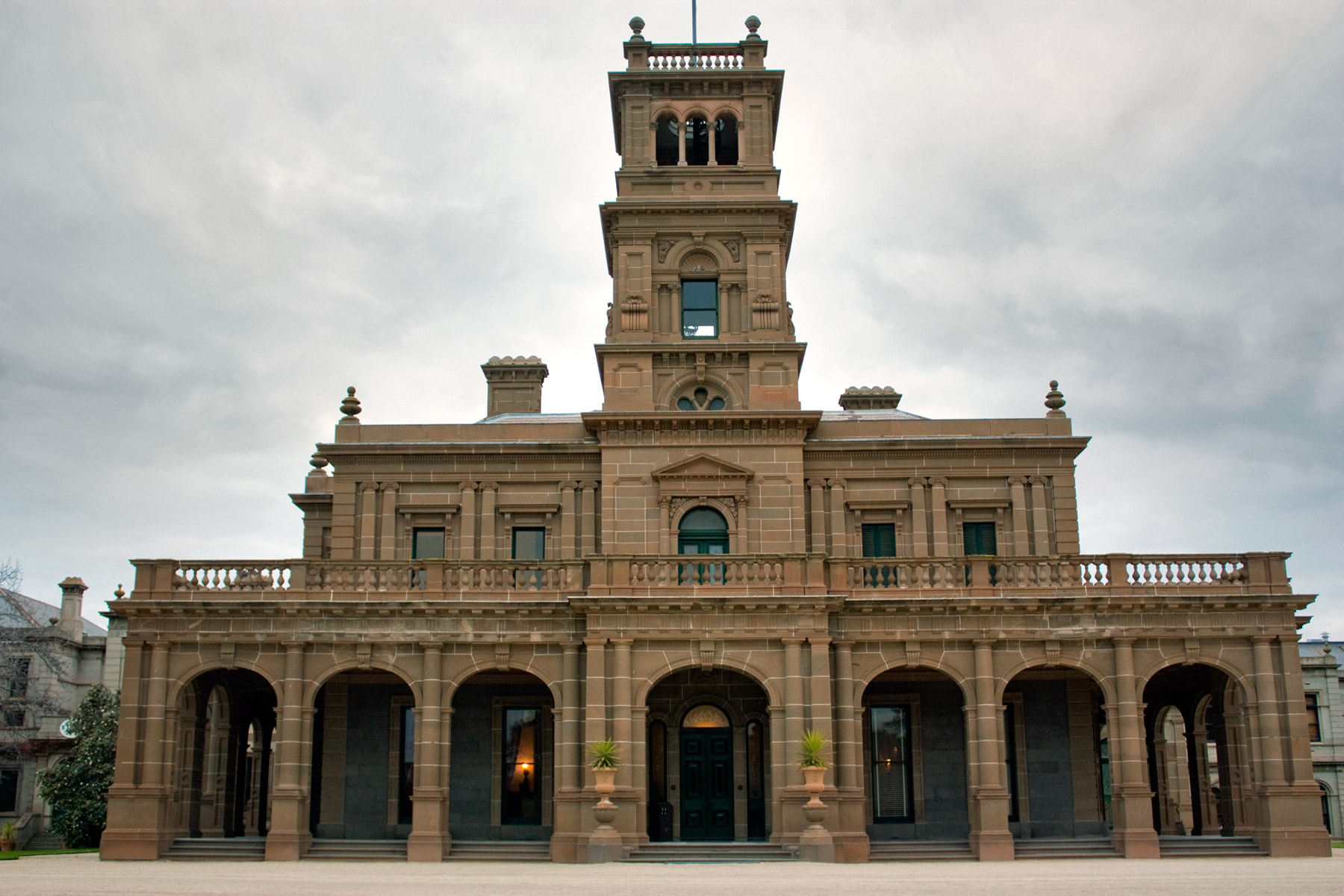
Werribee Park

- Bishopscourt, East Melbourne (1853)
- Cairo Flats, Fitzroy (1936)
- Como House, South Yarra
- D'Estaville, Kew (1859)
- Frognall, Canterbury
- Horatio Jones house, Tecoma
- Labassa, Caulfield North
- Lalor House, Richmond
- Newburn Flats, (1941)
- Raheen, Kew
- Rippon Lea Estate, Elsternwick (1868)
- Rupertswood, Sunbury (1876)
- Stonnington Mansion, Malvern (1890)
- Valentine's Mansion; now Caulfield Grammar School – Malvern Campus
- Werribee Park Mansion, Werribee (1877)
- McCrae Homestead, McCrae (1844)
- Sunnyside Farm, Templestowe (1890)
- Toorak House, Toorak (1850–51)

== Sporting grounds and grandstands ==
- Melbourne Cricket Ground, Jolimont
- Michael Tuck Stand (Glenferrie Oval), Hawthorn
- Main Grandstand (Brunswick Street Oval), North Fitzroy
- Olympic Swimming Stadium

== Other structures ==
- Clifton Hill Shot Tower
- Coop's Shot Tower
- Federation Square
- Luna Park
- Newport Workshops
- No 2 Goods Shed
- Nylex Clock
- Polly Woodside
- Richmond Power Station
- Royal Parade
- Sidney Myer Music Bowl
- Spotswood Pumping Station
- Station Pier
- St Kilda Pavilion
- Time Ball Tower
- Victoria Dock
- Wailing Wall (Melbourne)

=== Bridges ===
- Kane's Bridge
- Morell Bridge
- Princes Bridge
- Queens Bridge
- Sandridge Bridge

== See also ==
- Architecture of Melbourne
- Lists of places on the Victorian Heritage Register by local government area
- Melbourne's Lost Victorian Landmarks
