= Kane's Bridge =

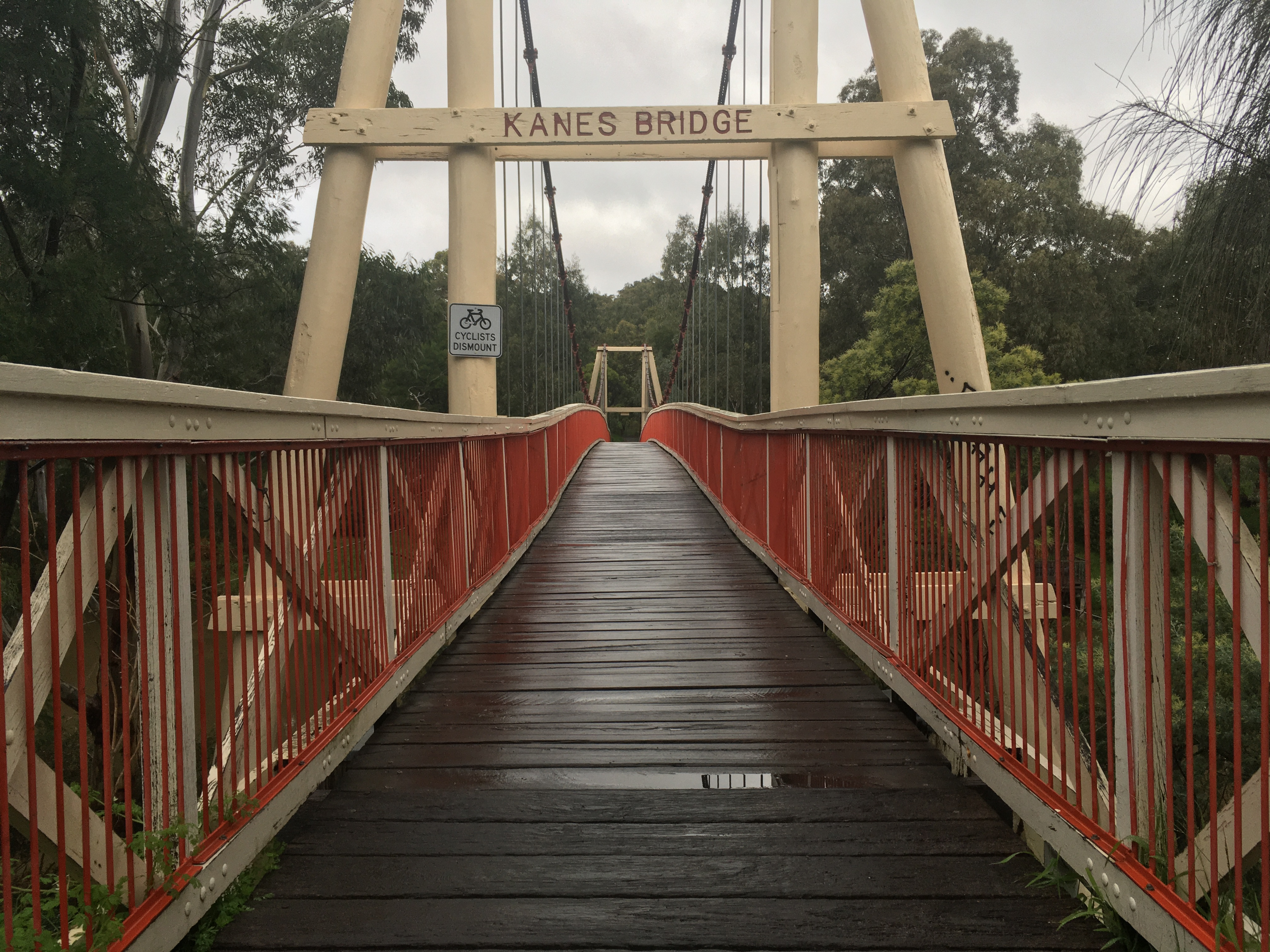
- Coordinates: 37.80001°S 145.00964°E
- Crossed: Yarra River
- Locale: Melbourne, Australia
- Began: Fairfield
- Ended: Kew
- Named for: T J Kane
- Heritage status: Victorian Heritage Register

History
- Construction end: 1928 (original bridge)
- Rebuilt: 1935
- Collapsed: 1 December 1934

Kane's Bridge, also written as Kanes Bridge and previously known as Kane's Suspension Bridge, is a wooden suspension bridge located in Yarra Bend Park, Melbourne, Australia over the Yarra River, linking the inner-city suburbs of Fairfield and Kew. The bridge is for use exclusively by pedestrians, with cyclists required to dismount before entering the bridge.

The bridge was originally built in 1928 with the intention of connecting Kew with the public golf course located on the opposite side of the Yarra River, in Fairfield, replacing a ferry service. It was named after T J Kane, a councillor at the City of Collingwood. In the early hours of Saturday 1 December 1934, as a result of the 1934 Victorian floods, the original bridge was washed downstream and damaged beyond repair. A ferry service replaced the bridge beginning in the days following the collapse. A replacement bridge was constructed in 1935, resembling the design of another bridge further upstream linking Kew to the Yarra Bend Asylum.

The suspension of the bridge is made of undressed timber posts, and the deck of the bridge is also wooden. The suspension is made up of steel cables.
