= Clifton Hill Shot Tower =

Shot tower in Melbourne, Victoria, Australia

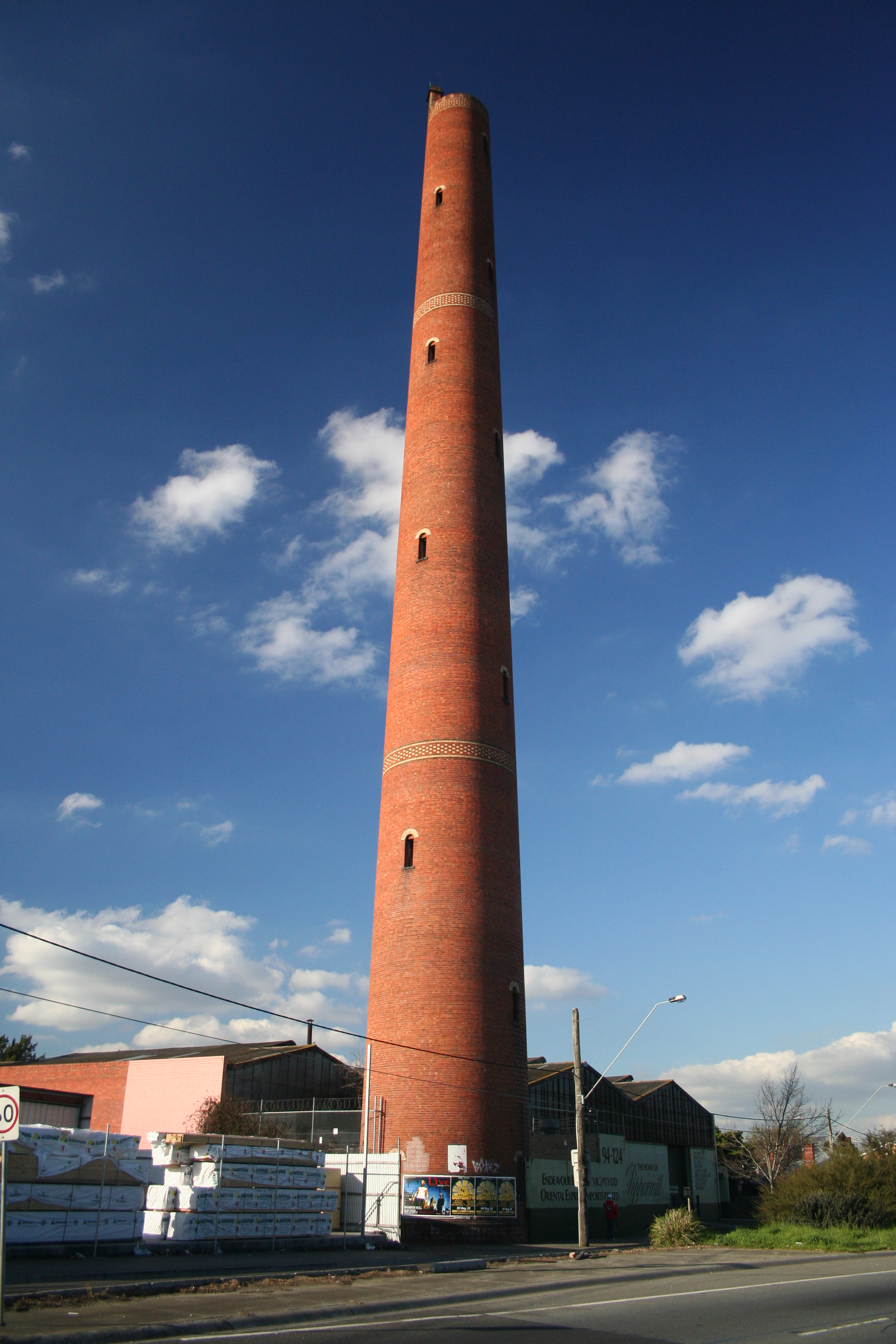
- Interactive map of the Clifton Hill Shot Tower area

General information
- Location: 94 Alexandra Parade, Clifton Hill
- Coordinates: 37°47′39″S 144°59′26″E
- Completed: 1882

Height
- Height: 69 metres (226 ft)

The Clifton Hill Shot Tower is a 69-metre (226 ft) cylindrical shot tower located in Clifton Hill, a suburb of Melbourne, Australia. The Clifton Hill Shot Tower held the title of Australia's tallest structure from its construction until 1905. Recognised by Guinness World Records, the landmark is acclaimed as the second tallest shot tower in the world. The shot tower is on the Victorian Heritage Register.

== History ==
Clifton Hill Shot Tower was built beside Alexandra Parade (Then called Reilly Street) with its associated factory for Richard Hodgson in 1882 to manufacture lead shot and resembles a chimney. Lead shot production required a tall structure where molten lead could be dropped from the top, forming spherical droplets that would solidify during their descent and cool in water tanks at the bottom. The tower was operated by the Coops family, who also managed Coops Shot Tower, now located within the Melbourne Central Shopping Centre.

The tower continued to produce lead shot until the early 1960s when advancements in manufacturing processes and materials rendered the tower obsolete. However, instead of demolishing the historic structure, it was preserved and later converted into a tourist attraction and a symbol of Melbourne's industrial heritage.

Urban legend states that infamous Melbourne biker and gangster, 'Chopper' Read buried a body at the bottom of the Shot Tower, although this remains unproven.

In 2024, the tower was defaced by the graffiti vandals behind the "Pam the Bird" tag, among other Melbourne landmarks.

== Operation method ==
During its operational years, the tower employed a gravity-based production method. Molten lead was poured into a cauldron at the top of the tower, and through a series of sieves and funnels, the lead droplets would fall freely and gradually solidify as they made their way down. By the time the lead droplets reached the bottom, they would have cooled and hardened into perfectly spherical shot pellets.

== Cultural significance ==
Sir Neil Cossons, founder of the Ironbridge Gorge Museum Trust and former chairman of English Heritage, has verified the importance of the Clifton Hill Shot Tower. Cossons, recognised as the leading authority on industrial heritage in Britain, has provided extensive guidance on conservation and management both in the UK and internationally. In 2014, he played a key role in nominating Japanese industrial heritage sites from the period of 1850-1910, which exemplify the emergence of industrial Japan, to be inducted as World Heritage sites. On 1 May 2010, during his visit to Melbourne to explore various industrial sites, he personally inspected the Clifton Hill shot tower. For Cossons, the tower stood out as the highlight of the day, as he had extensively studied shot towers worldwide, believes that the Clifton Hill shot tower boasts a uniquely remarkable design characterised by its scale, architecture, and intricately patterned brickwork.

The Clifton Hill Shot Tower was the tallest building in Australia from its completion in 1882 until 1930. It is one of only three remaining shot towers in Australia, with the others being the Taroona Shot Tower, Tasmania and Coop's Shot Tower located within the Melbourne Central Shopping Centre.

== Access ==
The shot tower is easily visible from both Alexandra Parade and the northern end of Hoddle Street.

== See also ==
- List of tallest structures built before the 20th century
