= Melbourne Central Shopping Centre =

Shopping centre in Melbourne, Victoria, Australia

Melbourne Central
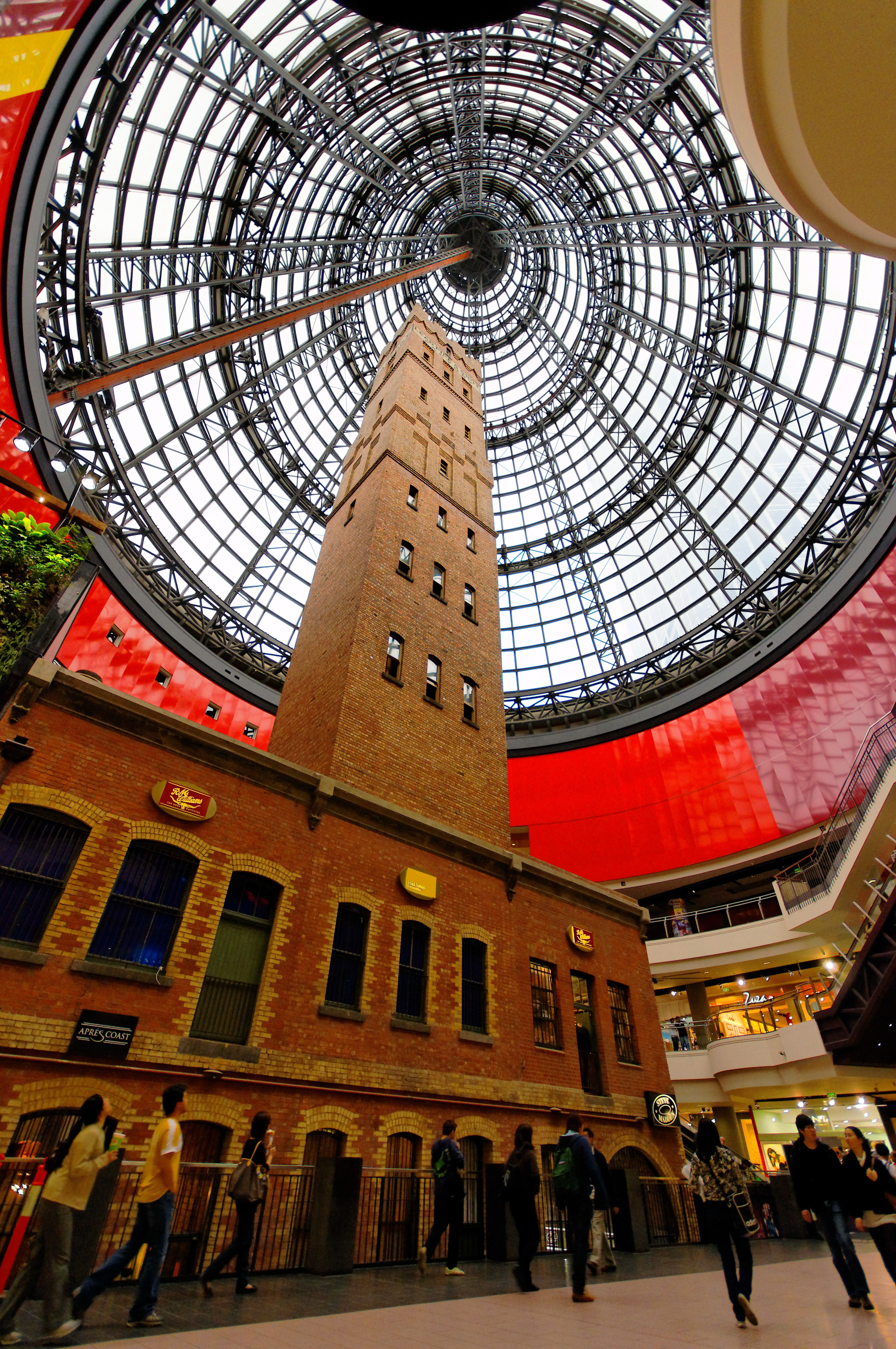
- Looking up to Coop's Shot Tower and the glass cone inside Melbourne Central
- Location: Melbourne, Victoria, Australia
- Coordinates: 37°48′36″S 144°57′46″E
- Address: Cnr LaTrobe and Swanston Streets, Melbourne VIC 3000
- Opened: 11 September 1991; 35 years ago
- Developer: Kumagai Gumi
- Manager: GPT Group
- Owner: GPT Group
- Architect: Hassel with Kisho Kurokawa (1991), Ashton Raggatt McDougall (2002-2005 & 2010-2011)
- Num. of stores: 262
- Num. of anchor tenants: 2
- Floor area: 55,700 m^{2} (599,550 sq ft)
- Floors: 6
- Parking: 880 spaces
- Public transit: Melbourne Central; State Library of Victoria and Elizabeth Street; Lonsdale Street
- Website: www.melbournecentral.com.au

Melbourne Central is a large shopping centre, office and public transport hub in the Melbourne central business district. It is located on the corner of La Trobe Street and Swanston Street.

== History ==
=== 20th century ===
==== Origins ====
The site of Melbourne Central on the city block bounded by Lonsdale, Swanston, La Trobe and Elizabeth streets was once the industrial heartland of Melbourne covered by small commercial and industrial buildings mixed with small hotels, two churches and the Coop's Shot Tower.

==== Construction ====
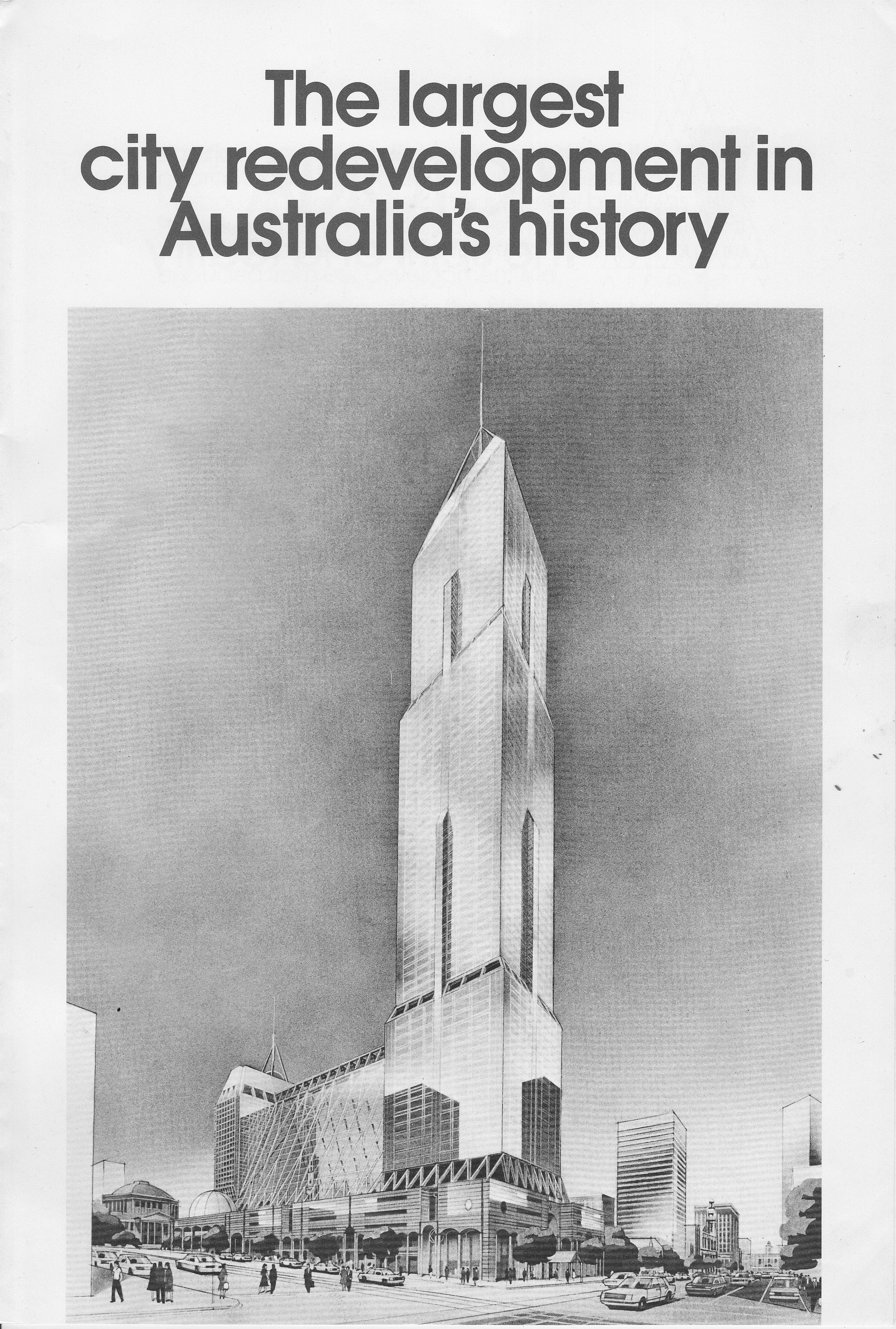
Original design in 1985

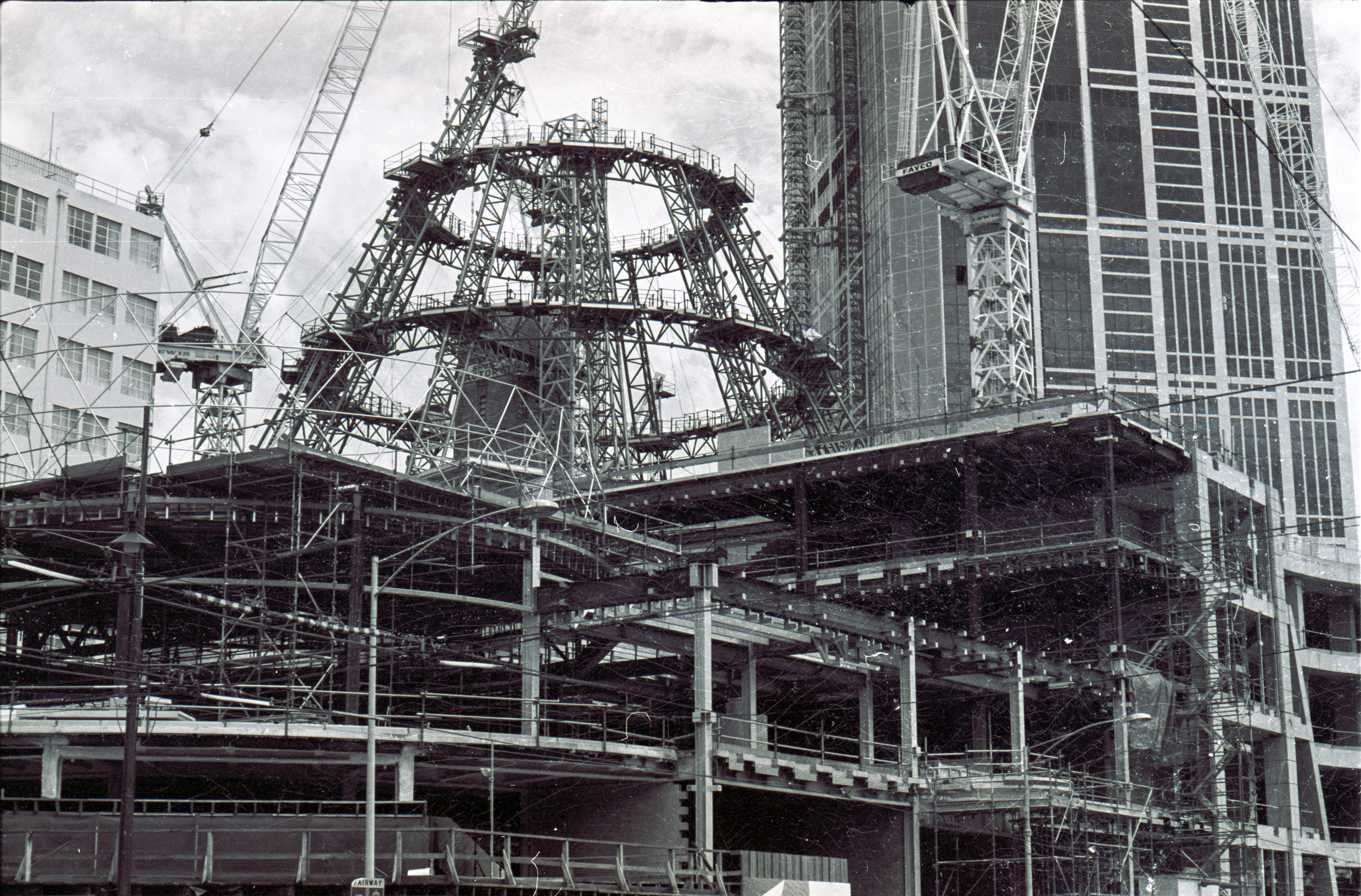
1989 - Melbourne Central during construction, including the glass cone around the shot tower.

The land was studied in 1964, in conjunction with the proposed City Loop underground railway. Early work on the site commenced in 1971 when land on the south side of La Trobe Street was acquired, to enable the cut and cover construction of Museum Station (now known as Melbourne Central Station). Museum Station opened on 24 January 1981 and was the first station to open on the CIty Loop.

While construction on the railway line had been ongoing throughout this period, the State Government had searched for an anchor tenant for the development. However, the search was not successful and the Government decided in 1983 that a private developer should be sought. A total of 58 submissions had been received from developers by the time registrations closed in March 1984.

A Government panel sat in April 1985 to evaluate the responses, and one month later announced their preferred scheme: designed by Hassell Architects for EKG Developments, a joint venture between Australian property developer Essington Limited and Japanese construction firm Kumagai Gumi. The project comprised an 85 floor office tower, with a hotel at the Swanston Street end, joined by a huge sloping walled atrium 20 floors high opening down to the station platforms, designed by Hassell. The St Francis church, the Church of Christ in Swanston Street and the Coops Shot Tower were to be retained and used in the development.

The $1.2 billion contract was signed soon after but without Essington Limited, who were removed by the State Government after a number of directors were linked to the Nugan Hand Bank. It was also at this time that Kisho Kurokawa was brought on board as architect, with Hassell and Bates, Smart & McCutcheon compensated by becoming the joint documenters of the scheme. The plan was scaled back, with the hotel removed and the office tower reduced to 72 storeys and then 55, and the atrium reduced to a tall cone and a circular opening through the shopping levels.

The project was approved in May 1987 by the State Government and construction began shortly after. This construction involved the addition of a row of shops connecting to Lonsdale Street, and the 19th century warehouses and four laneways and many other buildings were demolished to make way for the new structures. A footbridge was built to connect to the Myer store on Lonsdale Street. An anchor tenant was also signed on (the involvement of the Japanese Sumitomo Bank on the project), with Japanese department store Daimaru to cover six floors of the shopping centre. Connell Wagner were the civil and structural engineers for the project. Mechanical, electrical and hydraulic services were provided by Norman Disney & Young. Rankin & Hill did the fire services.

==== 1990s: opening ====
Melbourne Central opened on 11 September 1991 with 160 specialty stores, 30 cafes and food outlets and a six level Japanese department store Daimaru. Around 3,000 people attended the opening of Melbourne Central, and its motto was 'The life of the city'. The Daimaru department store was the first Daimaru store to open in Australia and an attempt by the Japanese chain to compete with nearby Australian established department stores such as Myer, Georges and David Jones.

Melbourne Central was built on top of Museum Station (now Melbourne Central Station) with direct access to the shopping centre and station concourse via escalators. The Melbourne Central Office Tower is 210 metres (690 ft) high with 57 storeys of which 46 are for office use. The shopping centre contains six levels of retail built around the existing the 50-metre (160 ft) high heritage listed Coops Shot Tower which was built in 1888. The tower became a focal point and symbol of Melbourne Central. It is enclosed by an 80-metre (260 ft) high glass cone known as the 'Magic Cone' which weighs 490 tonnes and has 924 glass panes. The cone is the largest of its kind in the world and was built in reference to the large dome of the adjacent State Library of Victoria. A hot-air balloon and a biplane originally dangled in mid-air underneath the cone, but were removed as part of a redevelopment.

The original six levels of retail were organised into five different areas known as "shopping worlds": Historic World, Crystal World, Action World, Urban World and International World.

Melbourne Central also featured a giant video screen, murals depicting trades throughout the ages, a rooftop amusement park, a three-storey glass butterfly enclosure, waterfall water feature, and the famous Marionette Watch. The Marionette Watch was designed by Seiko and is located opposite the shot tower and hangs off Level 2. It was originally connected to a 12.5 metre, two tonne chain. Every hour, on the hour, a marionette display drops down from the bottom of the watch with an Australian galahs, cockatoos and two minstrels performing Waltzing Matilda, under the watchful gaze of some koalas.

The centre has a large multi-level underground carpark with over 1,600 spaces and also has an undercover footbridge across Lonsdale and Little Lonsdale streets connecting to Myer and the CBD retail heart on Bourke Street.

On 11 September 1993 a 2,300m² Toys "R" Us store opened on the ground level of Melbourne Central. The opening of the store attracted a record of 250,000 people at the time.

Melbourne Central was the film location of Mr. Nice Guy which was released in 1997 and starred Jackie Chan.

In May 1999, GPT Group purchased 97.1% stake of Melbourne Central from Kumagai Gumi for $408 million after a five-year sale. Kumagai Gumi never made a profit on Melbourne Central and was forced to sell the ownership of the centre whilst retaining the 2.9% stake to write the asset off over 20 years. In 2001 Kumagai Gumi sold their remaining share to GPT for $17 million.

=== 21st century ===
==== 2000s ====
On 25 September 2001, Daimaru Inc announced that it would close and liquidate its two stores in Australia. The store in Pacific Fair on the Gold Coast closed on 31 January 2002, and the Melbourne Central Daimaru closed on 31 July 2002. Daimaru paid $30 million (representing five years' worth of rent) to terminate its lease agreement early, which was due to expire in 2016. Daimaru never turned a profit on the store, costing its shareholders approximately $200 million. With half the total retail space empty due to the loss of Daimaru, GPT announced a $195 million plan to renovate the centre in April 2002 by refitting the old Daimaru space into mini majors, specialty stores, entertainment and leisure on the upper levels and a new lower ground level on the existing station concourse.

Work began on the redevelopment in September 2002 and it was designed by architects Ashton Raggatt McDougall and ARM Architecture who described it as a "tired, old building", inappropriate for Melbourne. It aimed to open the complex to more natural light, new street-front shopping strips, and bubble-like additions to the footbridge across Little Lonsdale Street, but largely retain the design of Kurokawa.

Work began on the access to the adjacent Melbourne Central railway station in December 2002 with the temporary closure of the La Trobe Street entrance and redirection of commuters to the Elizabeth Street and Swanston Street entrances. This stage of construction involved linking the station concourse with the Lonsdale Street building occupied by Toys "R" Us. Toys "R" Us vacated the centre in January 2003 following the termination of its lease. This development created a new lower ground level from Lonsdale Street to La Trobe Street. incorporating a new Coles Express supermarket (now Coles Central), a fresh food and essential service precinct, a food court with McDonald's, KFC and six food outlets, and a new ticket office for the station.

This development removed direct access to the station concourse from Swanston Street, with the escalators closed in November 2003 and replaced by escalators from the atrium under the cone in the shopping centre, making the path for rail passengers longer and more convoluted. The concourse under La Trobe Street was integrated into the shopping centre with the installation of numerous shops. This development faced criticism as the direct entrance to the underground station concourse from the tram stop on Swanston Street was removed in favour of a much longer route through the shopping centre, exacerbating overcrowding for rail users in peak times.

Other parts of Melbourne Central were renovated during this $200 million development. The ground level was replaced by specialty stores which specialised in 'street urban fashion stores'. A laneway was carved through the centre from La Trobe Street to Little Londale Street to reflect Melbourne's laneway culture.

Levels 1 and 2 specialised in cosmetics, homewares, books and music. A Borders bookstore opened on Level 1 and Freedom Furniture opened on Level 2.

The 12.5 metre, two tonne chain and the Seiko branding on the Marionette Watch was removed during this redevelopment and not replaced.

Parts of the centre opened progressively during 2004 with the entire redevelopment (excluding levels 3-5) completed in December 2004.

On 20 September 2005, a 12-screen Hoyts Cinema opened on levels 3 and 4. The opening of the cinema resulted in the closure of the Hoyts Cinema complex on Bourke Street. The rest of Level 3 including the Melbourne Central Lion Hotel, entertainment venues and various restaurants and bars had opened by the end of 2005. The Kingpin Bowling Alley (which operated until 2009) opened in 2006.

A vertical garden was installed on the side of the Coop's Shot Tower as part of the Melbourne International Design Festival in July 2008. Pioneered by internationally renowned French artist and scientist, Patrick Blanc, the garden had no soil and was attached to the wall using PVC plastic. However, the running cost proved expensive and it was replaced with an advertising billboard in 2013.

==== 2010s ====
On 23 June 2010, plans for a $75 million redevelopment were unveiled by GPT. It was done in two stages and designed by the same Ashton Raggatt McDougall Architects from its 2002-2005 redevelopment.

The first stage of the $75 million redevelopment started in September 2010 at a cost of $30 million. This development involved the closure and relocation of the Level 2 'Food on Two' food court.

In late March 2011, a large food court known as the 'Dining Hall' opened on the former space of Freedom Furniture on Level 2. The new food court contained 16 food outlets including fast food options such as McDonald's as well as local independent outlets. A new entrance at Elizabeth Street provided access to the food court from the street and created another cross-block connection through the centre.

In August 2011, a new fashion precinct on the north-eastern side of the centre known as 'The Corner' opened. The Corner contains a mix of international and local urban fashion and lifestyle brands including Nike, Glue, Hype DC, Jeanswest and a Converse flagship store. The Glue store opened on 13 December 2011 on the space of the former 'Food on Two' food court. A new side entrance from the corner of Swanston and La Trobe streets provided access to The Corner from the street. The entrance to The Corner is marked by a unique architectural feature known as 'The Tree', designed to be an iconic Melbourne meeting point.

The second stage of the $75 million redevelopment was to add a third level of shops to the Lonsdale Street building. However, this plan was subject to further investigation and this stage never proceeded past the planning stage.

On 26 April 2012, Strike Bowling opened its venue on Level 3 on the former Kingpin Bowling site. The opening was promoted with a VIP launch party and a social media-driven event in which the Strike Bowling social media manager was lifted by helium balloons in the shopping centre with more helium added for each engagement on social platforms.

In late 2017, JB Hi-Fi opened its store on Level 1.

On 20 August 2018, Funlab opened its B. Lucky & Sons - a gaming arcade, cocktail bar and a pawnshop - on Level 3.

On 27 May 2019 a new 2,500m² dining space on the corner of Elizabeth and La Trobe streets opened. Known as ELLA (where Elizabeth Street meets La Trobe Street), it was designed to offer high-end food of the sort found in Asia’s railway stations. Six restaurants opened as part of the first phase of ELLA. ELLA also features a mural wall with street art designed by local artists and a crowdDJ touch screen jukebox that patrons can use to play music. Phase two of ELLA opened on 27 June 2019, with four more outlets completed. The final restaurant to open in ELLA opened on 6 July 2020, which brought the final number of food and drink outlets to 20.

==== 2020s ====
During the COVID-19 restrictions in 2020, Melbourne Central underwent a $2 million refurbishment of the lower ground level food court known as 'The Eatery'. The refurbishment included new flooring and a feature ceiling, new joinery, an overlay of contemporary lighting and new furniture. This refurbishment was completed in June 2020.

On 7 May 2022, a 559m² LEGO Certified Store opened on the former Glue store space on Level 2. The store featured a five metre long Lego model of a Route 96 Melbourne tram (made from 651,489 bricks), a Minifigure station where you could create your own Lego Minifigures, and a mosaic maker.

On 15 November 2023, Australia's first Monopoly Dreams indoor theme park opened across 1700m² on the lower ground level. It featured two distinct areas: Monopoly City and Monopoly Mansion, and was set across the two zones which were inspired by Melbourne's trams and street art culture with a total of 15 attractions, including a 4D theatre and a chance wheel. Monopoly Dreams also contained a cafe and a retail store.

== Other proposals ==
On 28 May 2019, GPT Group proposed to build a 12-storey timber office building on top of Melbourne Central on Lonsdale Street. The building was to be known as 'Frame' and feature 19,400m² of office space with a 'hotel inspired sky lobby' on levels 5 and 6. Frame would also feature an elevated garden, two new retail levels that transition into the existing centre, new rooftop space and a new dining precinct. Drewery Place would be refurbished into becoming another entry for the commercial tower featuring a small cafe, with the rooftop to face north and have views of the iconic Melbourne Central cone. However, due to the COVID-19 pandemic this proposal was put on hold on 30 April 2020.

== Tenants ==
Melbourne Central has 55,700m² of space. The major retailers include Coles Central, Cotton On, LEGO Certified Store, JB Hi-Fi, B. Lucky & Sons, Fitness First, Melbourne Lion Hotel, Monopoly Dreams, Strike Bowling Bar and Hoyts Cinema.

== Transport ==
The centre is integrated into the Melbourne Central railway station which operates metropolitan trains. Surrounding tram and bus stops also provide public transport access to the complex.

Yarra Trams operates thirteen services on the surrounding Swanston, Elizabeth and La Trobe streets.

Melbourne Central has 14 bus routes nearby serving suburbs including Doncaster and Warrandyte.

Melbourne Central has an underground multi-level carpark with 880 spaces.

Swanston Street

- : East Coburg – South Melbourne Beach
- : Melbourne University – East Malvern
- : Melbourne University – Malvern
- : Moreland – Glen Iris
- : Melbourne University – Kew
- : Melbourne University – East Brighton
- : Melbourne University – Carnegie
- : Melbourne University – Camberwell

Elizabeth Street

- : North Coburg – Flinders Street Station
- : West Maribyrnong – Flinders Street Station
- : Airport West – Flinders Street Station

La Trobe Street

- : St Vincent's Plaza – Central Pier Docklands
- : City Circle

Kinetic Melbourne operates four bus routes from Lonsdale Street (Melbourne Central side), under contract to Public Transport Victoria:

- 200 : to Bulleen
- 207 : to Westfield Doncaster
- 250 : to La Trobe University Bundoora campus
- 251 : to Northland Shopping Centre

Kinetic Melbourne operates thirteen bus routes from Lonsdale Street (Myer side), under contract to Public Transport Victoria:

- 250 : to Queen Street
- 251 : to Queen Street
- 302 : to Queen Street
- 303 : to Queen Street
- 304 : to King Street
- 305 : to Spencer Street (Peak Hour only)
- 309 : to Queen Street
- 318 : to Spencer Street
- 350 : to Queen Street
- SmartBus 905 : to Spencer Street
- SmartBus 906 : to Spencer Street
- SmartBus 907 : to Spencer Street
- SmartBus 908 : to Spencer Street (Peak Hour only)

Kinetic Melbourne operates eleven bus routes from Swanston/Lonsdale Streets (QV), under contract to Public Transport Victoria:

- 302 : to Box Hill station
- 303 : to Ringwood North
- 304 : to Westfield Doncaster
- 305 : to The Pines Shopping Centre (Peak Hour only)
- 309 : to Donvale
- 318 : to Deep Creek Reserve (Doncaster East)
- 350 : to La Trobe University Bundoora campus
- SmartBus 905 : to The Pines Shopping Centre
- SmartBus 906 : to Warrandyte
- SmartBus 907 : to Mitcham station
- SmartBus 908 : to The Pines Shopping Centre (Peak Hour only)

== Incidents ==
- On 4 November 2017, a brawl occurred on Level 3 outside the Asian Beer Cafe. Up to 10 men were involved in the brawl which sent security guards to hospital. The brawl started after a man was kicked out of the bar around 8:30pm. The man then became angry and called his friends, who attacked the security guards. A nearby restaurant was forced to close early due to the brawl.
- On 16 August 2019, a violent clash between two groups of youths occurred. The youths (understood to be part of rival street gangs) charged through the centre around 9:15pm throwing punches. No one was hurt in the incident.

== Gallery ==
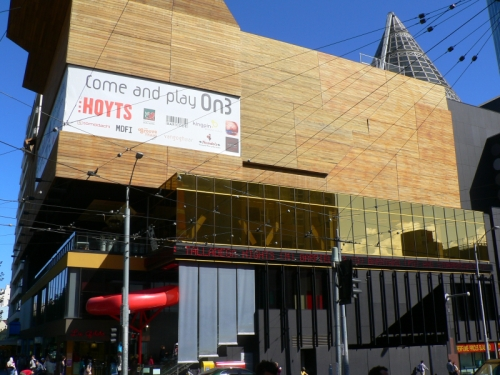
Main entrance podium, corner La Trobe and Swanston Streets after re-development.

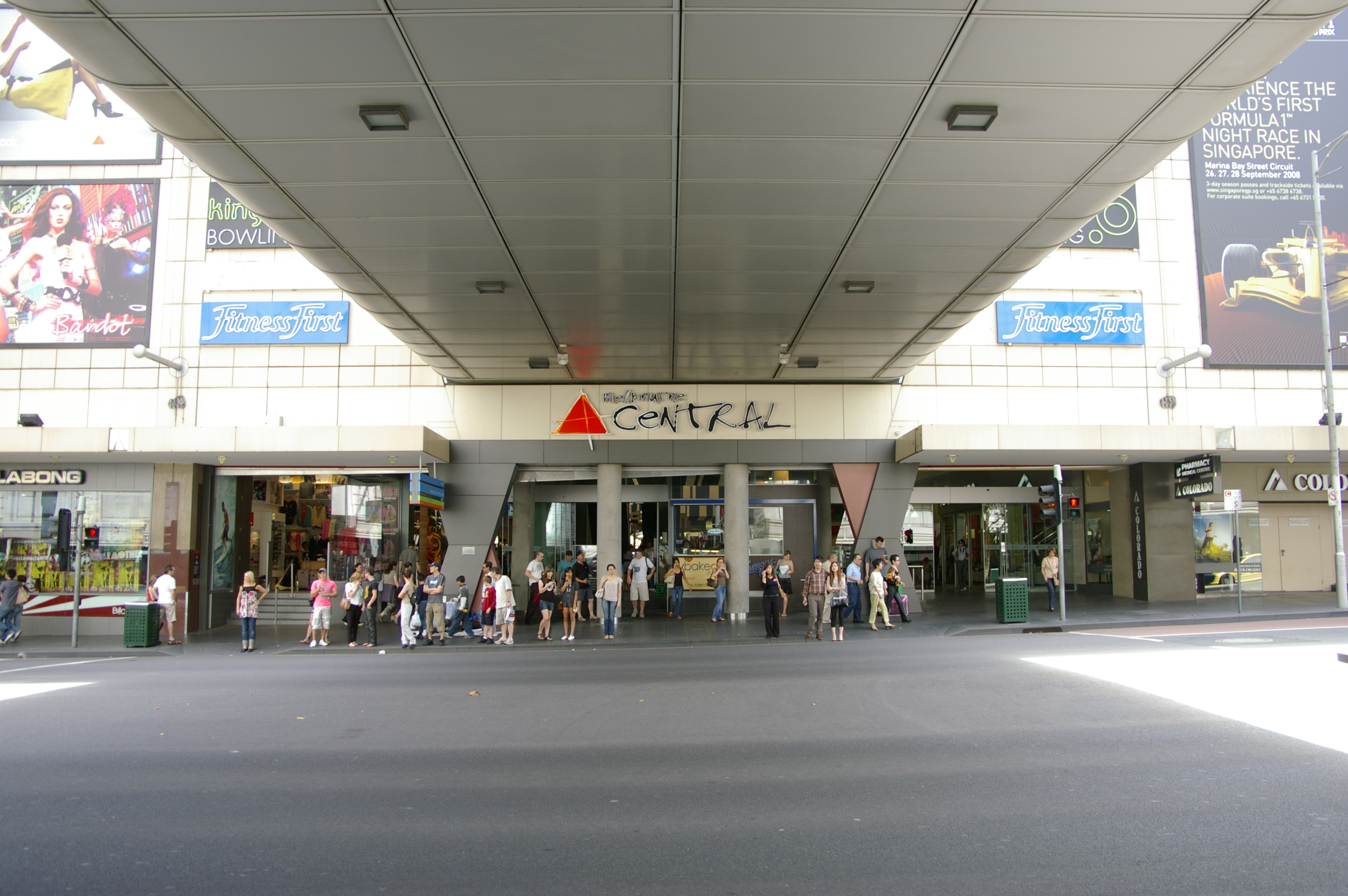
Melbourne Central, Lonsdale Street entrance, below bridge to Myer Melbourne.

Underneath the iconic glass cone

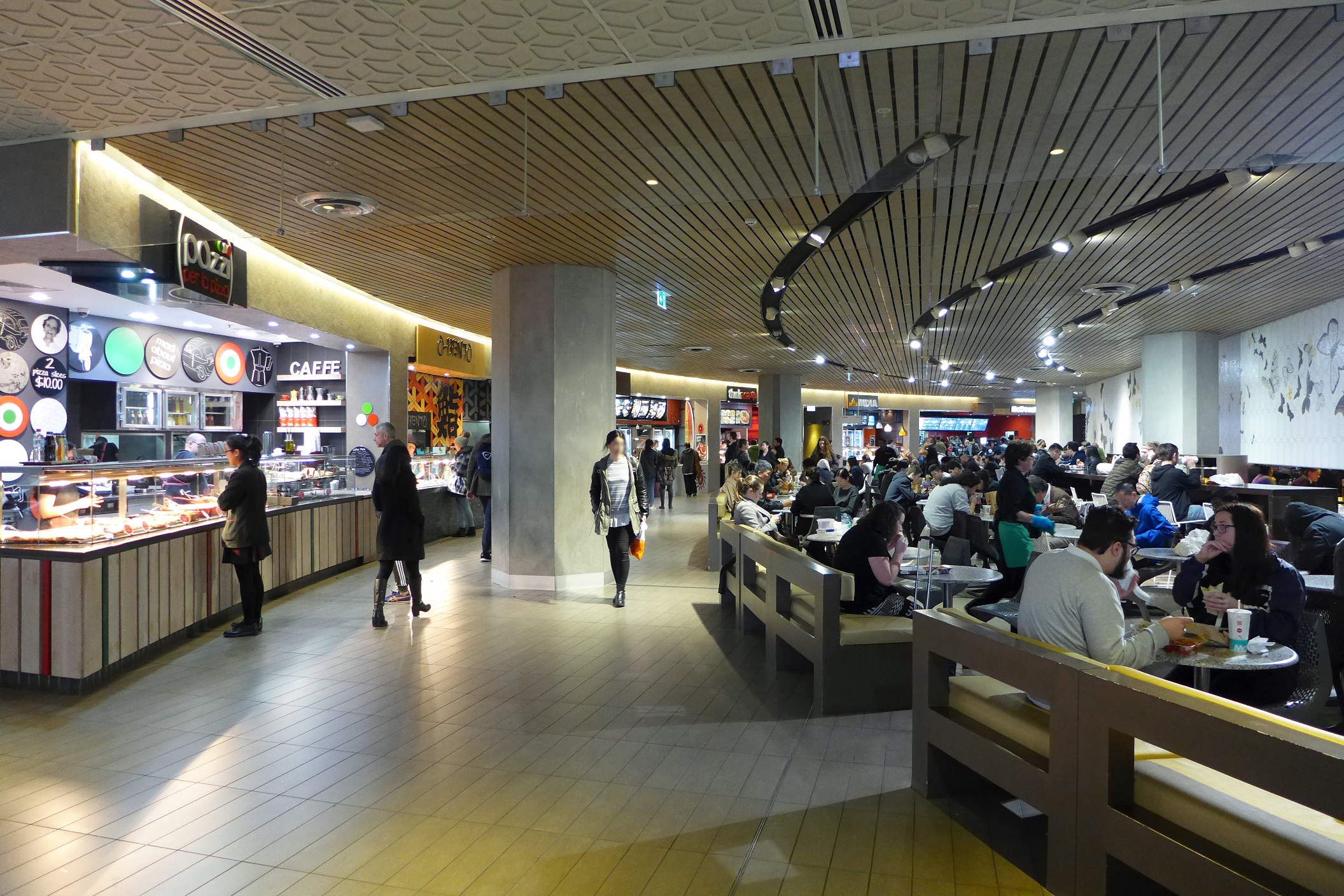
Dining Hall Food Court

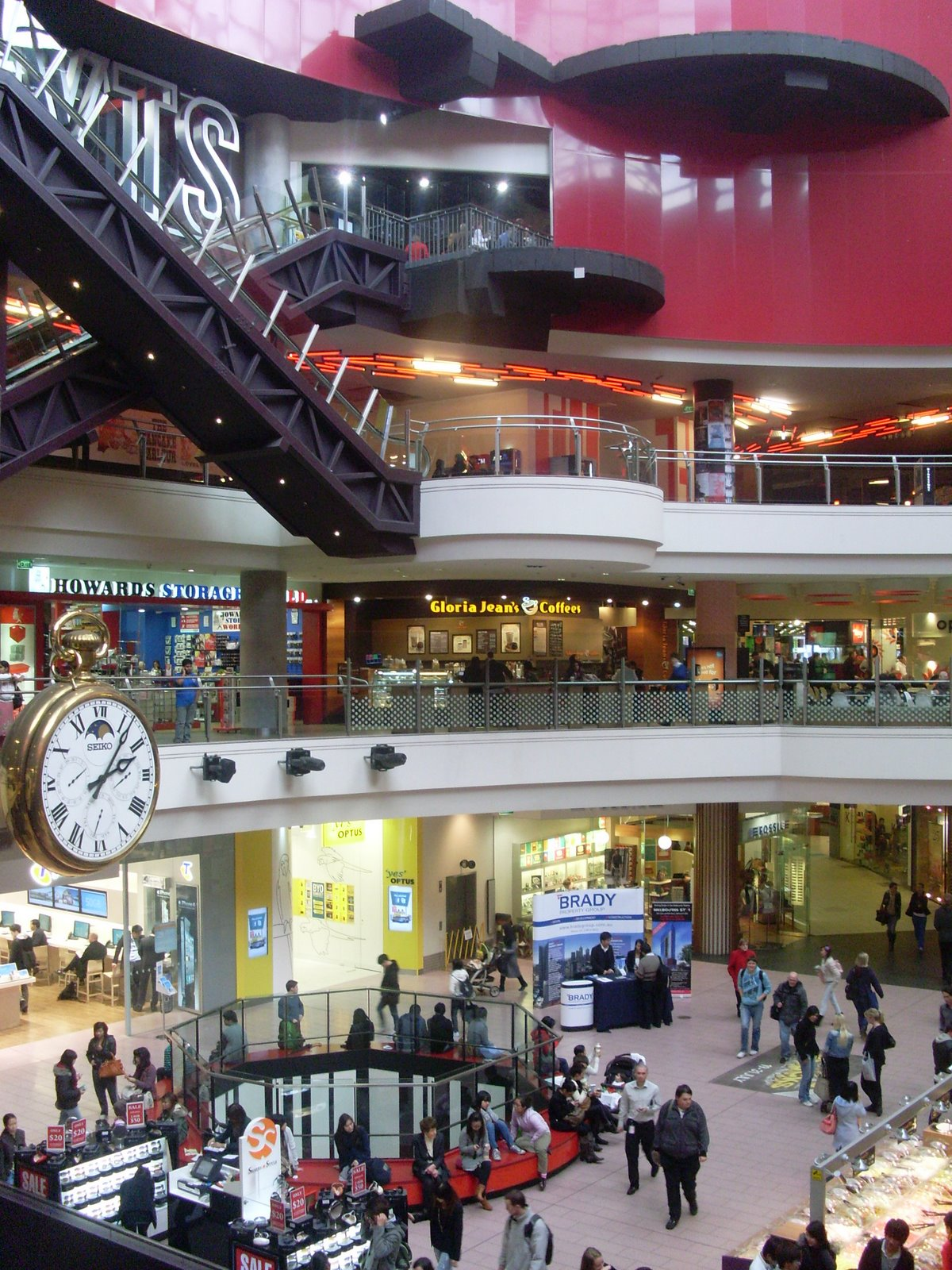
Various floors in central area. (2010)

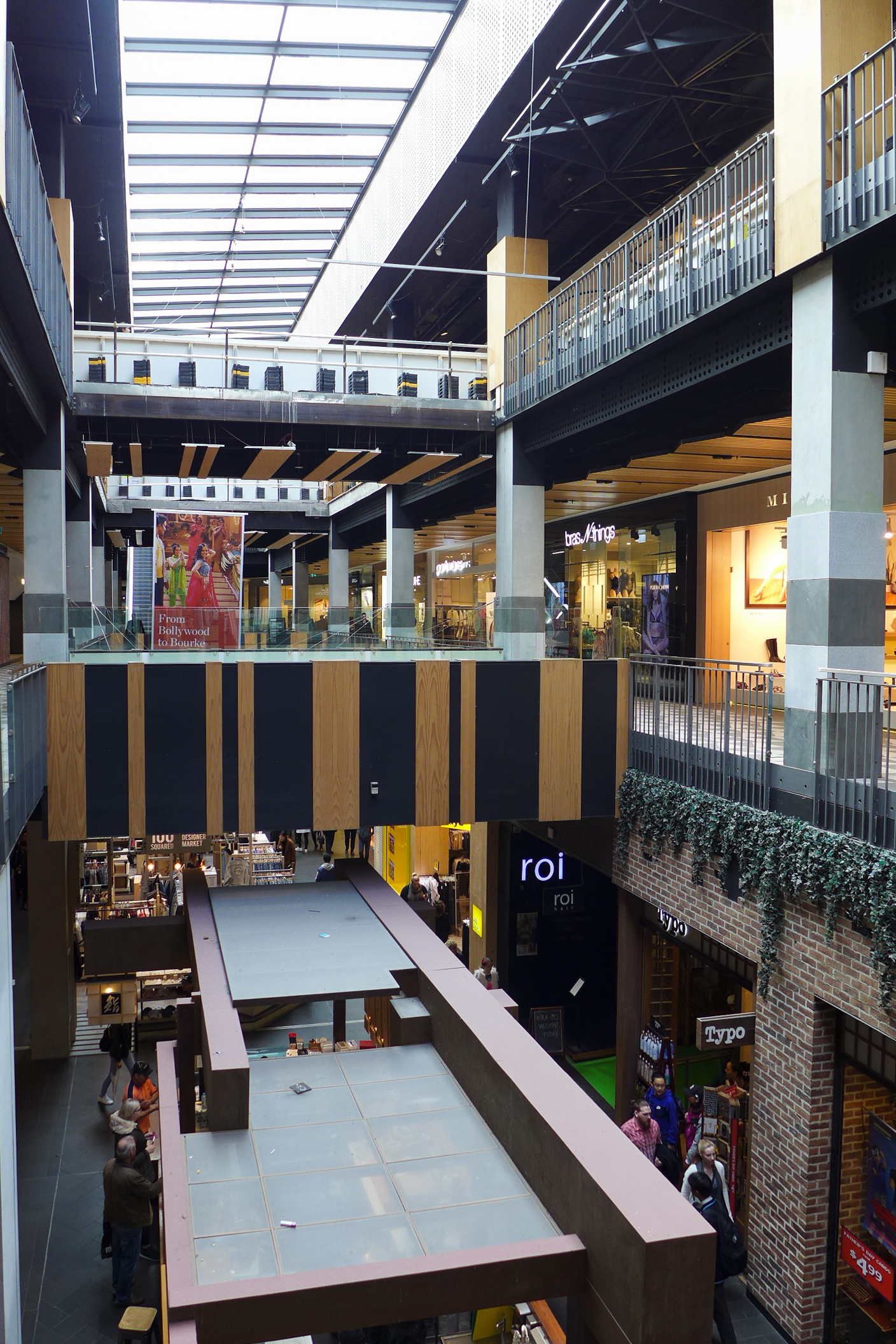
The three levels of shops

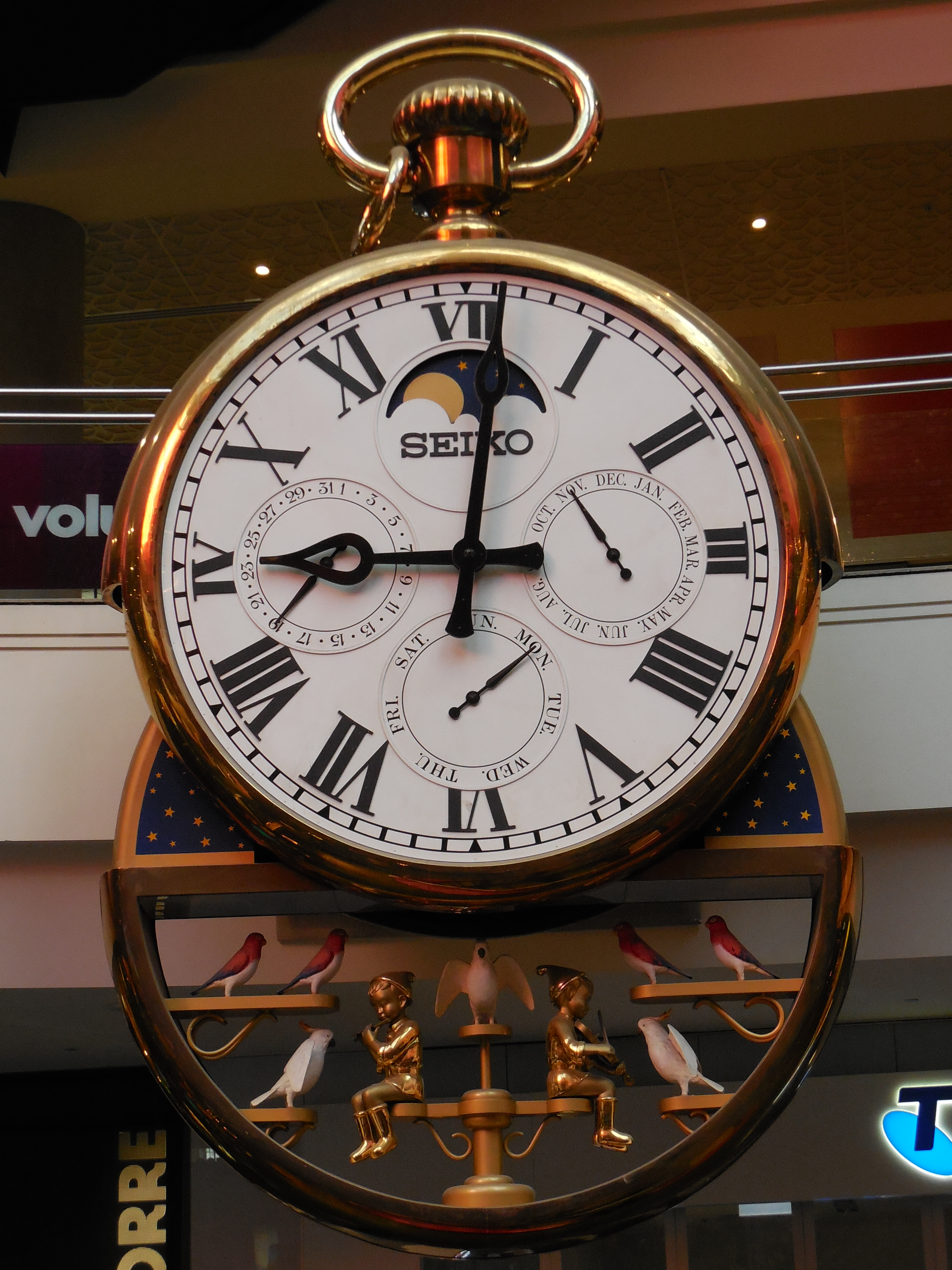
The Marionette Watch

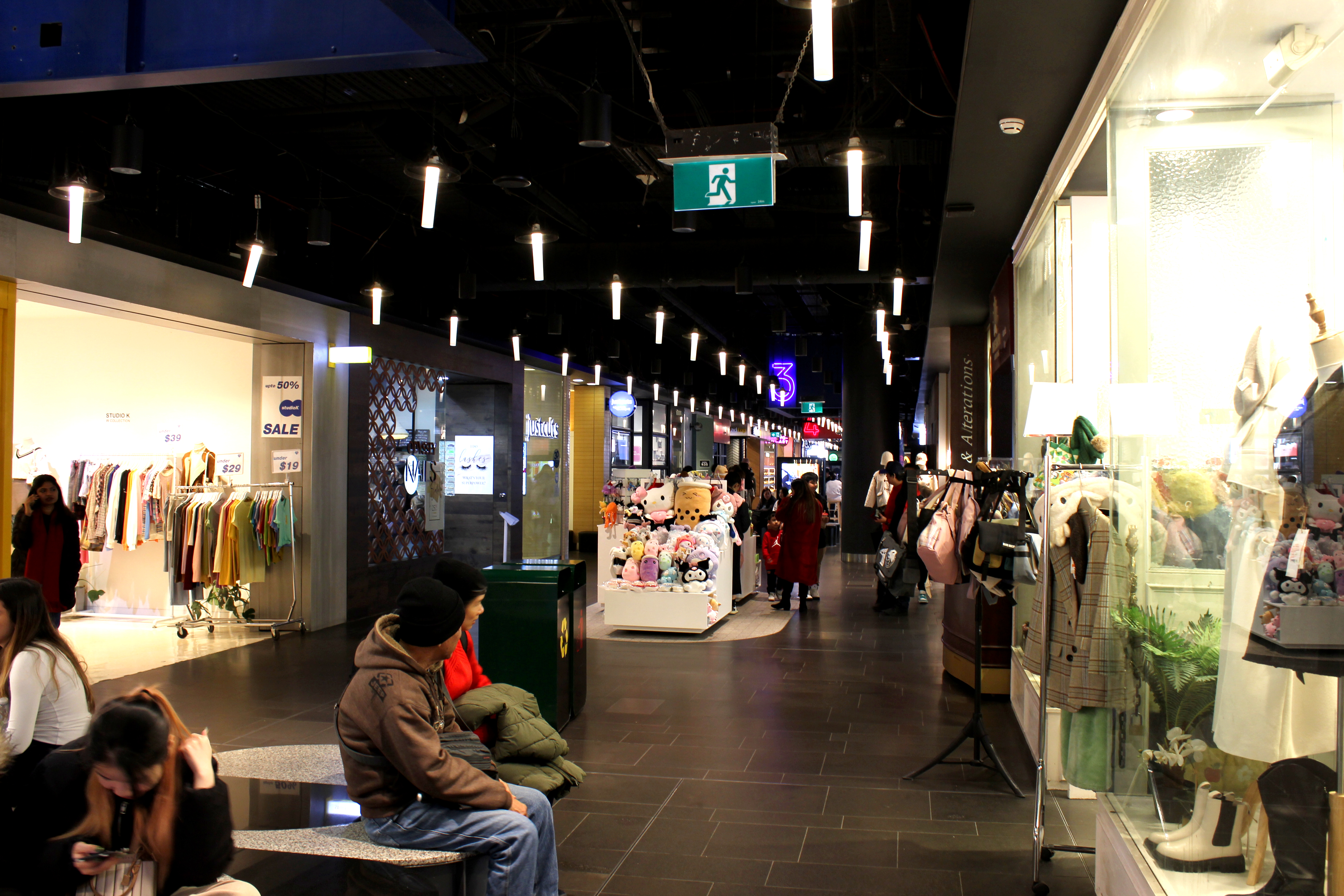
Photo of the Basement level in Melbourne Central looking towards Melbourne Central Station after refurbishment.

== See also ==
- List of shopping centres in Australia
