= 1934 Victorian floods =

Event in Victoria, Australia

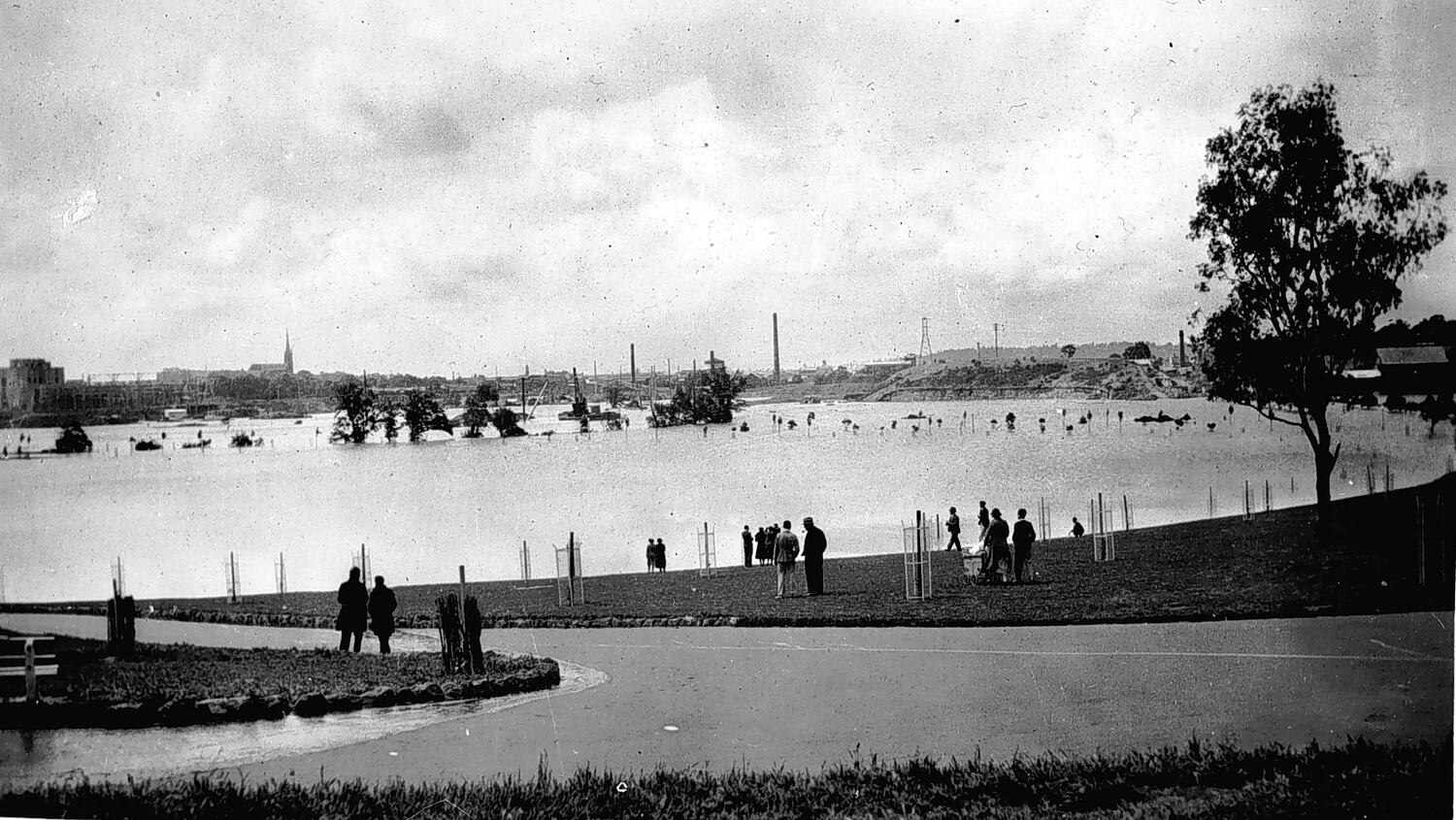
- People watching the flooded Yarra River at Como Park in South Yarra looking north-east.
- Date: 29 November 1934 – 5 December 1934
- Location: Victoria (state); Melbourne, Yarra Valley and South Gippsland
- Deaths: 36

The 1934 Victorian floods was a series of flooding events throughout the central and eastern areas of the Australian state of Victoria between November and December 1934. These were the largest and deadliest floods in Victoria's history, killing 36 people and displacing over 6,000.

== Background ==
=== Weather ===
1934 had been a wet year for Victoria. Caused by the highest recorded rainfall in 80 years, there had been floods recorded across central, eastern and northern Victoria in January, Elwood in April and the area around Castlemaine and Murray River in October. High rainfall levels continued throughout the year causing river levels to rise and the ground to be waterlogged.

On Thursday 29 November a strong cold front approached Melbourne and other parts of southern Victoria after a notably hot day. This brought heavy, driving rain and gale-force winds of over 100 km/h (62 mph) that continued throughout Friday 30 November and into the early morning of Saturday.

== Extent ==
=== Melbourne ===
Over 140mm of rain was recorded in Melbourne over the two day period from 29 November to 30 November. The flood marker at the Johnston Street Bridge in Abbotsford recorded a water height of 12.06 metres, higher than the previous record from 1891 of 11.3 metres.

This caused significant flooding and damage was reported in every suburb of Melbourne with those nearest rivers and creeks being the most affected. This flooded thousands of buildings across the city rendering many people homeless.

Suburb	Number of people made homeless
Abbotsford	2,500
Chelsea	700
Kensington	500
Mordialloc	2,500
Richmond	800

The river was reported to be "a series of vast lakes connected by swirling rapids" by The Argus newspaper. Floodwaters broke the river's banks at the Yarra Flats between Heidelberg and Kew, creating a stretch of water over three kilometres wide.

The town of Warrandyte in the middle reaches of the Yarra River suffered severe damage with water rising over 15 metres above its regular height. The houses of 40 residents were damaged or destroyed with the local church and post office completely flooded.

Boathouses along the lower sections of the River were submerged or washed away, including those at Studley Park, Xavier College and Fairfield.

Water flooded several streets and golf courses in the residential eastern suburbs of Kew and Kew East. The Kew Golf Club course was flooded well into the end of December.

Water supply pipes at Fairfield Park were damaged by floodwaters and debris. The pipe was repaired a few days later and raised higher above the river to prevent future disruption.

=== Yarra Valley ===
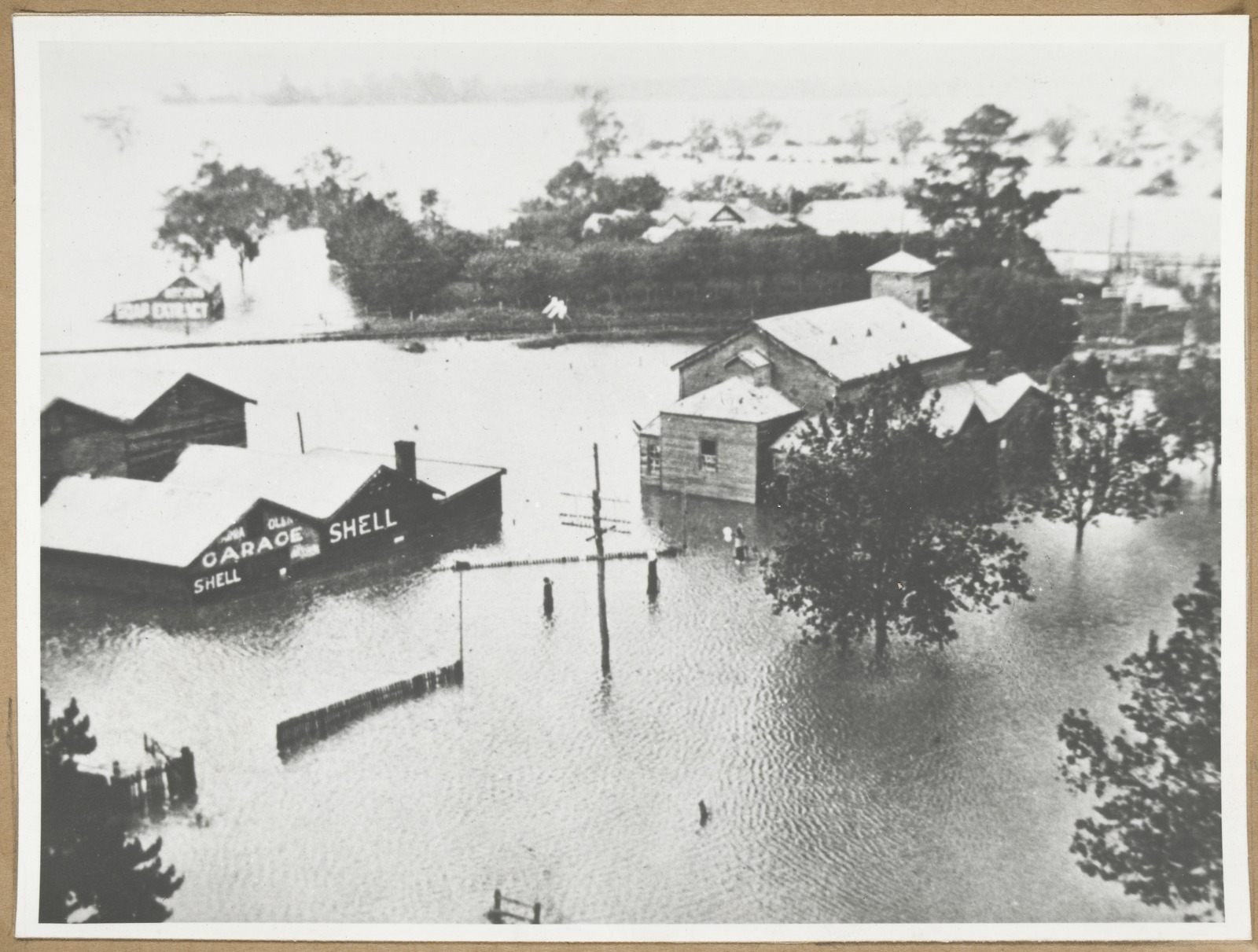
Photo showing centre of Yarra Glen with its church underwater.

The Yarra Valley to the east of Melbourne was especially affected due to the high volume of rain and steep topography of the region. This funnelled rainwater quickly into rivers and valleys where most human settlements and farmland were located.

The town of Warburton lost its water supply when the main was washed away by floodwaters. It remained cut off from other settlements after the main roads and railway to the town was washed away or submerged.

=== South Gippsland ===
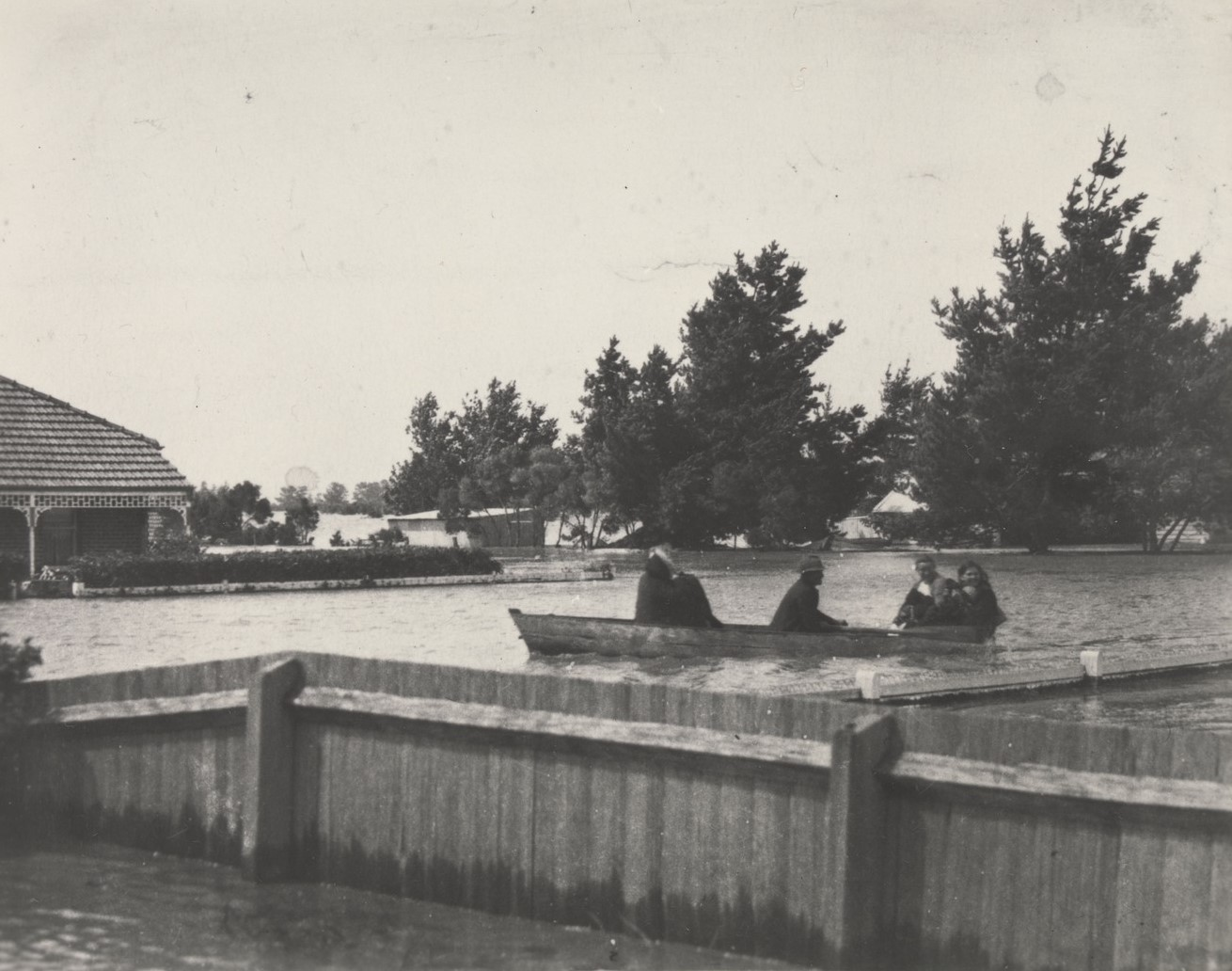
Photo of people in a boat floating down a flooded street in Koo Wee Rup.

The region received more than double the rainfall of that in Melbourne, recording over 380mm at Mount Fatigue. The swampy land around Koo Wee Rup, Korumburra and Leongatha in particular sustained significant damage due to the density of settlements and agricultural activities, with a continuous body of water stretching over 100,000 acres (40,000 ha). Water supplies were cut off from many towns and the town of Koo Wee Rup itself became almost completely surrounded by flooding. The storm and floods directly affected over 4,000 people in the area.

The open cut coal mine supplying power stations in the Latrobe Valley at Yallourn were completely flooded. This seriously threatened Victoria's electricity production with the State Government taking emergency measures to continue supply.

== Deaths ==
36 people were killed as a direct result of the floods or in incidents caused by floodwaters or severe weather. This included deaths by drowning, electrocution and shock.

17 of the deaths were on the coastal steamer T.S.S. Coramba which capsised and sank with all hands in bound from Warrnambool during the storm in the Bass Strait. The wreck's location was not known until 2011 when it was discovered in 66 metre deep water, 15 km (9 mi) south-east of Phillip Island.

== Response ==
Emergency services and government officials were caught off-guard by the scale of the disaster. The significant damage caused to transport, communications and other infrastructure made immediate responses difficult.

Areas of South Gippsland and the Yarra Valley that were cut off by floodwaters were the focus of initial response and relief efforts. Many people were stranded on their property or roofs of buildings were rescued by local authorities or makeshift attempts by others nearby. A relief train carrying emergency supplies and local officials managed to arrive at Koo Wee Rup at 1:35pm on 3 December, including the Victorian Minister for Public Assistance and the Chairman of the Victorian State Rivers and Water Commission. Other 200 people had remained stranded at the railway station and other high points of the town. Further trains brought personnel and supplies to set up a 'canvas city' of over 100 tents to supply food, shelter and healthcare to locals and refugees near the railway station.

It took months to clear damage in South Gippsland. Hundreds of extra workers were employed by local councils to dispose of dead livestock, clean buildings of algae and mud, and repair damaged infrastructure.

== Reactions ==
The Governors-General of Australia, Sir Issac Issacs, and New Zealand, Lord Bledeisloe, sent messages of condolence to the Premier of Victoria, Sir Stanley Argyle.

Pope Pius XI donated £1,000 for flood relief.

== Impacts ==
=== Infrastructure ===
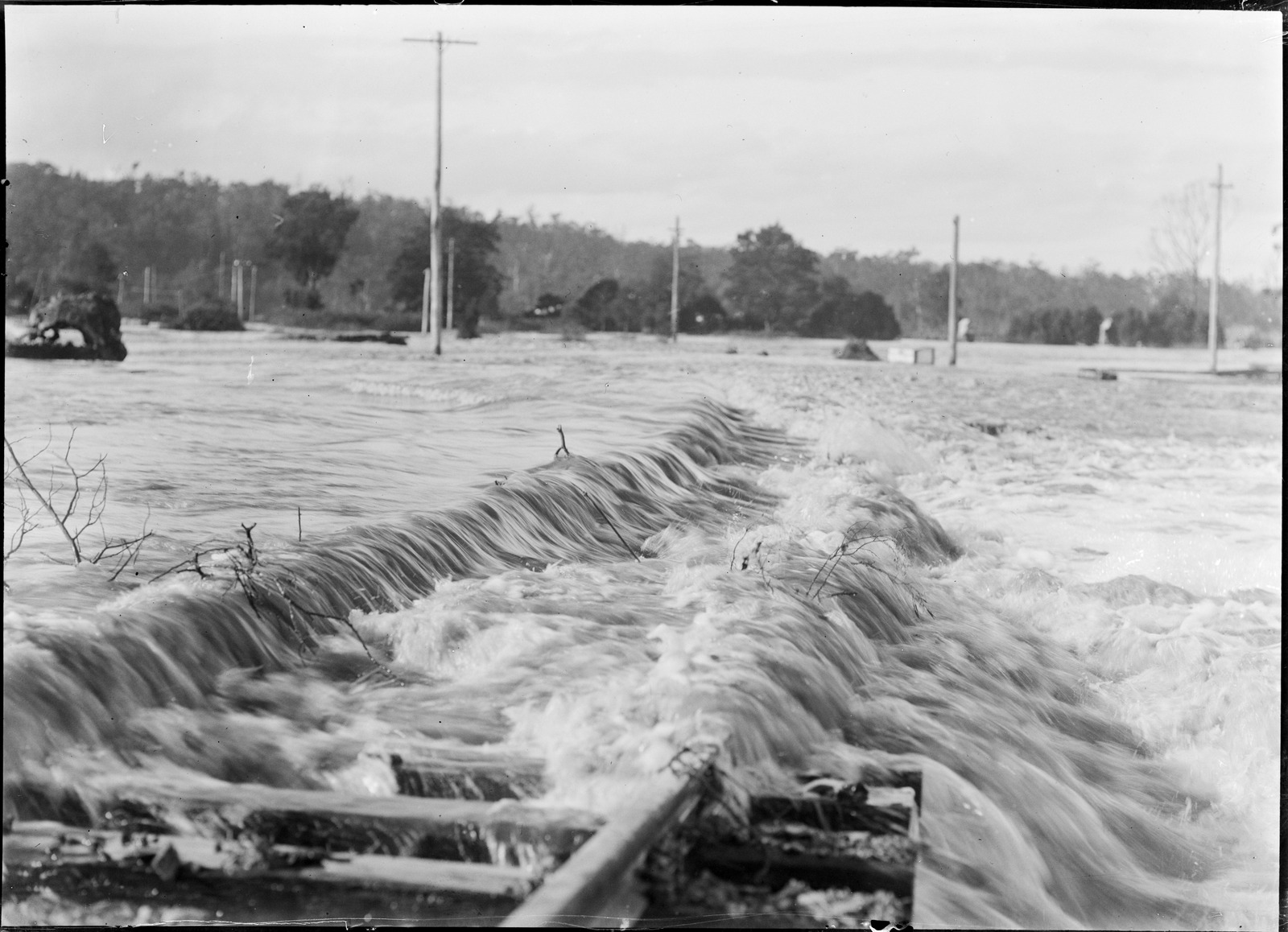
Photo of railway tracks in Yallourn underwater during the floods.

Many roads and railways were damaged or destroyed in Melbourne and other parts of the state. Public transport in Melbourne was disrupted or cancelled for weeks afterwards due to this infrastructure damage.

Trams on Toorak Road did not recommence operating until 4 December, while other tram routes to St Kilda and Kew, Victoria only ran a diverted service.

Trains to Warburton were unable to reach the town for several weeks due to water submerging bridges over the low-lying floodplains near Yarra Glen.

Millions of pounds worth of all types of infrastructure was damaged. The Federal Government granted matched financial assistance to Victoria of up to £250,000 to fund public works to repair damaged or destroyed roads, bridges and other projects. The Victorian Government considered but then committed not to implement a special one-off levy to fund flood relief. A separate amount of £30,000 was also promised to repair and upgrade the drainage systems at Koo Wee Rup.

=== Economy ===
Over 2,000 cattle, 8,600 sheep, 3,000 chickens and many other farm animals around Koo Wee Rup alone were drowned or otherwise killed by the floods, with thousands more reported drowned elsewhere in South Gippsland in the days after the worst of the flooding.

The electricity supply for Victoria was briefly threatened by the extensive flooding and damage caused to the Gippsland coal mines and power stations in Yallourn and surrounding areas. While coal in the mines was unable to be used until the open cut mines could be drained, Victorian Railways constructed a temporary extension of the railway to reach a previously unused dump of coal supplies, unused since 1924.

=== Health ===
State and local governments were acutely worried about the spread of water-borne diseases. Due to the presence of stagnant water and waterlogged buildings, there were fears of typhoid spreading after being discovered in drinking water supplies in several places. Thousands of dead animals also posed a risk, especially in country areas.

== See also ==
- Extreme weather events in Melbourne
- 1956 Murray River flood
