= Coop's Shot Tower =

Shot tower in Victoria, Australia

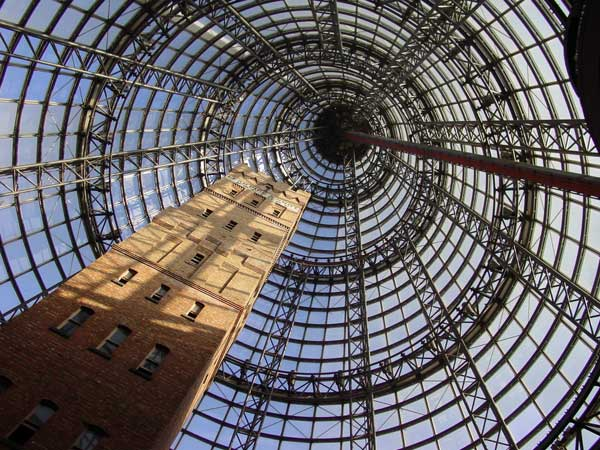
- Coop's Shot Tower, encased by the Melbourne Central cone
- Interactive map of the Coop's Shot Tower area

General information
- Coordinates: 37°48′37″S 144°57′47″E
- Completed: 21 June 1889

Height
- Height: 50 metres (160 ft)

Dimensions
- Other dimensions: furnace firebricks foundations 40ft. deep walls 3 ft. thick

Technical details
- Floor count: 12 landing places

Design and construction
- Main contractor: Messrs. Fenson and Hetherington

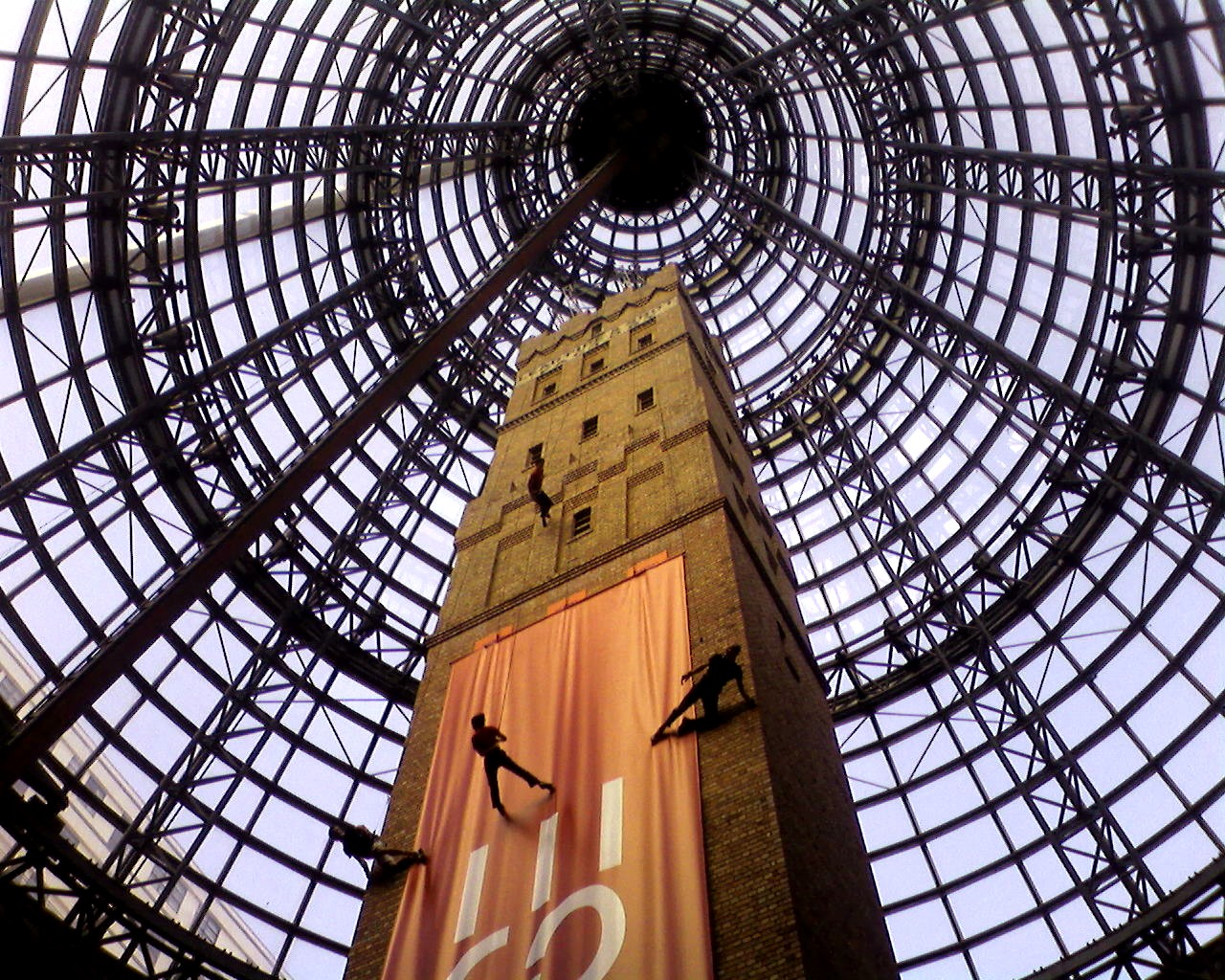
Four people abseiling down the shot tower as part of a promotional event

Coop's Shot Tower is a shot tower located in the heart of the Melbourne CBD, Australia. It was completed in 1889 and is 50 metres (160 ft) high. The historic building was saved from demolition in 1973 and was incorporated into Melbourne Central complex in 1991 underneath an 84 m-high (276 ft) conical glass roof.

Coop's Shot Tower is 9 storeys high, and has 327 steps to the top. The tower produced 6 tonnes (6.6 short tons) of shot weekly up until 1961, when the demand for the lead shot dwindled, because of new firearm regulations. The tower was operated by the Coop family, who also managed Clifton Hill Shot Tower.

A museum called the Shot Tower Museum has been set up inside of the tower at the back of RM Williams and DJI (D1) stores, a tenant in the tower. The tower has been the site of fatalities in 1903 and 1922.

The site is listed on the Victorian Heritage Register.
