= Bristol shot tower =

Bristol shot tower may refer to a number of shot towers in the English city of Bristol:

- The Redcliffe Shot Tower, the first shot tower ever built (in 1782)
- The Cheese Lane Shot Tower, a shot tower built in 1969 to replace the Redcliffe Shot Tower
