= Joseph Moir =

Joseph James Moir (1809–1874) was a prominent builder, ironmonger, citizen and shot manufacturer in 19th century Tasmania. He is best known for building the Taroona Shot Tower, but also built St Mark's Anglican Church, Pontville, issued tokens in his own name during a currency shortage in the colony, and served as an alderman on Hobart City Council.

== Life and family ==
Joseph Moir was born in the Scottish Border town of Kelso in 1809, where he learned his trade as a builder. In 1829, he emigrated with his elder brother John (c. 1807–1876) to the colony of Van Diemen's Land (as Tasmania was then known), sailing on the North Briton from Leith to Hobart via The Cape of Good Hope. (Note: Tasmania Parks gives 1829 as the year of arrival in Hobart, when Moir was twenty, whereas The Victoria Museum dates the voyage from 24 May 1827 to 20 September 1827, calling at the Cape of Good Hope in August. Other sources describe a voyage of the North Briton departing from Leith on 23/24 May 1829 and from the Cape on 10 August 1829, destined for Sydney on 7 October 1829, and arriving in Hobart on 18 September 1829, with passengers "James and John Moir" on board.) His sister Mary (c. 1804–1866) followed her brothers to Hobart in 1832. In 1843, Moir returned to Kelso, where he married Elizabeth Paxton (c. 1822–1875), returning with her to Hobart in early 1844. He had at least five children with Elizabeth: Jane Josephine (b. 1846), (Note: Jane Josephine Moir's birth is dated via her marriage in 1866 to George Dinham.) Mary Sophia Stanley (b. 1848, died in 1853, aged 5), John Augustus (b. 1851), Joseph Paxton (b. 1853) and James George Wood (b. 1855). (Note: There are two chronological anomalies in the sources. First, Tasmania Parks states that Mary died in 1853, aged 7, which is not compatible with an 1848 birth date. Secondly, Joseph Paxton Moir's 1933 obituary states that he died in his 84th year, whereas he would have been in his 81st year (aged 80) in September 1933 if the 1853 birthdate is correct. Other sources state that John Augustus was the eldest son, who died in his 21st year (aged 20) in January 1872, and support a July 1853 birth for Joseph Paxton.) In January 1872, John Augustus (aged 20) drowned with two others in an accident when their boat capsized on the River Huon.

== Work ==
=== Builder and Ironmonger ===
Moir began his colonial life as a builder, constructing houses and churches around Hobert, and acquiring land and property (including three blocks of land in his first four years in Hobart). He established a reputation for notable buildings such as St Mark's Anglican Church, Pontville, and was appointed to civic positions: Clerk of Public Works for the colony in 1834, then Commissioner under Hobart's 1846 Paving and Lighting Bill.

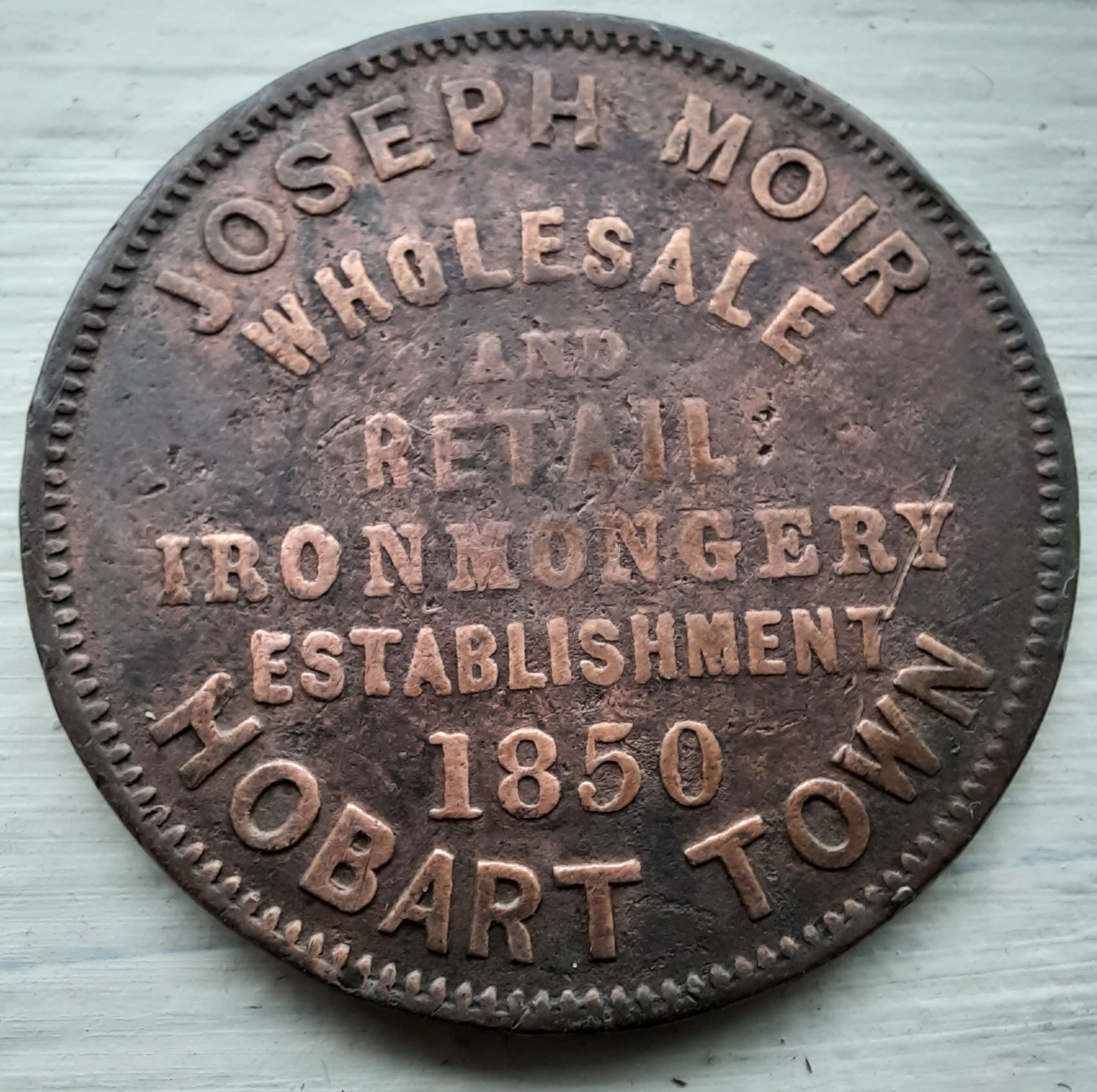
Obverse of a penny token issued by Joseph Moir.

In 1849 he visited Britain once more (Note: He departed for London on the Salsette in May 1849 and returned to Hobart on the Eliza, arriving in April 1850.) in pursuit of new business ventures, returning with textile manufacturing machines and ironmongery goods. With the latter, he soon established a successful ironmongers in Hobart at Economy House, Murray Street, advertising that he had "relinquished the business of Builder carried on by him for twenty years in Hobart" and had "arrived from England, per Eliza, with a large assortment of general Ironmongery suitable for this market, all having been selected by himself... from the principal manufacturers... of a quality hitherto unknown in the Colonies" and concluding that he could "recommend them with confidence, and at such prices as he hopes will secure the patronage of the public." Economy House was run by Moir until his death, when his son Joseph took over, finally selling the business in 1884.

=== Penny token ===
In the early 1850s, the currency shortage in the Australian colonies was so severe that dozens of tradesmen issued their own tokens. Moir's ironmongers issued a one penny token (dated 1850, when the business was established), probably around 1860. The reverse identifies Economy House as his workplace, with Murray Street spelt as Murry Street.

=== Shot Tower ===
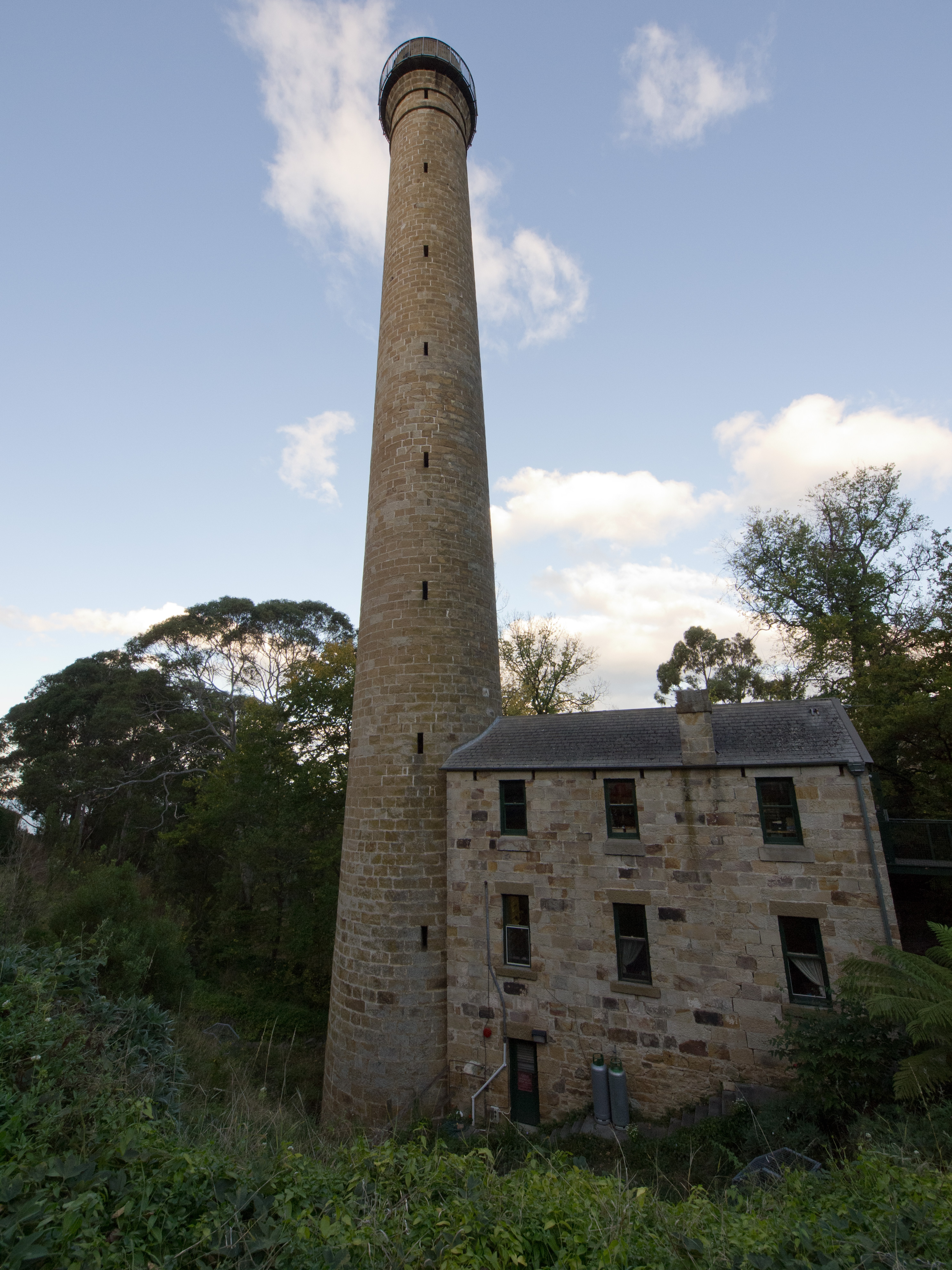
The Taroona shot tower, built by Joseph Moir in 1870

Moir moved with his family to "Queenborough Glens" in 1862, a house at Taroona, along the Browns River Road seven miles south of Hobart, built on 39 acres of land which he had purchased in 1855.

In 1870, Moir, together with two masons, constructed a shot tower at Queenborough Glens, using dressed curved sandstone blocks quarried at an abandoned Convict Probation Station nearby. The tower, 48 m (157 ft) tall and 10 m (32 ft) in diameter, was completed in July. The walls were 1 m (3 ft) thick at the bottom and under half a centimetre (1/6 in) thick at the top. The tower had an internal timber spiral staircase, and an external gallery at the top. In March 1871, Moir opened the tower to visitors.

Lead shot was produced by dropping molten lead through a colander at the top of the tower: as it fell and cooled, the lead formed into spherical droplets, which solidified when they hit a trough of water at the bottom of the tower. The production of shot suitable for contemporary muzzle loading sports guns was completed in several stages. First, after drying the shot, it was rolled down inclined glass planes to remove defective (irregularly shaped) pellets. It was then polished in a revolving cask using plumbago (graphite), which also blackened it. Finally, the shot was passed through a tower of 10 sieves which sorted it by diameter. The graded shot was packaged in hand sewn linen bags; at the height of production, 100 tons of shot were produced each year.

The shot manufacturing business was profitable while protected by a tariff of £7 per ton, but this was abolished with the Federation of Australia, after which the Tasmanian business could not compete with other Australian shot manufacturers, because of the higher cost of raw materials, and the transportation expenses between Hobart and Taroona. The business was continued by Moir's sons after his death, first by James, who won awards at the 1879 Sydney International Exhibition and the 1880–81 Melbourne Exhibition, but had to give up the business to his creditors in 1887. Joseph operated the business for a few more years, then sold it to his brother-in-law, William Baynton, who continued manufacturing until 1905, when production ceased.

The tower remains the tallest (and only circular) stone shot tower in the southern hemisphere.

=== Alderman ===
Moir served as an alderman on Hobart City Council from 1846–47 and 1871–73.

== Death and legacy ==
Moir died at Queenborough Glens on 11 March 1874, after a long illness. Hobart's Mercury newspaper suggested that Moir "never fully recovered from the shock caused by the drowning of his son" John in 1872. His widow Elizabeth died 16 months later in 1875, while his son Joseph Paxton lived until 1933 and his research on "Stone implements of the Tasmanian natives" was published by the Royal Anthropological Institute in 1900.

Summing up his career, Joseph Moir's obituary described him as "one of our most enterprising colonists ...[and] one of the most valuable and useful aldermen the city has had", adding that Moir's enterprising spirit was "illustrated in a most remarkable manner" in the shot tower he built.
