= Ironmongery =

Type of shop

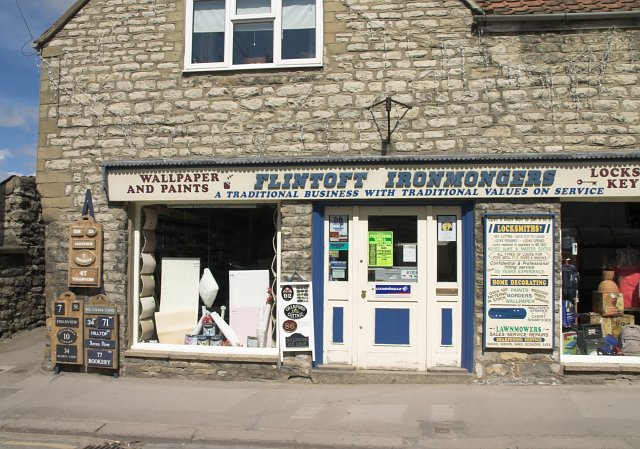
An ironmonger's shop in Pickering, North Yorkshire

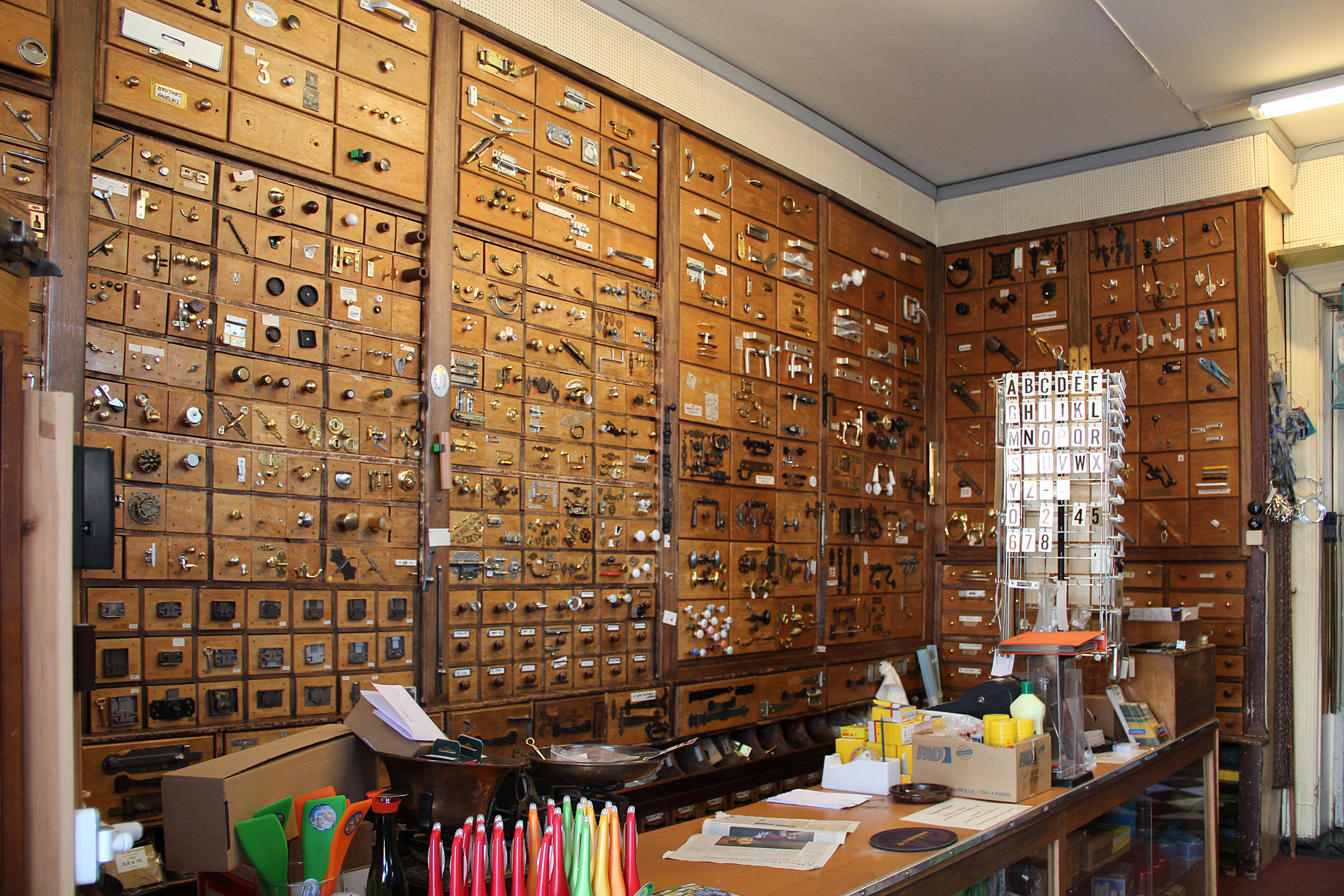
Inside a typical ironmonger's in Soignies (Belgium)

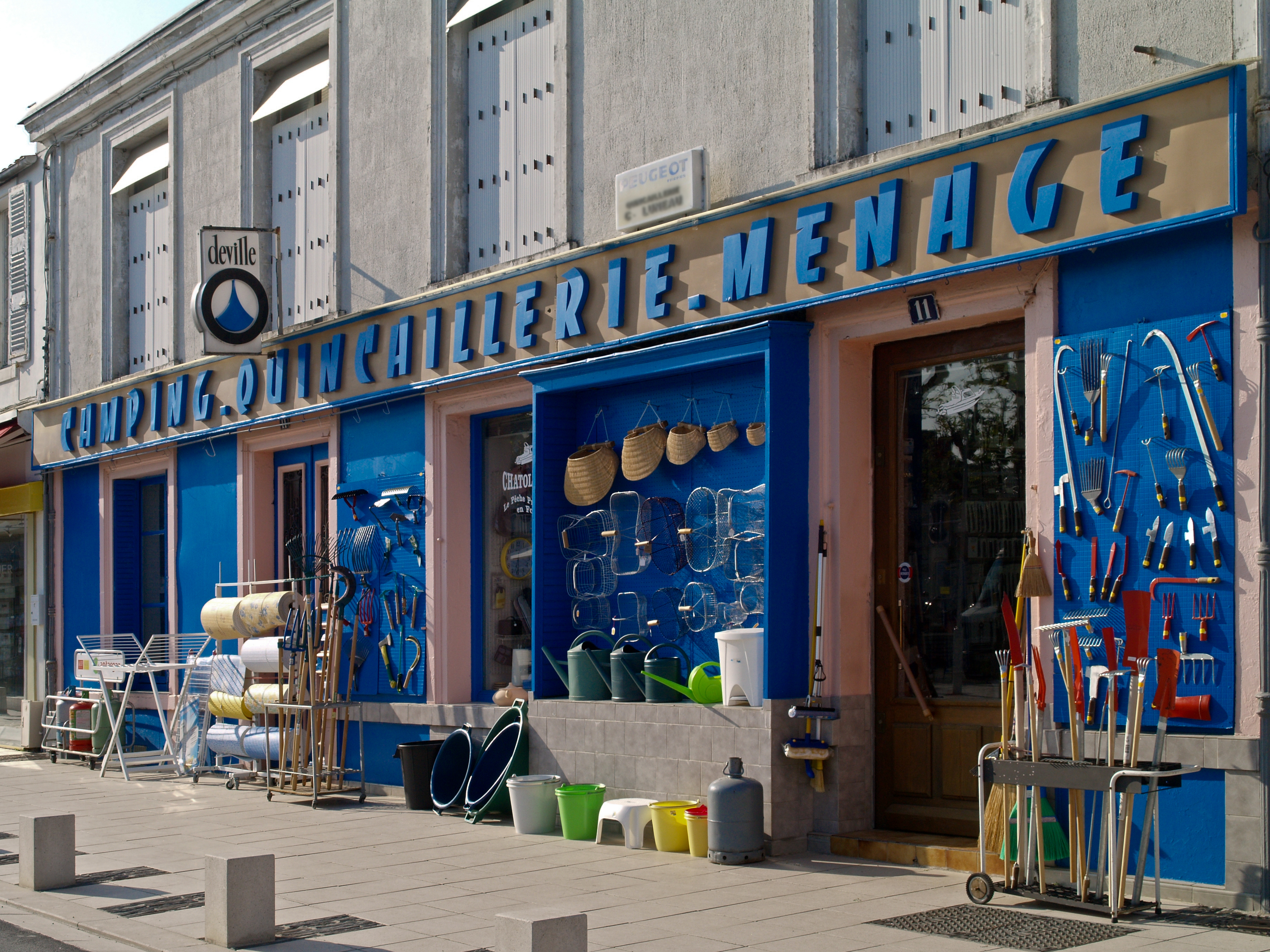
An ironmonger's shop in France, with iron goods and other consumer goods

Ironmongery originally referred, first, to the manufacture of iron goods and, second, to the place of sale of such items for domestic rather than industrial use. In both contexts, the term has expanded to include items made of steel, aluminium, brass, or other metals, as well as plastics.

The term ironmonger in reference to consumer goods stores has largely fallen out of use in Great Britain. The US equivalent of the term used in this manner would be "hardware store". Many architectural ironmongery items (for example, door handles, locks, hinges, etc.) are also manufactured for wholesale and commercial use in offices and other buildings.

== History ==
Dealing in ironware has a long tradition, dating back to the first recorded use of the metal to fashion useful objects as long ago as 1200 BC, and studying the movement of such goods around the world, often over long distances, has provided valuable insight into early societies and trading patterns.

By the Middle Ages, skilled metalworkers were highly prized for their ability to create a wide range of things, from weaponry, tools and implements to more humble domestic items, and the local blacksmith remained the principal source of ironmongery until the Industrial Revolution saw the introduction of mass production from the late 18th century. In the areas where ironware and nails were manufactured, particularly the Black Country, an ironmonger was a manufacturer operating under the domestic system, who put out iron to smiths, nailers, or other metal workers, and then organised the distribution of the finished products to retailers.

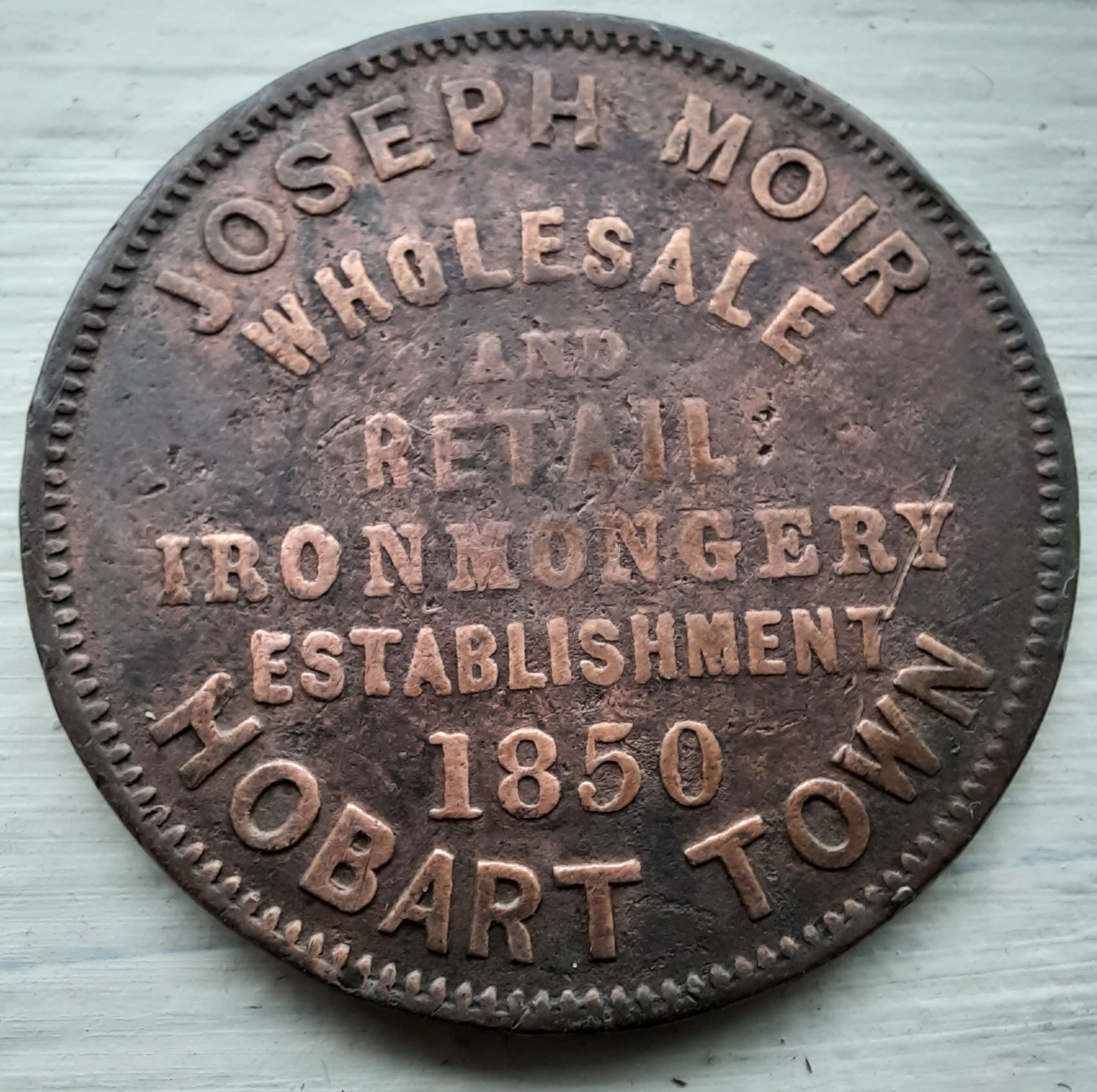
Obverse of a penny token of Joseph Moir, advertising "wholesale and retail ironmongery," 1850.

In the second half of the 19th century, Victorian ironmongery offered a treasurehouse of metalwork, with elaborate manufacturers’ catalogues offering thousands of objects to meet each and every need, almost all of which sought to combine practicality with pleasing design. In Leeds in the North of England, smiths such as Fred Verity continued to manufacture and retail ironmongery, while producing such catalogues.

The second half of the 20th century saw the steady decline of ironmongers’ shops. Although every small town in Britain used to have at least one, their fate has mirrored that of many traditional emporia. The number of ironmongers has fallen dramatically with the advent of DIY superstores that offer a complete range of ironmongery and associated products under one roof, and more recently the arrival of comprehensive mail order catalogues and internet suppliers.

However, there has been a simultaneous revival in the fortunes of old-style hand-forged ironmongery, with strong interest in the authentic restoration of period homes leading to demand for items such as traditional iron door handles, door knobs, door knockers, letter plates, locks, hinges, hooks, cabinet fittings and window furniture. There has even been renewed use of “blacksmith nails” – four-sided hand-made rosehead nails. This is typical of a trend that has seen greater appreciation of designs that have stood the test of time, that has allowed hand-forged ironmongery to find a much wider application than use in property restoration – although the practice of incorporating traditional ironmongery into contemporary housing has been helped by thoroughly modern techniques like galvanising and powder coating to inhibit rust.
