= Brussels Shot Tower =

Historic building and National Heritage Site in Brussels, Belgium

Coordinates: 50.84826°N 4.3396°E

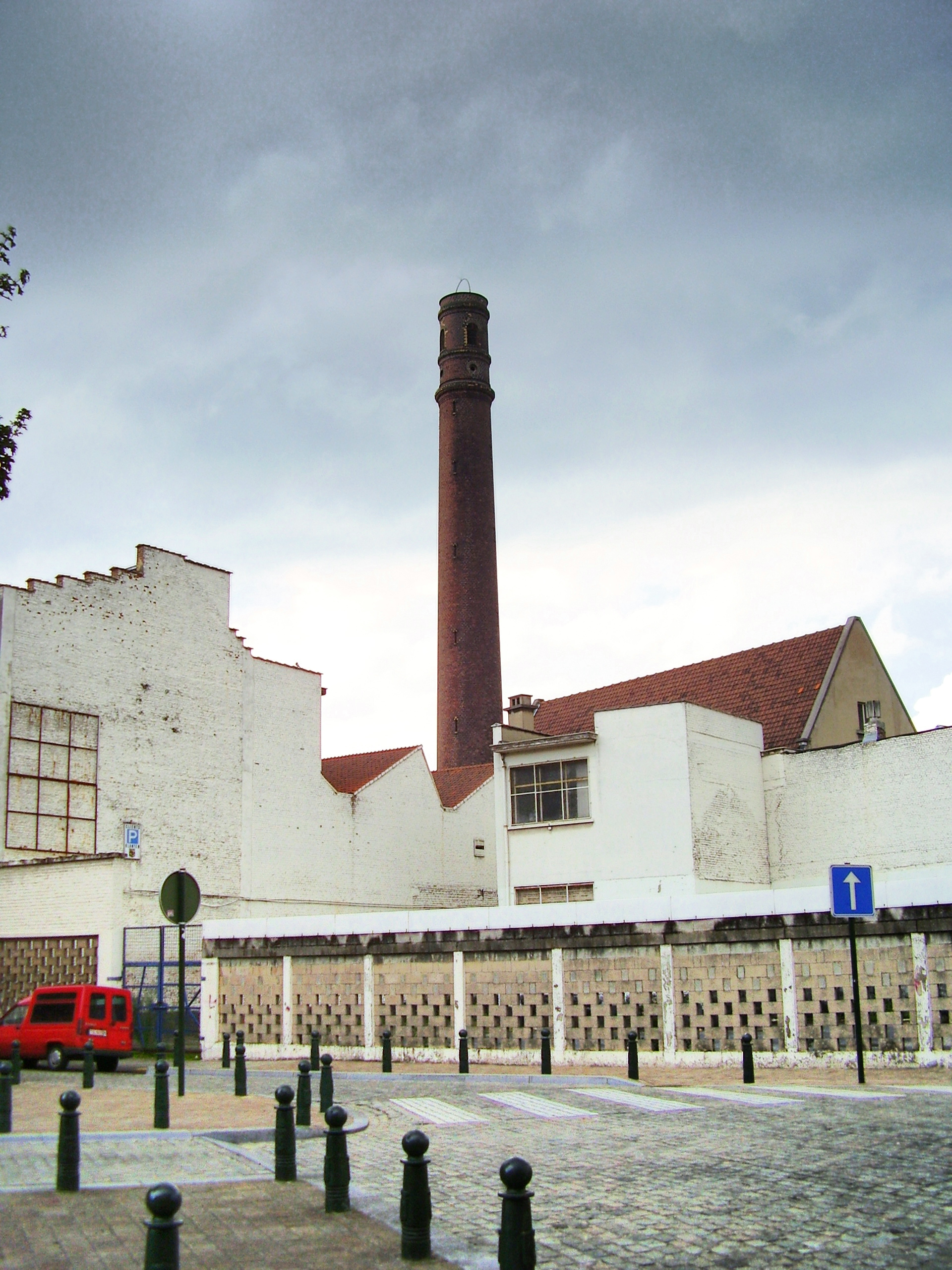
Brussels Shot Tower

The Brussels Shot Tower (French: Tour à plomb de Bruxelles; Dutch: Loodtoren van Brussel) is a former shot tower in the Senne/Zenne or Dansaert Quarter of Brussels, Belgium. It was built in 1898 at the site of a former gunpowder factory that dated back to 1832. The shot tower was used until 1962, making the last one to remain in use in Belgium. It was designated a historic site in 2001.

The round brick structure is 46 metres (151 ft) high. At its base, it is 4.7 metres (15 ft) in diameter, narrowing to 3.1 metres (10 ft) at the top. It originally had a lantern at the top, and a dome with a weathervane on it.
