= Redcliffe, Bristol =

District of Bristol, England

Coordinates: 51.4478°N 2.5895°W

Redcliffe
- Location within Bristol
- OS grid reference: ST 591 722
- Unitary authority: Bristol
- Ceremonial county: Bristol
- Region: South West
- Country: England
- Sovereign state: United Kingdom
- Post town: BRISTOL
- Postcode district: BS
- Dialling code: 0117
- Police: Avon and Somerset
- Fire: Avon
- Ambulance: South Western
- UK Parliament: Bristol Central; Bristol East

Redcliffe, also known as Redcliff, is a district of the English port city of Bristol, lying south-east of Bristol city centre. It is bounded by the loop of the Floating Harbour (including Bathurst Basin) to the west, north and east, together with the New Cut of the River Avon to the south.

Redcliffe takes its name from the red sandstone cliffs which line the southern side of the Floating Harbour, behind Phoenix Wharf and Redcliffe Wharf. These cliffs are honey-combed with tunnels, known as the Redcliffe Caves, constructed both to extract sand for the local glass making industry and to act as store houses for goods. Part of the last remaining glass kiln in the area is now the Kiln Restaurant of the Ramada Bristol City Hotel in Redcliffe Way.

The parish church of St Mary Redcliffe is one of Bristol's best known churches, with the spire at a height of 292 ft (90m) making it the second tallest building in the city. Bristol Temple Meads railway station is also located in Redcliffe.

For elections to Bristol City Council, Redcliffe is largely in the Central electoral ward, except for Temple Quay and Temple Meads, which are in Lawrence Hill ward.

== History ==
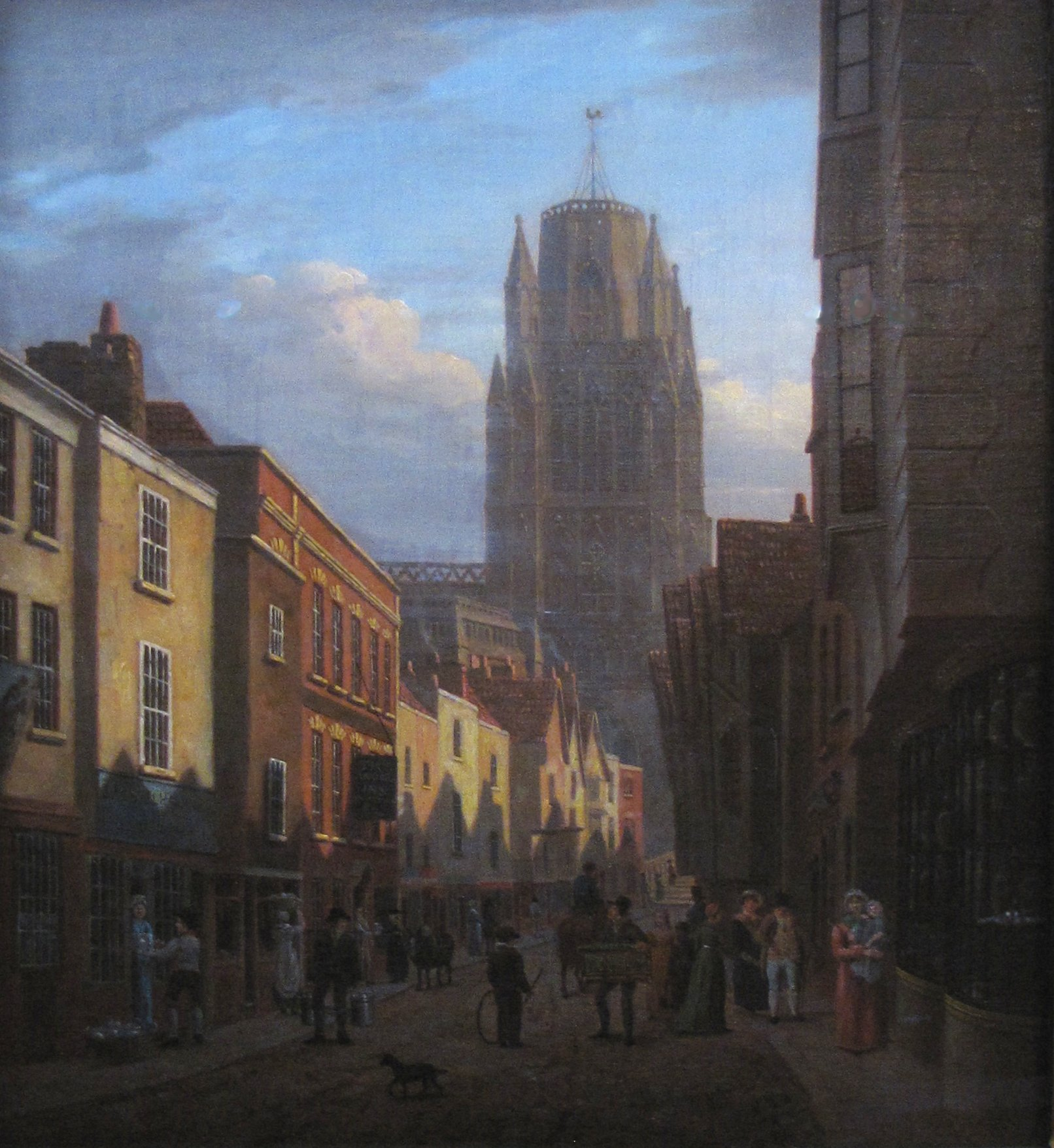
Redcliffe Street, by James Johnson, oil on canvas, c. 1825, showing the incomplete spire of St Mary Redcliffe looming above.

Redcliffe was originally part of the manor of Bedminster, held by the Earls of Gloucester, divided from Bristol by the river Avon. Relatively deep water alongside the outcrops of red sandstone upon which St Mary Redcliffe sits encouraged the development of wharves. Rivalries existed between residents and merchants of Redcliffe and those of Bristol. The only fixed crossing of the river was Bristol Bridge, although there were numerous ferries.

In the 12th century, Robert Fitzroy gave the Knights Templar part of Redcliffe, which then became known as Temple Fee. The Templars were granted the power to hold courts and execute felons. This right passed, along with the fee, to the Knights of St. John of Jerusalem after the suppression of the Templars.

Early recorded industries in Redcliffe include weaving, fulling and dyeing. It is likely that fulling and dyeing, which could be quite noxious processes, were not welcome within the town walls of Bristol and so were established here, nearby but outside the city walls.

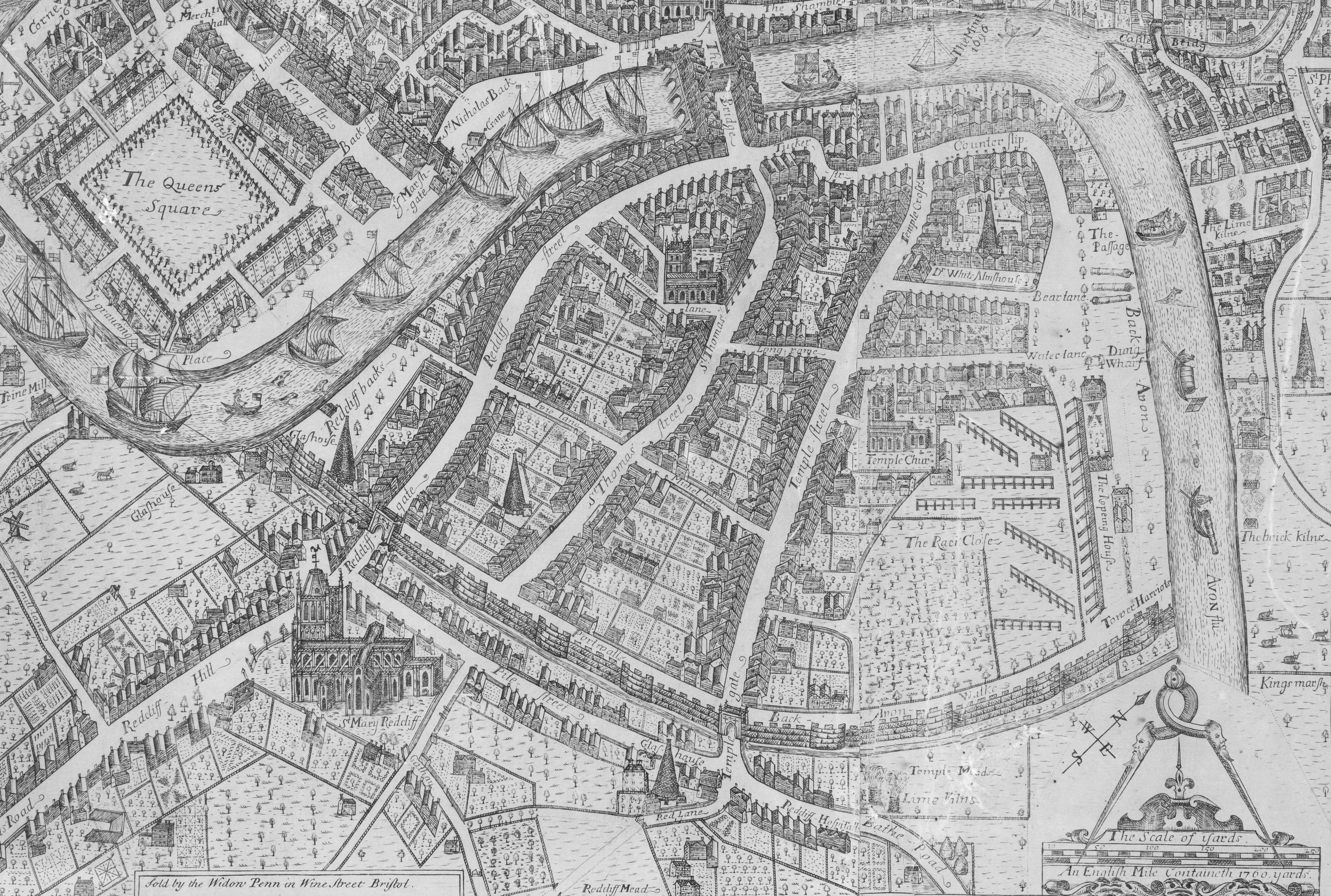
Map of Redcliffe in Bristol 1728

In the 13th century Redcliffe and Bristol underwent a rapid expansion, in King Henry III's reign due to a 'major harbour improvement' (Broad Quay or St Augustines Reach). This involved the construction of a 'Great Ditch' which formed a new course for the River Frome through St Augustine's Marsh. This provided more space for ships to moor and new quays were built. In the same period a stone bridge, Bristol Bridge, was constructed. To achieve this, the river Avon was diverted through Redcliffe, along the line of the 'Portwall' and solid stone foundations laid for the bridge, behind wattle and daub coffer dams. "The men of Redcliffe" were enjoined to help these projects by Henry III.

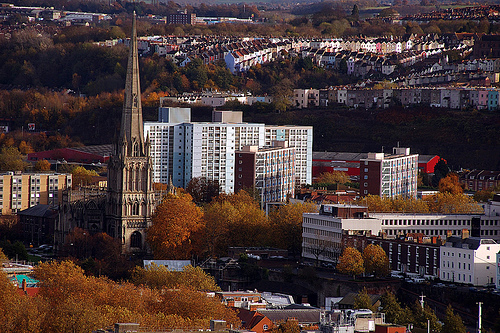
St Mary's church and surrounding modern development, seen from the Cabot Tower.

A hundred years later, in 1373, Redcliffe became part of Bristol to become the city and county of Bristol. The granting of county status was important as it meant that legal disputes no longer had to be taken to courts in Gloucester, or Ilminster in Somerset.

In 1782 William Watts converted his house, near St Mary Redcliffe, into the world's first shot tower, in order to make lead shot by his innovative tower process. The Redcliffe Shot Tower remained a well-known feature of Redcliffe until 1968, when it was demolished to make way for road improvements, and shot manufacture transferred to the Cheese Lane Shot Tower on the banks of the Floating Harbour.

== Notable residents ==
- William II Canynges - merchant

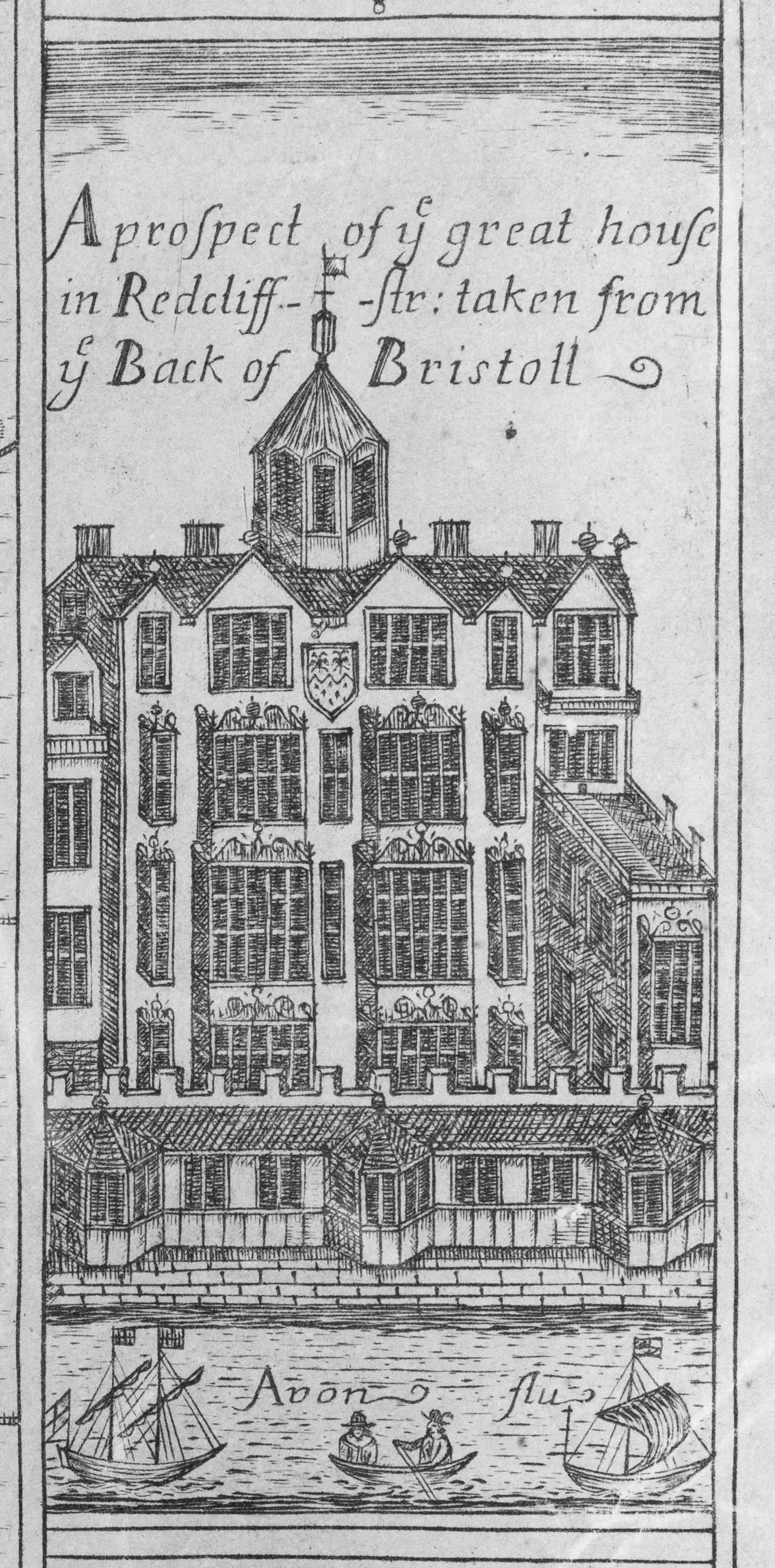
A prospect of the great house in Redcliff Str. taken from the Back of Bristoll (1728)
