= Shot Ball Tower (Berlin) =

Landmark in Berlin

Coordinates: 52°30′7″N 13°28′46″E

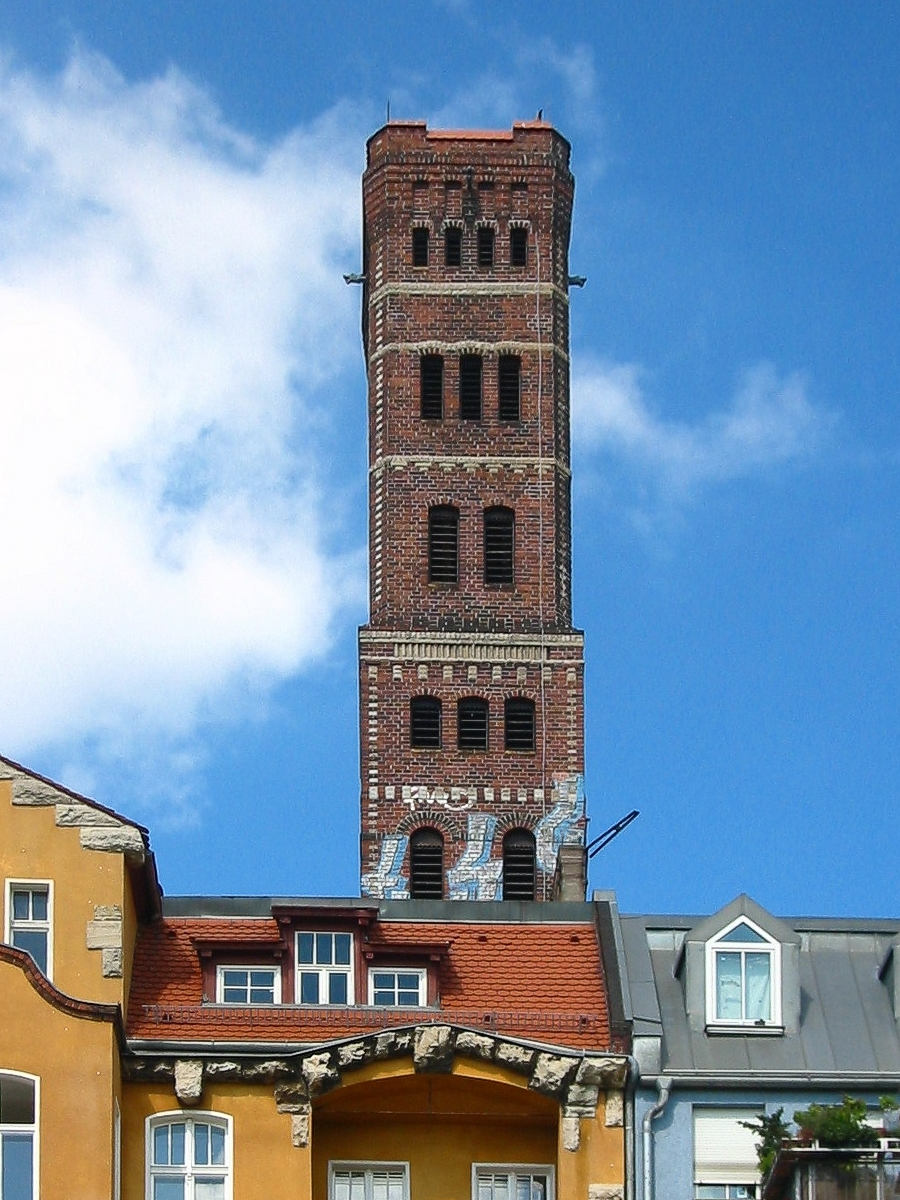
Schrotkugelturm (Shot ball tower) in 2005

The Schrotkugelturm (Lead shot tower) is the landmark of the Berlin neighbourhood Victoriastadt. The name derives from the former use as shot tower. In 1939 the production of shot balls in this tower was discontinued.

== Building ==
In 1908 the company Bleigießerei und Maschinenfabrik Juhl & Söhne (Lead Foundry and Machine Factory Juhl & Sons), since 1901 owner of the property Nöldnerstraße (formerly known as Prinz-Albert-Straße) 15 & 16, built the rectangular, 38 metre brick tower as part of the factory wing, an extension to their residential and office building. The tower protrudes out of the roof of the building by 18 metres. The platform at the top of the tower can be reached by walking 197 steps.

The design of its facade follows the medieval design of North Italian towers, e.g. in Bologna and San Gimignano.

During the days of the GDR the tower as part of a foundry belonged to the VEB Druckguß und Formbau (VEB Die Casting and Mould Making). The factory was a listed building. With the German reunification it was delisted. Since 1994 the residential building and the tower have become listed buildings once more. Due to extensive damage the tower was renovated between 1998 and 2000 at the cost of 230.000 DM. It is unique in the Berlin and Brandenburg region.

The tower can be visited during the Tag des offenen Denkmals, Germany's contribution to the European Heritage Days, on the second Sunday in September, and during guided tours by the Büro für Industriekultur.

== Process of shot making ==
At the topmost storey of the tower lead was heated until molten and then poured into a drop tube. During the free fall the lead drops became seamless spheres.

By the time they reached the water-filled basin at the bottom of the tower the balls had already solidified. Sodium sulfide and oil or tallow were added to the water preventing the oxidation of the shot balls.

The windows in the tower have never been glazed, but were fitted with wooden slats thus providing a draught in the tower which assisted the cooling of the falling shot.

== Bibliography ==
- Siegfried Zucker: Der Schrotkugelturm in Rummelsburg. In: Berlinische Monatsschrift issue 3/1994 published by Luisenstädtischer Bildungsverein, p. 66–67.
- Winfried Löschburg: Überbleibsel der Rummelsburg? – ein technisches Denkmal in der Nöldnerstraße. In: Berliner Zeitung, 20 March 1984.
- Volkmar Draeger: Herausragender Zeuge der Victoriastadt. In: Neues Deutschland, 24 October 2005 (Report about a guided tour up the Schrotkugelturm)
- Claudia Fuchs: Den Schrotkugelturm darf keiner betreten. In: Berliner Zeitung, 10 December 1998
