= Shot Tower, Taroona =

Coordinates: 42°57′29″S 147°20′15″E

Shot Tower
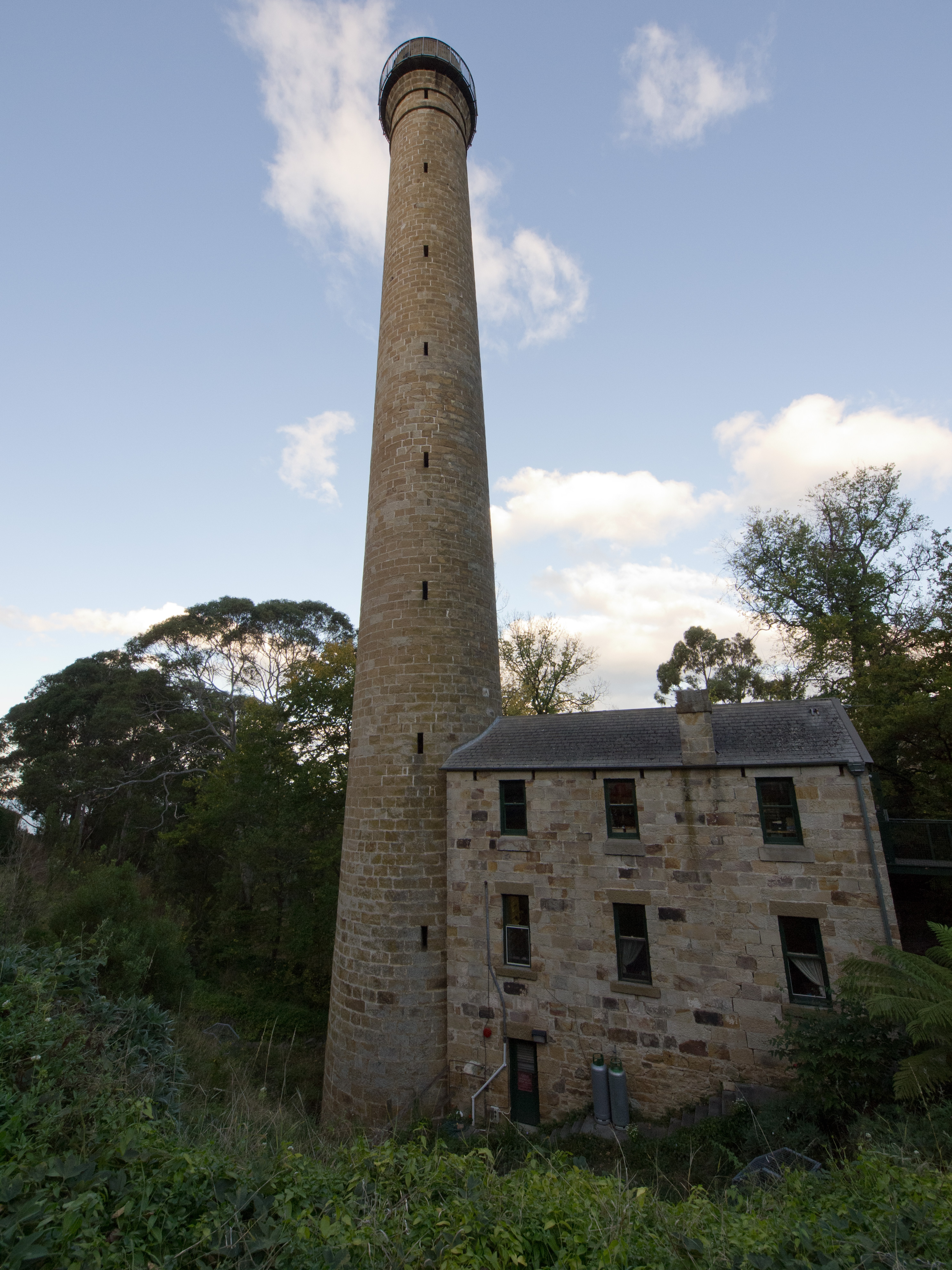
- The Shot Tower at Taroona
- Interactive map of the Shot Tower area

General information
- Type: Shot tower
- Location: Taroona, Tasmania, Australia
- Construction started: 1870
- Inaugurated: 8 September 1870
- Owner: Tasmanian Government

Height
- Height: 58.7 metres (192.6 ft)

Dimensions
- Diameter: 10–3.9 m (33–13 ft)

Technical details
- Material: Sandstone

Design and construction
- Architect: Joseph Moir
- Engineer: Joseph Moir

Tasmanian Heritage Register
- Place ID: 3,635
- Status: Permanently Registered

The Shot Tower (sometimes referred to as the Taroona Shot Tower) is a historic sandstone shot tower situated in Taroona, Tasmania, Australia. The tower held the title of tallest building within the Australian colonies between 1870 and 1875 and remained the tallest structure in Tasmania until 1960, when it was surpassed by the Mount Wellington broadcast tower. The Shot Tower is recognised as the tallest cylindrical sandstone tower in the Southern Hemisphere. The building is listed on the Tasmanian Heritage Register and was previously listed on the former Register of the National Estate.

== History ==
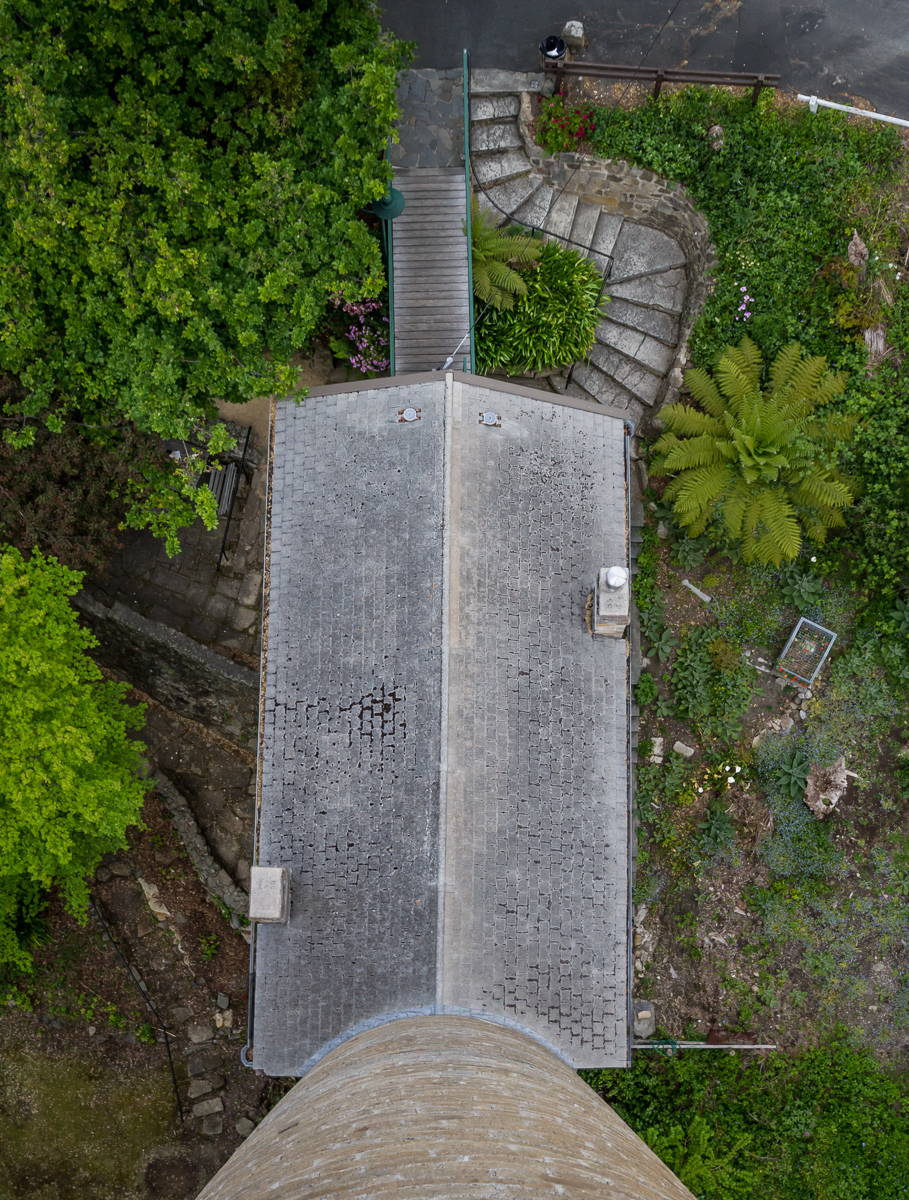
Looking down from the top of the Shot Tower

Joseph Moir, a skilled Scotsman in iron-mongering, settled in Hobart in 1829 and acquired multiple parcels of land throughout the region. Designed and built by Moir in only eight months, the Taroona Shot Tower became the tallest building in Australia when it was completed in 1870. An inscription at the tower proclaims that the first shot was dropped on 8 September 1870.

The residence of Joseph Moir and his family for many years was located at Queensborough Glen Estate, which is located on the grounds of the historic Shot Tower.

Initially protected by a tariff, the shot business faced challenges after Australia's federation in 1901, leading to the cessation of operations in 1905 under then-operator William Baynton. In an effort to adapt, Baynton's wife established a tea shop at the tower's base, marking the beginning of its use for tourism. Recognizing its significance, the Tasmanian Government designated the Shot Tower, its surrounding land, and structures as the Scenery Reserve in 1956. Today, the tower stands as a preserved historic site, open for tourism. The tea room, reminiscent of Mrs. Baynton's operation, continues to operate in the building at the tower's base.

== Operation method ==
The Taroona Shot Tower used the "long drop and water" method. Lead ingots laced with arsenic and antimony were hauled to the top of the tower, where they were melted. The liquid was then poured down the centre of the tower through a colander, which separated it into drops. Once in free-fall, these drops formed naturally into spheres. They instantly solidified upon hitting a pool of water at the bottom of the tower.

== Height ==
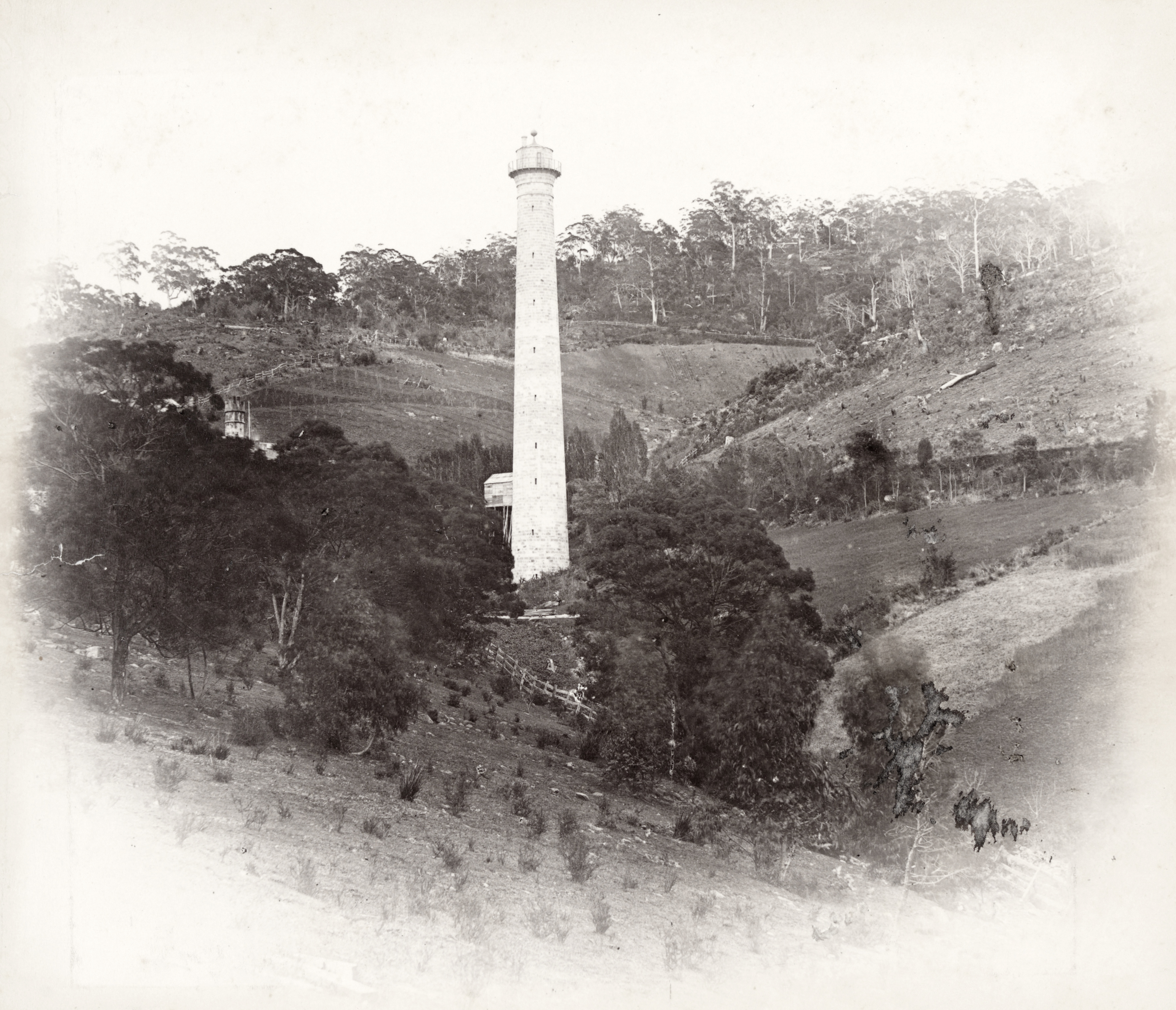
Shot-tower, Browns River Road, Tasmania, 1885-90

The tower has a height of 58.7 metres (192.6 ft) with a diameter of either 10 metres (33 ft) or 6.37 metres (20.9 ft) at the base with either 258 or 318 steps.

=== Legacy ===
The tower is one of only three remaining shot towers in modern-day Australia, with the others being located in Victoria; the Clifton Hill Shot Tower and Coop's Shot Tower located within the Melbourne Central Shopping Centre. The Shot Tower at Taroona is the only tower open to the public to climb.

The Shot Tower is the emblem for Taroona Primary School.

== Travel ==
The Shot Tower is accessible from the Hobart City Centre via car or Metro Tasmania bus along the Channel Highway.

== See also ==
- List of tallest structures built before the 20th century
