= Cheese Lane Shot Tower =

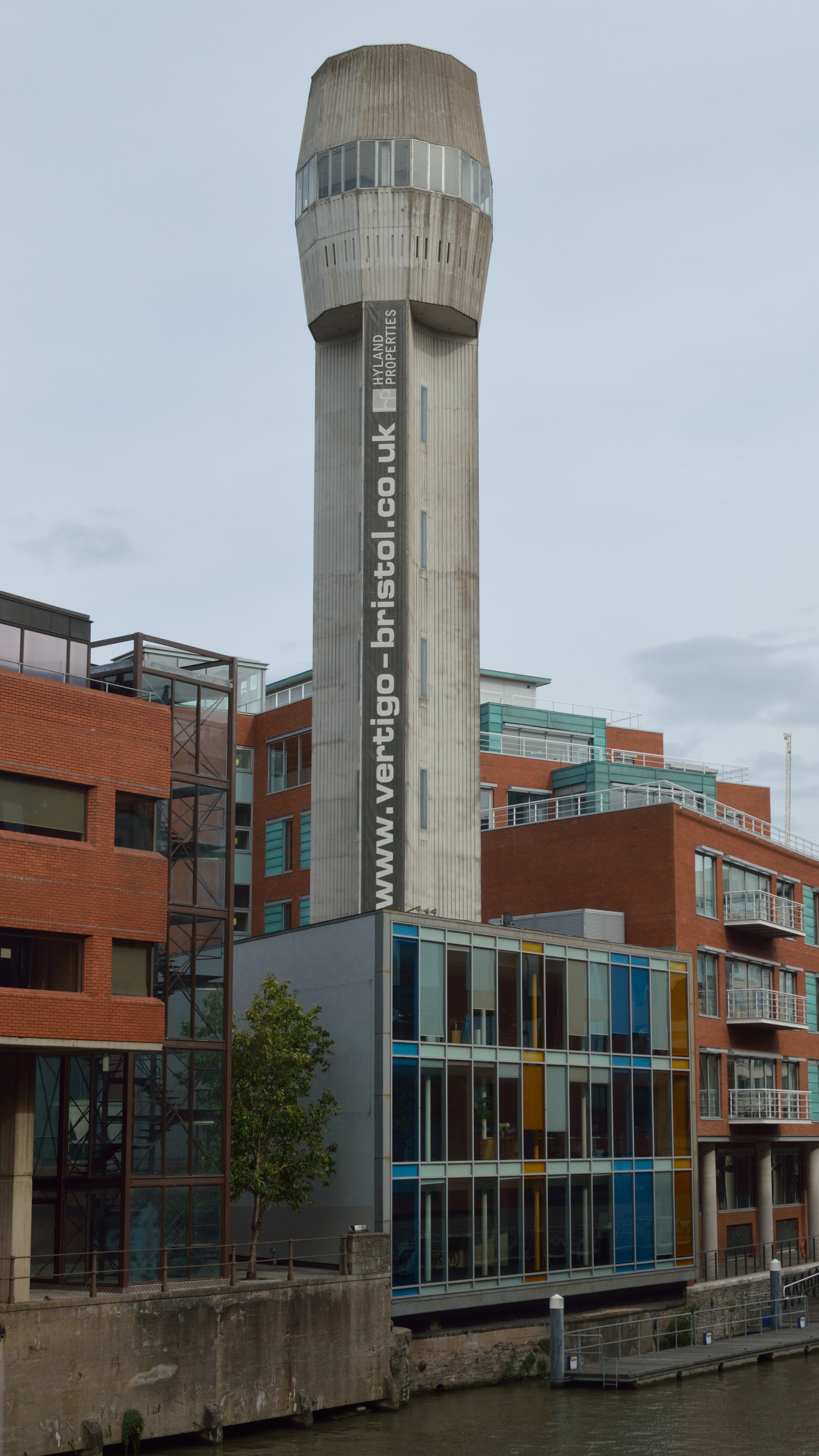
- The tower and office development
- Interactive map of the Cheese Lane Shot Tower area

General information
- Type: Shot tower
- Location: Bristol, England
- Coordinates: 51.453720°N 2.585744°W
- Completed: 1969

Height
- Height: 142 feet (43 m)

Listed Building – Grade II
- Official name: Sheldon Bush and Patent Shot Company Limited
- Designated: 24 November 1995
- Reference no.: 1059030

The Cheese Lane Shot Tower is a grade II listed shot tower in the English city of Bristol. It was built in 1969, and was a replacement for an earlier shot tower, the very first such tower ever built. It now forms part of an office development called Vertigo, and is located on the north bank of the Floating Harbour upstream of Castle Park. There is no public access to the interior of the tower.

== History ==
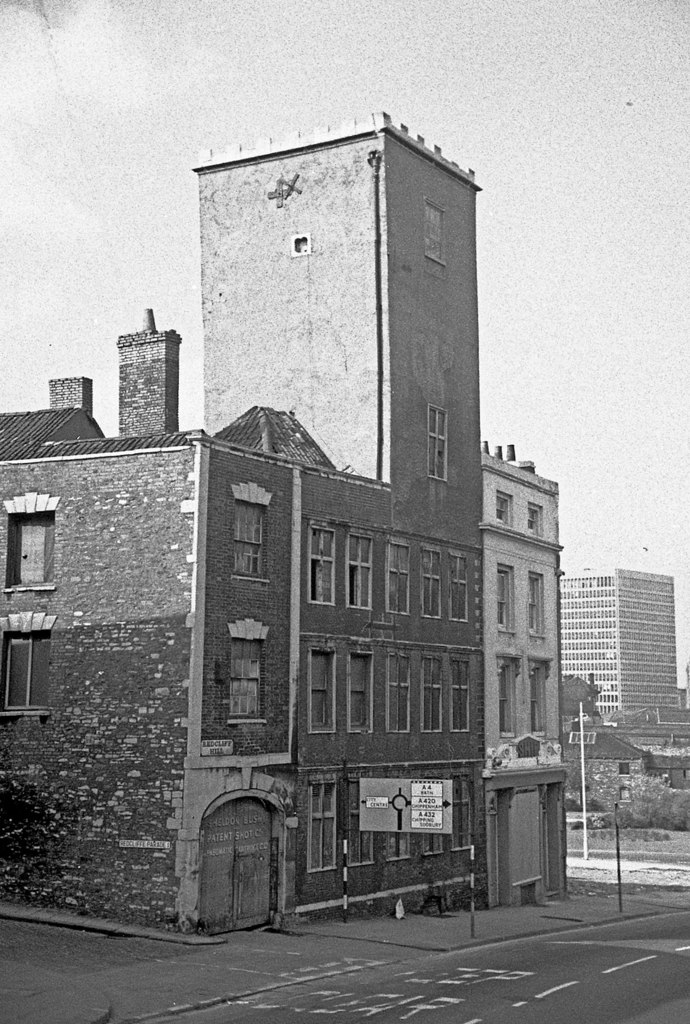
The original tower in 1966, shortly before demolition

The original tower was built in 1782, in the Bristol suburb of Redcliffe, by William Watts, who is credited with the invention of the tower process for the manufacture of lead shot. It was the progenitor of many similar towers built around the world, and survived various changes of ownership until it was taken over by the Sheldon Bush and Patent Shot Company Limited in 1868. It continued in use under their ownership until 1968, when it was demolished as part of a road widening scheme.

The current tower was designed as a replacement by E.N. Underwood and Partners, a firm of structural engineers, for the Sheldon Bush and Patent Shot Company Limited. It was constructed on a site already in use for other purposes by that company, and is some 500 yards (460 m) from the site of its predecessor. The structure is of reinforced concrete, with a twelve sided crucible room at the top, giving it an outline reminiscent of a cotton bud. It is the last such tower to be built, one of the few to be built in the 20th century, and one of only three to survive in England. It received the Civic Design Award from the Bristol Civic Society for the year 1969.

The tower is 142 feet (43 m) tall, giving a drop distance for the lead shot from the crucible room of 120 feet (37 m). The crucible room has a diameter of 24 feet (7.3 m) and originally housed a gas fired cast iron cauldron, for melting the lead ingots. A lift provided access to the crucible room for both personnel and ingots, along with an emergency staircase. The lead shot fell into a tank of cooling water at the foot of the tower, and were transferred by a conveyor belt to hoppers in the roof of the processing building.

Contemporary interior of the tower

Ledger showing the log of the final drop on 4 February 1995

Use of lead shot subsequently declined due to environmental concerns, and the Bliemeister method of shot production largely replaced the use of shot towers for the remaining production. Use of the current tower for its original purpose ceased in the late 1980s, whilst use of the site for manufacturing ceased in 1994. Demolition of the tower was originally proposed, but in 1995 it was scheduled for preservation by English Heritage, with a grade II listing. Plans were made to incorporate the tower as the centrepiece of a new office development, and this came to fruition in 2005 when the tower was incorporated in the new Vertigo office development. It has been fully refurbished, and the upper level is currently used as a board room by the owners. The current owners of the building are the not-for-profit organisation The Workforce Development Trust, incorporating Skills for Health, Skills for Justice, SFJ Awards, iCQ Awards and People 1st International.
