= Redcliffe Shot Tower =

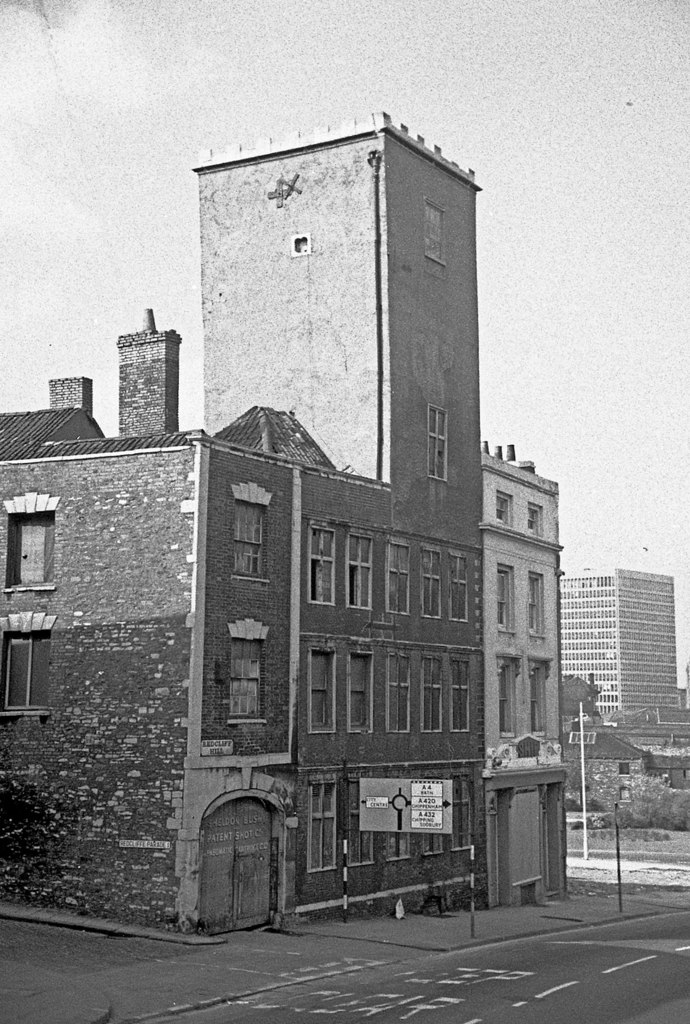
- Interactive map of the Redcliffe Shot Tower area

General information
- Type: Shot tower
- Location: Redcliffe, Bristol, England
- Coordinates: 51.448298°N 2.590599°W
- Construction started: 1775
- Completed: 1782
- Demolished: 1968

The Redcliffe Shot Tower was a historic shot tower in the English city of Bristol. It was the progenitor of many similar towers built around the world. The tower stood at the corner of Redcliffe Hill and Redcliffe Parade, in the suburb of Redcliffe, between the years of 1782 and 1968.

In 1775, William Watts, a plumber, started converting his house, near St Mary Redcliffe Church, into the world's first shot tower, in order to make lead shot by his innovative tower process. He did this by adding a tower atop his house, and by excavating a shaft into the soft sandstone below, achieving a total drop of around 90 feet (27 m). By 1782, the tower was complete and in production, and Watts was granted a patent on his process, which involved pouring molten lead through a perforated zinc pan into water below.

William Watts was declared bankrupt in 1794, but his tower survived various changes of ownership until it was taken over by the Sheldon Bush and Patent Shot Company Limited in 1868. The tower remained a well-known feature of Redcliffe until 1968, when it was demolished to make way for road improvements. The Sheldon Bush and Patent Shot Company's shot manufacture was transferred to the new Cheese Lane Shot Tower on the banks of the Floating Harbour.
