= Shot tower =

Tower used for the production of lead balls

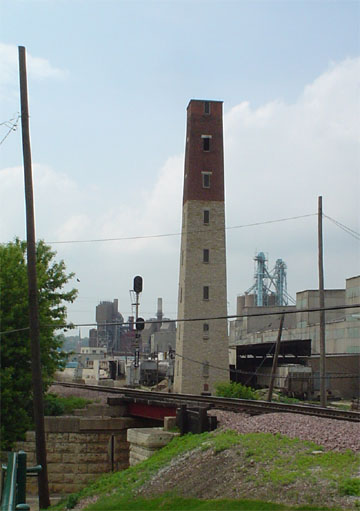
The shot tower in Dubuque, Iowa

A shot tower is a tower designed for the production of small-diameter shot balls by free fall of molten lead, which is then caught in a water basin. The shot is mainly used for projectiles in shotguns, and for ballast, radiation shielding, and other applications for which small lead balls are useful.

== Shot making ==
=== Process ===
How a shot tower works

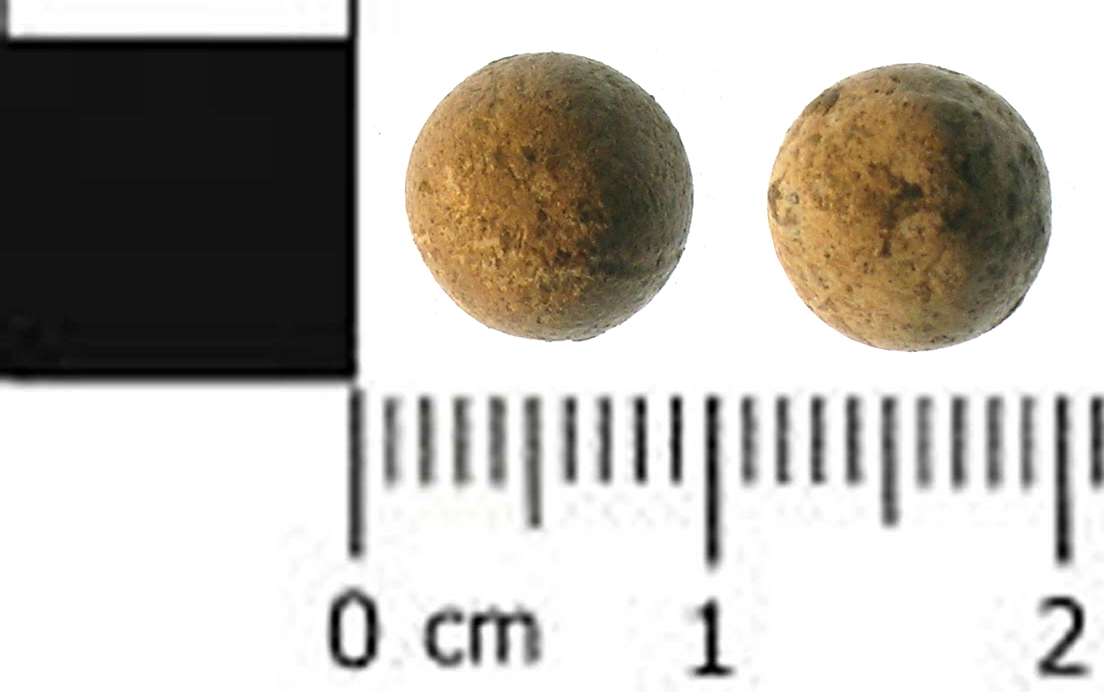
Lead-alloy musket ball thought from its lack of casting marks to have been made in a shot tower

In a shot tower, lead is heated until molten, then dropped through a copper sieve high in the tower. The liquid lead forms tiny spherical balls by surface tension, and solidifies as it falls. The partially cooled balls are caught at the floor of the tower in a water-filled basin. The now fully cooled balls are checked for roundness and sorted by size; those that are "out of round" are remelted. A slightly inclined table is used for checking roundness. To make larger shot sizes, a copper sieve with bigger holes is used.

The maximum size is limited by the height of the tower, because larger shot sizes must fall further to solidify. A shot tower with a 40-meter drop can produce up to #6 shot (nominally 2.4mm in diameter) while an 80-meter drop can produce #2 shot (nominally 3.8mm in diameter). Polishing with a small amount of graphite is necessary for lubrication and to prevent oxidation.

=== History ===
The process was invented by William Watts of Bristol, England, and patented in 1782. The same year, Watts extended his house in Redcliffe to build the first shot tower. Use of shot towers replaced earlier techniques of casting shot in moulds, which was expensive, or of dripping molten lead into water barrels, that produced insufficiently spherical balls. Large shot which could not be made by the shot tower was made by tumbling pieces of cut lead sheet in a barrel until round.

The "wind tower" method, which used a blast of cold air to dramatically shorten the drop necessary and was patented in 1848 by the T.O LeRoy Company of New York City, meant that tall shot towers became unnecessary, but many were still constructed into the late 1880s, and two surviving examples date from 1916 and 1969. Since the 1960s, the Bliemeister method has been used to make smaller shot sizes, and larger sizes are made by the cold swaging process of feeding calibrated lengths of wire into hemispherical dies and stamping them into spheres.

== Gallery ==
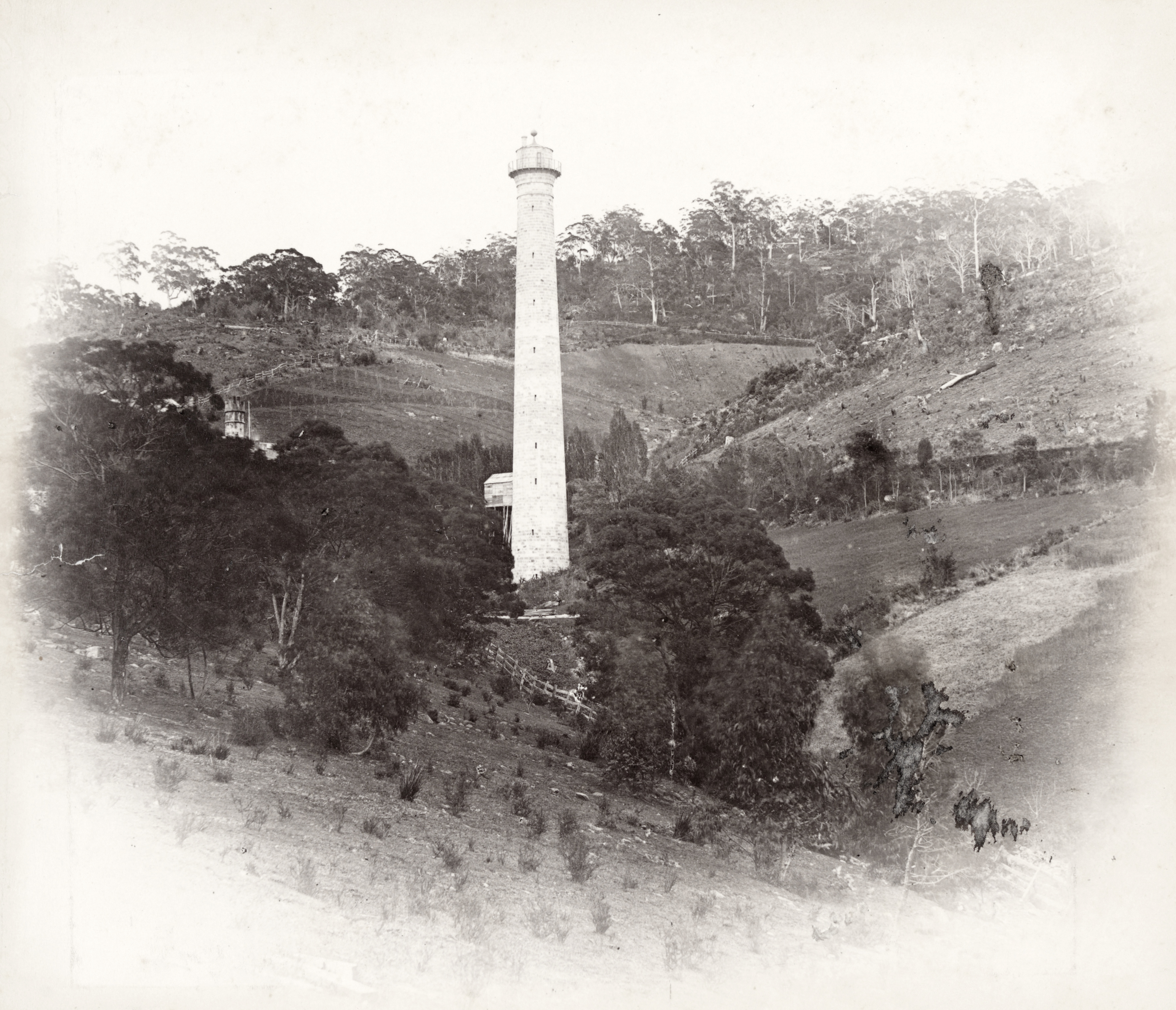
Shot-tower, Browns River Road, Tasmania, 1885–1890

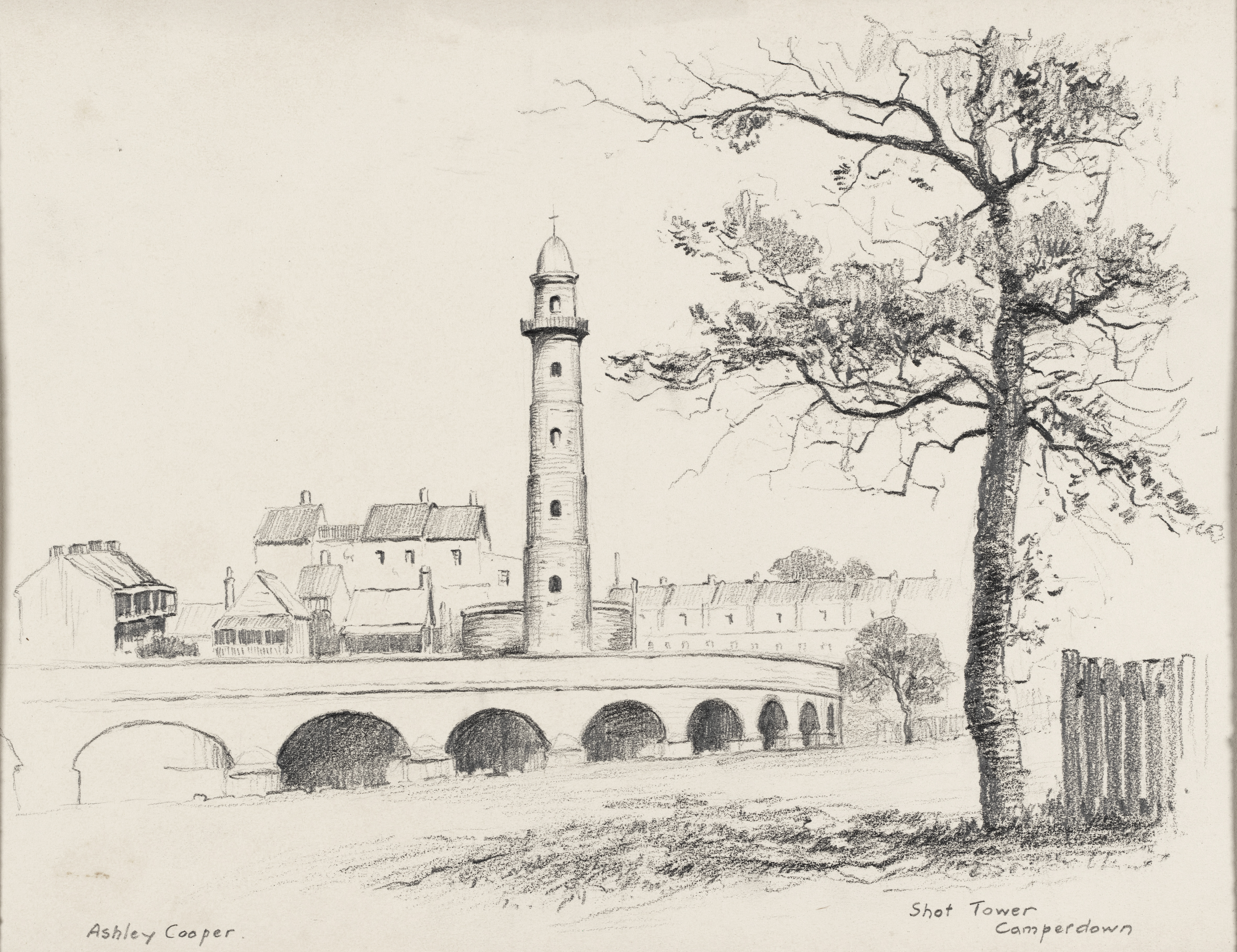
Shot Tower, Wentworth Park, Sydney, by Ashley Cooper, c. 1920

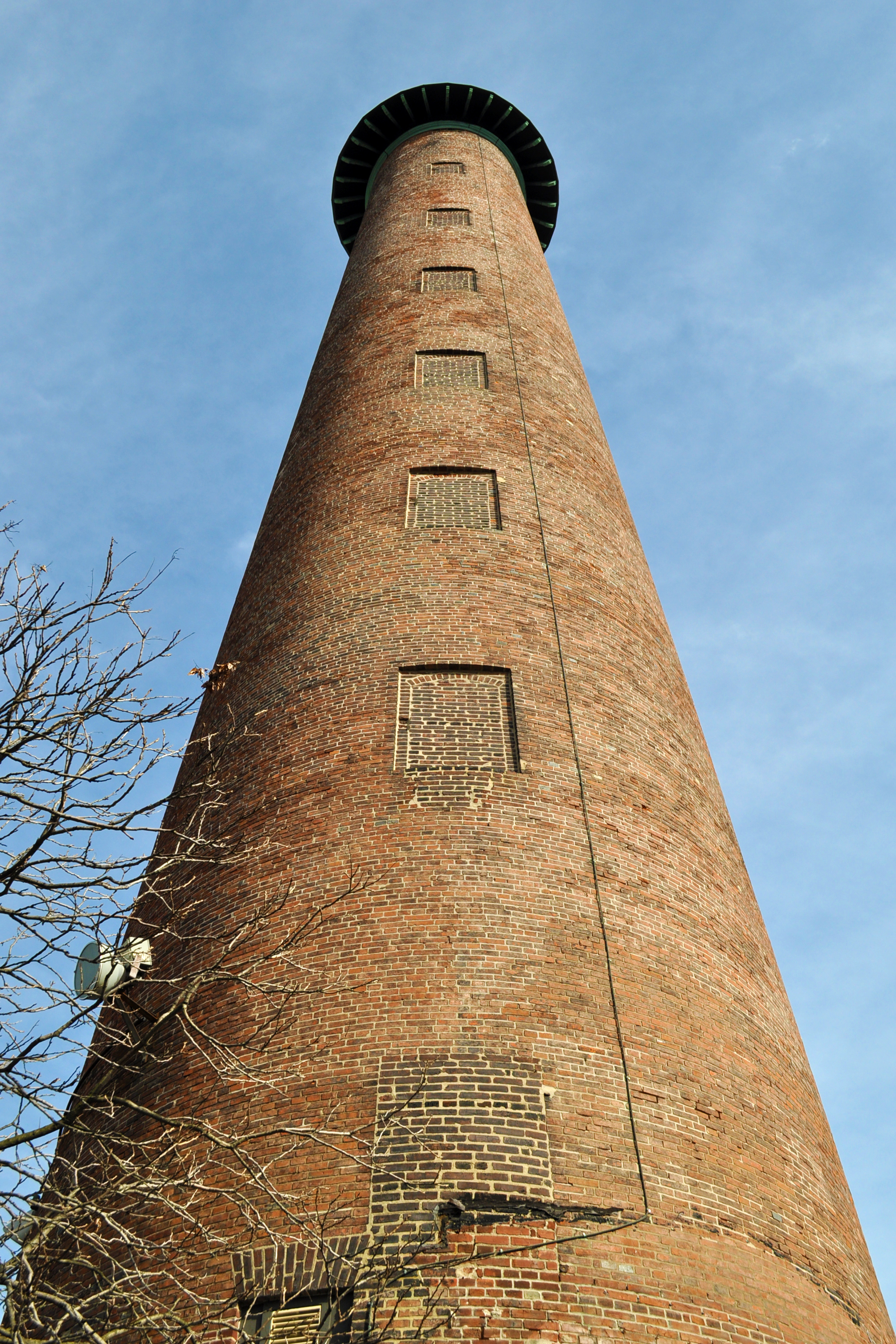
Sparks Shot Tower, Philadelphia, US (1808)

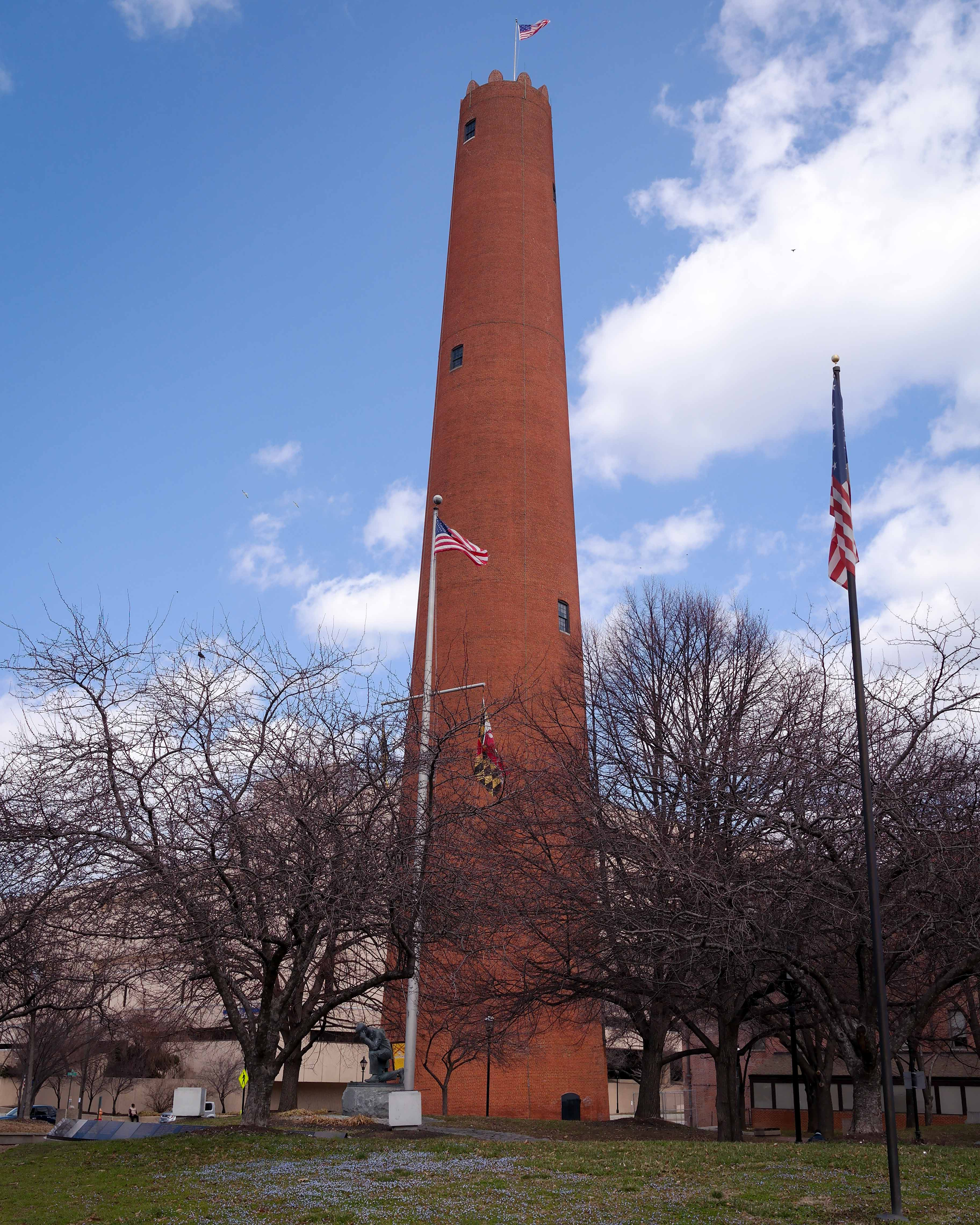
Phoenix Shot Tower, Baltimore, US (1828)

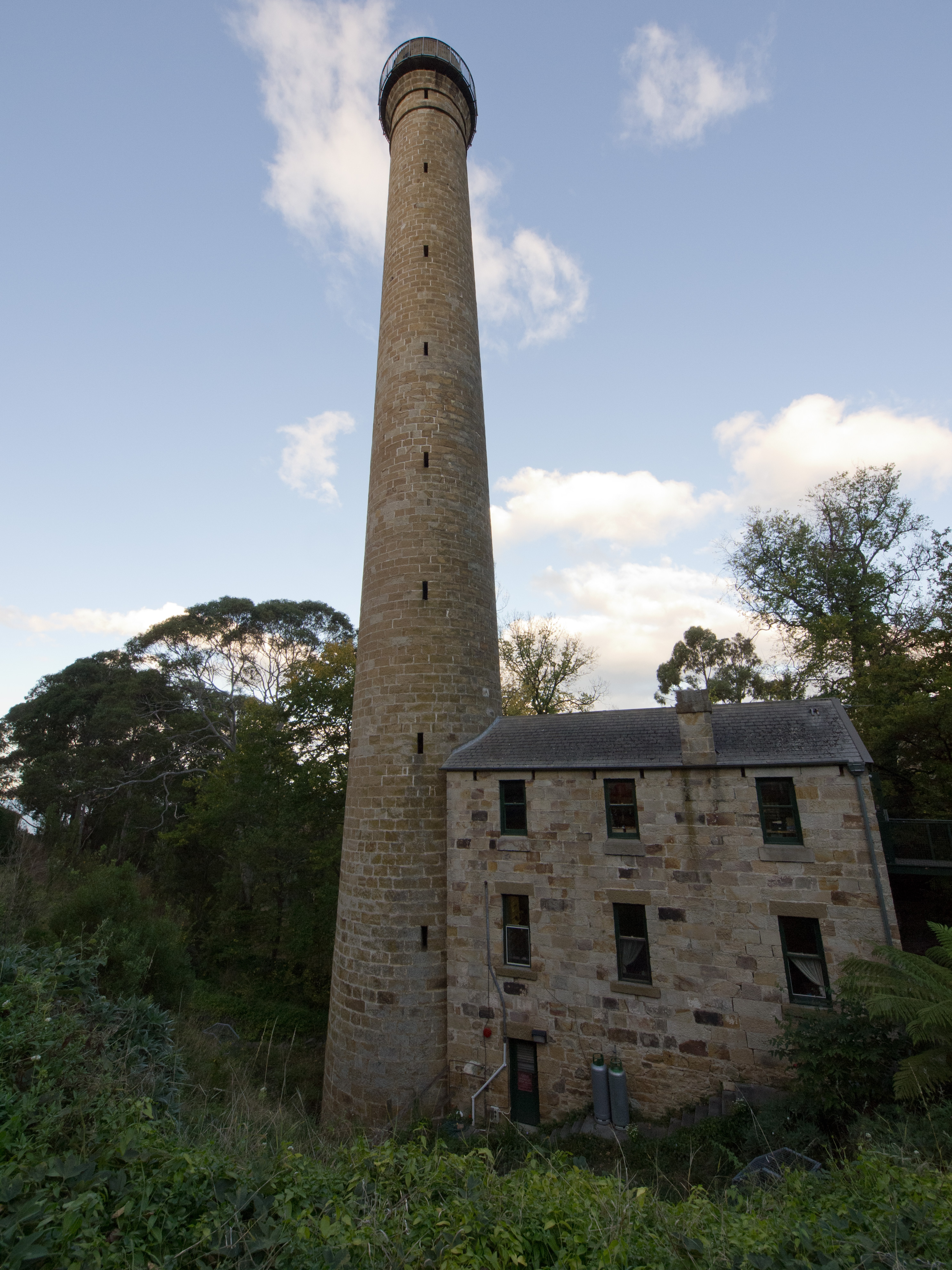
Shot Tower, Taroona, Tasmania, Australia

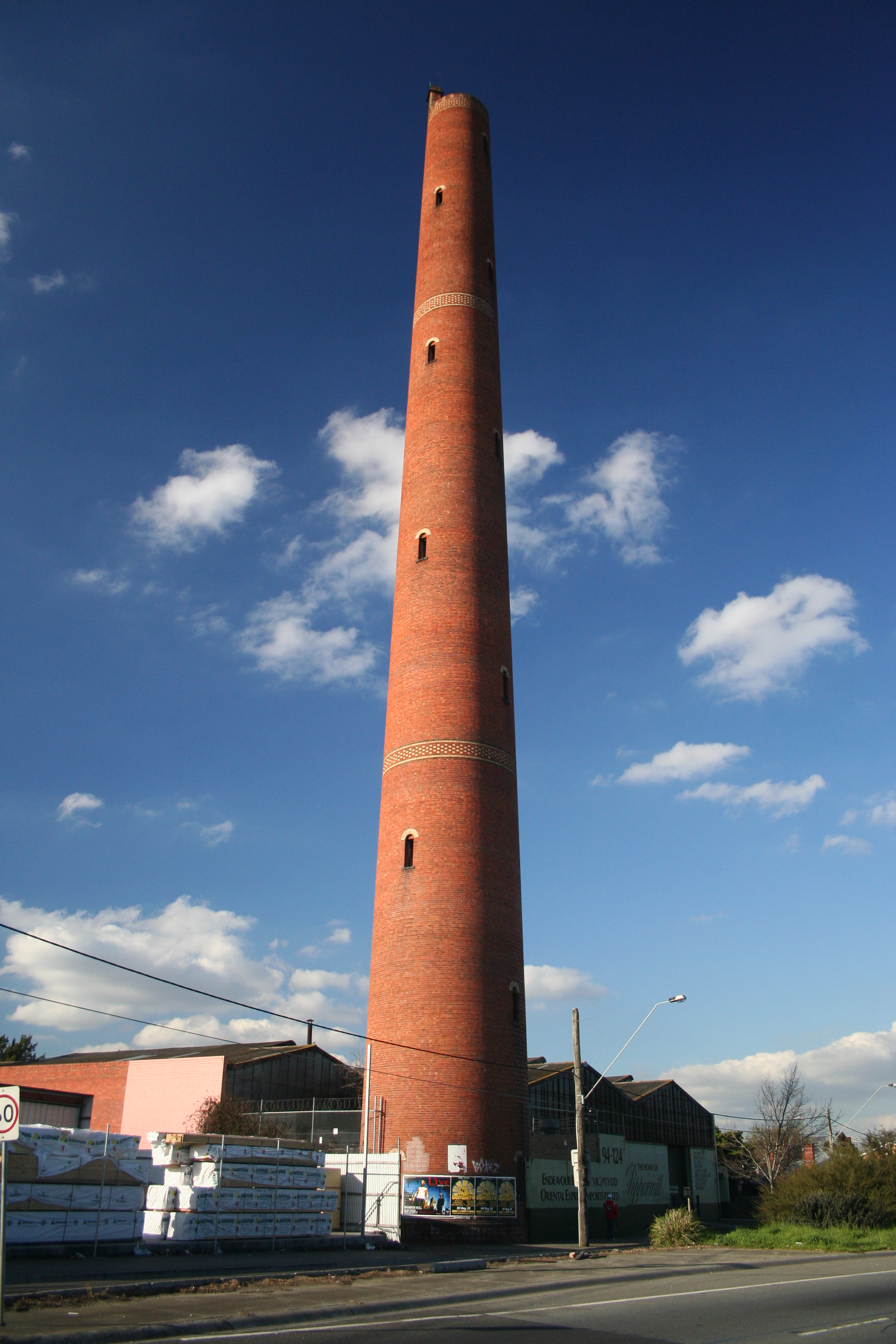
Clifton Hill Shot Tower, Melbourne, Australia (1882)

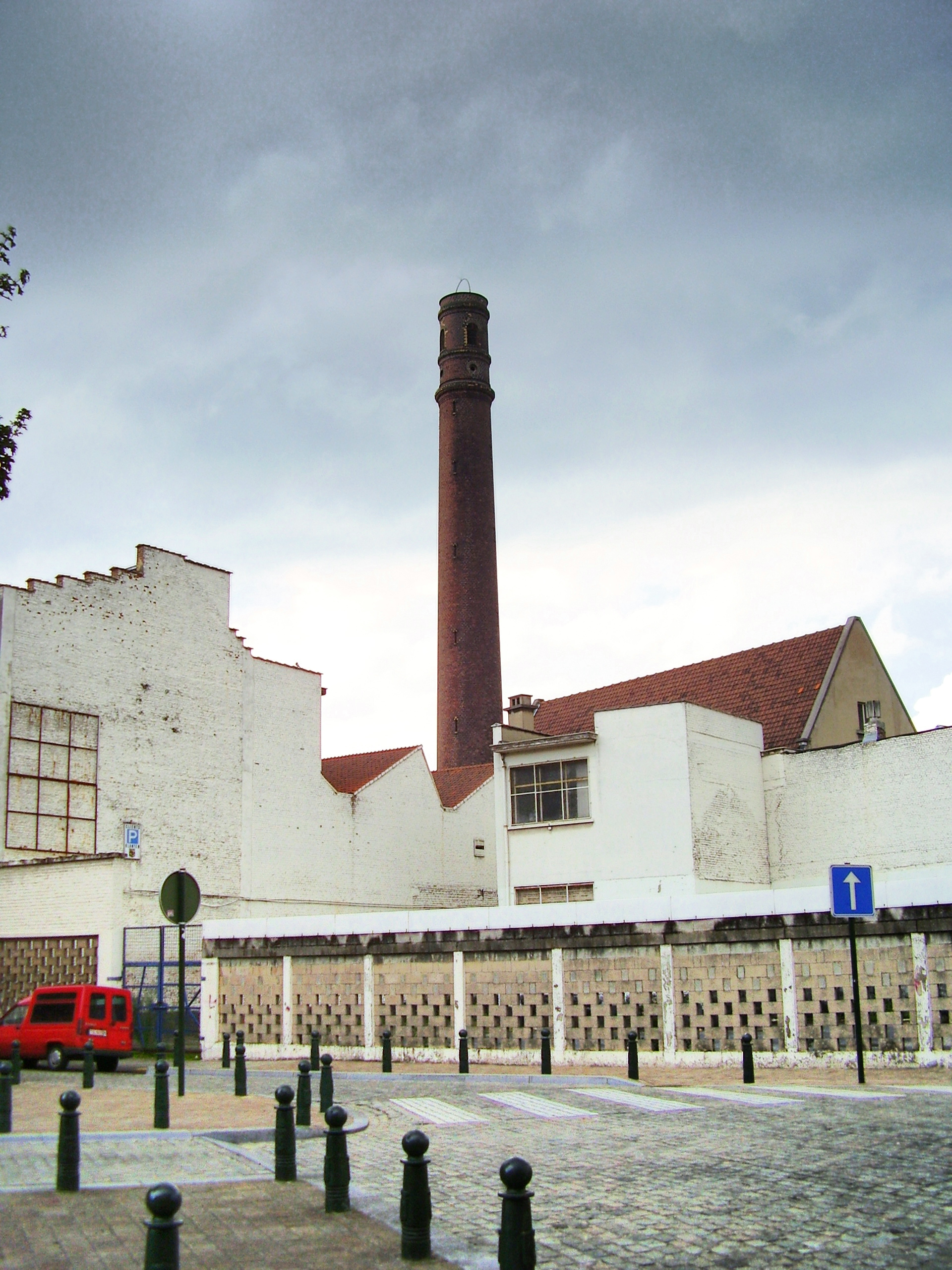
Brussels Shot Tower, Belgium (1898)

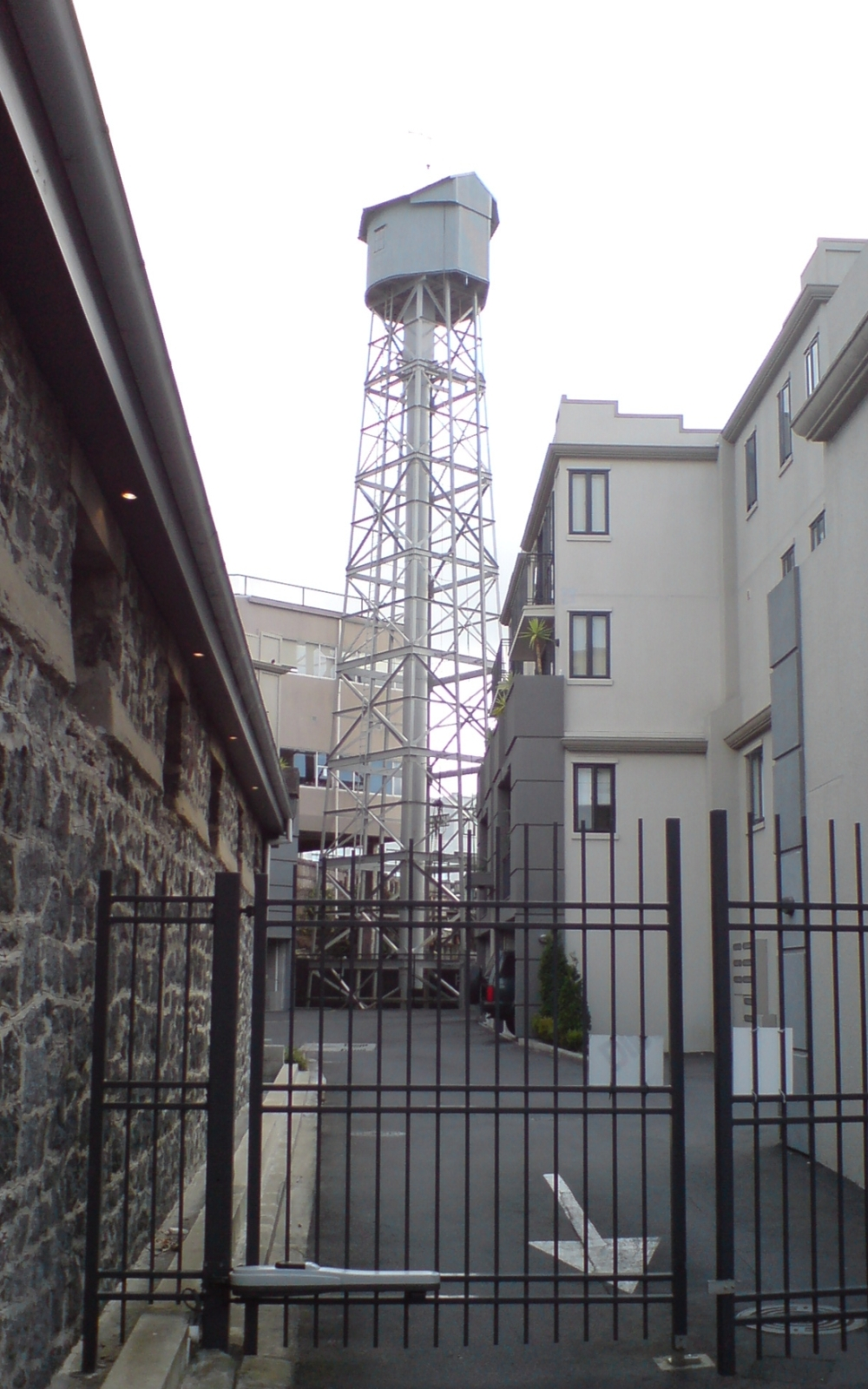
Colonial Ammunition Company, Auckland, New Zealand (1914)

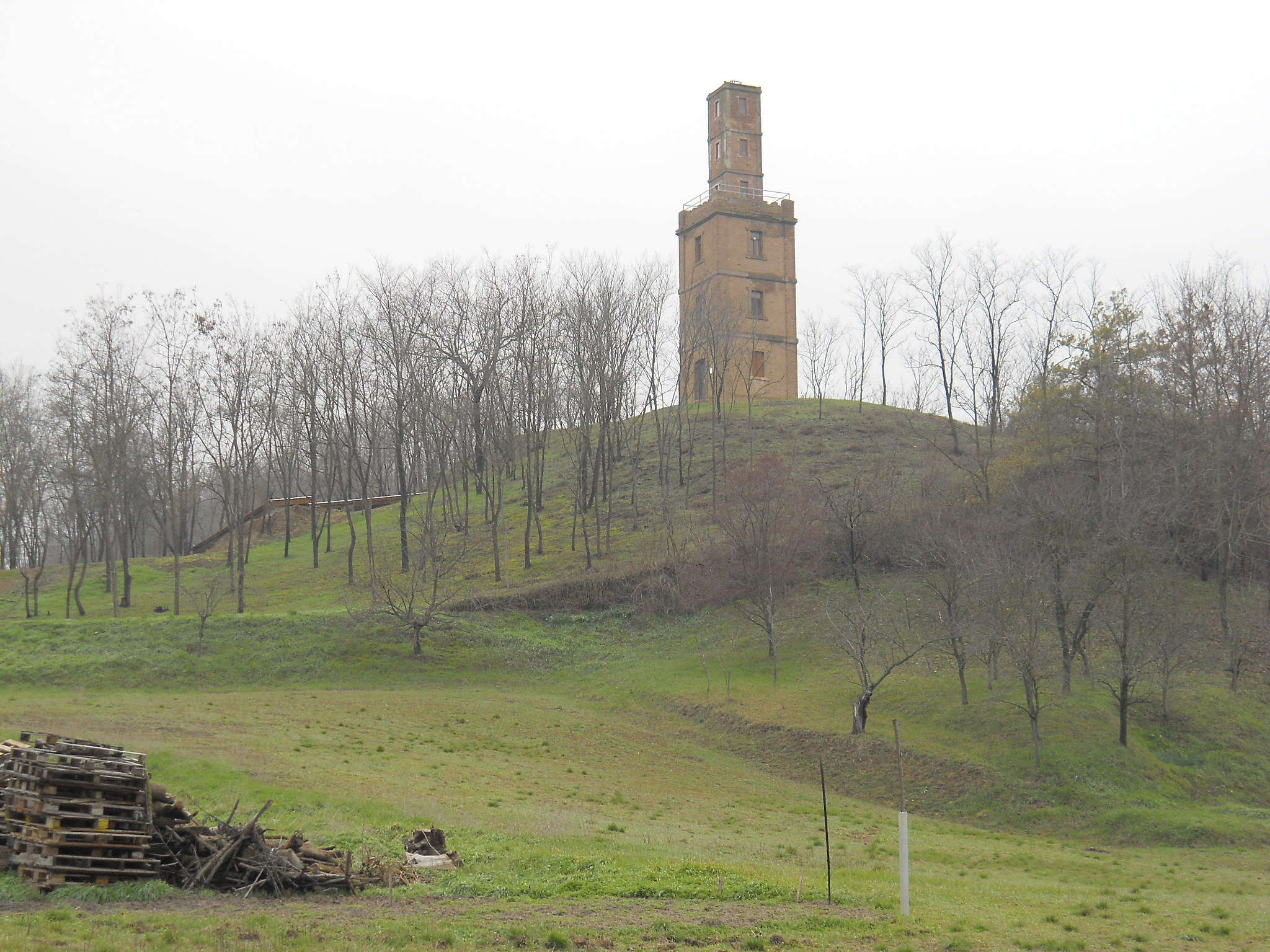
Bojárd, Hungary (1936–1938)

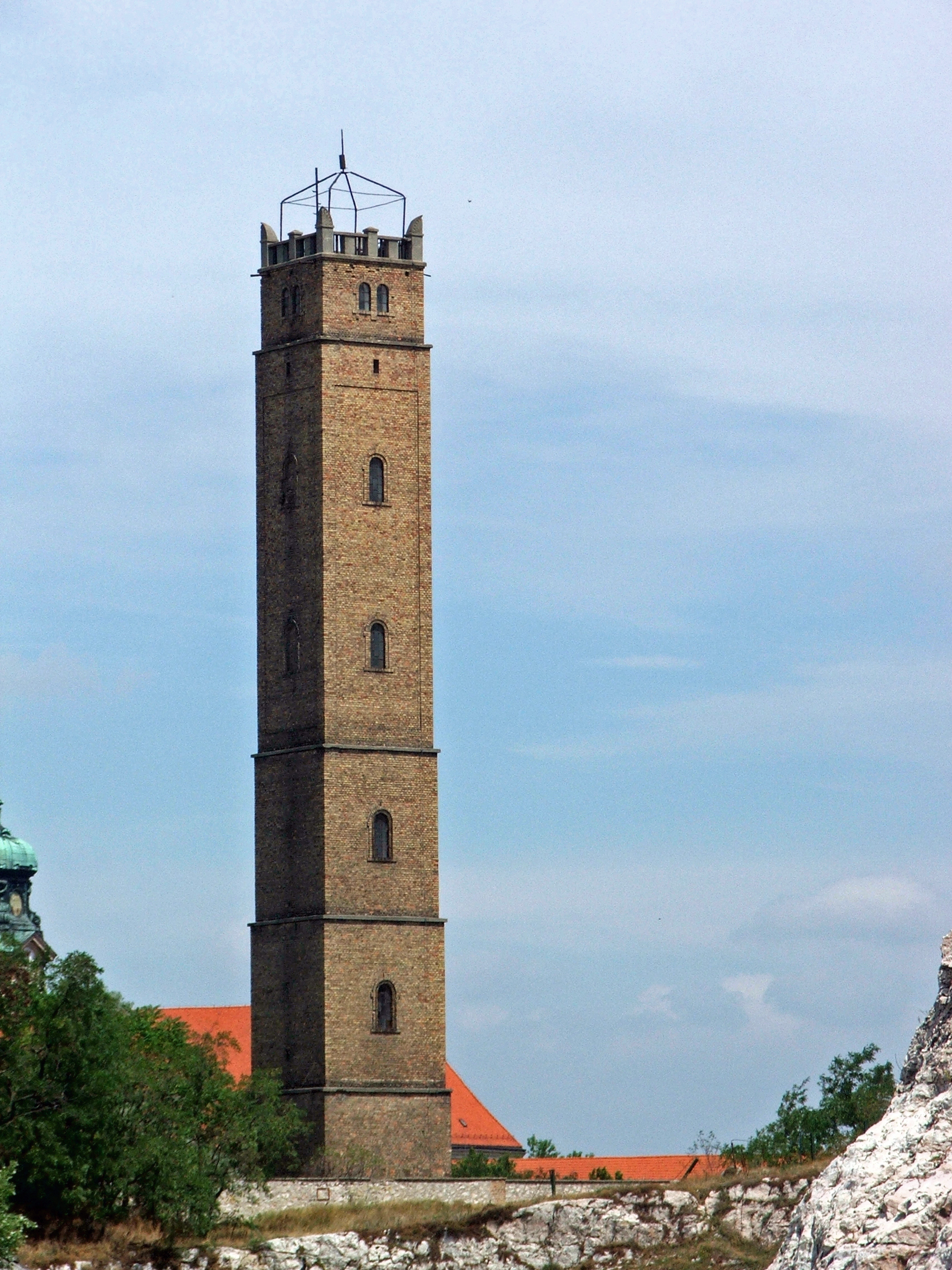
Tata, Hungary (1939)

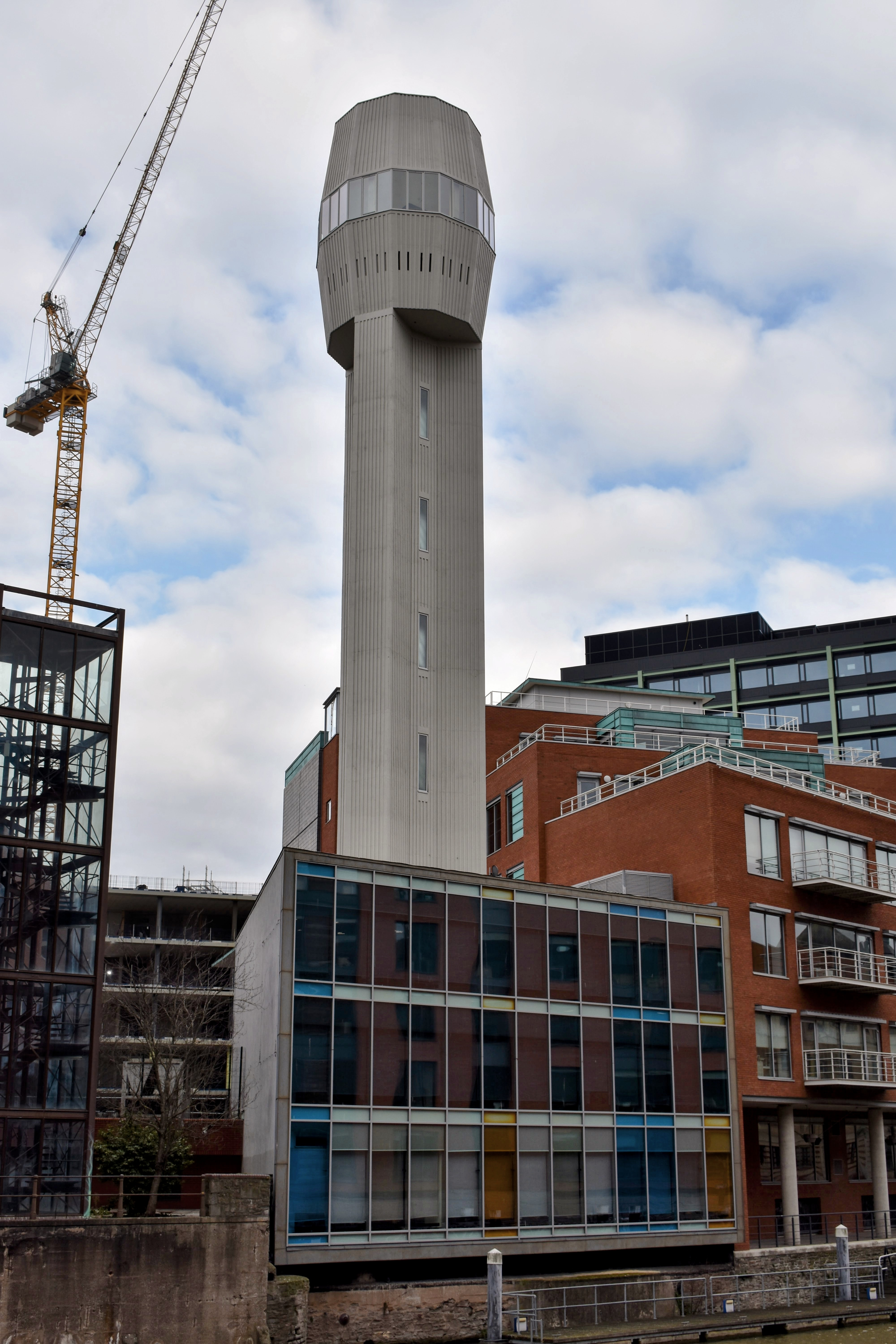
Cheese Lane Shot Tower, Bristol, England

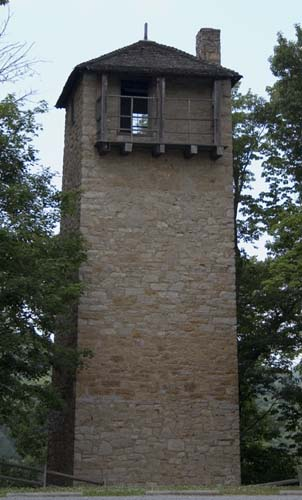
Jackson Ferry Shot Tower in Wythe County, Virginia, US

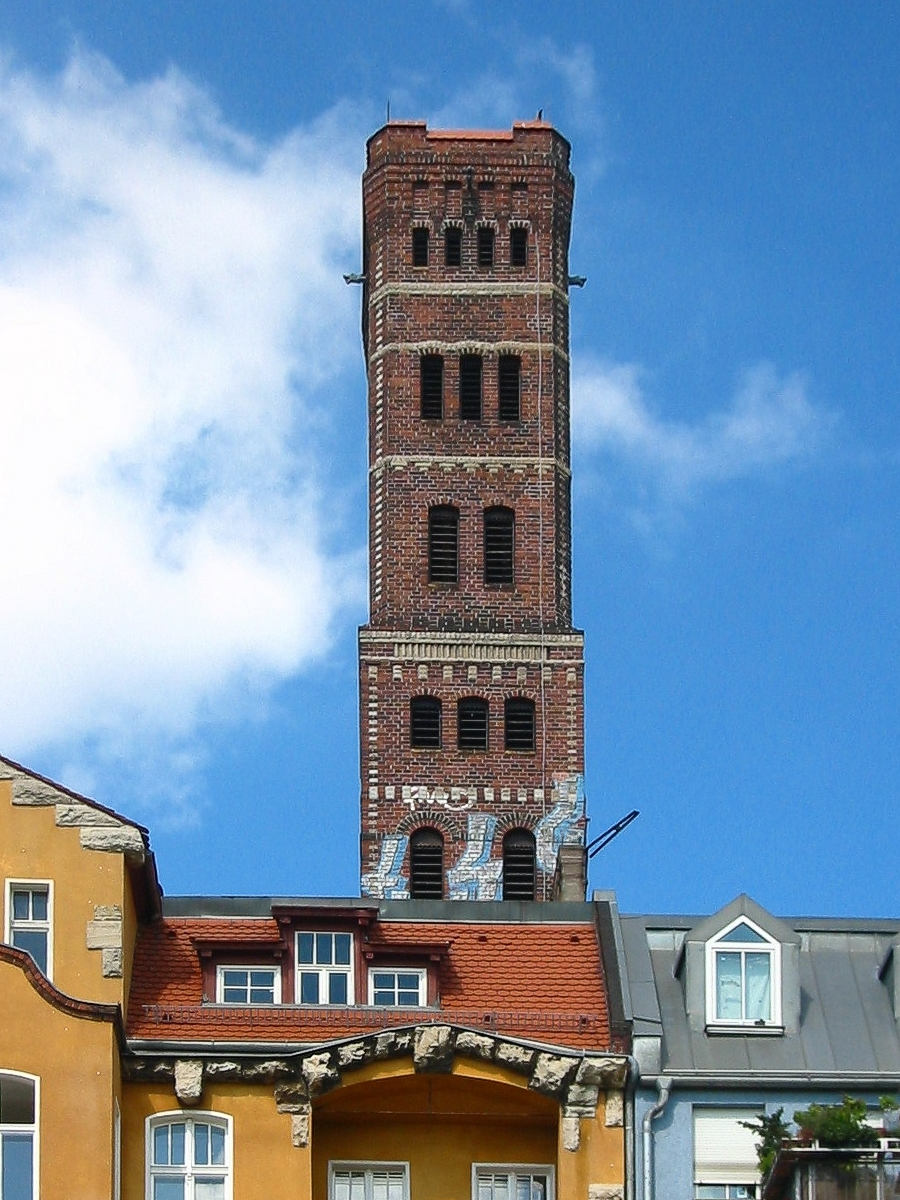
Shot Ball Tower in Berlin, Germany

== See also ==
- Drop tube, a similar concept, but used for scientific experiments
- Prill, a small granule of material formed by a similar process to shot-making. Often used in the chemical industry for solid chemicals.
- Spray drying is a process of turning liquids into powder; many spray dryers also have the drops of liquid solidifying as they fall in a tower.
