= List of demolished buildings and structures in Melbourne =

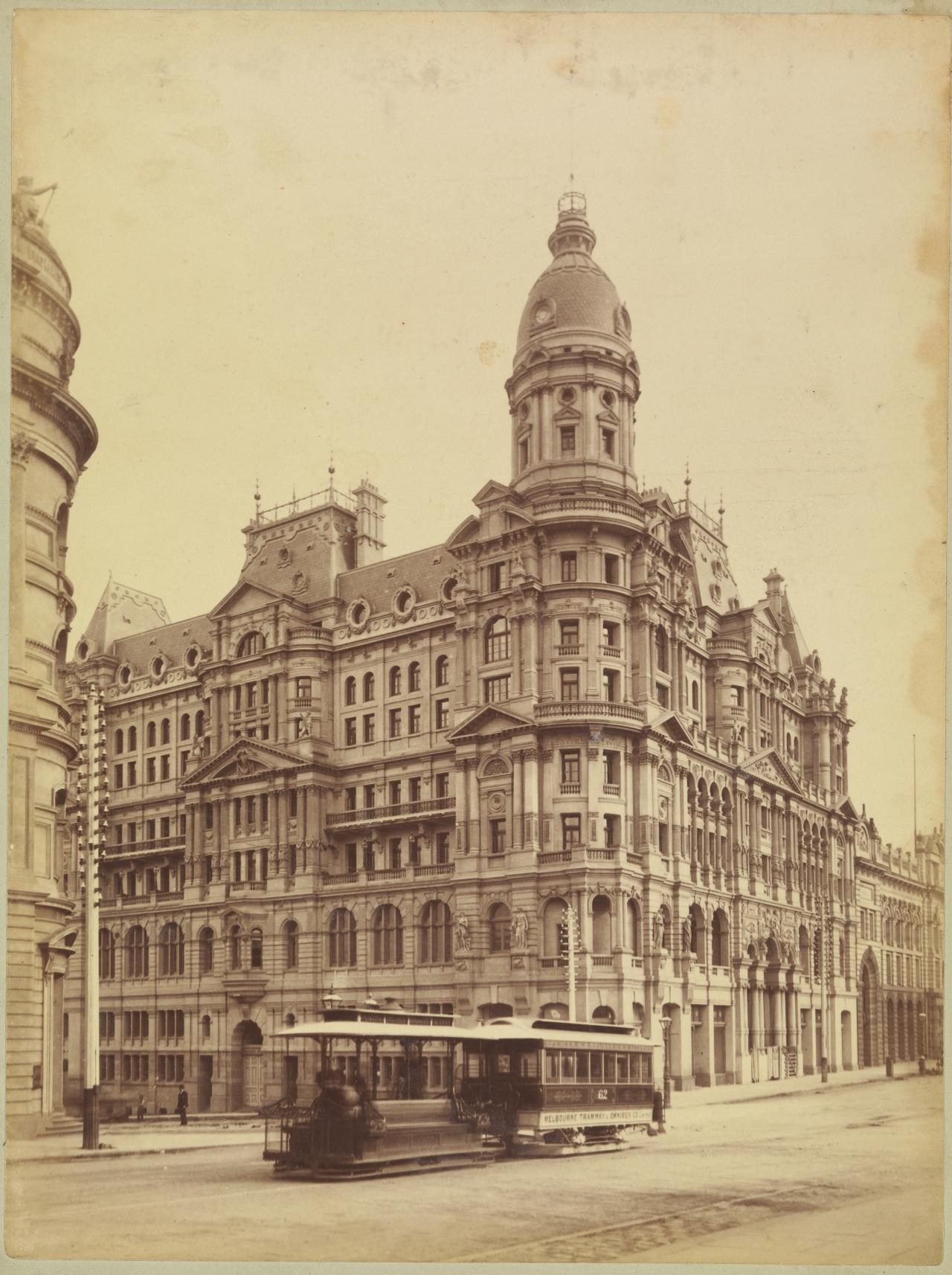
Photo of the Federal Coffee Palace in 1899.

Melbourne, the capital of Victoria, Australia has been through many booms and busts, and like many Western cities, especially in the English speaking world, lost notable buildings from earlier eras in the great redevelopment boom of the post WW2 decades. Melbourne is notable in particular for the land-boom of the 1880s producing "some of the world's most majestic buildings" of the era, as well as many large houses and mansions in the suburbs, which were in turn amongst those that were lost as the city sought to reinvent itself as a modern metropolis.

Whelan the Wrecker was by far the most successful demolition company in the postwar period, and was responsible for almost all of these losses, but often saved items such as statuary for resale.

The list is dominated by large, elaborate, Victorian era commercial buildings lost in the postwar years, but notable buildings from other periods were also demolished at that time, and some have been lost in more recent decades. Some notable early Victoria era buildings that were lost as early as the 1880s boom are also included, as well as some notable postwar buildings that have also been demolished.

The list is arranged by building type, and date of construction.

== Background ==
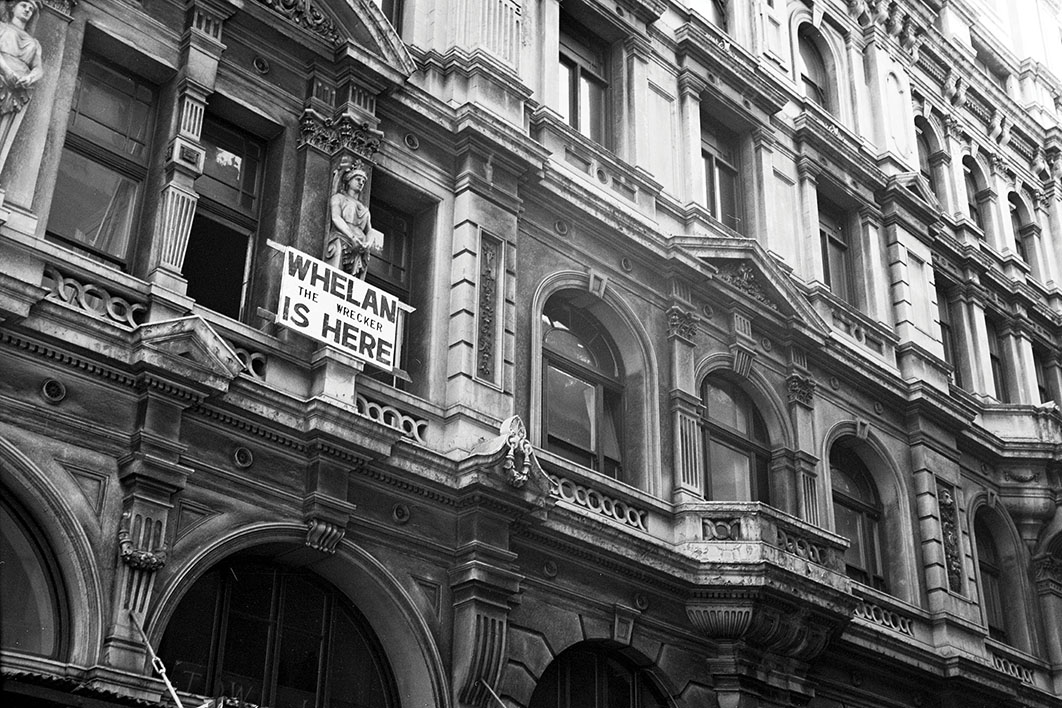
Whelan is Here: Sign on Town Hall Chambers advertising demolition by Whelan the Wrecker in 1968.

Melbourne began in 1835 as the base for the rapid settlement of the hinterland mainly for sheep runs; the 1850s Gold Rush resulted in huge growth to a population of 300,000 by 1854. During this period of great wealth and optimism, many large public buildings were built or begun. This was followed by steady growth in pastoral wealth and an urban economy based on industrial enterprises, and the town became a metropolis. Many grand buildings survive from this period, notably public buildings such as the State Library of Victoria, Parliament House, and the Royal Exhibition Building. This rapid development so astonished visiting journalist George Augustus Sala in 1885 that he dubbed the city "Marvelous Melbourne".

His visit was in the middle of the boom of the 1880s, when land prices increased as investors took advantage of easy credit from London and lax local financial regulations to feed strong demand. Speculation led to the development of large, elaborate offices, hotels, and department stores, along with large houses and mansions in extensive grounds, and suburban development along rapidly expanding railway lines. Surviving commercial buildings from this period include the Windsor Hotel, the Block Arcade, the Princess Theatre, and the Rialto Building Group.

Amongst the buildings of this boom period were a dozen office or hotel buildings of eight or nine levels, along with the eleven-storey Australian Building. These Victorian-era skyscrapers not only maximized the value of the land but were possible because of Melbourne's newly installed pressurized water system that was used to operate hydraulic lifts (elevators). This boom included the replacement of landmarks of the earlier decades, in some cases less than a decade old. This boom reached a climax in 1891, and was followed by the inevitable real estate bust, with many office buildings, shops, houses and mansions vacant or defaulting to bank ownership. City and suburban development did not restart until around 1900, and Edwardian era saw many fine commercial buildings added to the city skyline, and the first demolitions of mansions for smaller building lots. Development continued through the 1920s and 1930s, with increasing suburbanisation, as well as flats in the middle suburbs (including the conversion of mansions), and more commercial city buildings.

After the privations of WW2, and subsequent rationing, the economy began a long boom in the mid-1950s, which coincided with the ideals of efficiency and progress, disdain for anything old, Modernist architectural trends, a rapidly growing market for office buildings, and further suburban growth. Most of the largest Victorian era office buildings were demolished in this period, as they did not provide modern open plan office space, and were in the financial quarter of the city, where modern office space was in demand. More old mansions in the middle suburbs were demolished for subdivisions in this period as well.

In response to the many losses (in particular the threat of demolition of the Windsor Hotel), the Historic Buildings Preservation Act 1974 was introduced, establishing the Historic Buildings Preservation Council who determined which places were deemed to be of the highest 'State level' significance. Local heritage controls were introduced in the early 1980s, confirmed under the Planning and Environment Act 1987; now known as Heritage Overlays, large swathes of the inner city and middle suburbs, as well as many local landmarks, were protected.

However, some Councils were and still are slow to protect places, the Victorian Civil and Administrative Tribunal can overturn a listing, and the Planning Minister has always had powers of intervention, so significant buildings have continued to be demolished.

== The buildings ==
=== Office Blocks ===
The boom of the 1880s, along with the acceptance of lifts, led to the construction of speculative office blocks, sometimes quite large and elaborate. From a norm of five levels at most, from the late 1880s they suddenly emerged much taller, up to 10 floors, simply employing the existing technology of thick load bearing brick walls. The development of a high-pressure water system starting in 1888 allowed many buildings to adopt hydraulic lift systems, considered to be 'perfectly safe'.

==== Robbs Building (1884–1982) ====
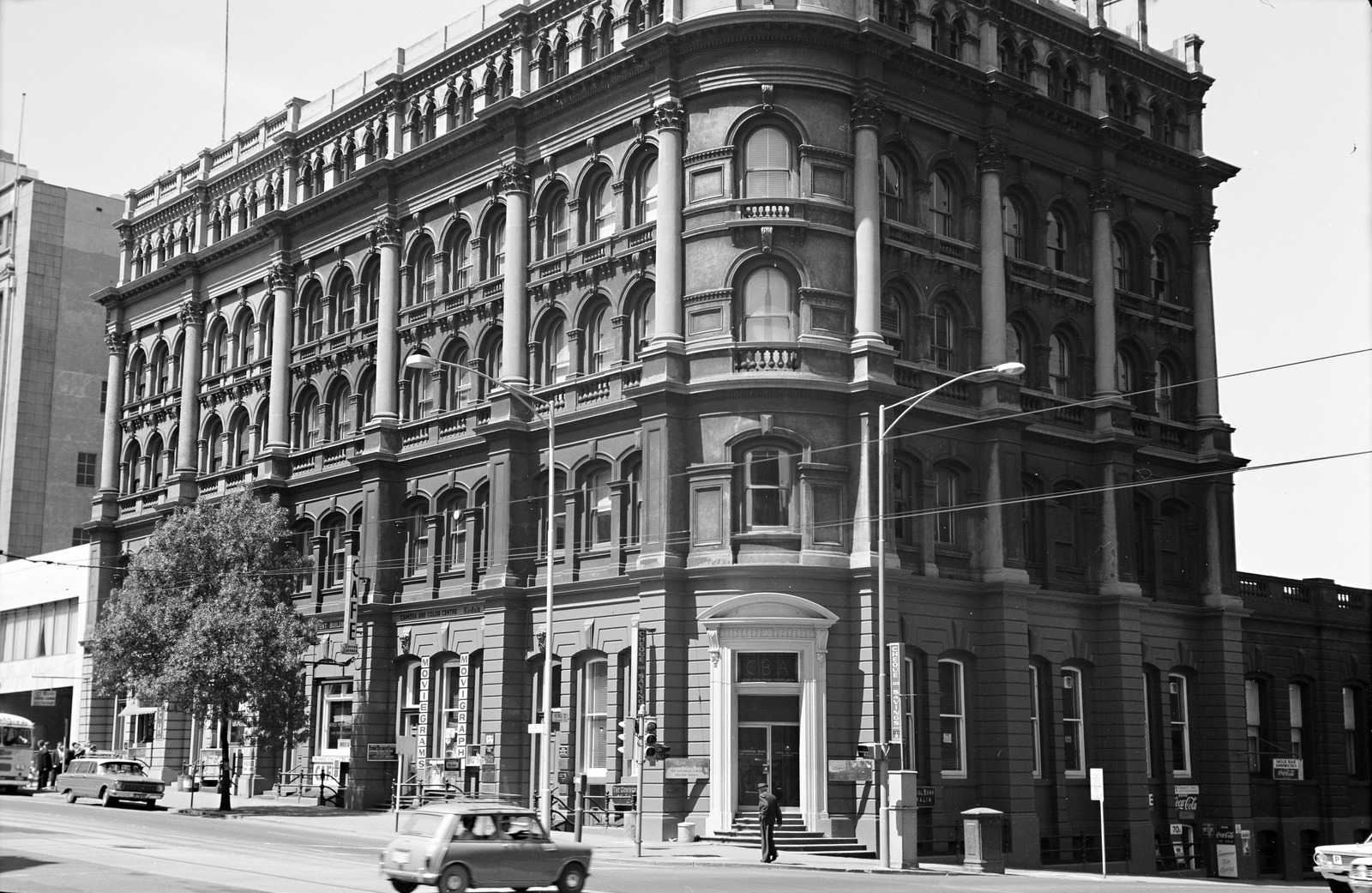
Robbs Building in 1968

In 1884, businessman and director of the Federal Bank, John Robb, financed a building 'of mammoth size' with 132 feet (40 m) of frontage on Collins Street, designed by architect Thomas Watts. It had two separate entrances, each with lifts and stairs, and goods lift from a rear lane, and spaces that could be offices or storerooms. The exterior featured vertical piers topped with Corinthian columns dividing its five storeys.

A number of mishaps were reported early in its life; in March 1888, a lift wire broke, causing an elevator to crash to the ground, and in August 1889, a fire broke out on the top floor. In the crash of the 1890s, Robb was declared bankrupt in 1894, owing £653,000. In 1926, the two eastern bays were separately known as the Dudley Buildings and sold for £88,000. The Dudley Buildings were demolished in 1975.

In the 1970s, National Mutual acquired the Robbs Building and the nearby Rialto Building Group, selling to the Grollo Group in January 1981, who revealed plans for a trio of high-rise office towers that would retain the Rialto but demolish the Robbs Building. The plan drew community opposition, and a Builders Labourer's Federation (BLF) ban. The BLF lifted the ban in November 1981 and demolition commenced in early 1982. The Rialto Towers were completed in October 1986 and the site of the Robbs Building became an open plaza, part of the Rialto towers forecourt. Between 2015 and 2017, a six level office building was built along the Collins Street frontage reinstating a continuous streetscape.

==== Prell's Buildings (x3) (1889, 1890–1967, 1969, 1980) ====
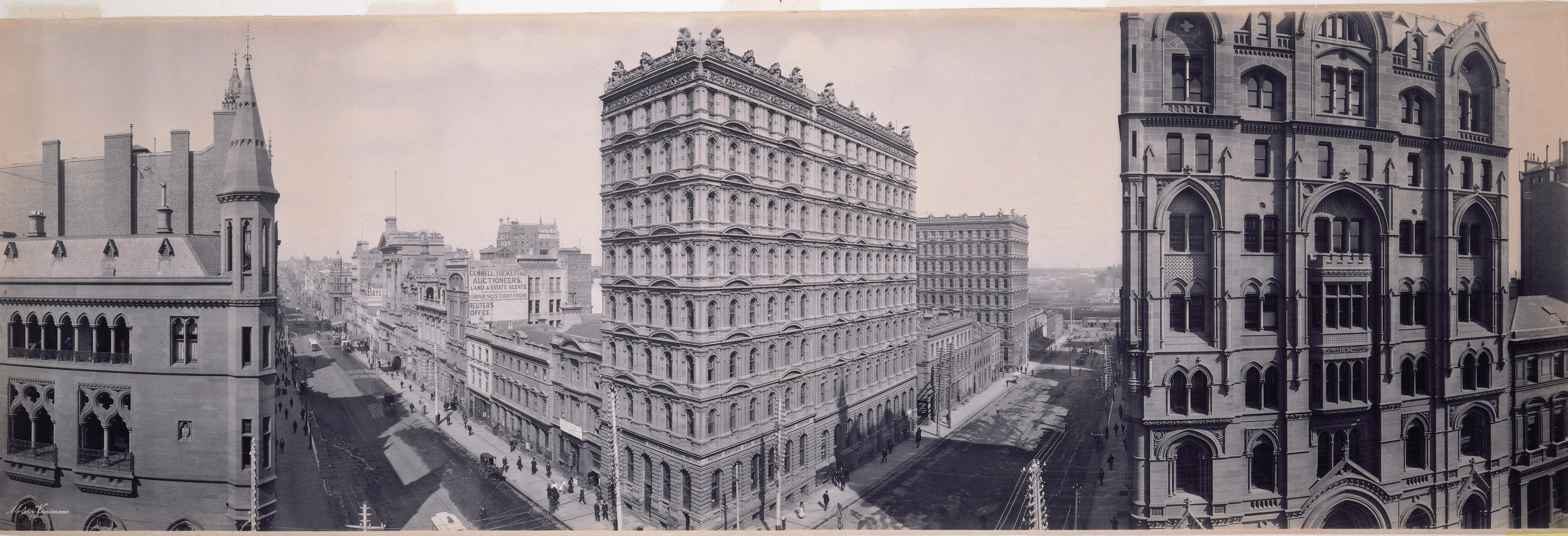
Two of Prell's Buildings viewed looking southeast from the corner of Collins and Queen Street in 1903, in the centre and behind. National Mutual Building is on the right.

Friedrich Wilhelm Prell was born in Hamburg, Germany, and migrated to Australia in 1851, founding an import/export business, and in the 1880s moved into property development. One of his first forays was a four-storey building at 7-11 Queen Street in 1886 (later known as the Felton building). Designed by architect FM White in a simple Renaissance Revival style, it features squared windows divided by piers, each floor the same, topped by an elaborate cornice with protruding large lion heads.

A later anecdote claimed that Prell met the vice-president of the Otis Elevator Company, W. F. Hall, while on holiday in Australia in late 1886, who remarked that men who had to climb stairs would reach the top floor with "aching legs, a fluttering heart, and a firm resolution to do business elsewhere", and Prell promptly added two floors to an office building already under construction, using the faster Otis hydraulic safety elevators. The veracity of this story is uncertain, but in late 1887 Prell was completing a five-storey office block (plus basement) on the northwest corner of Queen Street and Flinders Lane, using Otis safety elevators, though this was not their first use in Melbourne. Also designed by FM White, it was very similar in style to the earlier block, but somewhat more elaborate.

In late 1887 Prell announced plans for two more buildings, both nine storeys (eight plus half basements), all in the same block of Queen Street, one on the southeast corner of Flinders Lane, the other on the corner of Collins Street. F. M. White was again the architect, using a similar approach, but adding more elaboration such as superimposed piers and window pediments, elements repeating both vertically and horizontally, and topped by even larger cornices, featuring heads of Minerva and Mercury. In late 1888 Prell commenced a third block, also nine storeys, on the southwest corner of Flinders Lane, also by FM White, in matching style. By July 1889, a high-pressure hydraulic system was established in the city, and one of Prell's high-rise buildings was amongst the first to be connected to it, and the safety of the Otis elevators also demonstrated. The first two towers were completed around August 1889, and the third completed some time in 1890. Collectively known as Prell's Buildings, these structures dominated the southern aspect of the city and were known as "Towers of Babel of the elevator type". Sold to other investors the buildings variously became known by the name of the new owners or the main tenants.

Prell's building on the corner of Collins Street was bought by the Australian Provincial Assurance (APA), and extensively altered in 1929, simplifying the exterior, and adding an enormous decorative tower, becoming Melbourne's tallest building at 76 metres (the APA had moved from Melbourne's previous tallest building, the 1888 API Building). Later it was owned by Legal & General, who demolished it in 1969 for a new tower.

The five storey Prells building was demolished in 1938, and the other two of Prell's Buildings were demolished in 1967 and 1980, leaving only the Felton Building as evidence of his once dominating presence in the city.

==== Fink's Building (1888–1969) ====
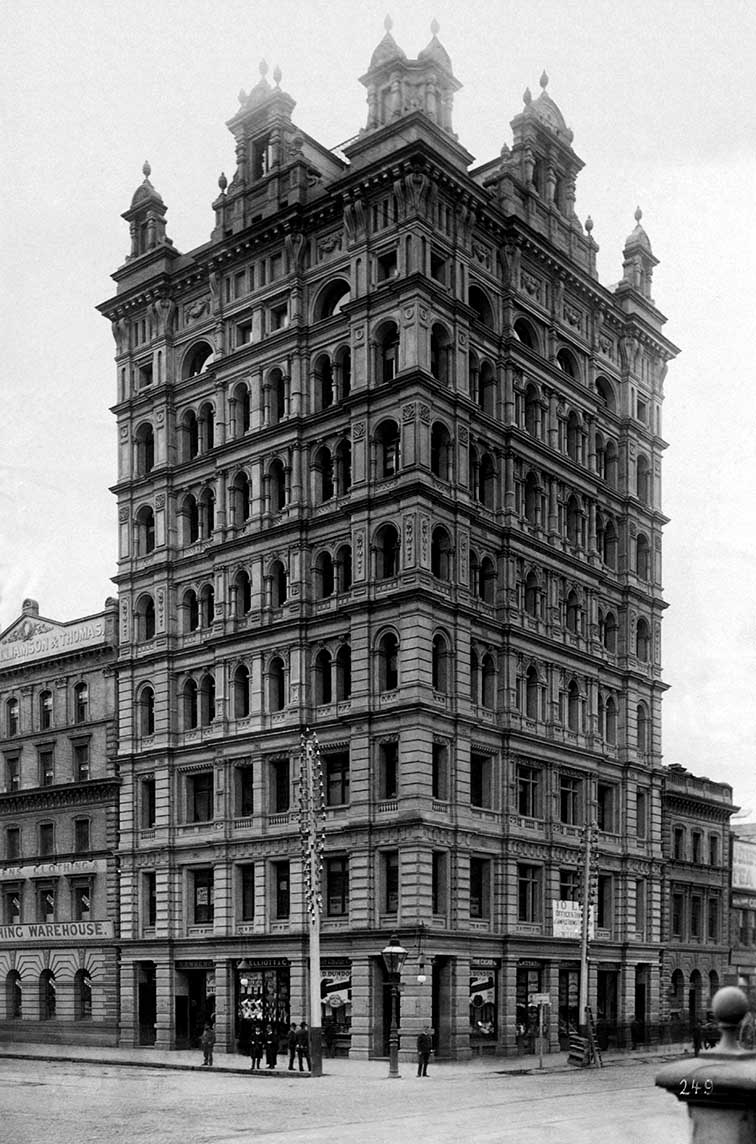
Fink's Building c. 1888

Located on the northeast corner of Elizabeth Street and Flinders Street, Fink's Building was a ten-storey office building, briefly Australia's tallest building when completed in 1888. Architects Twentyman & Askew designed it for Benjamin Fink, a speculative developer. The elaborate Renaissance Revival style building had a high mansard roof that encompassed its top two storeys. When the real estate market crashed, Fink fled to England, leaving behind debts of £1,520,000; he was declared bankrupt in 1892.

The building was gutted by the great fire of 1897 which swept across the block bounded by Flinders Street, Elizabeth Street, Flinders Lane, and Swanston Street. It was rebuilt in 1898, but as a much less imposing six-storey building, losing the attic and the top two floors. Purchased by the Commonwealth Bank in the late 1940s, they demolished it in 1969, along with the adjacent Craig Williamson's Department Store, to make way for a modern office tower.

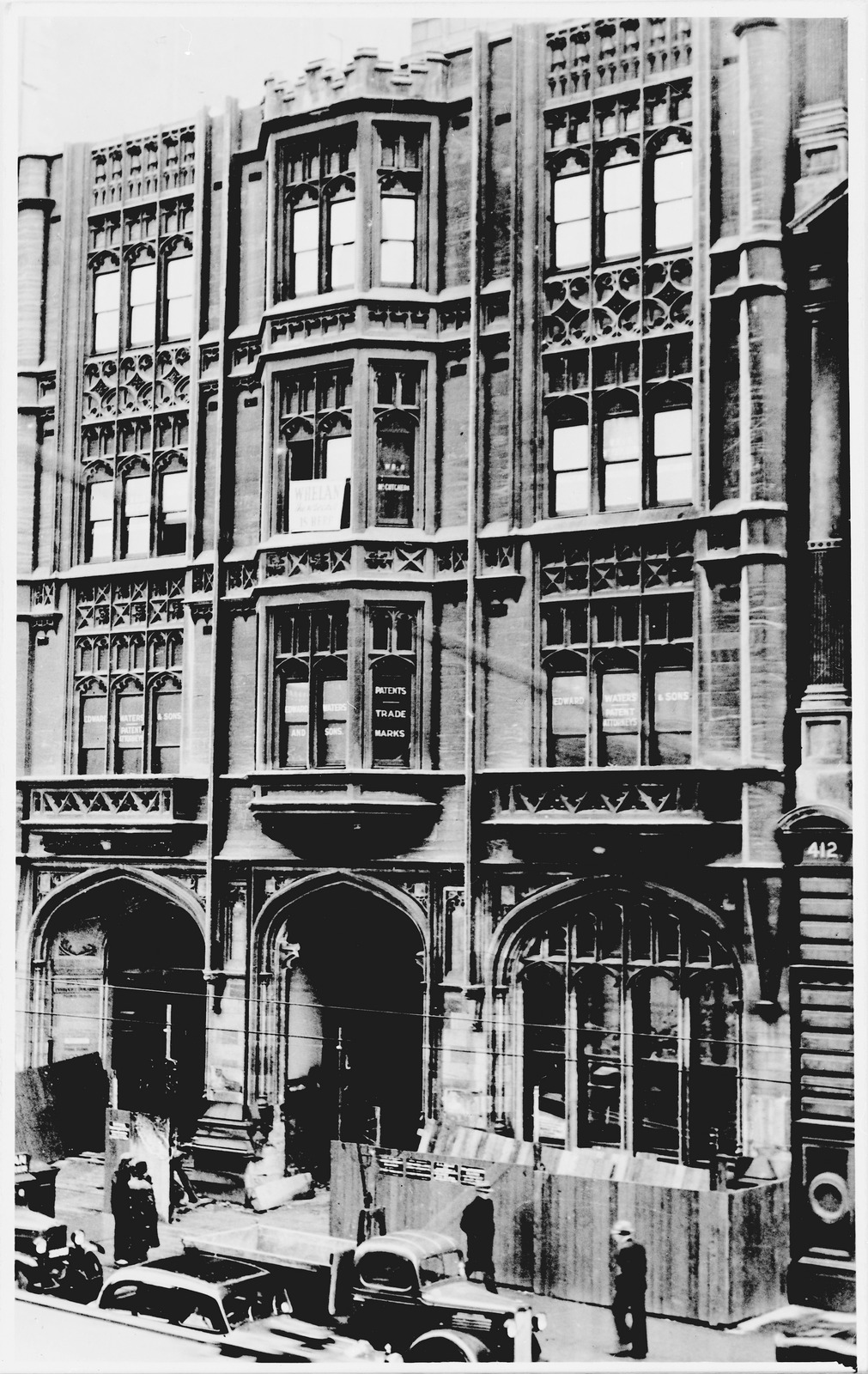
Empire Building demolition 1938

==== Empire Buildings (1888–1938) ====
Located at 414 Collins Street opposite the Western Market, the Empire Building was an elaborate six storey Tudor/ Gothic style office building, topped by a gable roof, and designed by TJ Crouch of Crouch & Wilson. Later it was occupied by Royal Insurance, who decided to replace it with a larger premises, and it was demolished in 1938. Some of the elaborate Gothic windows were dismantled and re-erected as part of the Great Hall at the Monstalvat artists colony in Eltham.

==== Australian Building (1889–1980) ====
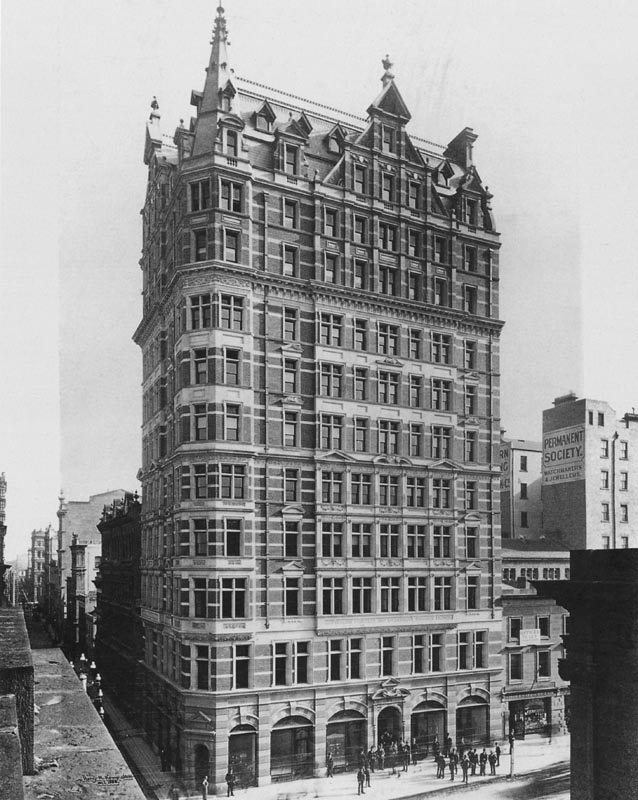
Australian Building

Located on the corner of Elizabeth Street and Flinders Lane, the Australian Building (also known as the API Building and the APA Building) was the tallest building in Australia and amongst the tallest in the world when it was completed in 1889. It included eleven storeys plus an attic, with a height to the top of the attic floor of 47 metres (154 ft), and to the top of the spire 51 metres (167 ft), The Australian Building was envisioned by F. T. Durham, postmaster general of Melbourne and director of the biscuit company Swallow and Ariell, who formed the Australian Property Investment Co. (API) which borrowed heavily to buy the site and build the landmark office block.

The building was designed by Oakden, Addison & Kemp with John Beswicke in the Queen Anne Revival style. Its exterior was finished in red brick with stone bands, topped by a gabled mansard roof and corner turret. Soon after its completion, the economy faltered and the offices could not be let, and soon Durham's debt was greater than the market value of the building. In 1920, the Australian Provincial Assurance Association, an insurance company, bought the building as their Melbourne base and renamed it the APA Building.

It remained the tallest building in Melbourne until the late 1920s and a city landmark until its top gables and turret were removed in the 1950s. In 1980 it was demolished despite a listing by Heritage Victoria because they agreed that the cost to upgrade the building to meet modern fire regulations was too onerous.

==== Temperance & General (T&G) (1888–1968) ====
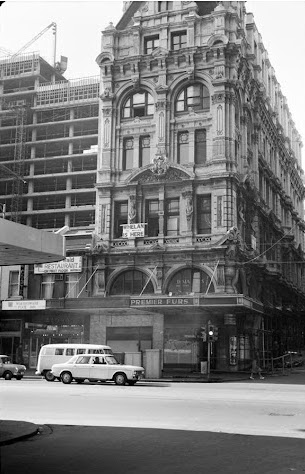
T&G demolition in 1968.

Built for the Temperance & General Mutual Life Assurance Society in 1888 on the corner of Little Collins and Swanston Streets, the six storey office block extended up Little Collins right across what is now Rainbow Lane over a carriageway opening. Architect Alfred Dunn was only 23 when he won a competition with a Second Empire style design, one of the most elaborate of the 1880s land boom era, featuring richly decorated facades and a tall tower-like mansard roof over the front portion topped with wrought iron sunflowers.

With the adjacent Town Hall being set back from the street, the building had a commanding presence looking north along Swanston Street, creating a notable ensemble. In 1928 the City of Melbourne purchased the building, renaming it Town Hall Chambers, using it for offices, and adding a floor. In the 1960s the council earmarked the site for open space, and in 1968 it was demolished by Whelan the Wrecker, however the site remained a carpark for decades until being rebuilt as a plaza with small cafe in the 1990s. The rear of the site across Rainbow Alley later became incorporated into the site for Council House 2 (CH2), completed in 2006.

==== Cromwell Building (1891–1970) ====
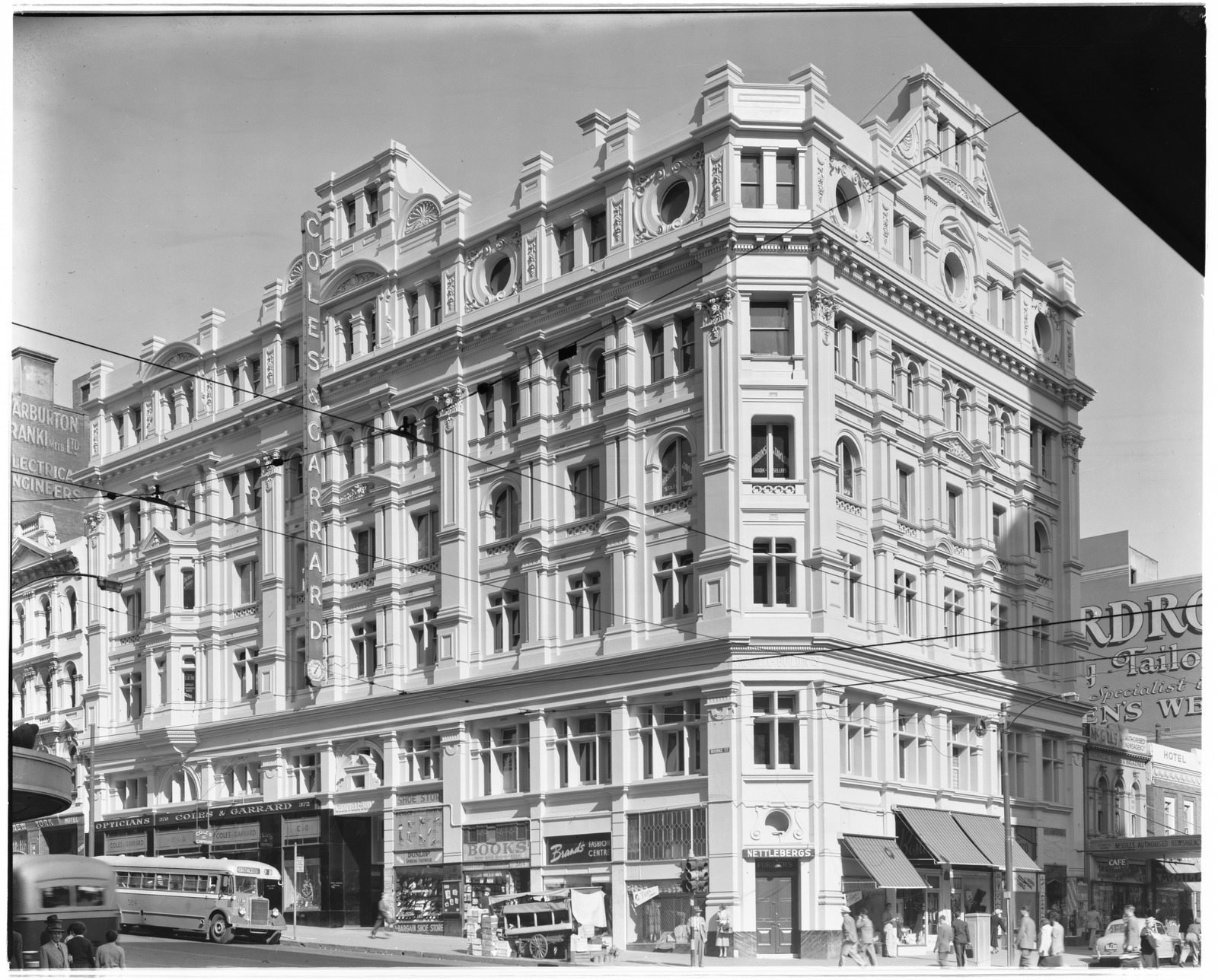
Cromwell Building in 1954

The Cromwell Building was an elaborate Mannerist/ Italianate style six storey office building on the corner of Bourke and Elizabeth Streets built in 1891, featuring a deeply modelled array of pilasters and windows, and a top level with large circular windows. It had a wide range of tenants, including the Fox Art Academy in the 1930s, and in the 1940s and 50s, Coles & Garrard Optometrists occupied a streamlined moderne shopfront on the Bourke Street side. The building was purchased by the Commercial Bank in 1946, and it was replaced by a new Cromwell Building in 1971, a sixteen-storey brown brick building which was itself demolished just two decades later in the 1990s for a three-storey retail development.

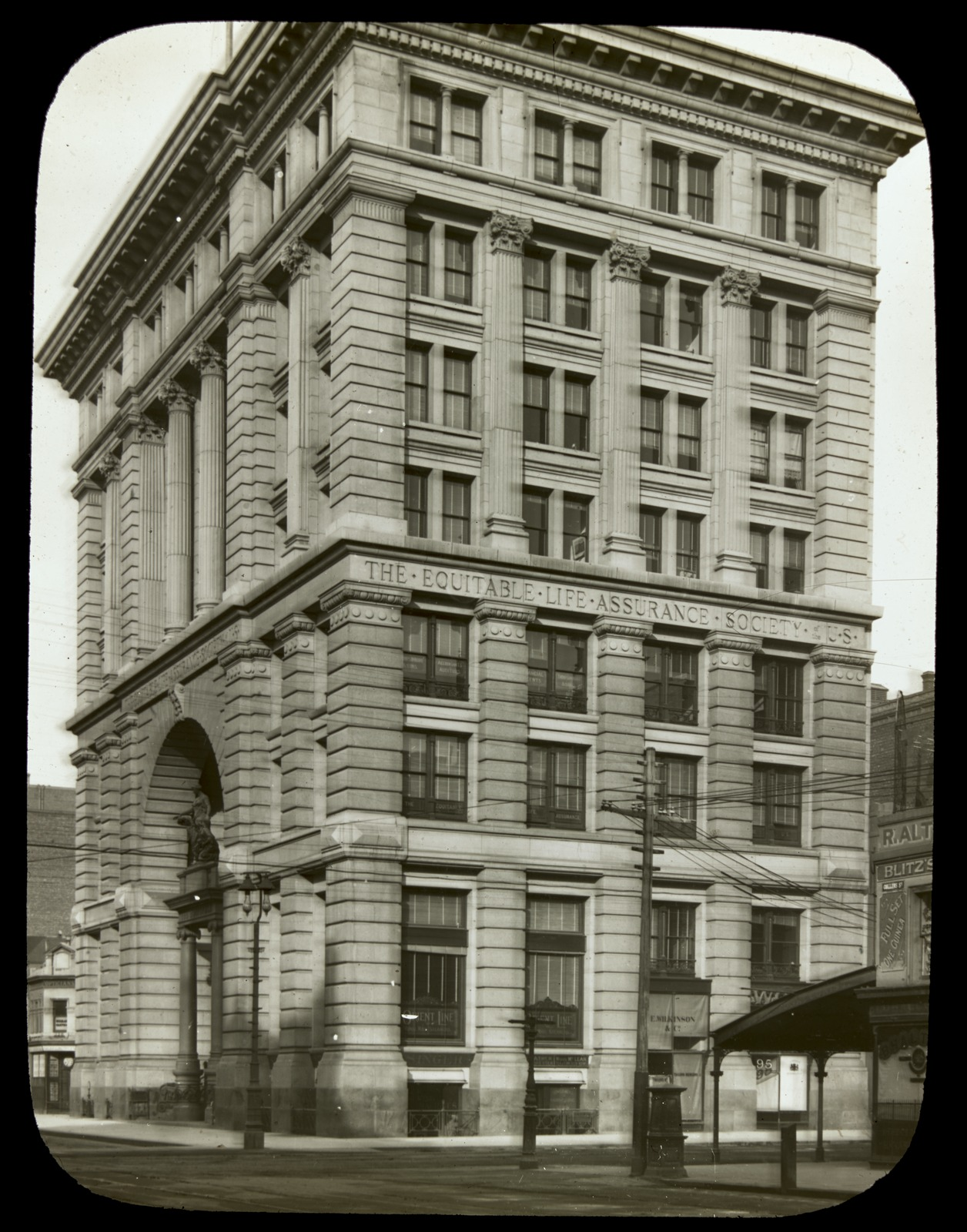
Equitable Building c1900.

==== Equitable Building (1896–1959) ====
The headquarters of the Equitable Life Assurance Society of the United States opened on Collins Street on the northwest corner of Elizabeth Street in 1896. German-born American architect Edward Raht designed it as "the grandest building in the Southern Hemisphere and to last forever", a seven-story structure of massive proportions. In the style of the skyscrapers then being built in New York, like them it had an internal steel frame, but facades of structural granite. Its construction took five years and cost £500,000, and at 138 feet (42 m), it was one of the tallest buildings in Melbourne at the time.

In 1923, it became the Victorian headquarters of Colonial Mutual Life. By the mid-1950s, Colonial Mutual contemplated demolition, as Victorian-era buildings were considered outdated, ostentatious, and gloomy, and it was demolished in 1959. The bronze statuary group over the entrance was saved and placed outside the Baillieu Library at the University of Melbourne, and some of the marble was reused in the new building, and others. In 2000, a sample of the carved stonework which had been bought by the Roads Board for crushing but instead kept was purchased by Museums Victoria and displayed outside the main Museum in Carlton on Nicholson Street.

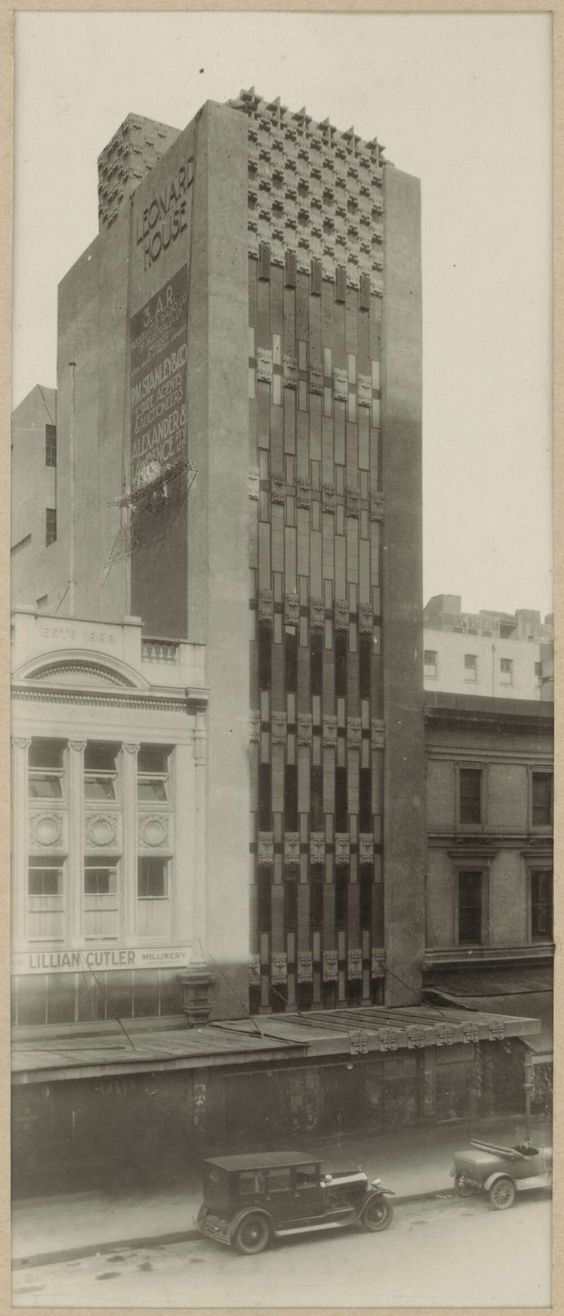
Leonard House in 1924

==== Leonard House (1924–1976) ====
This small office building at 40–46 Elizabeth Street near Flinders Lane was designed by renowned architect Walter Burley Griffin, who was from Chicago, and had settled in Melbourne after winning the competition to design Canberra in 1913. It was commissioned by Russian-Australian Nisson Leonard-Kavensky, a successful clothing manufacturer, and completed in 1924. It was the first building in the city to feature a curtain wall composed mainly of glass, as well as precast masonry blocks featuring Griffin's distinctive geometric patterning, and was later considered to be a pioneering Modernist design. When it was proposed to be demolished along with numerous other buildings in 1976 for an expansion of the nearby National Bank, opposition by the National Trust led to a portion of the facade being reconstructed within a light court of the new building, completed in 1980. Later this was discovered to be a replica, and it was covered over or removed.

==== Collins House (1911–1974) ====
Collins House in 1918 (National Library of Australia)

Collins House, the building that gave its name to the Collins House Group, stood at at 360-366 Collins Street, Melbourne. It was constructed in 1911 and owned, until 1960, by the Baillieu family. It was built by Eggleston & Oakely with consulting design by Walter Burley Griffin. The building had extensive additions in 1914, and it was said that the building "with its extension will have the largest ofllce accommodation of any building in Australia."

The base of the building was of trachyte from Bowral, NSW, the facade of Wangaratta stone, a granite with low mica content, paving of white Sicilian marble, with red marble from Orange, NSW. The building was in three parts; the front made of stone, the middle made of reinforced concrete, and the rear made entirely of brick. All floors were ferro-concrete. The building had a golf practice green on its roof, by late 1916. The building was further extended in 1925.

During the construction of Collins House, John Monash was the Superintending Engineer. His firm, Reinforced Concrete and Monier Pipe Construction Company, took a suite of nine rooms in the new building.

It was demolished in 1974, and replaced with the building that now occupies the site, which was upgraded in 2017. The original Collins House is not to be confused with the modern-day building of the same name, Collins House, at 464-466 Collins Street, Melbourne.

==== Gas & Fuel Buildings (1967–1997) ====
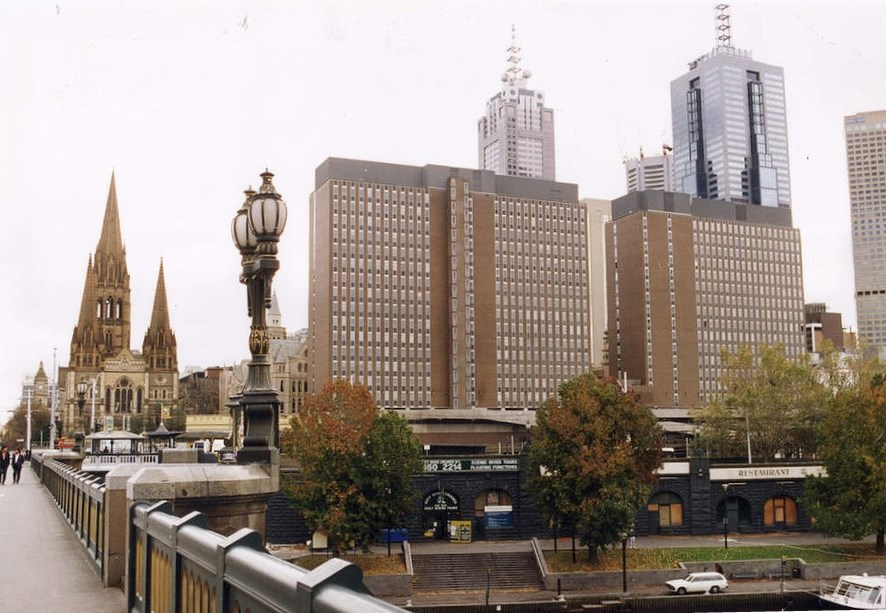
Gas and Fuel Towers, 1996.

This was a widely disliked pair of brown brick 1960s office towers located at the gateway to the city from the south, at the intersection of Flinders and Swanston Street. Officially titled the Princes Gate Towers, they were partly occupied by the Gas and Fuel Corporation of Victoria, hence the popular moniker. Designed by Leslie M Perrott & Associate and completed in 1967, they were built in the air-rights over Princes Bridge station, and included a raised plaza at the intersection. They were appreciated by some as modernist architectural icons, but were widely regarded as eyesores, due to their bulk and prominent position, detracting from the views towards St Paul's Cathedral from the entry to the city along St Kilda Road and Princes Bridge. They were demolished in 1997 to make way for Federation Square, the mixed-use development and public space that now occupies the site.

=== Retail ===
==== Eastern Arcade (1894–2008) ====
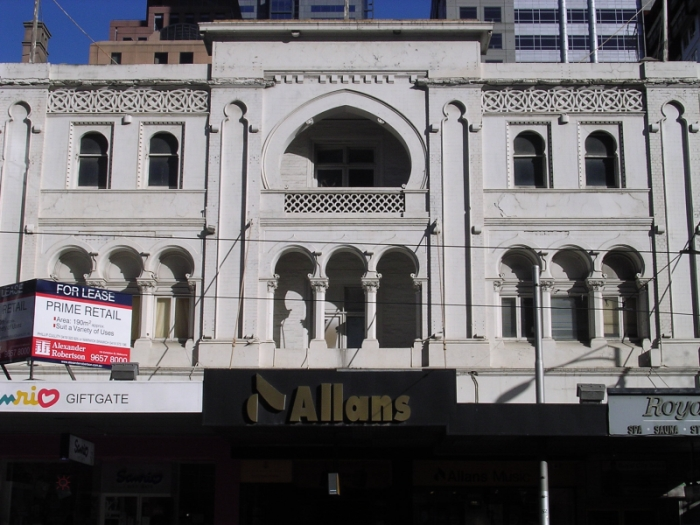
Eastern Arcade facade in 2006

The Eastern Arcade, on Bourke Street between Russell and Exhibition Streets, was built in 1872 adjacent to the Eastern Market on the site of the Haymarket Theatre, which had burned down. Designed by George Raymond Johnson in the Second Empire style, with three large mansard domed roofs, it was described as "one of the best examples of street architecture in the city", while its grand arched roofed arcade rivalled other arcades in the city. It was however just outside the central retail area, and perhaps was not as popular as it was hoped.

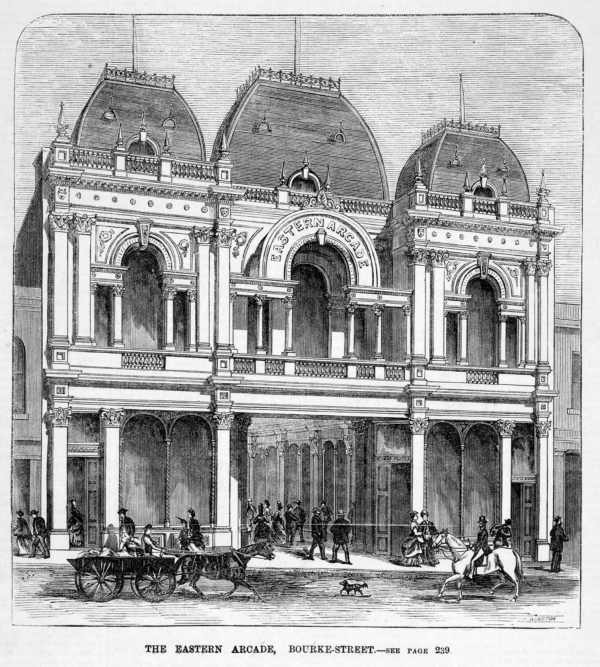
Eastern arcade design published 1872

In 1894 the frontage of the building was remodelled by Hyndman and Bates with an additional storey, and transformed into a fine example of the exotic, and rarely used, Moorish or Moghul style, featuring keyhole and pointed arches and coloured tiles (as seen in a photo from 1958).

In 1926 the arcade portion of the building was demolished to create two floors of the showrooms for furniture company Clauscen & Co, leaving the exotic frontage intact. In the 1970s the facade was completely covered in sheet metal hoarding, and by the 1990s it was home to Allans music store. In 2000 the facade was rediscovered after the metal hoarding was removed, which prompted the National Trust to list the building in September of that year.

A hotel tower was proposed in 2007, and despite calls that it was "shameful", a permit was granted, and the building was demolished in 2008, replaced by the Citadines on Bourke. The Little Collins Street facade is all that remains.

==== Coles Book Arcade (1883–1929) ====
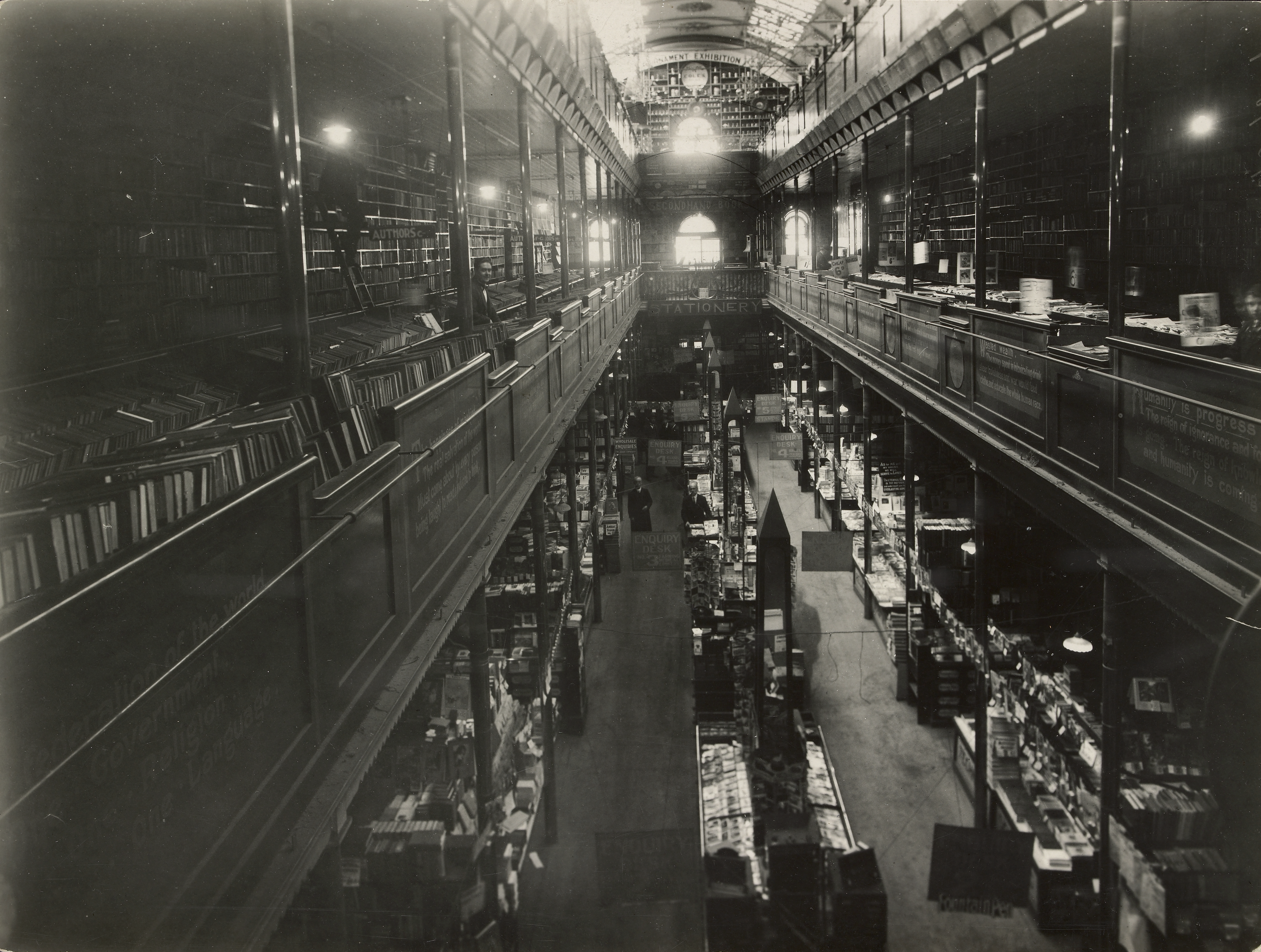
Cole's Book Arcade interior

The enterprising EW Cole established his first book arcade in 1873 in Bourke Street near the Eastern Market, moving to a much larger three level 'arcade' building at 299 Bourke Street in the retail heart of the city in 1883. His huge store grew into neighbouring buildings and across Little Collins Street, to link to Collins Street, and offered not only books, which were 'free to read, no need to buy', but also stationary, knick knacks, sheet music, and artworks, and there were entertainments such as a small orchestra, caged monkeys and birds, and a fernery. He also published his own works, most famously the Coles Funny Picture Book series, which delighted generations of children. After he died in 1911, the store continued on until 1928, when it was demolished and replaced by the main store for discount retailer Coles (no relation) which opened in 1930.

==== Victoria Building and Queens Walk (1888–1966) ====
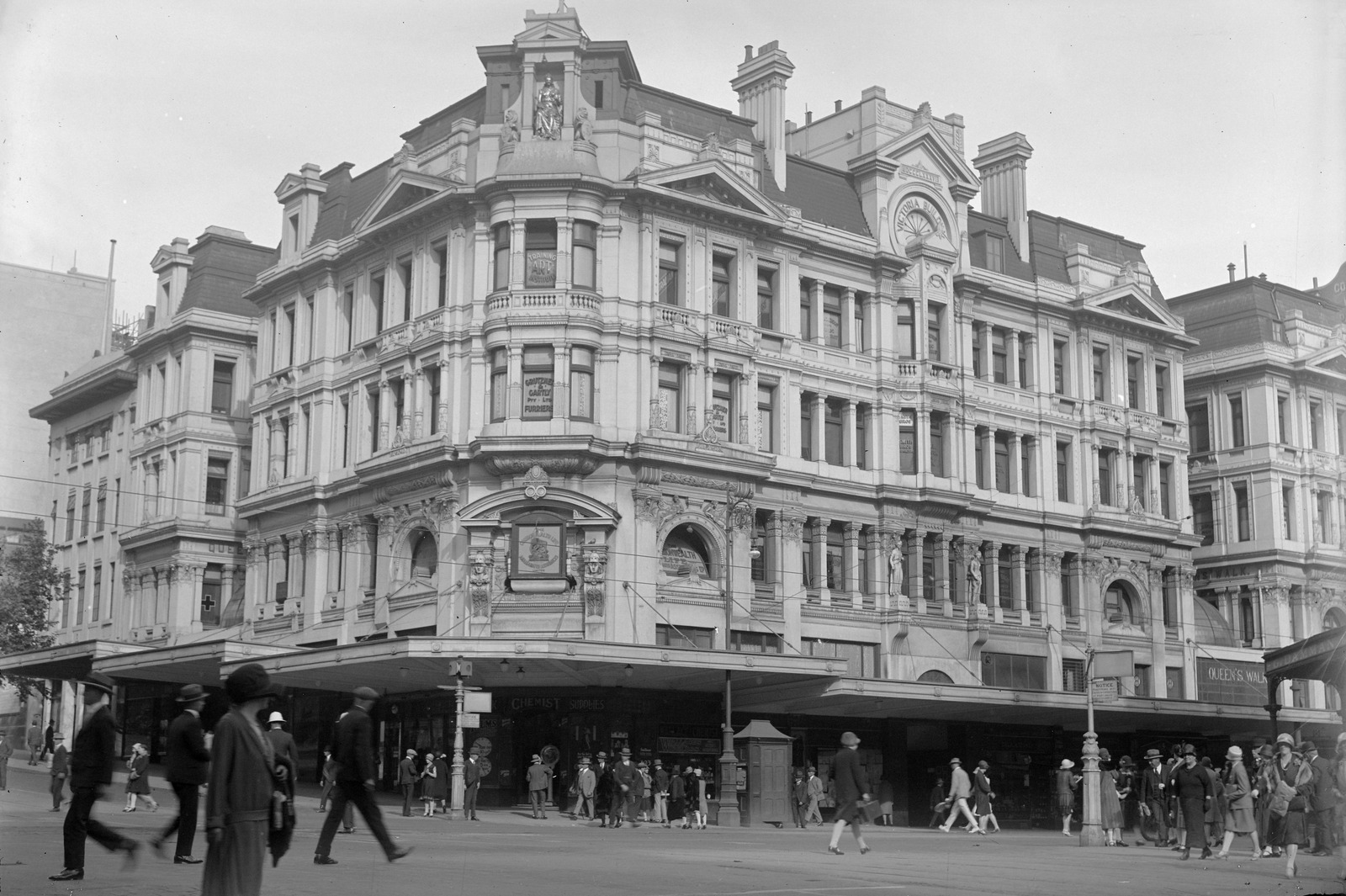
Victoria Building c1924

The Freehold Investment & Banking Co., one of the many land banks of the real estate boom years, built the Victoria Building in the heart of town on the corner Swanston and Collins Streets, opposite the Melbourne Town Hall. Designed by architect David Wormal, the building's Renaissance Revival façade was topped by a lively roofline of mansards and pediments. Completed in 1888, the Freehold Investment & Banking Co. had their office on the corner, and there were numerous shops, and three floors of offices above. The building was in two parts, separated by an L-shaped walkway called Queens Walk which contained some shopfronts and connected Collins Street to Swanston Street. A statue of Queen Victoria sat on the corner beneath the building's landmark tall diagonal roof (the latter was removed by 1910).

In 1922 the walkway was refurbished as an arcade, with more shops with new shopfronts, a glass roof with large leaded-glass cupolas at the entrances, and renamed Queens Walk Arcade. Later, the arcade included twenty shops with tenants such as Cavalier Tea Rooms, Drummunds, tailor Henry Bucks, and the Savage Club was located upstairs. The Victorian Government Tourist Bureau, an arm of the Victorian Railways, occupied the corner shop from 1908 to 1940, later occupied by Henry Bucks menswear. The Victoria Building was sold in 1963 and demolished in 1966 for potential high-rise development. However, the City of Melbourne purchased the vacant site for its new City Square, which was completed in 1980. The square was replaced in 2000, and the replacement was itself demolished in 2018 as part of works for the Melbourne Metro.

==== Craig, Williamson and Thomas Emporium (1898–1969) ====
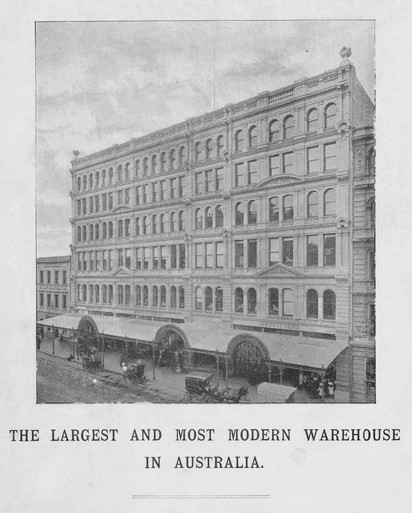
Craig Williamson and Thomas Emporium c1900

Craig Williamson and Thomas began as a drapery in 1874 as Weaver, Craig and Orrock in Elizabeth Street. Adopting a policy of selling direct to customers at warehouse prices, but only in cash, the business grew rapidly, and by 1883 they occupied a four-storey building on Elizabeth Street, and a series of lower buildings to the south. In 1890, they replaced two of those with a new seven-storey building designed by architect F Williams, expanding the range of goods, with fabric, clothing, millinery, and homewares departments. The Great Fire of 22 November 1897 started in the store, and destroyed a large part of the city block, leaving the store's buildings as gutted shells and a stock loss of £100,000.

The store was completely rebuilt as a single larger building, designed by F Williams in a style similar to the 1890 façade, but simpler and one floor lower, creating a very large premises. In 1913 there was a further matching extension to the north and an addition of two floors, creating an even larger department store, and a massive facade. The business closed in 1937, and in 1945, the building was sold to the Federal Government for a branch of the Commonwealth Bank. The adjacent Finks Building was replaced by 1968 with an office tower, which was extended two years later replacing Craig Williamsons.

==== Cafe Australia - Australia Hotel (1916–1939–1989) ====
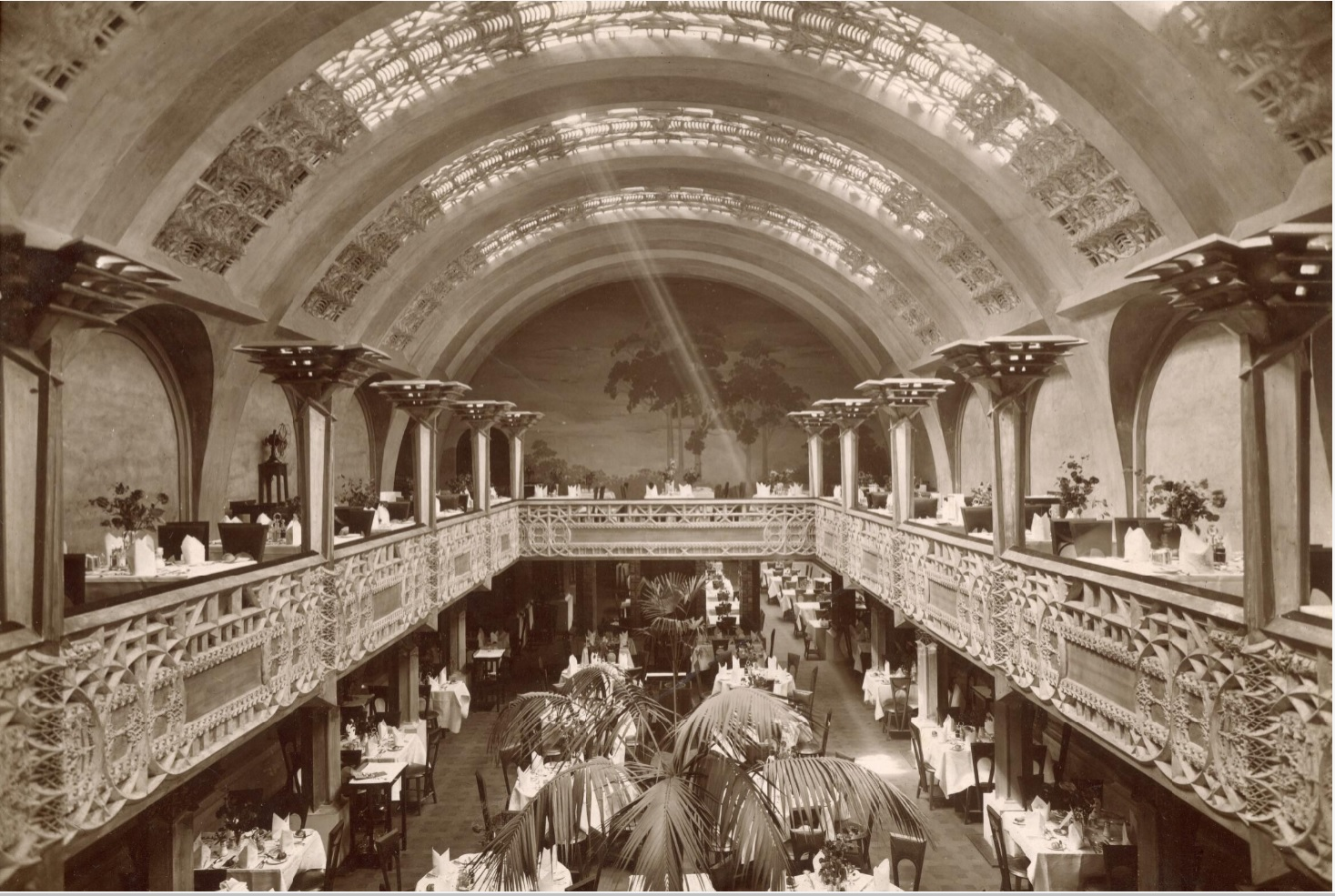
Cafe Australia Banqueting Hall

In 1916, having closed the once popular Vienna Cafe in the centre of "The Block' of Collins Street due to its German connotations during WW1, Greek-Australian entrepreneur Antony JJ Lucas completely rebuilt the venue, reopening as the Cafe Australia. For the design, he commissioned renowned architects Walter Burley Griffin and his wife, Marion, who had moved to Australia from Chicago having won the competition to design Canberra in 1913. They created a series of rooms with strikingly original decor, with a low ceilinged Fern Room and Fountain Court leading to a grand arch-roofed two level Banqueting Hall, lit from skylights and indirect light fittings. Sculpture and painting, planting and the fountain were all integrated into the designs, which featured their trademark geometric patterns, and they also designed all the furniture. The cafe remained popular until it was demolished along with other properties for the Modernist style Hotel Australia, opened in 1939, which included a double height arched roofed dining room in homage to the earlier space. Designed by concrete specialist Leslie M Perrott, the hotel was the most up-to-date in Melbourne, and its numerous bars and restaurants became smart society venues; it included a shopping arcade through the ground floor and two small cinemas in the basement. The hotel was demolished in 1989 for a new budget hotel and an expanded multi-level shopping centre called the Australia on Collins, with the retail floors rebuilt and renamed St Collins Lane in 2016.

=== Public Buildings ===
==== National Museum, University of Melbourne (1863–1968) ====
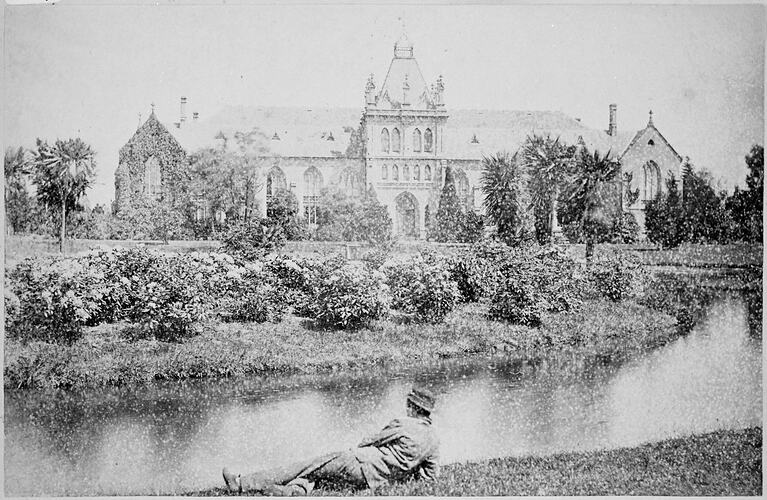
National Museum and lake in 1885. Designed by Joseph Reed.

In 1854 a "Museum of Natural and Economic Geology" was established in Melbourne, moving to the University of Melbourne in Parkville in 1856, and in 1858 University Professor by Frederick McCoy was appointed first director. A large new purpose-built venue was soon funded on the university grounds which opened in 1863, renamed the National Museum of Victoria.

Designed by architects Reed & Barnes (Joseph Reed with Frederick Barnes), it was a large Gothic Revival building, in keeping with other university buildings, albeit in pale bricks rather than stone, with a prominent central tower. It was located north of the main quadrangle, facing an ornamental lake and garden. The interior had two levels of display space, opening into a double height hall with a timber truss roof. Soon after McCoy's death in 1899 the collection was moved to the gradually expanding State Library and Museum of Victoria site in Swanston Street, and the old Museum became home to the university's Student Union. In 1938 a large new wing was added to the west by architects Gawler & Drummond in a sympathetic Gothic style, which also saw the northern wing of the Museum refurbished as a home for the Union Theatre.

In a series of rebuilding campaigns in the 1960s, new Union facilities, designed by architects Egglestone Secomb McDonald were built, replacing the tower and south wing of the old National Museum, completed in 1970. The Union theatre section was partially retained, leaving only a single Gothic window to the north, and four of the roof trusses.

With the construction of a new Student Precinct in the south east corner of the campus in 2022, demolition of the old Union has been mooted.

==== Wilson Hall, Melbourne University (1882–1952) ====
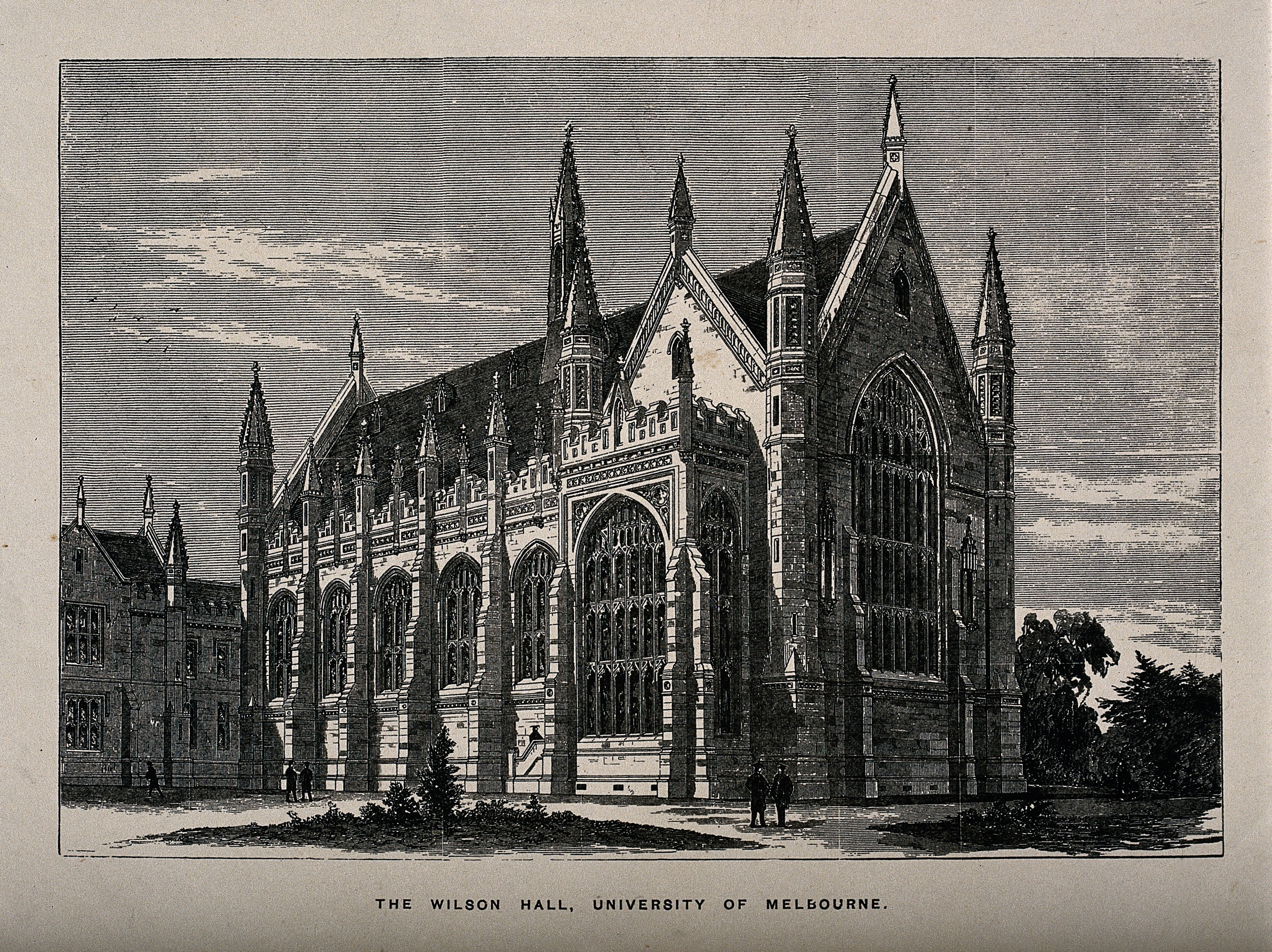
Wilson Hall 1882

The construction of a large ceremonial hall for conferring University degrees, examinations and other events was made possible by a gift from Sir Samuel Wilson £30,000 toward its construction 1874. Designed by prominent architects Reed & Barnes (Joseph Reed), and built by James Nation & Co, it was designed on a large scale in the Perpendicular Gothic style, with a high timber hammer-beamed roof, stained glass windows and a tall gabled roof, and was completed in 1882. Wilson Hall was later considered one of the most important secular Gothic Revival buildings constructed in Melbourne, with architectural historian Philip Goad describing the building as the "architectural jewel in the nineteenth century university".

On the afternoon of Saturday 26 January 1952, the building was gutted by fire in front of a gathering crowd of shocked spectators, destroying artworks, stained glass windows, the organ and the majestic roof. The walls largely survived the fire, but instead of opting for reconstruction the university took the less expensive route and demolished the remains, to build a contemporary replacement, designed by Reed's successor firm Bates Smart McCutcheon, which opened in 1956.

==== Eastern Market (1879–1960) ====
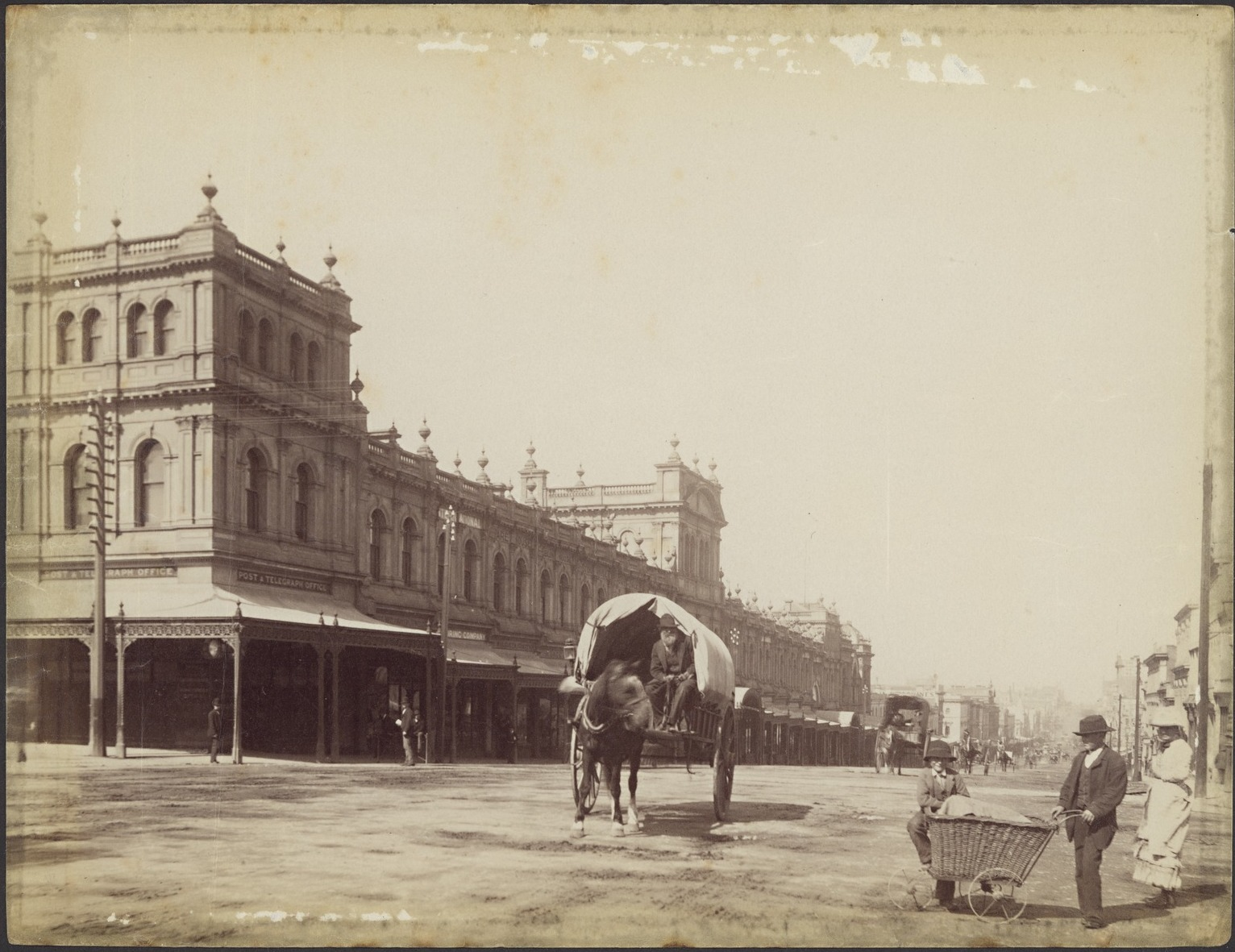
Eastern Market c1880

In 1847, the Melbourne City Council opened half a block bounded by Bourke Street, Exhibition Street, and Little Collins Street as a general market, building a series of open sheds in 1859. In 1877, the city council decided to rebuild the market on a grand scale. The architectural firm Reed & Barnes won a design contest for a structure featuring two and three-storey shops along the street fronts, with a two-level central market hall inside topped by arched glass roofs. The new Eastern Market opened in 1879 but during its construction, its former fresh produce merchants moved to the expanded Queen Victoria Market and had little interest in returning.

In 1881, the city council leased the market to Edward Cole who operated the highly successful Coles Book Arcade nearby. Cole filled the Eastern Market with amusements such as hoop-las, shooting galleries, and fortune tellers; second-hand stalls, a haberdashery, and fresh food vendors. After a year, the city council resumed control, but the Eastern Market never fulfilled its intended purpose, and it remained a part of the amusement nightlife of Bourke Street for many decades, described by the Herald in 1923 as a "resort for the undesirables". By the 1950s, the amusement businesses had closed, and the lower hall became a car park and taxi depot. The city council began negotiations to replace the market with a hotel; Whelan's demolished the building in 1960, which was replaced by the Southern Cross Hotel, opening in 1962.

Another market on the corner of Market Street and Collins Street, known as the Western Market, was first established in 1841, and rebuilt in stages in the 1870s, but was much less grand or busy than the Eastern Market. Like that market, the Council saw an opportunity for a landmark redevelopment, and it was demolished 1961 for the National Mutual Building, with a spacious plaza in front. The building was in turn demolished in the 2020s for an even larger building known as Collins Arch.

==== Fish Market (1892–1959) ====
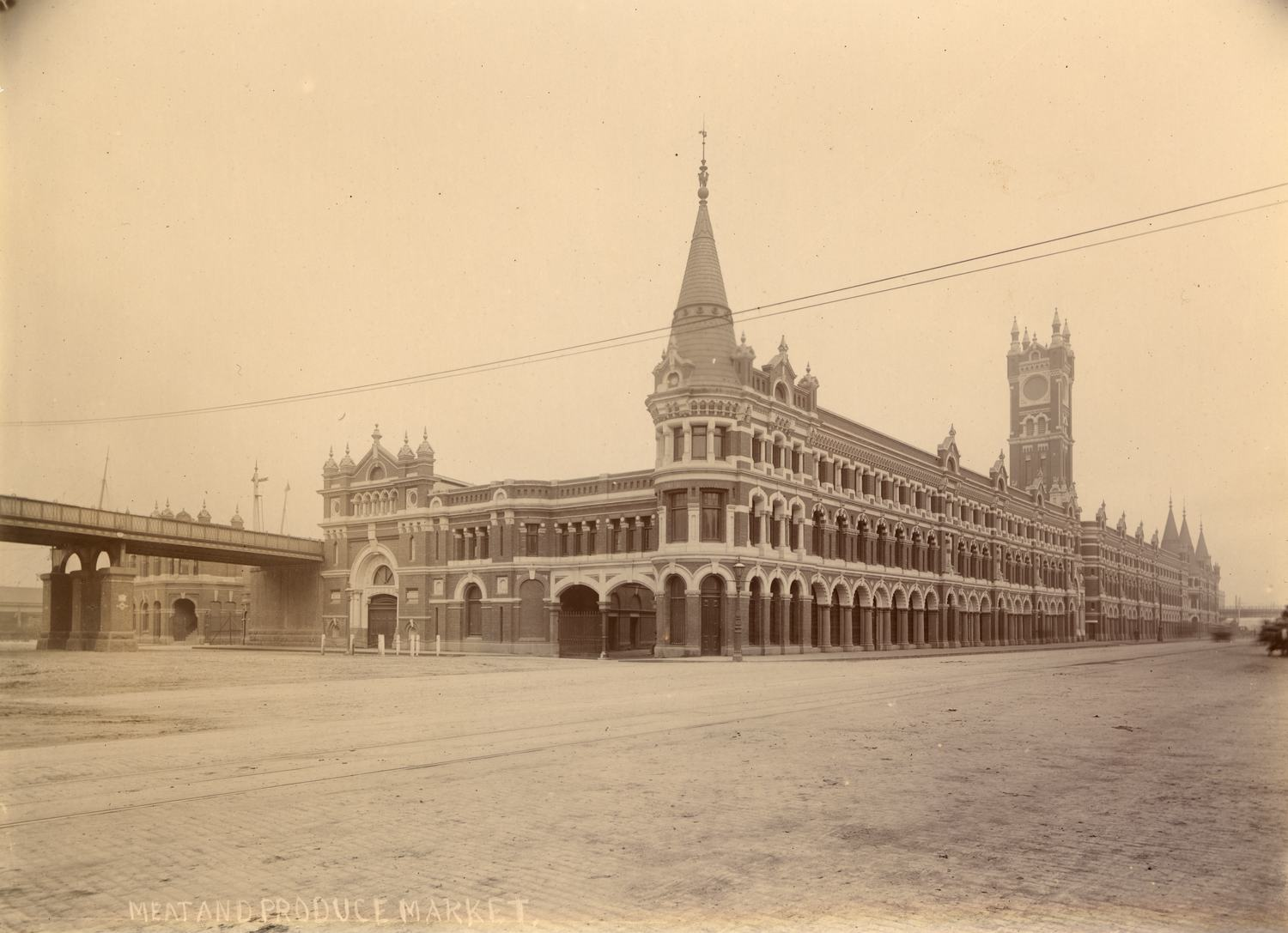
Fish Market c. 1892

Melbourne's first fish market was built in 1865 on the prime south west corner of Swanston Street and Flinders Street, until the Melbourne City Council built a grand new facility at the western end of Flinders Street, which opened in 1892. It was built in two parts either side of the new railway viaduct connecting Flinders Street Station to Spencer Street Station. The block-long part facing Flinders Street housed general markets and storage, while the fish market itself was on the other side of the viaduct, facing the river, and it served as Melbourne's commercial fish market for nearly 70 years.

Architect RG Gordon won the competition for the design with a landmark Gothic Revival style building featuring multiple tall conical turrets, and a large clock tower in the centre, though the clock was never installed. Described at the time of its completion as one of the finest set of market buildings in the world, the Fish Market was also controversial, running 22% over budget at £220,000. Though a striking addition to the city scape, there were regular problems and criticisms. As early as 1895, some subsidence and cracking became apparent, which was again reported in 1910, and again in 1922. In 1939 the market was described as obsolete, and in 1946 was described as an eyesore and unhygienic, but remained in use for another decade.

By the 1950s, the market was surrounded by busy roads and could not accommodate the increasing volume, and there were plans to extended King Street across the river, and taking Flinders Street over King Street on a viaduct, which would necessitate demolition of part of the market building. The Melbourne City Council decided to build a new fish market, and purchased a large site in West Melbourne for the fish, fruit and vegetable wholesale markets in 1956. The new fish market was built first, and opened in 1959, and Whelan's demolished the old market in the same year. Its elaborate wrought-iron gates were saved and are now at the entrance to Fawkner Cemetery. The site of the market was used as a car park which included additional land reclaimed from the Yarra river; eventually the riverside portion was landscaped in 1982 and became Batman Park. In 2009, the Flinders Street portion was developed into an apartment, office and retail complex called Northbank Place.

=== Hotels ===
==== Menzies Hotel (1867–1969) ====
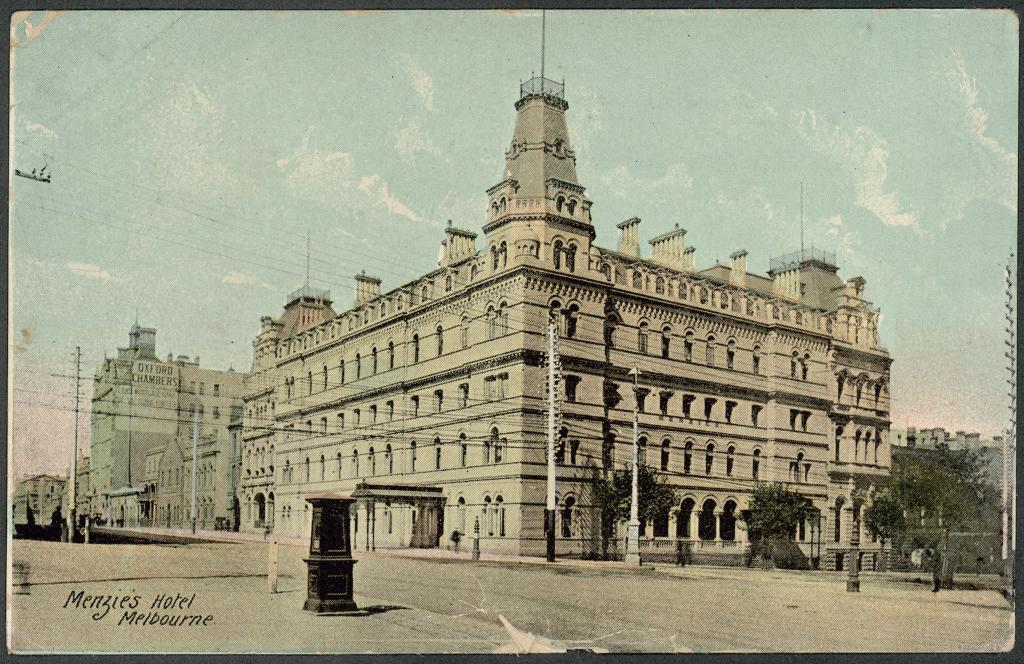
Menzies Hotel in 1908

In the late 1860s, Scottish immigrants and long term hoteliers Archibald and Catherine Menzies commissioned Reed & Barnes to design the Menzies Hotel for them on the crest of the hill on Bourke Street, on the southeast corner of William Street. The three-storey hotel in Italianate style featured distinctive bell-shaped corner towers, and cost £32,000. When it opened in November 1867, it was Melbourne's first grand hotel and was immediately popular with international visitors and wealthy pastoralists. In 1887, an addition was made on the William Street side including a large new dining room. In 1897, extensive additions designed by DC Askew were made, including two more floors, a new tall corner tower, an extension on Bourke Street matching the earlier one on William Street, and facilities including electric lights, telephones, lifts, suites with attached bathrooms, and a Moorish 'winter garden'. In 1924 the William Street addition was replaced by a new addition, both taller and wider, providing more rooms and a further enlarged dining room.

Famous guests included Mark Twain, Alexander Graham Bell, Herbert Hoover, and Dame Nellie Melba, and in 1872 British author Anthony Trollope noted that he had never stayed 'at a better inn in any part of the world'. For several months during World War II in 1942, it became the South-West Pacific headquarters for General Douglas MacArthur. By the mid-1960s, competition from new inner city motels, the new Southern Cross Hotel, and licensed restaurants, meant the Menzies faced declining patronage, while the site increased in value, and it closed and was demolished in 1969 to make way for the BHP Tower.

==== Oriental Hotel (1878–1971) ====
In 1878, a rather grand three storey coach factory built about 1861 in the prestigious eastern end of Collins Street opposite the Melbourne Club was refurbished to become the Oriental Hotel. It was notable principally for its dining room, which quickly developed a reputation for having some of the best cuisine in Melbourne, popular with the city's elite; lawyers, bankers, politicians, and pastoralists would meet at the Oriental. In 1910 following a disagreement with management while staying there, businessman Pearson Tewksbury bought the property, and immediately renovated and built a five-storey addition on the east side. In 1955, the hotel was bought by Leon Ress, and his French born wife suggested that cafe tables on the footpath, only seen in a limited way previously Melbourne, would be a good idea. Temporary permission was finally granted in 1958, and the nineteen tables and colourful umbrellas were immediately popular, and much photographed. However, in the face of continuing opposition from the Police Traffic Branch, they and the few others that had been permitted, were removed two years later. Along with much of the surrounding block, the hotel was demolished 1971–72 for Collins Place.

==== Federal Coffee Palace (1888–1973) ====
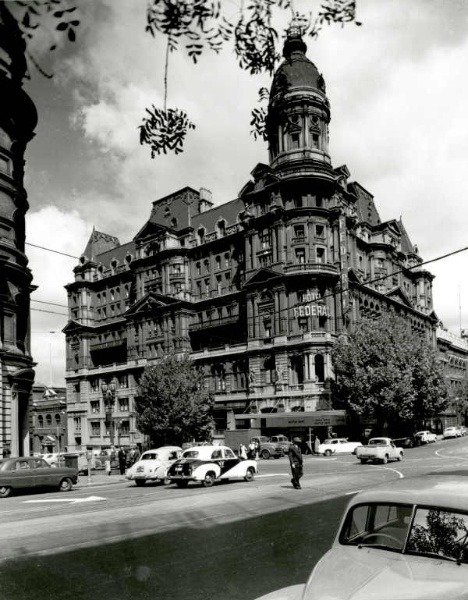
Federal Hotel in the 1950s

The Federal Coffee Palace was probably the largest and grandest hotel built in Australia in the 19th century, and certainly the largest and grandest the alcohol-free Coffee Palaces built in the country. It was located at the western end of Melbourne's premier thoroughfare, Collins Street, on the corner of King Street, near Spencer Street Railway Station. The venture was promoted by James Munro and James Mirams, both politicians, businessmen, and teetotalers. A design competition was held, and the first and second prize winners were asked to work together, combining the eclectic style of the exterior of Ellerker & Kilburn, and the interior arrangements of William Pitt. The design combined an array of Renaissance Revival details and French Second Empire style mansard roofs, culminating in a tall corner turret topped with a dome, and it opened in time for Melbourne's Centennial Exhibition in July 1888.

The first floor included facilities such as a billiards room, dining, lounging, reading, and smoking rooms. Its upper five floors included nearly 400 bedrooms, with suites on the second floor, and multiple small rooms above. The Age wrote that the £150,000 hotel was one of "Australia's most splendid" buildings, and "one of the largest and most opulent hotels in the world". Its guests included Alexander Graham Bell, Herbert Hoover, and Mark Twain.

Despite that opulence, the Federal Coffee Palace was never a competition for Melbourne's leading hotels in the late 19th and early 20th centuries, the Menzies, Scotts and the Hotel Windsor. Renamed the Federal Palace Hotel, the owners eventually gave up on temperance, and were granted a full liquor license in 1923. A renovation in the late 1960s was not enough to revitalize the struggling business, and it closed in 1972. The building was demolished in 1973 to make way for an office tower that was, in turn, demolished in 2019.

==== Parer's Crystal Café and Hotel (1888–1960) ====
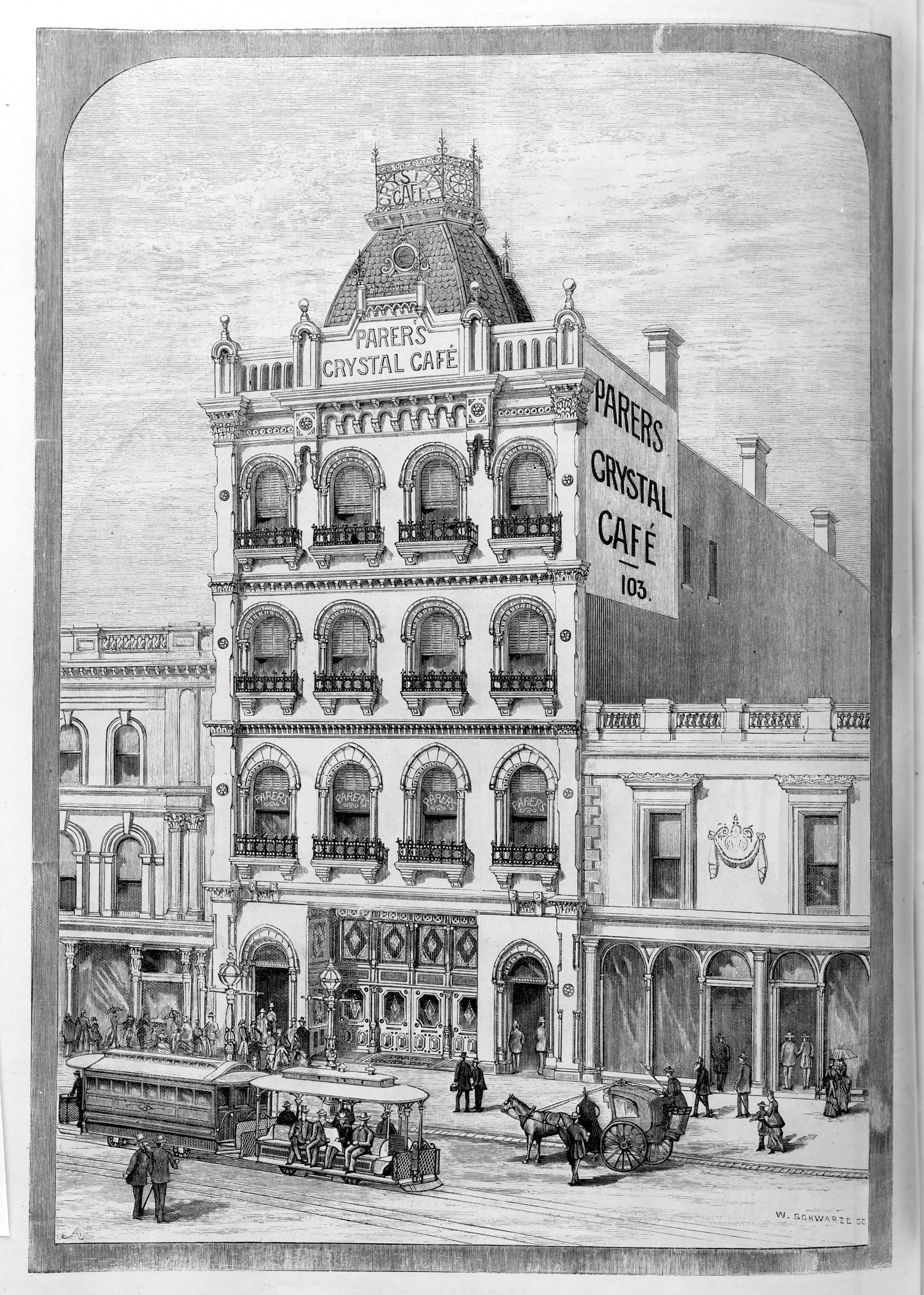
Parer's Crystal Café Hotel in 1888

Five brothers who immigrated to Australia from Catalonia in the 1850s, Juan, Felipe, and Estevan Parer, built Parer's Crystal Café and Hotel on Bourke Street, near Swanston, in 1886. The hotel featured billiard rooms, a café, clubrooms, a saloon, and lavish dining rooms. It had a staff of eighty and hotel rooms that accommodated more than 650 guests, but it was the extensive dining, bar and cafe rooms that set Parer's apart from other hotels. Leavitt's Guide wrote, "Its wealth of mirrors so fantastically arranged, its tessellated floor, glittering tables, refreshing fountains and artistic draperies, remind one of the magnificent structures of a similar kind which grace the capitals of Europe and America." Some of the Parer family continued to be involved in the business possibly right up to its sale in 1951, when it became Usher's Hotel.

Nearly ten years later, when Victorian era hotels and dining rooms were considered completely out of date, it was sold again, and demolished by Whelan's in October 1960. The site remained vacant until the Midcity Village Cinemas were built in 1970.

==== Queen's Coffee Palace (1888–1970) ====
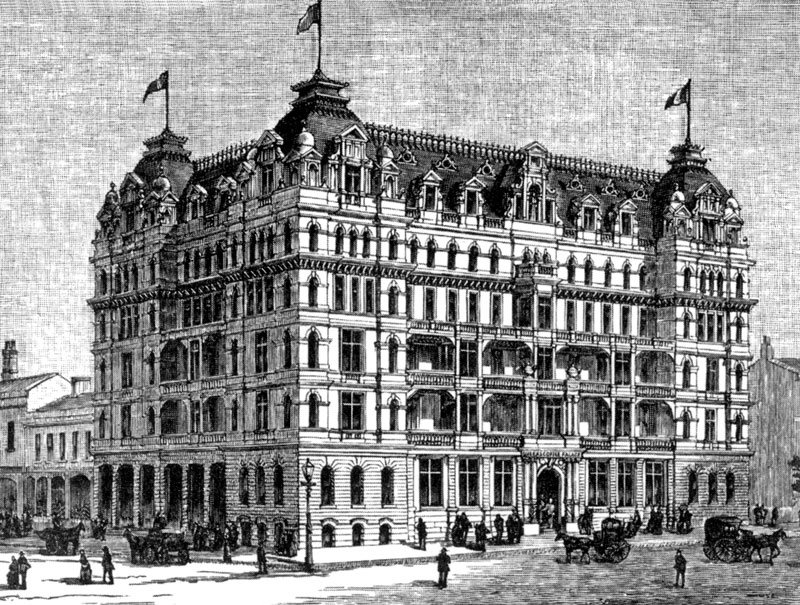
Queen's Coffee Palace design, 1888

Queen's Coffee Palace was one of the largest and most imposing coffee palaces in Melbourne after the Federal and the Grand (later the Windsor), however it never opened as such.

The Queen's Coffee Palace Company raised £30,000 in September 1887 to construct a large hotel with 350 bedrooms on the corner of Rathdowne and Victoria Streets, Carlton, facing the Carlton Gardens. Designed by Oakden, Addison & Kemp in German Renaissance style, the investors hoped to capitalise on the Melbourne Centennial Exhibition at the Royal Exhibition Building opposite, planned to open in August 1888. A partial collapse of the cornice during construction was followed by the insolvency of the contractor, and it failed to open before the Exhibition closed in March 1889. A dispute with a neighbour, and the insolvency of a major investor in 1889, led to further delays. A proposal for the government to purchase it for a hospital did not eventuate, and in 1890 it remained unfinished.

Tenders were called in 1898 to complete the building which was then used as 'residential chambers', and in 1929 it was purchased by the Catholic Church to become St Anne's girls hostel. In the 1960s, the impressive mansard roof was removed, apparently due to fire damage, and it was demolished in 1970, replaced by a small office building. From 1984 to 2013 it was the headquarters of the Cancer Council, remaining vacant in 2022, described as "city's worst eyesore".

==== Scott's Hotel (1912–1964) ====
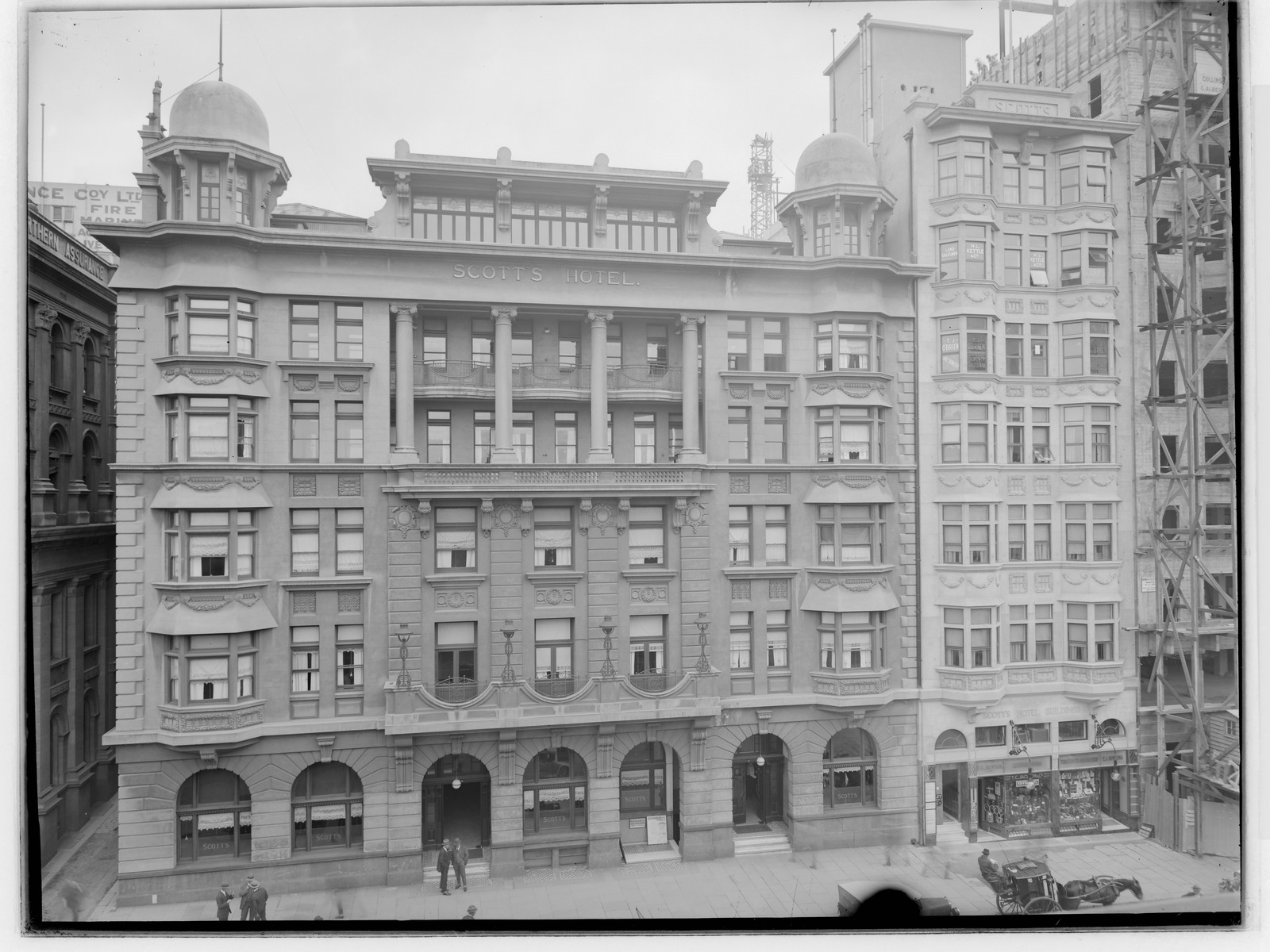
Scotts Hotel, 1925.

This hotel at 444 Collins Street began as the Lamb Inn in 1852, and was rebuilt as the much grander Scott's Hotel in 1860. It was rebuilt again as a much taller modern hotel in 1914, designed by AH Fisher, and extended to the east in 1923. Scott's Hotel was a rival for well healed guests with Melbourne's other established fine hotels, the Menzies and the Grand, later Windsor Hotel. It was particularly popular with country visitors, and race horse owners and breeders, and was the location for pastoral property auctions. Known for fine food and cellar, notable guests included Dame Nellie Melba and English cricket legend WG Grace. Like the other older hotels, by the 1960s it was losing custom to modern hotels and motels, and as the site was at the business end of the city, it was sold in 1962 to Royal Insurance, demolished in 1964 for their new office building.

==== Southern Cross Hotel (1962–2003) ====
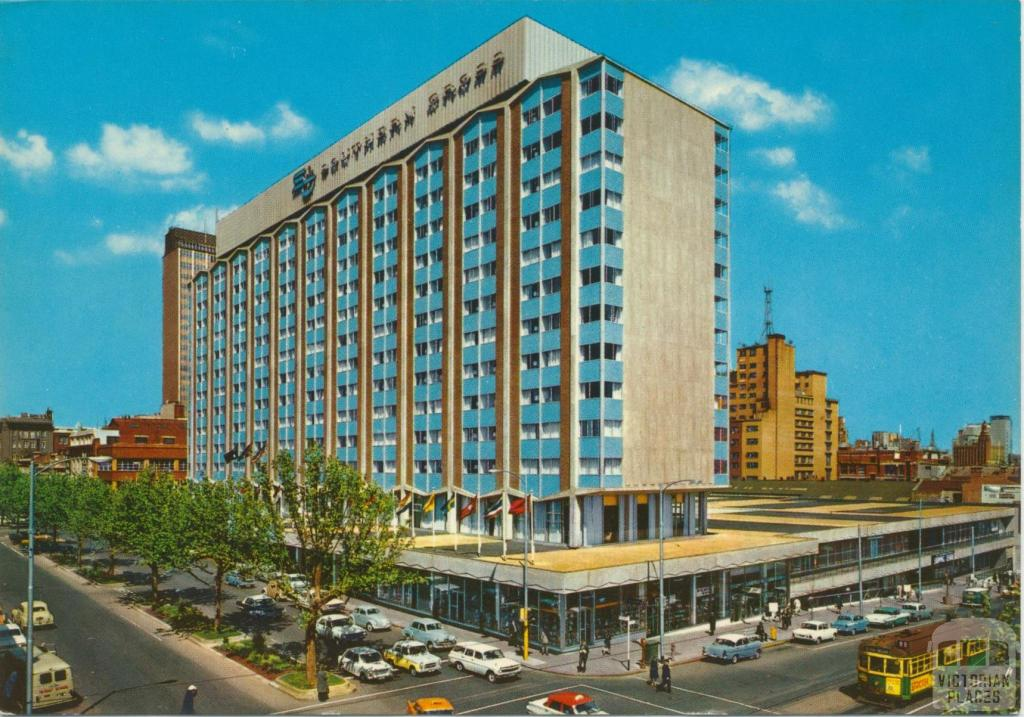
Southern Cross Hotel c1963

In the late 1950s, the City of Melbourne decided to find a better use for the site of their mostly vacant Eastern Market. A deal was brokered where a local consortium would build the hotel, leasing the land from the council for 99 years, while InterContinental would provide management. Demolition commenced in 1960, and the new Southern Cross Hotel, designed by Los Angeles architects Welton Becket & Associates, with local architects Leslie M. Perrot & Partners, opened in 1962. It was an immediate success, attracting the growing international 'jet set', and many famous guests, notably the Beatles in 1964, when crowds blocked traffic outside the hotel. The large ballroom hosted many important events, including such significant occasions as the annual entertainment awards the Logies, and the ALF best and fairest award, the Brownlows, for many years. With new more luxurious hotels opening through the 1980s, it lost its premier position, and was sold in 1995 and closed in 1996 pending a redevelopment. The hotel however remained abandoned until it was finally demolished in 2003, replaced by the Southern Cross Tower office development.

=== Theatres ===
==== Theatre Royal (1872–1933) ====
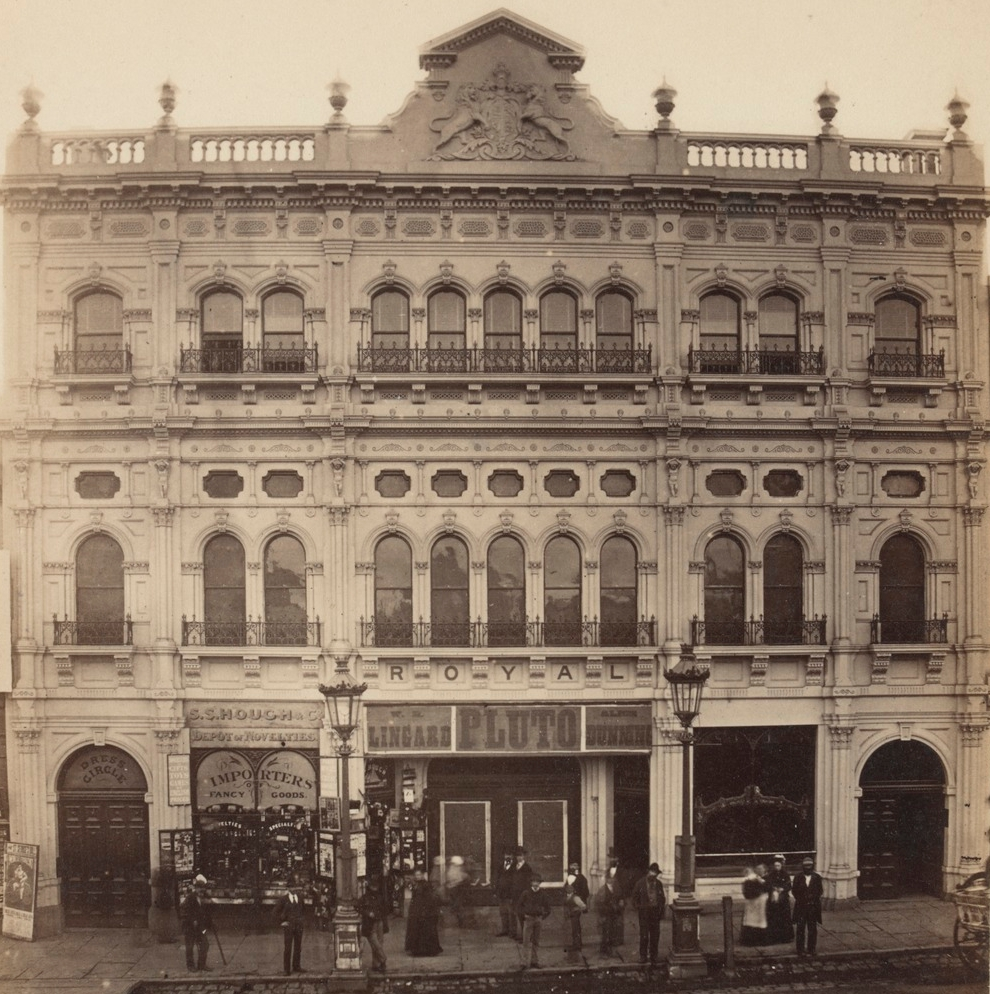
Theatre Royal, Bourke Street.

The Theatre Royal, first built in 1855 in Bourke Street near Swanston Street, was for much of its life the largest and most important theatres in Melbourne. The opening production on 16 July 1855 was Richard Sheridan's The School for Scandal. Described as a "magnificent theatre", it was built by John Melton Black, and could seat 3300 people, but the £60,000 cost ultimately bankrupted Black. Various lessees followed as it became Melbourne's principal theatre, settling with actor and theatre impresario George Coppin in 1867. After it was destroyed by fire in 1872, he immediately rebuilt it as an even larger venue that could seat 4,000 people over four tiers, designed by architect George Brown, which opened in November the same year, under joint management by Coppin, Stewart, Harwood and Hennings.

It was remodelled in 1904, seating fewer people more comfortably on three tiers, and in 1921 The Maid of the Mountains, one of the most popular contemporary musicals, had its Australian premiere at the Royal. Weathering the growing popularity of the movies, and the effects of the Great Depression, theatre organisation J C Wiliamson nevertheless announced plans in 1933 to rebuild Her Majesty's, and sold the Royal to Manton's, who planned a new department store for the site. A final performance took place on 17 November 1933, and demolishers moved in the next day.

==== Bijou Theatre (1890–1934) ====
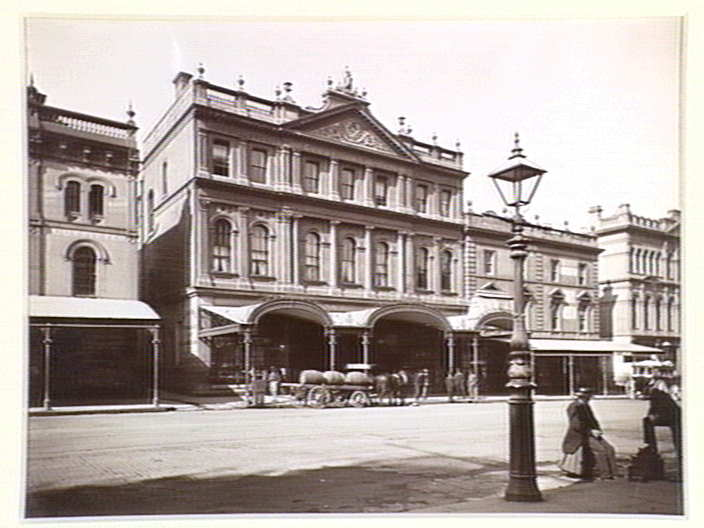
Bijou Theatre 1890 on Bourke Street near Swanston

The site of the Bijou was originally a theatre called the Academy of Music, built in 1876 and renamed the Bijou in 1880. The theatre itself was situated to the rear of the block, behind a long promenade / arcade, which the balcony crush room looked down into. In 1889 a fire destroyed the theatre portion, and immediately a new larger one was built, opening in 1890, which seated around 2,000 across three levels. The theatre was further renovated and altered in 1907. It was closed and demolished in 1934 by Whelan the Wrecker, a few months after the Royal, which stood opposite. The plan was to build a large new theatre and hotel complex, but this never eventuated.

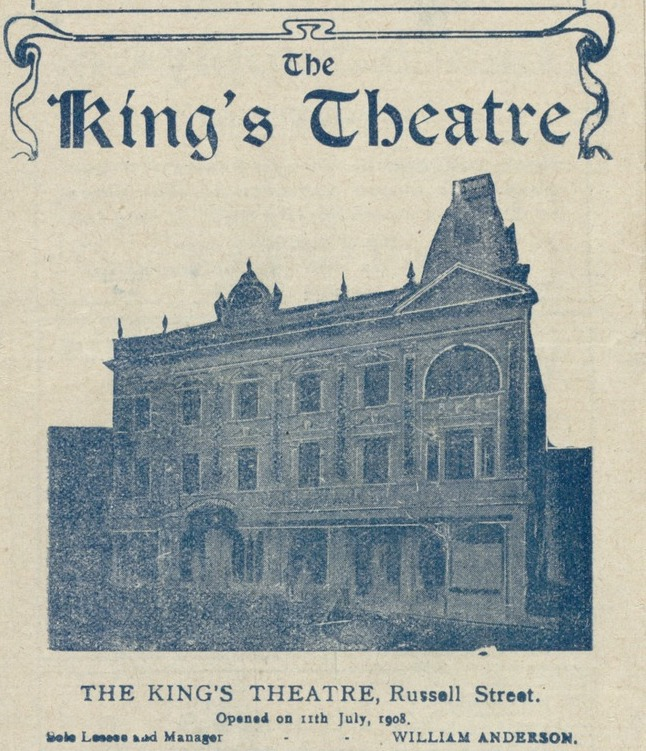
The King's Theatre Melbourne

==== Melbourne Opera House, later Tivoli Theatre (1901–1966) ====
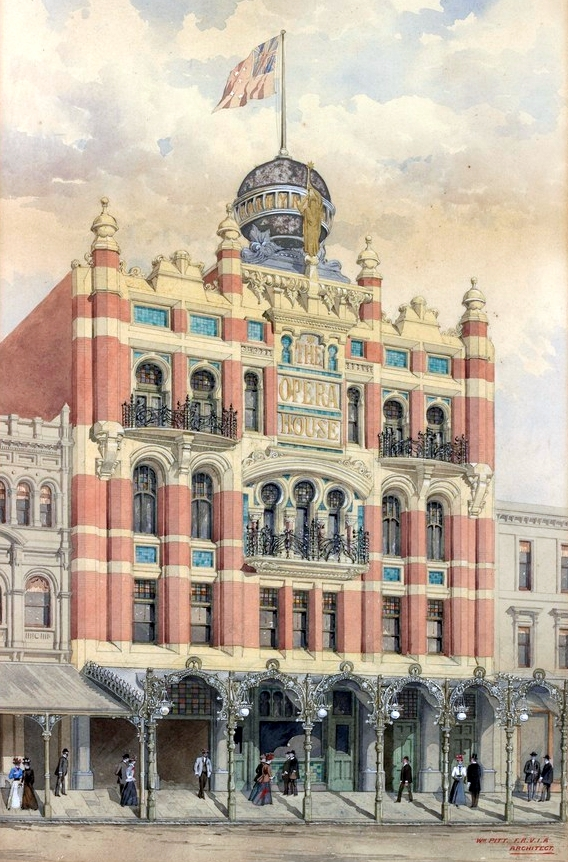
Opera House Melbourne, 1901

The Tivoli once stood on Bourke Street, quite close to Swanston Street, near the Royal and Bijou Theatres. Theatrical life began on the site in 1866 in the small Australia Hall, replaced in 1872 after a fire as the much grander Prince of Wales Opera House. In 1895, British actor-manager Harry Rickards, who already managed the Tivoli Theatre in Sydney, took over the lease, and in 1901 replaced it with a new theatre by architect William Pitt. It was designed in a broadly Edwardian style, with tall arches and red brick and cement render detailing, and included keyhole arches of the rarely used exotic Moorish style, and featured a landmark illuminated globe on the roof. The auditorium, over three levels, featured a more elaborate Moorish style decoration. In 1914, in line with the other venues on the Tivoli circuit, the New Opera House was renamed the Tivoli. By the 1950s the Tivoli circuit was famous for its scantily-clad chorus girls, who were colloquially known as "Tivoli tappers". In 1956 The Tivoli in Melbourne was refurbished in a padded streamlined style, the same year television was introduced into Australia, which quickly led to declining audiences, especially since variety performers became a mainstay of live broadcasts, and the theatre eventually closed in 1966. The theatre survived as a cinema for another few months, before being gutted by fire. The facade remained for several years until 1969 when it, along with the neighbouring Lyceum Theatre was demolished to make way the Tivoli Court office building at 235 Bourke Street, incorporating the ground level retail area known as Tivoli arcade, completed in 1971.

As Brennan's Amphitheatre, 1912

==== Kings Theatre (1908–1977) ====
Kings Theatre was located at 133 Russell Street between Bourke Street and Little Collins Street. Opening in 1908, the theatre was designed by William Pitt in the Second Empire style for the theatrical entrepreneur William Anderson. It was a popular live theatre for the next few decades, part of the entertainment district along Bourke Street. From the early 1940s, films were also shown. The interior and the façade were completely remodeled in streamlined modern style for the owner Norman B. Rydge in 1958, and it was renamed the Barclay Theatre, opening as a full-time cinema with Cecil B. DeMille's The Ten Commandments. The last film shown was One Flew Over the Cuckoo's Nest in 1975, before it was demolished and replaced by the six-screen Greater Union Russell Cinemas, which was itself demolished in 2014.

==== Palace Theatre (1912–2020) ====
Located at 20–30 Bourke Street, the first theatre on the site was Brennan's Amphitheatre, designed for circus-style performances in 1912, before being rebuilt as a live theatre in 1916. Renamed the Palace, the auditorium featured elaborate plasterwork and two rows of double boxes either side of the proscenium, designed by theatre specialist Heny White. White also designed a remodeling in 1923 in a more restrained Adamesque style. In 1951 it became a full time cinema, known as the Metro, with a Moderne restyling of the facade, and the proscenium and side boxes removed to allow for Cinemascope. After a period as a church, it was refurbished as a nightclub in 1987, removing the seats but retaining the elaborate plasterwork. Sold in 2012, plans to replace it with a tall hotel generated considerable opposition, but without any protections for the interiors, all decorative detail was removed in 2014. Further demolition in 2020 left only the 1951 street facade, with a much lower hotel opening in 2024.

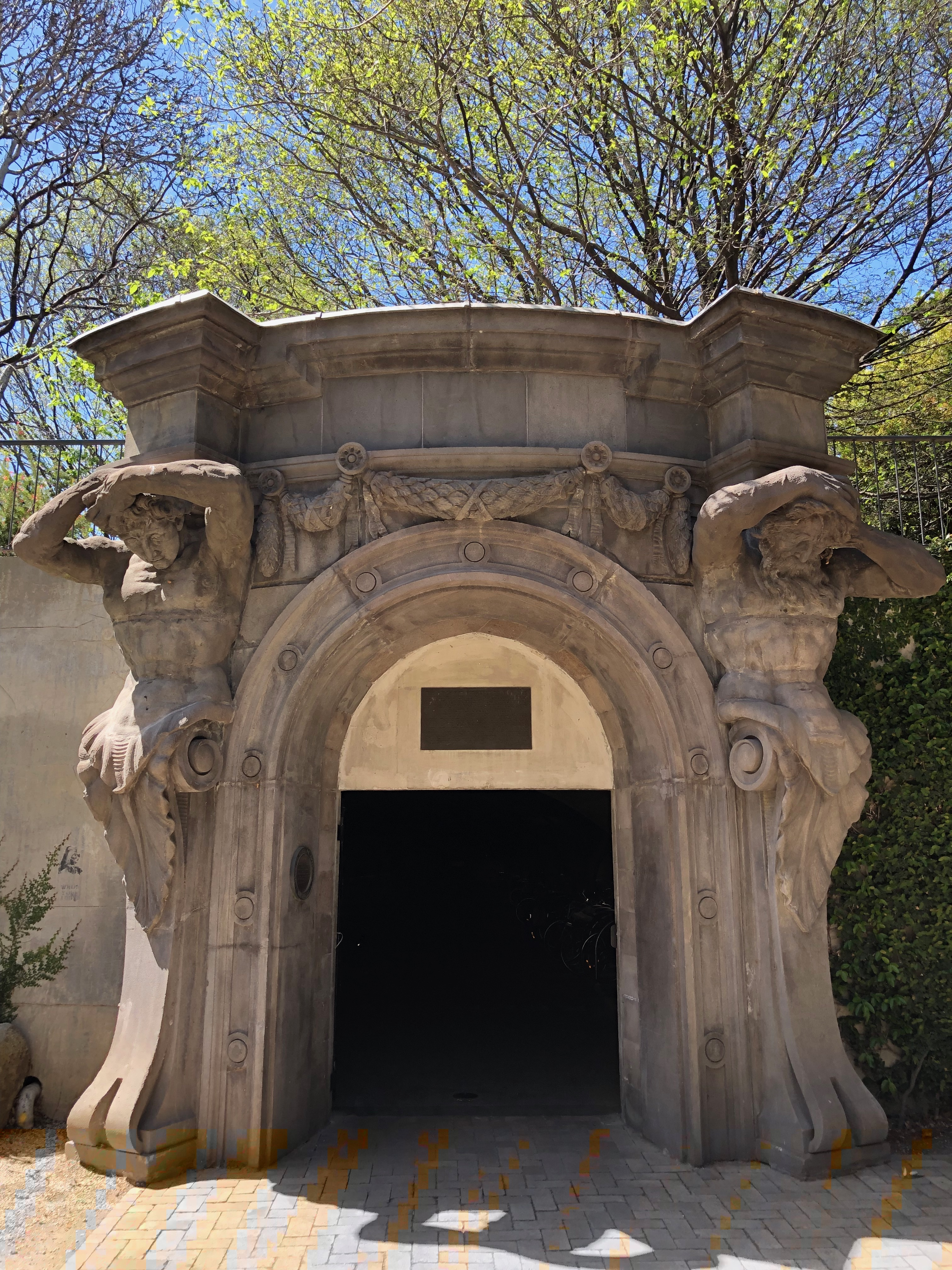
Colonial Bank entry at the Melbourne University carpark.

=== Banks ===
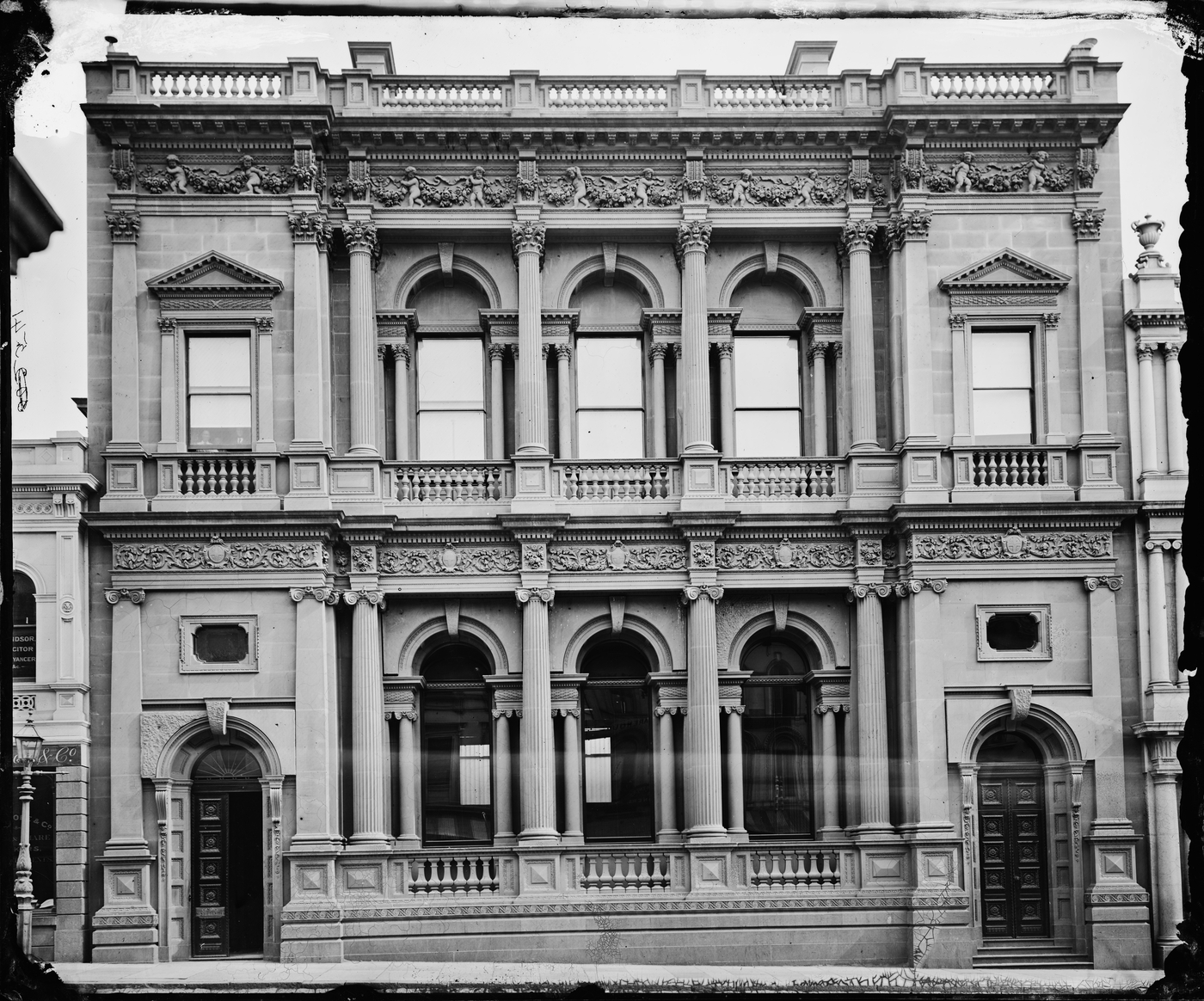
Bank of New South Wales, Collins Street, in the 1870s

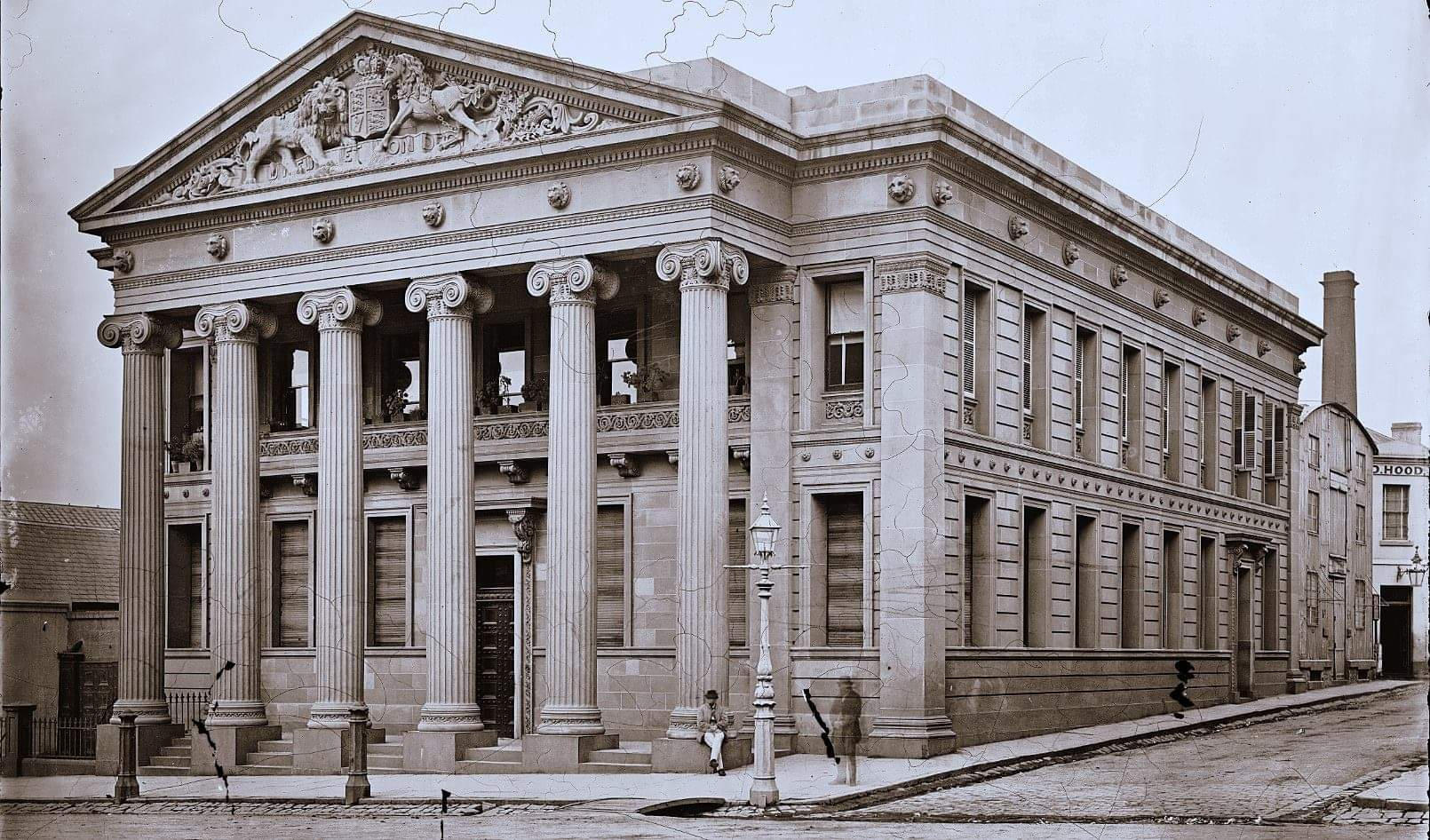
Oriental Bank in the 1870s

==== Bank of New South Wales (1857–1933–c.1975) ====
An elaborately detailed new headquarters for the Bank of New South Wales was built in 1857 at what was called 55 Collins Street West, designed by Joseph Reed in the Renaissance Revival style. In the early 1930s with plans for a much larger building, the bank gifted the facade to The University of Melbourne where it was re-erected in 1938, subsequently incorporated into the Melbourne School of Design building. On the same site, known as 368–374 Collins Street, a ten-storey Art Deco style building replaced it, designed by Godfrey & Spowers, completed in 1936, and won the Street Architecture Medal that year. The Art Deco building was demolished in the mid-1970s for Collins Wales House, located at 360 Collins Street.

==== Oriental Bank, Queen Street (1858–1888) ====
The Oriental Bank was built in 1858 at the southwest corner of Queen Street and Flinders Lane. Designed by Robertson and Hale, the grand Greek Revival facade was a landmark in the early city. Following a crisis in the parent company, this branch bank was closed in the early 1880s, and the building was demolished in 1888 for the third of Prell's nine-storey office towers.

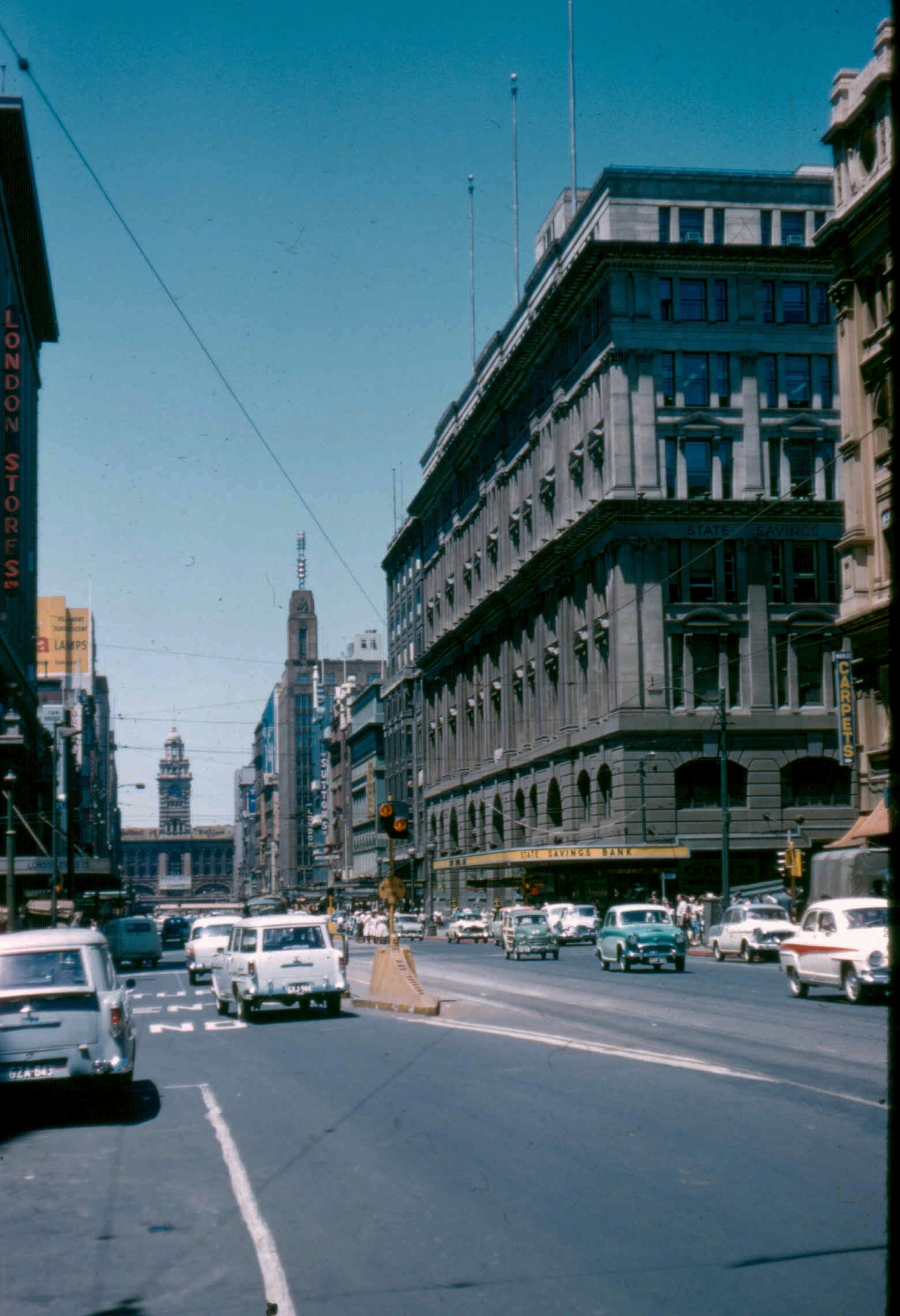
State Savings Bank of Victoria, c1959

==== Union Bank (1881–1966) ====
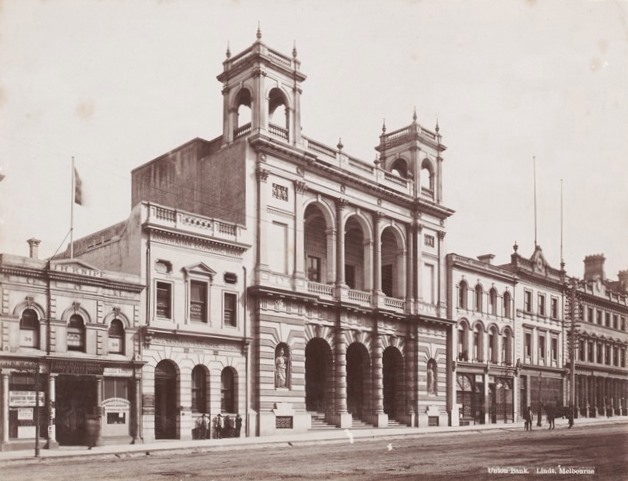
Union Bank in 1888

A grand new premises for the Union Bank of Australia was opened in late 1880 (at what is now 351 Collins Street). The facade was designed by English architect Macvicar Anderson, while the interiors were by local architects Smith & Johnson. The facade, in freestone and red and grey granite, featured deep arcaded loggias over two levels, flanked at ground level by niches containing statues representing Australia and Britannia (later known as Ada & Elsie). There was also a pair of open belvederes above the parapet, later replaced as part of works to create an additional floor. After the bank was taken over by the ANZ, demolition was proposed in the mid-1960s. Various ideas were floated for saving at least some of the stone facade, but all that was saved during demolition in 1966 were the two statues, and five broken capitals, installed at the then new Architecture School building at Melbourne University.

==== Colonial Bank of Australasia (1882–1932) ====
The headquarters for the Colonial Bank of Australasia was built in 1882 on corner of Elizabeth Street and Little Collins Street, a block away from the grand banking buildings of Collins Street. Designed by architects Smith & Johnson, it featured a rusticated base surmounted by a giant order of Corinthian columns, with an elaborate corner entrance. The bank was absorbed by the National Bank of Australasia in 1918, and the old headquarters was sold, and demolished 1932. The sculptural doorway was saved and re-erected at the University of Melbourne, at first on an existing faculty building, then relocated in the early 1970s as an entry to an underground carpark, itself now on the Victorian Heritage Register, along with the entry.

==== State Savings Bank of Victoria (1912–1975) ====
The head office of the State Savings Bank of Victoria was a large eight storey Commercial Palazzo style building, which began a modest classical style building in 1912 in Elizabeth Street, designed by Grainger & Little. It expanded twice, first by two floors and two bays in 1924, then in 1933–1935 it was extended up to the Bourke Street corner, to a design by Stephenson & Meldrum repeating the original architectural elements. The 1912 building had a spacious banking chamber occupying most of the ground level, which was retained and enlarged in the extension, with the Bourke Street corner occupied by shops. At eight floors with a prominent cornice, it complemented the style and scale of the London Stores, Cromwell buildings and GPO on the other three corners. The building was known by Melburnians and banking staff affectionately as 'Old Lizzy'. It was demolished in 1975 to make way for the 41-storey State Bank Centre completed in 1983.

=== Mansions ===
Through the boom of the 1870s and 1880s, the great personal wealth generated by the business community often resulted in the construction of very grand homes, ranging from extravagant mansions in extensive grounds, to merely quite elaborate large houses, usually with a tower, on larger suburban lots in the middle suburbs, and what were then the fringes of the city. Following the 1890s crash, many families could not longer sustain them, and some were put to other uses such as guest houses or schools, but beginning as early as the 1910s, many were demolished to make way for smaller lot subdivisions, a trend which accelerated in the post WW2 years. A full list would included many dozens, so a small selection of the most outstanding is given here.

==== Cliveden Mansions (1887–1968) ====
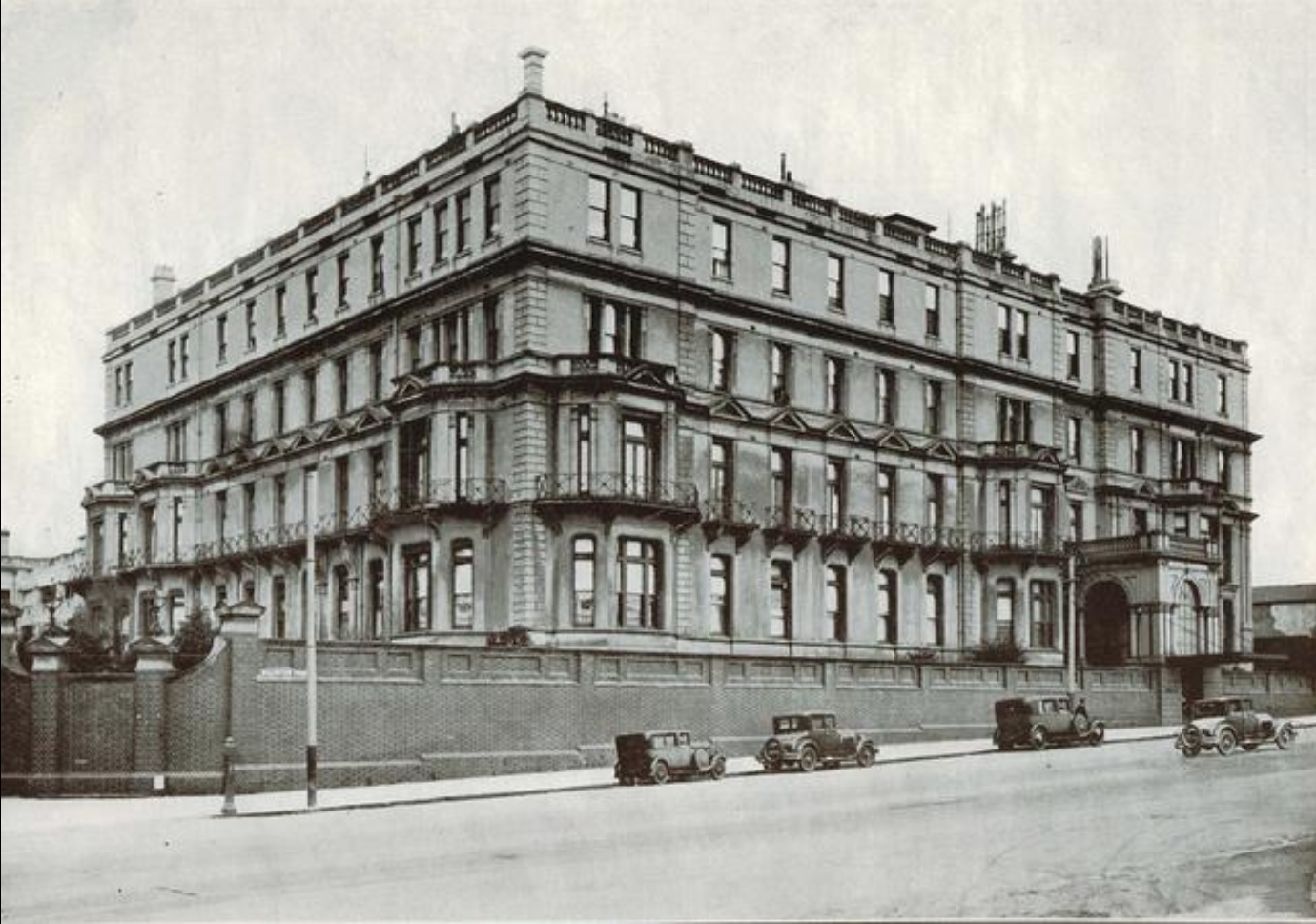
Cliveden Mansions c1930

Built in 1887 for pastoralist and businessman Sir William Clarke, Cliveden was probably the largest private house ever built in Melbourne, with 28 bedrooms, five bathrooms, 17 servant rooms, and a ballroom that could fit 250 guests. Designed by William Wardell in Renaissance Revival style, the interior featured elaborate woodwork in the Queen Anne style. It was located on a prominent site very close to the city on the corner of Wellington Parade and Clarendon Street, East Melbourne. After Lady Clarke's death, in 1909 a floor was added and it was converted into 48 luxury apartments, a new idea in Melbourne, though they were not all self-contained, with a central kitchen that could deliver meals, and a communal dining room. It was sold and demolished in 1968 to make way for the city's first Hilton Hotel, with some interior elements reused in the 'Cliveden Room'; they were sold off in 2018, and a large stained glass window and a pair of elaborate doors were purchased by the National Gallery Victoria.

==== Norwood (1892–1955) ====
In the middle of large grounds on the Brighton foreshore, financier Mark Moss built one of the most extraordinary mansions in Melbourne. Built in 1891–92 and designed by local architect Phillip Treeby, it was a towered red brick mansion in the Queen Anne /Elizabethan style, with a dash of American Romanesque Revival. The interiors were highly elaborate, with a baronial style hall, complete with a richly carved staircase, bronze knights and stained glass windows, with a billiard room above, a large ballroom, a dining room with a huge over-mantel, opening into a conservatory, and a marble Roman bath, in a fully tiled bathroom. Architect and critic Robin Boyd described it in 1955 as ‘so terrible that it is good’, but also ‘a fairy tale castle’. Moss lost his fortune and the house in the 1890s crash, selling it in 1894, eventually passing to the Johnson family, who sold it in 1955, when it was demolished. A 2013 booklet self published by Roland Johnson contains the most complete description and photographic record.

==== Byram / Tara Hall (1888–1960) ====
Built for industrialist George Ramsden on a large estate on Studley Park Road in Kew, Goathland was a very elaborate essay in the Queen Anne style, influenced by the United States Stick Style, designed by EG Kilburn. It featured three storeys under high gabled roofs, tall chimneys and a port cochere, with a huge large stairhall. The Ramsdens sold in 1902, when it was renamed Goathlands, then a series of owners and a name change to Tara Hall, finally becoming a nurses hostel in 1946. Sold in 1960, it was demolished and the site subdivided. It was extensively photographed in 1959/1960, with a collection held by the Kew Historical Society which can be found here.

=== Other ===
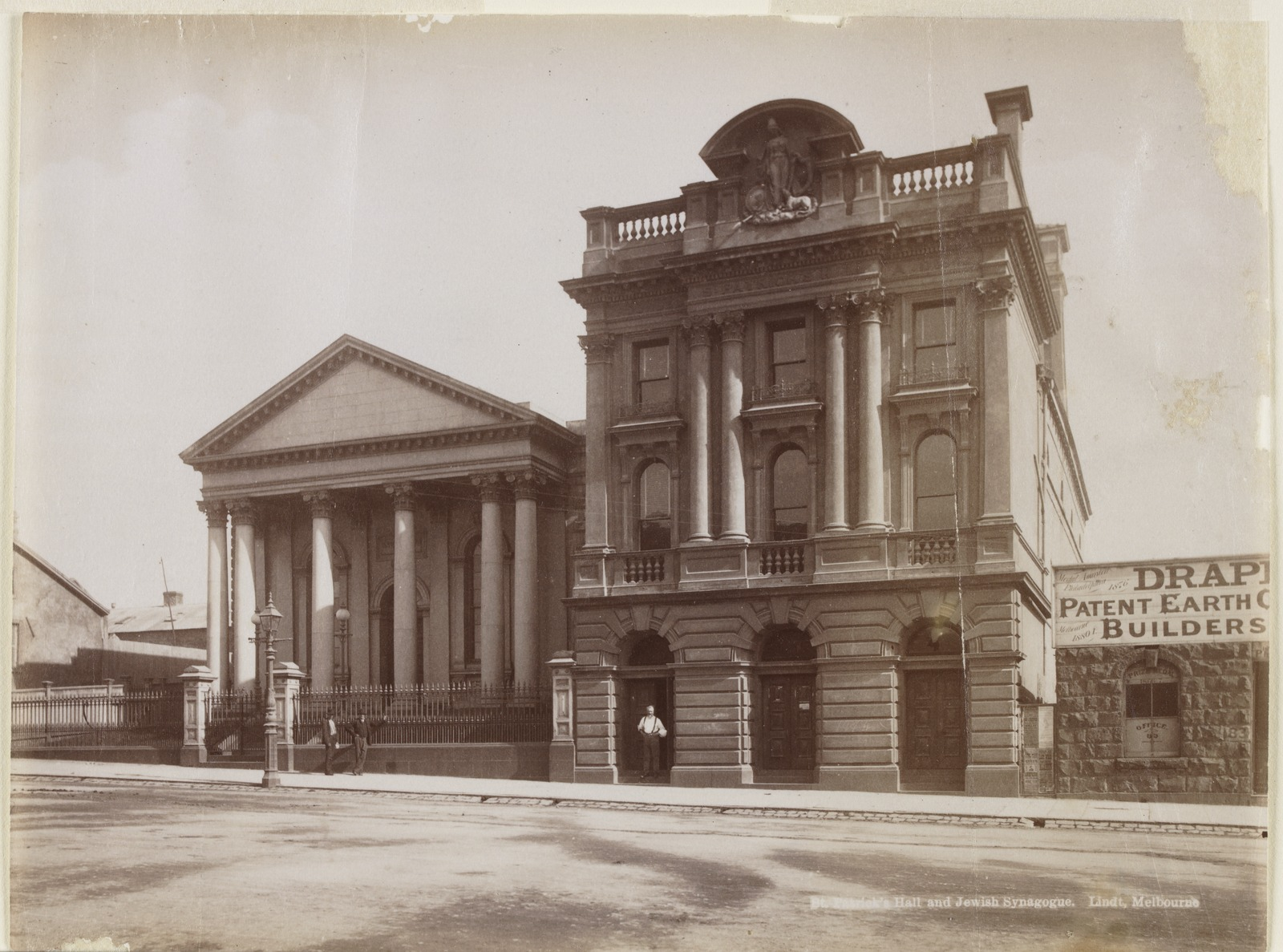
Melbourne Synagogue and St Patrick's Hall

==== Melbourne Hebrew Congregation Synagogue (1848–1929) ====
Located at the top of the Bourke Street hill near William Street (at no. 476), Melbourne's first synagogue started out as a small hall opening in 1848, which was replaced by a larger one with a grand columned portico designed by Charles Webb in 1854. The congregation built a much larger premises in Toorak Road, South Yarra, which opened in 1930, and the old synagogue was demolished for an office block the same year.

==== St Patrick's Hall (1849–1957) ====
Located at the top of the Bourke Street hill near William Street (at no. 470), St Patrick's Hall was built by the Irish Catholic community as one of Melbourne's first venues for meetings, events and balls, opening in 1849. Victoria's Legislative Council met there from 1851 until the opening of Parliament House in 1856, and a grand columned front was added in 1872. For many years it was a starting point for the St Patrick's Day procession and the Druids' Easter procession. It was demolished in 1957.

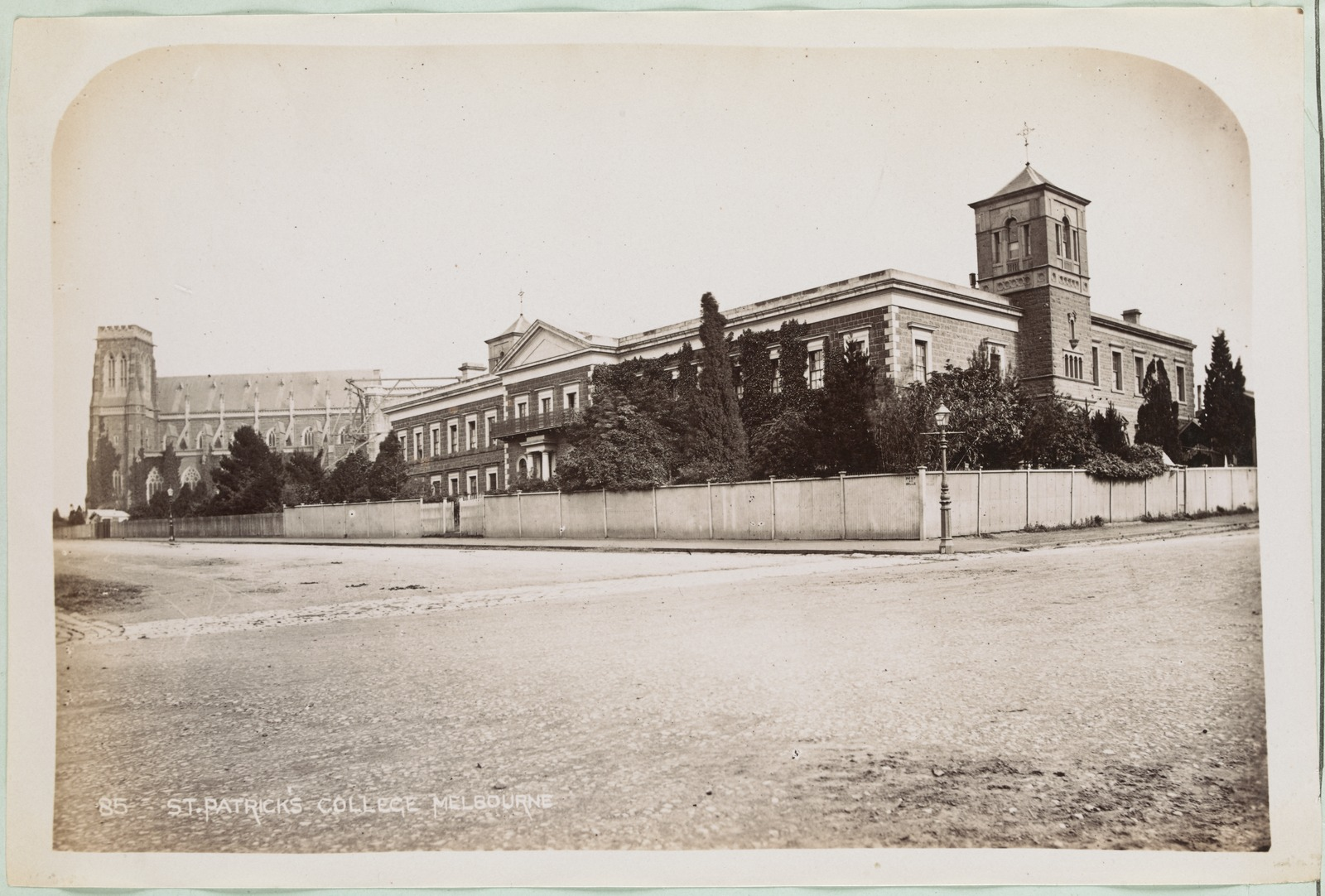
St Patrick's College from Lansdowne Street.

==== St Patrick's College (1854–1970) ====
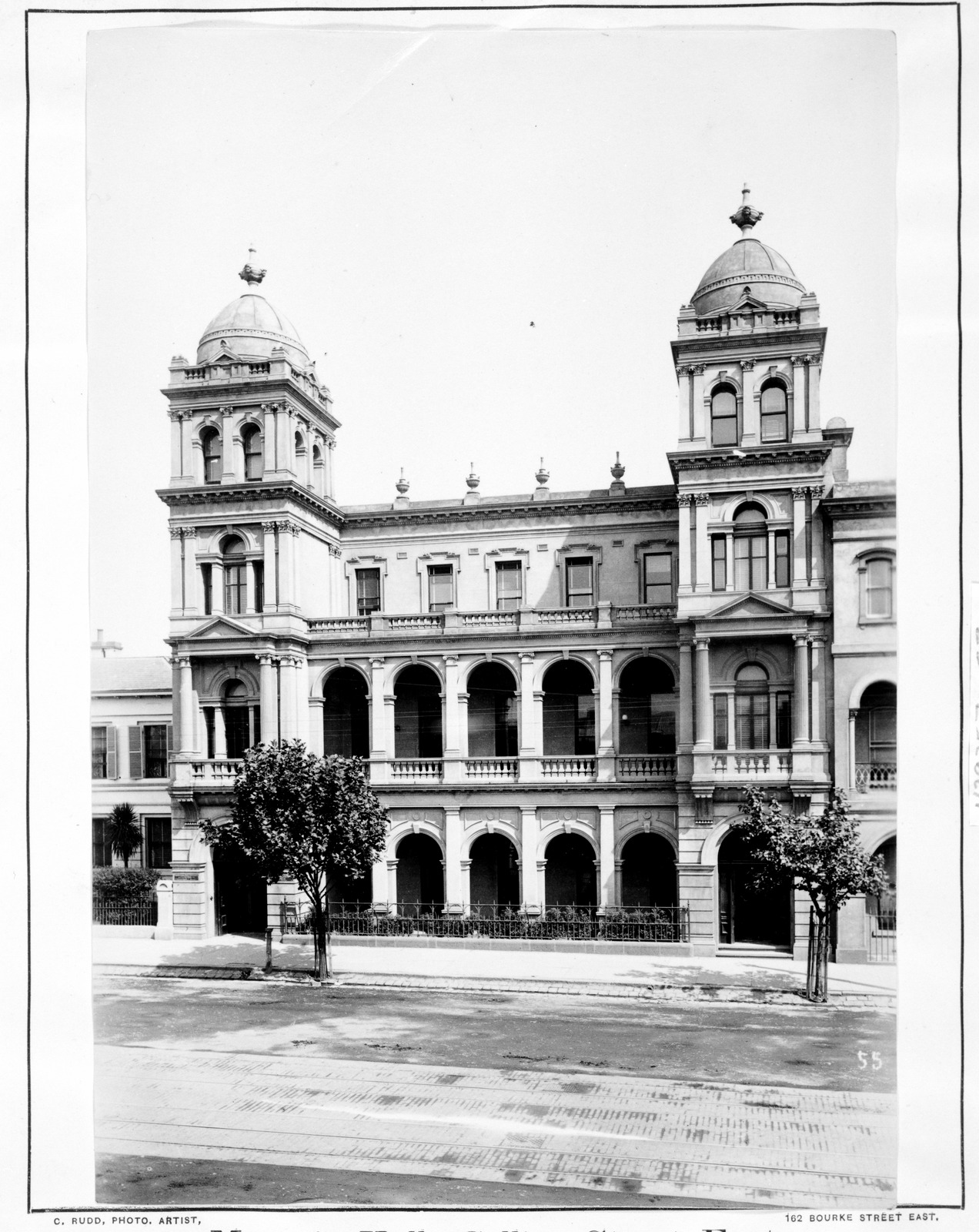
Masonic Hall, Collins Street

St Patrick College was built in 1854 in the grounds of St Patricks Cathedral, East Melbourne, facing Cathedral Place to the south. It was the second independent school and the first Catholic secondary school in Victoria. Unlike the Gothic Revival Cathedral, it was designed in a restrained Colonial Georgian style, with a central pediment, and fanciful towers at each end. Always a small school, it was nevertheless an important pillar of the intellectual and spiritual life of the Catholic community. The decision to close it in 1968 and demolish it for a Diocesan Centre was met with spirited resistance, particularly from by the National Trust, but to no avail. One tower was however left standing on the corner of Lansdowne Street and Cathedral Place.

==== Masonic Hall (1886–1971) ====
The Freemasons built a grand headquarters at the exclusive east end of Collins Street, which opened in 1887. Designed by John Grainger in the Renaissance Revival style, it featured twin domes, dining rooms and a large hall. In the 1920s the hall was refurbished as a ballroom. In 1969 the Masons moved to Dallas Brooks Hall in Albert Road, East Melbourne (itself demolished in 2016). The old hall was demolished along with many other surrounding buildings in 1971–72 for Collins Place.

==== St Kilda Sea Baths (1906–1926–1993) ====
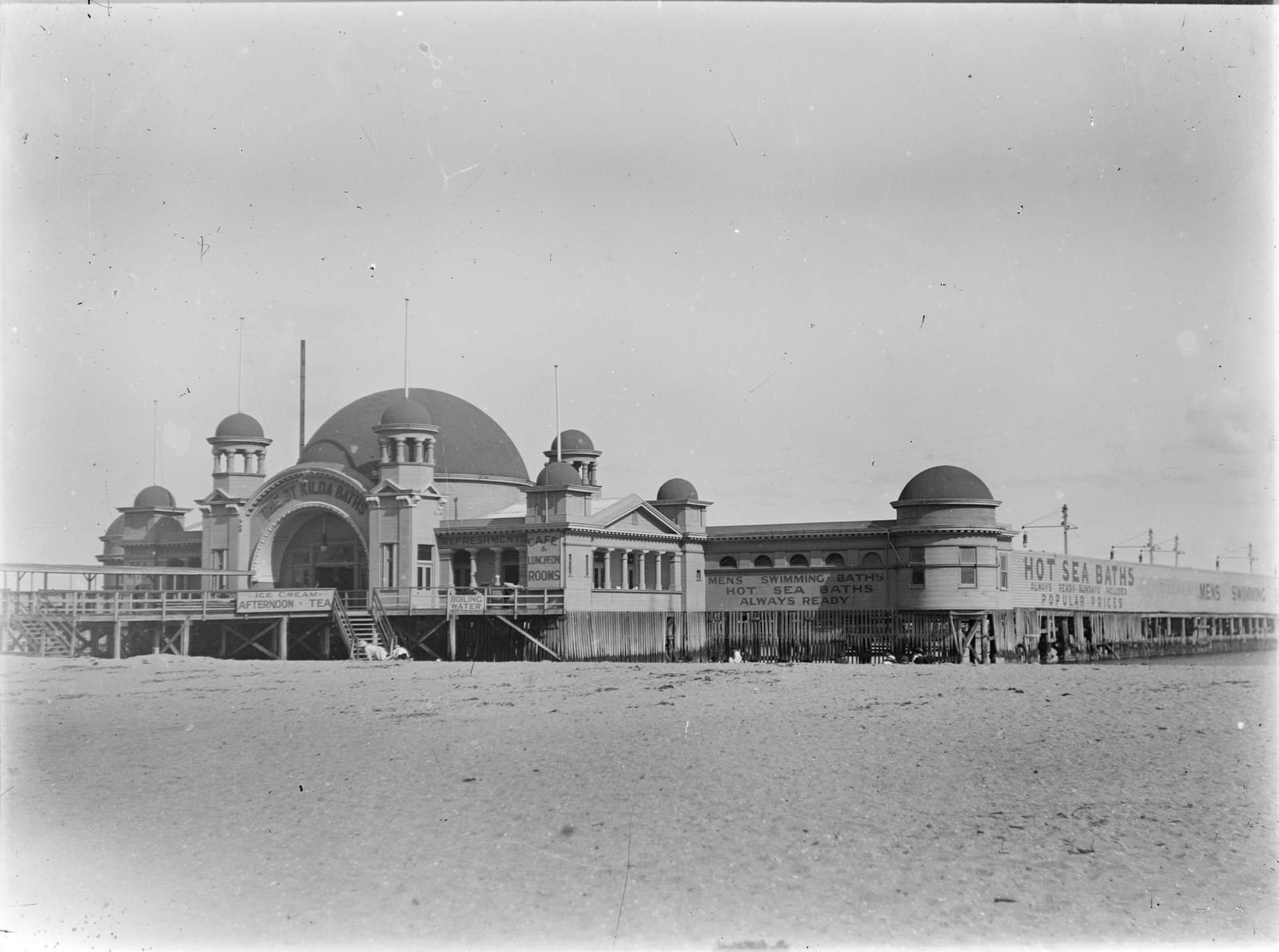
St Kilda Sea Baths c1910

Beginning in the 1850s. bathing in the waters of Port Phillip Bay usually took place in privately built enclosed structures, away from public view, which also had facilities for changing and sometimes other activities. The premier beach resort of St Kilda had up to four at once, providing facilities for ladies as well as men, and the grandest was simply called the St Kilda Sea Baths. Designed by Nahum Barnet, it was built in 1906, and featured a large domed pavilion and multiple smaller domes. The head building was destroyed by fire in 1925, and the whole baths was completely rebuilt by St Kilda Council in a Spanish style with twin domes, opening in 1931. It featured separate enclosures for men and women, and a head building that included hot sea bathing facilities and a cafe and nightclub, but lacking maintenance and custom, the sea bath enclosures were demolished by the 1980s. A redevelopment of the deteriorated main building in 1993 saw only the domes themselves retained, and the facade between reproducing the original, housing cafes facing the bay, and a larger section adjacent housing a new indoor pool.

==== Palais de Dance (1913–1969) ====
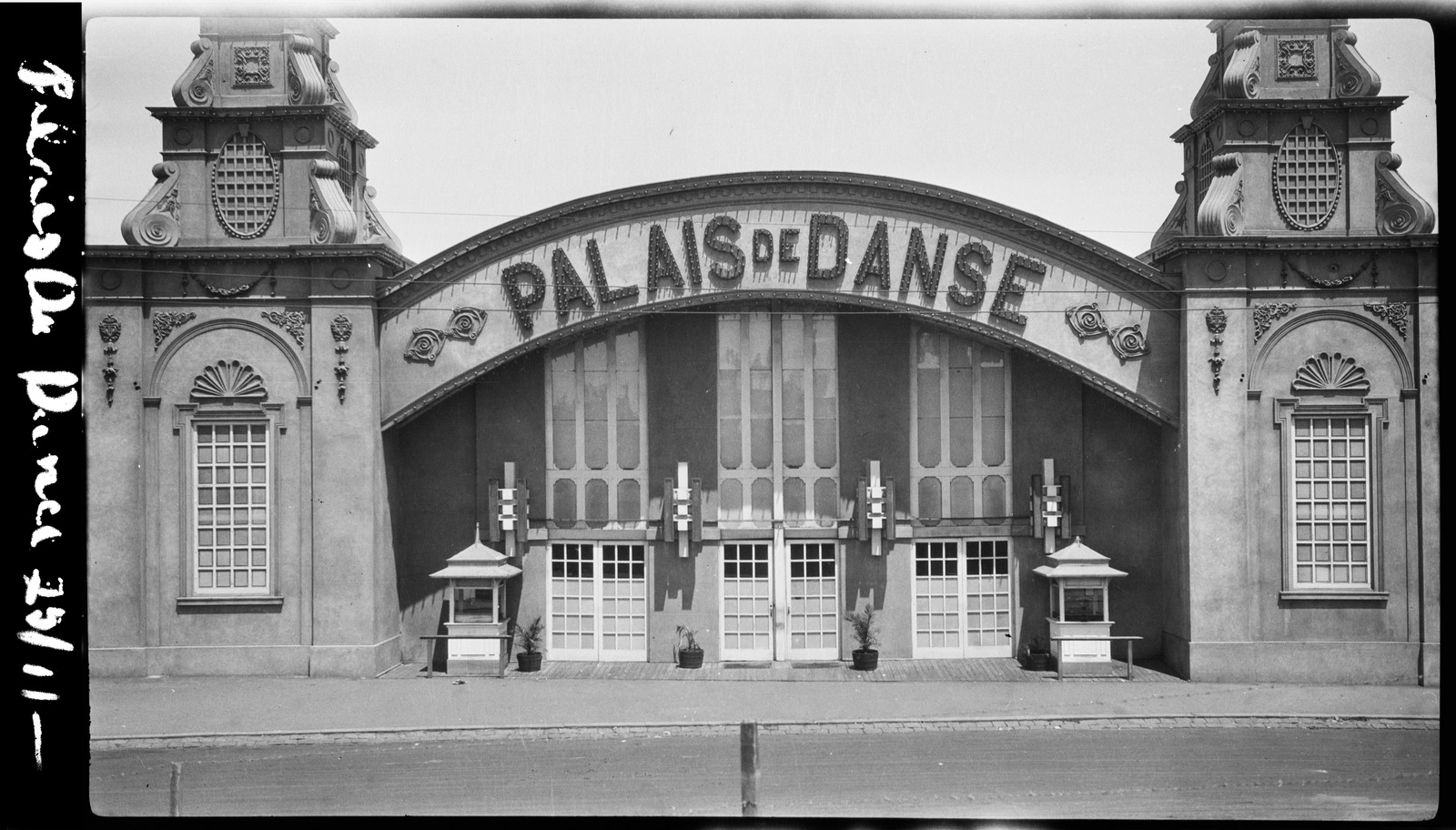
Palais De Danse c1930

The Palais de Danse was a large dance hall located next to the Palais Theatre on the foreshore of St Kilda, a beachside inner suburb of Melbourne, Victoria, Australia. Built in 1919, it featured remarkable geometric interior decoration, created in 1920 by the renowned architects Walter Burley Griffin and his wife, Marion Griffin, who had moved to Australia from Chicago after winning the competition to design Canberra in 1913. It was a popular entertainment venue throughout the early 20th century, until it was destroyed by fire in 1969.

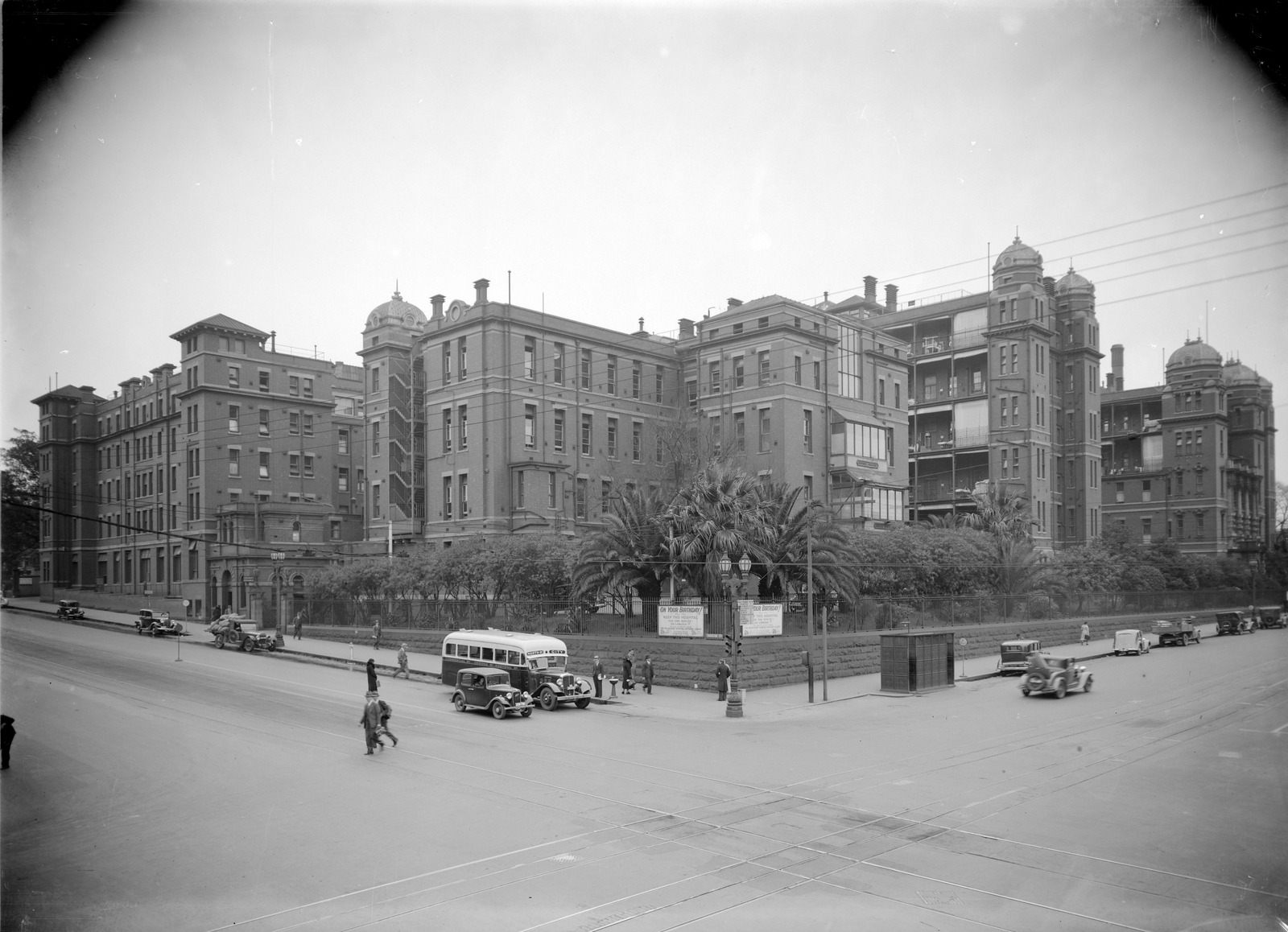
Queen Victoria Hospital, view from corner of Swanston and Lonsdale Streets, 1930s

==== Queen Victoria Hospital (1916–1994) ====
The block bounded by Swanston, Little Lonsdale, Russell and Lonsdale Streets in the city was reserved for a public hospital in the early planning of Melbourne, with the first facilities built in 1848 as Tudor style pavilions known as the Melbourne Hospital. Expanding gradually over time, the whole hospital was rebuilt in 1910–1916 in a red brick Edwardian style designed by architect John James Clark in partnership with his son EJ Clark. The hospital was composed of several five and six-storey pavilions or towers, including verandahs for patients to convalesce in the open air. Tudor domed cupolas topped the front corners of each tower.

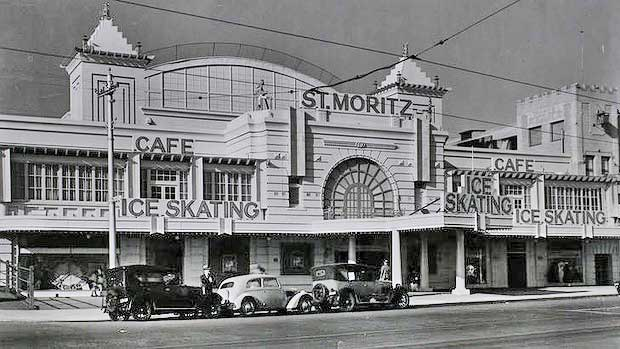
St Moritz Ice Rink, c1939

Renamed the Royal Melbourne Hospital in 1935, it relocated to a large new modern hospital in Parkville in 1944. The old buildings were then occupied by the Queen Victoria Hospital, first established 'by women for women' in 1896. The hospital closed in 1987, with plans for an expansion of the adjacent Museum and Library envisaging the retention of only the three main pavilions. Instead it was sold to property developer David Marriner in 1992, on-selling to the Government of Nauru six months later, who demolished everything but the three pavilions, and in 1994 then Planning Minister Rob Maclellan over-ruled the Historic Buildings Council allowing further demolition, preserving only the central pavilion. The site however remained vacant, reverting to the City of Melbourne in 1999, who engaged Grocon to develop the Queen Victoria Village, or QV, a complex of offices, apartments, and shops, with the remaining pavilion occupied by the Queen Victoria Women's centre.

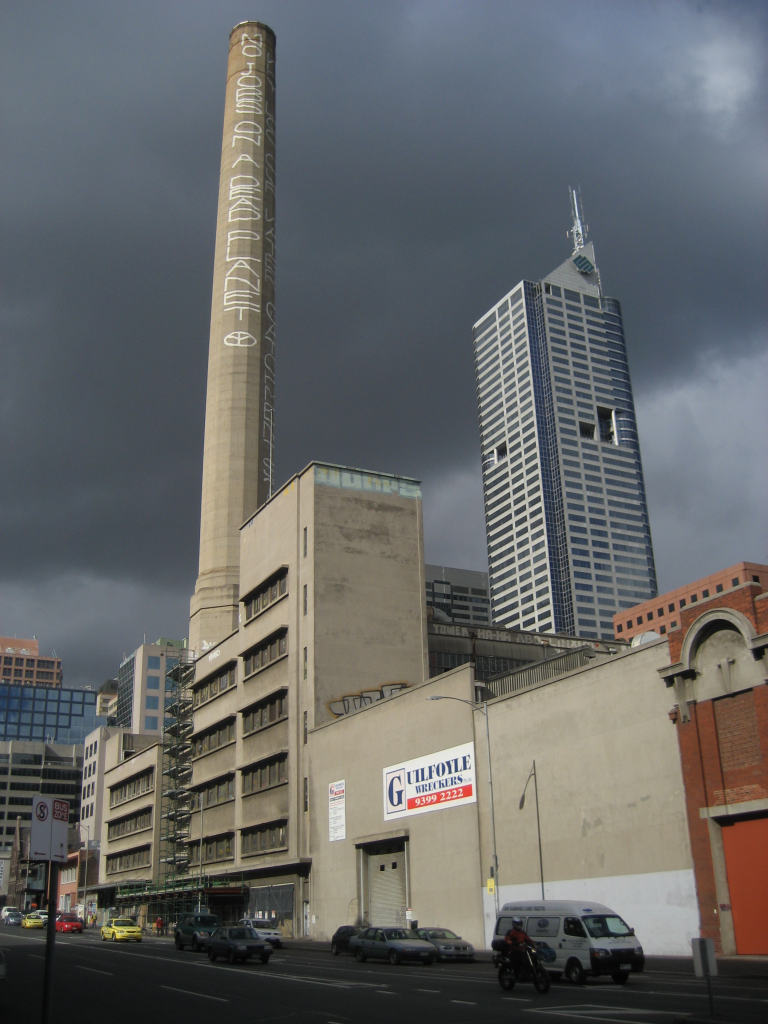
Spencer Street Power Station, Lonsdale Street side

==== St. Moritz Ice Rink (1923–1939–1982) ====
This landmark entertainment structure on The Esplanade, St. Kilda, was built as the Wattle Path Palais de Danse in 1923, designed by architects Beaver & Purnell featuring a wide arched roof and a pair of stepped top towers. Closed as a result of the depression, it was used as a film studio for some years after 1933. In 1939 it was renovated and reopened as St. Moritz Ice-skating Palais, and as one of only two ice rinks in Melbourne in the 40s and 50s, it played a central role to the sport of ice hockey in Australia. Sold to developers in 1980 amid declining patronage, it was closed in 1982, and soon suffered a major fire, and then was demolished. A neon skating figure was rescued, eventually finding a home at the St Kilda Town Hall. The site remained vacant until a mid-price hotel was constructed about 1991 called the St Moritz, itself demolished in 2019 for luxury apartment development, also called the St Moritz.

==== Spencer Street Power Station (1950s–2008) ====
In order to provide power for a new system of electric street lights, the City of Melbourne built a coal fired power station on the corner of Spencer Street and Little Bourke Street, opening in 1894. It was expanded and machinery upgraded many times, adding and altering buildings in 1907–08, and in the 1920s. Another expansion in the 1950s saw a new office section added to the station on the Lonsdale Street side, which included a tall reinforced concrete chimney, which became something of a landmark. By the 1960s the station was retained for peak use only, and closed in 1982. Following years of abandonment and being seen as an eyesore, the site was largely cleared in 2007–08, with the exception of the small Edwardian-era office building, and the Economiser Hall on Little Bourke Street. A four tower development with 2500 apartments known as Upper West Side was approved in 2010 and completed by 2016.
