= Sicu =

Sicu or SICU may refer to:

- Surgical intensive care unit
- Sicu (river) in Romania
- Siku (instrument)

== See also ==
- Sicus (disambiguation)
- Siku (disambiguation)
