= Marchionni =

Marchionni is an Italian surname. Notable people with the surname include:

- Bartolomeo Marchionni, Florentine merchant
- Carlo Marchionni (1702–1786), Italian architect
- Federica Marchionni (born 1971), Italian-American businesswoman
- Lorenzo Marchionni (born 1994), Italian footballer
- Marco Marchionni (born 1980), Italian footballer
- Roberto Marchionni (born 1965), pen name Menotti, Italian comic book artist and screenwriter
