= Collins Street, Melbourne =

Street in Melbourne, Victoria, Australia

Collins Street Victoria
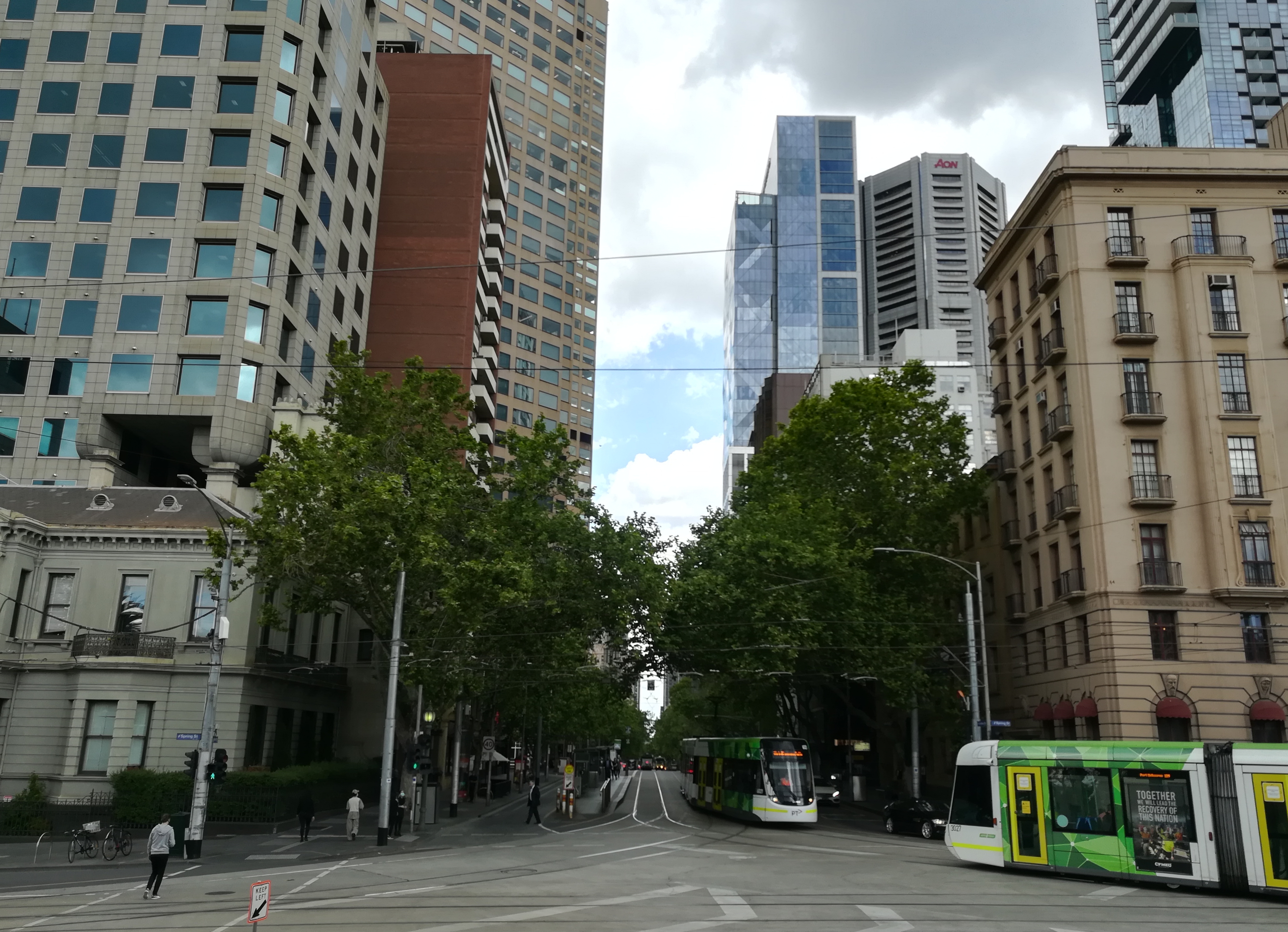
- Looking west down Collins Street from the Old Treasury Building, Spring Street
- Coordinates: 37.8168°S 144.9622°E

General information
- Type: Street
- Length: 3.2 km (2.0 mi)

Major junctions
- West end: North Wharf Road; Docklands, Melbourne
- Harbour Esplanade; Spencer Street; King Street; William Street; Queen Street; Elizabeth Street; Swanston Street; Russell Street; Exhibition Street; Spring Street
- East end: Macarthur Street; East Melbourne

Location(s)
- LGA(s): City of Melbourne
- Suburb(s): Docklands, Melbourne CBD

Collins Street is a major street in the central business district of Melbourne, Victoria, Australia. It was laid out in the first survey of Melbourne, the original 1837 Hoddle Grid, and soon became the most desired address in the city. Collins Street was named after Lieutenant-Governor of Tasmania David Collins who led a group of settlers in establishing a short-lived settlement at Sorrento in 1803.

The eastern end of Collins Street has been known colloquially as the 'Paris End' since the 1950s due to its numerous heritage buildings, old street trees, high-end shopping boutiques, and as the location for the first footpath cafes in the city. As with all main streets in the Melbourne city centre, the Hoddle Grid is exactly 99 feet wide which would allow for the installation of trams in 1885. Blocks further west centred around Queen Street became the financial heart of Melbourne in the 19th century, the preferred home of major banks and insurance companies, a tradition which continues today with the most prestigious office blocks and skyscrapers found along its length.

== History ==
=== 19th century ===
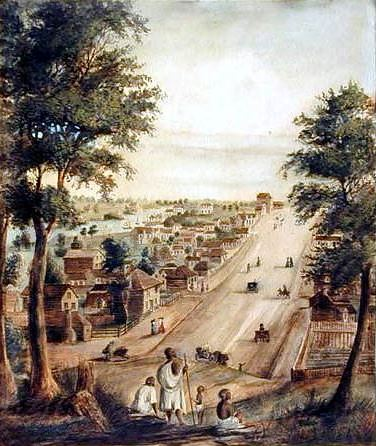
Wurundjeri people at Collins Street, 1839

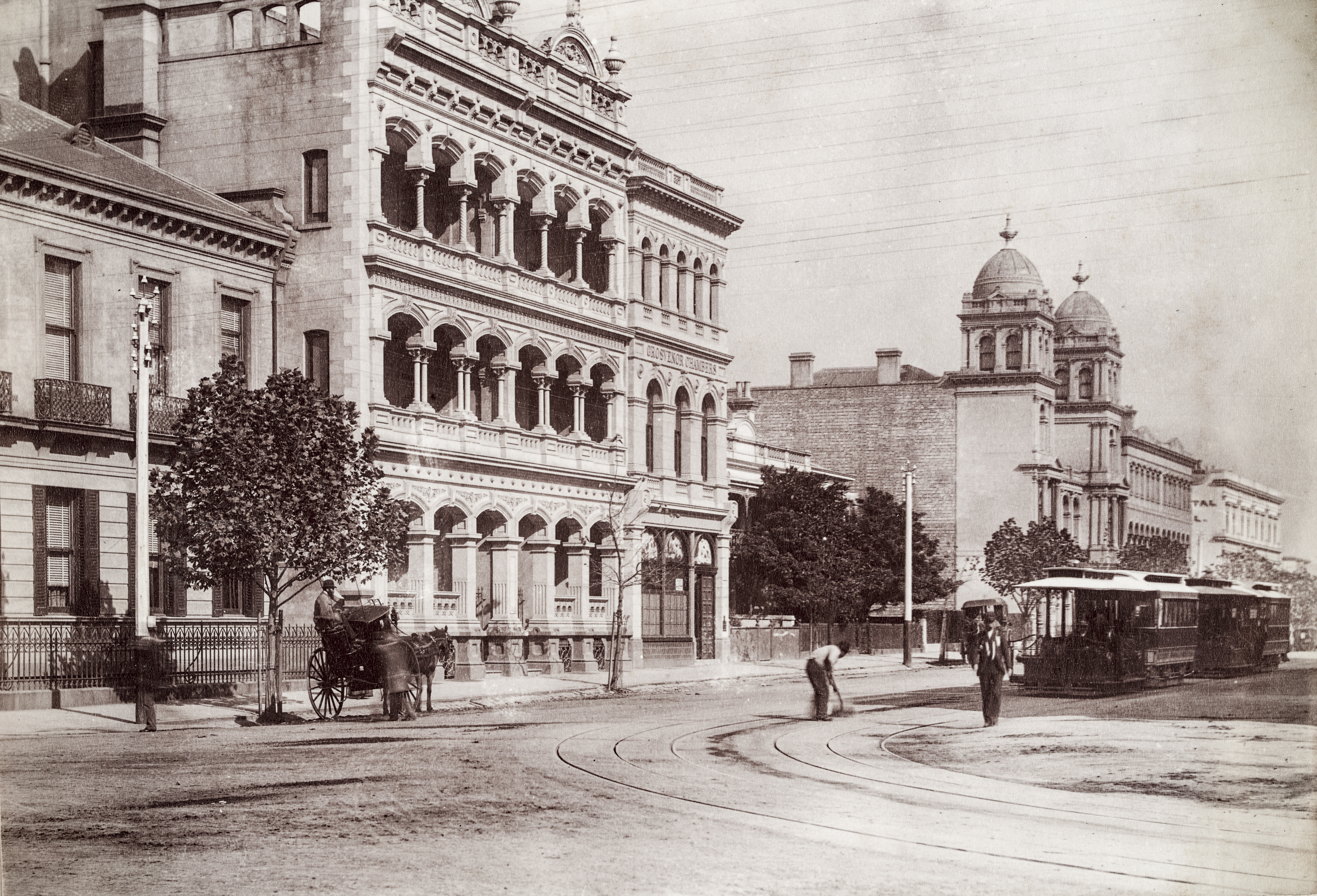
Collins Street (c.1880-1890) near the corner of Spring Street, showing Grosvenor Chambers at centre. Albumen silver photograph 14.0 x 20.0 cm. State Library of Victoria

As laid out by the surveyor Robert Hoddle, it was exactly one mile in length and one and half chains (99 feet (30 m)) wide. The street was named for Lieutenant-Governor David Collins who led a group of settlers in establishing a short-lived settlement at Sorrento on the Mornington Peninsula, south of Melbourne, in the early 19th century. He subsequently became the first governor of the colony of Van Diemen's Land, later to become the state of Tasmania. At the western end of the street was Batman's Hill, named for the Tasmanian adventurer and grazier John Batman, who built a house at the base in April 1836, where he lived until his death in 1839.

The first major street improvements were carried out in the mid-1850s, including bluestone curbs and gutters, and the introduction of gas lighting in 1855. The first street trees were elms, planted in 1875. A cable tram line was laid in 1886 and was operational until 1930 when it was electrified.

Throughout the late 19th and early 20th centuries, the top end of Collins Street, known as Collins Street East, was dominated by the rooms of medical professionals. The prestigious Melbourne Club was a dominant cultural presence after its founding in 1838. Collins Street was also the location of Grosvenor Chambers (9 Collins Street) which was Australia's first custom designed studio complex, and was used by many prominent Australian artists. With the development of the suburbs, doctors relocated from their residences, set back from the street by substantial gardens along Collins Street East (now known as the 'Paris End'), and shopfronts were built in place, including then department store Georges.

=== 20th century ===
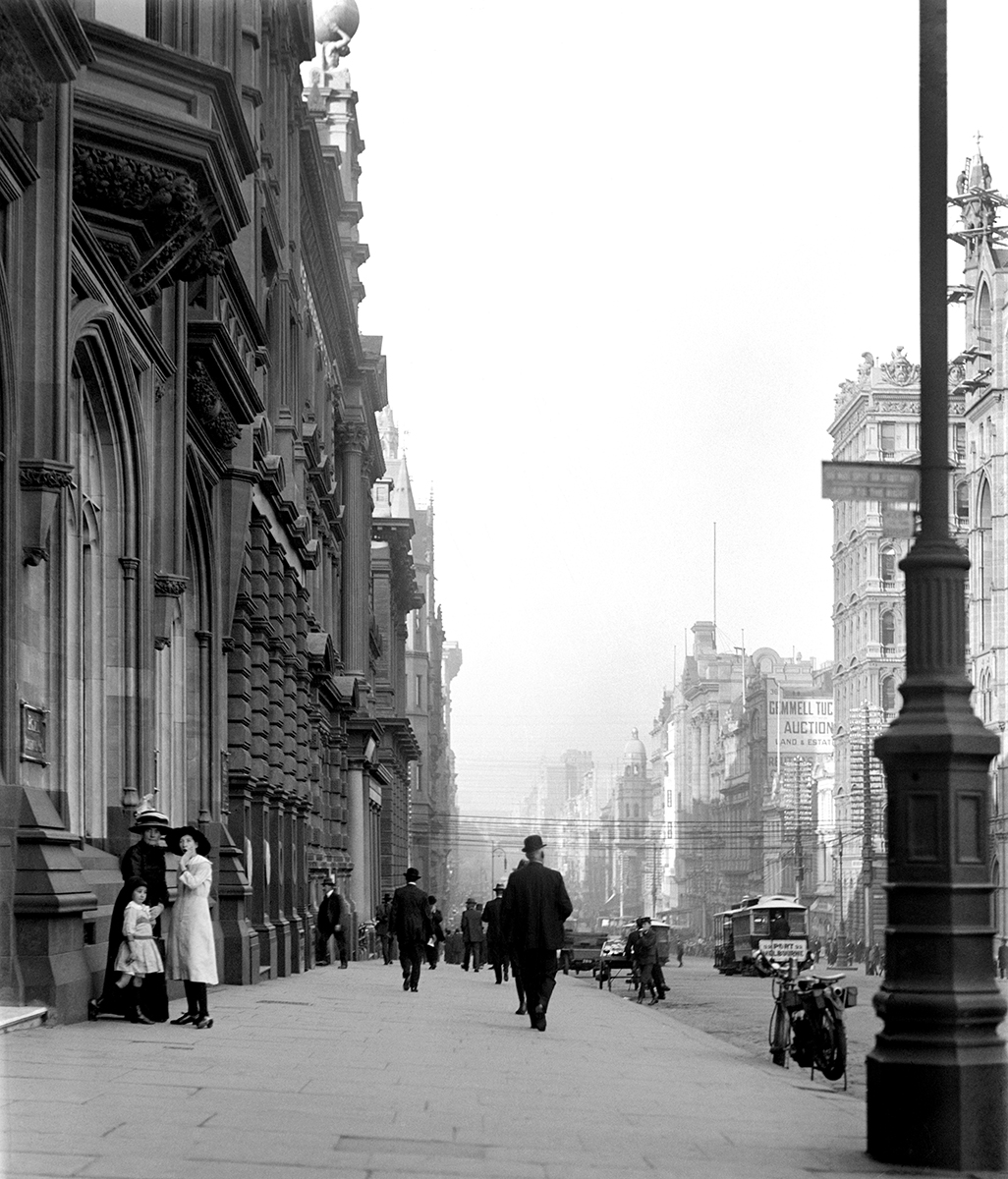
Collins Street, 1910

Around the turn of the 20th century "doing the Block," or walking around in one's finest clothing to be seen, became a pastime for shoppers at the Block Arcade in the retail heart of Collins Street, between Elizabeth and Swanston Streets.

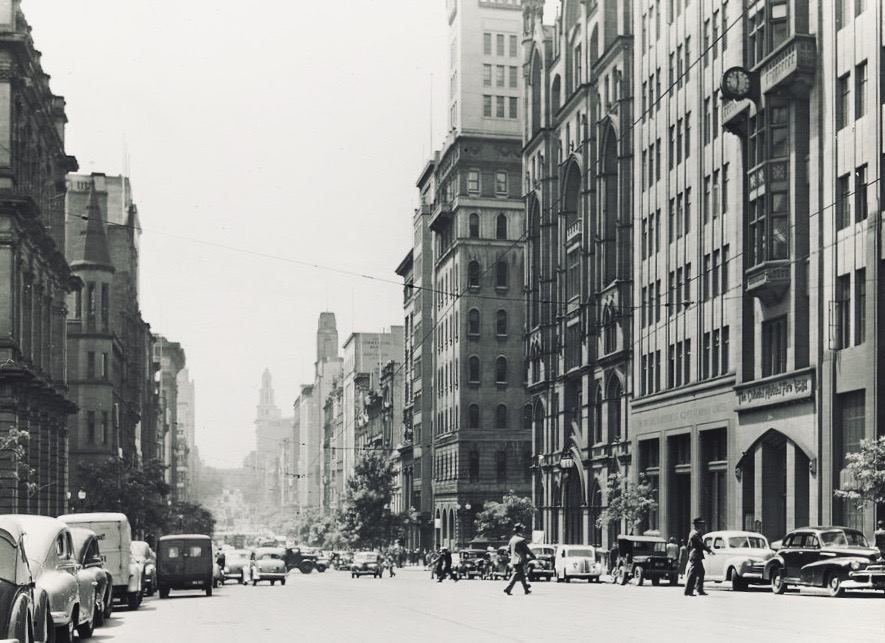
Collins Street, 1930s

During the 1950s and 1960s, the street became subject to extensive redevelopment and many historic buildings were demolished by Whelan the Wrecker, despite the efforts of the National Trust and the Save Collins Street group. While some examples of Boom Style architecture survive, the grandest examples were lost to the wrecker's ball. Of the major losses, the most significant were the large Victorian buildings including the Federal Coffee Palace, Colonial Mutual Life building, Robb's buildings, Queen Victoria Buildings, City of Melbourne Bank, Scott's Hotel, Melbourne Mansions and APA building. Many of the buildings destroyed in this era were documented by architectural photographer Mark Strizic and can be found in the archives of the State Library of Victoria.

One of the most popular public art statues in Melbourne, Larry La Trobe created by artist Pamela Irving, faces Collins Street from the northern end of Melbourne City Square.

=== 21st century ===
Between 2003 and 2005, Collins Street was extended west beyond its previous termination at Spencer Street, starting with the opening of the bridge over Southern Cross station and Wurundjeri Way on 18 December 2002, with the street ending outside the new ANZ and Myer headquarters further in the Docklands development. It has since been extended further west to create an intersection between Bourke Street and Collins Streets, two of Melbourne's most important streets.

== Architecture ==
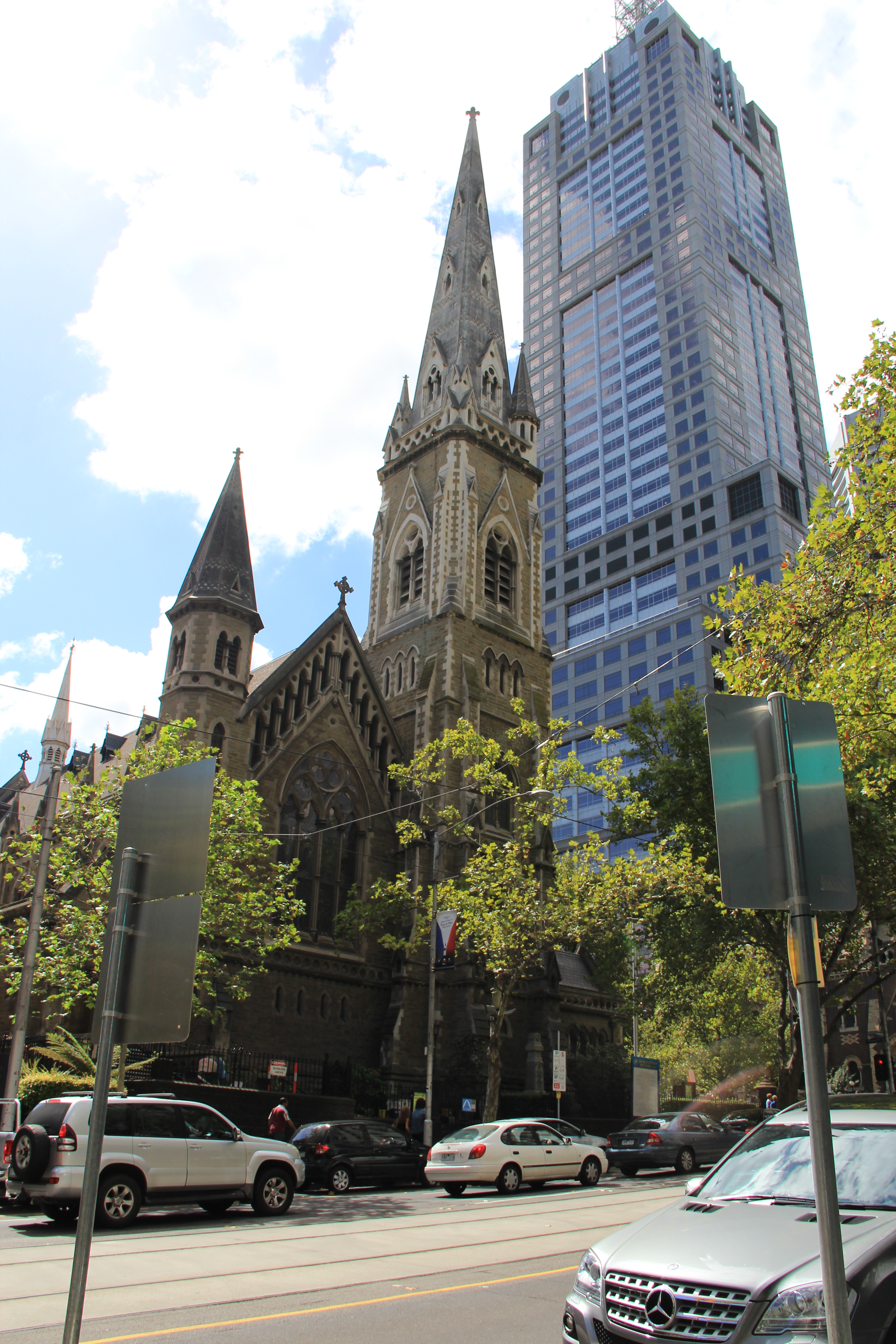
Scots' Church dwarfed by 120 Collins Street

As Melbourne's commercial and former shopping centre, Collins Street possesses some of Melbourne's best examples of Victorian architecture. Large churches include the Collins Street Baptist Church (1845), the St Michael's Uniting Church (1866) and the Scot's Presbyterian Church (1874).

Significant commercial buildings include Alston's Corner (1914) by Nahum Barnet, an excellent surviving example of Edwardian architecture, while the Block Arcade by D.C Askew (1891-3) is an excellent example of high Victorian Mannerist architecture. To the west in the financial end are some great examples of high Victorian Gothic architecture including William Pitt's elaborate Stock Exchange (1888), next to William Wardell's Venetian influenced Gothic Bank (1883) on the north east corner of Queen Street, which features some of Melbourne's finest Gothic interiors, and diagonally opposite the former National Mutual designed by Wright, Reed & Beaver (1891).

The old Commercial Bank of Australia Limited domed Chamber exists within the postmodern 333 Collins Street tower. It was designed by Lloyd Tayler and Alfred Dunn and built in 1891. Some of Australia's tallest buildings are along Collins Street, including the Rialto Towers, Collins Place towers 1 & 2, Nauru House, 120 Collins Street and 101 Collins Street and the former ANZ World Headquarters, at 380 Collins Street, behind the old Stock Exchange and Gothic Bank.

The 1929 built Francis House at 107 Collins Street, was the first building awarded the Street Architecture Medal and was designed by architects Blackett and Forster for pharmacists Henry Francis & Co. It still stands in near original condition, a handsome but narrow fronted five storey commercial building with a fine grained street level shopfront currently leased by Bally.

The Bank of New South Wales Melbourne building, completed in 1857, earned architect Joseph Reed a first prize in architecture. When the building was demolished in 1935, the facade was transplanted to the University of Melbourne in Parkville to become the Commerce Building. It is now retained on the facade of the new building being constructed for the Faculty of Architecture, Building and Planning.

== Shopping and boutiques ==
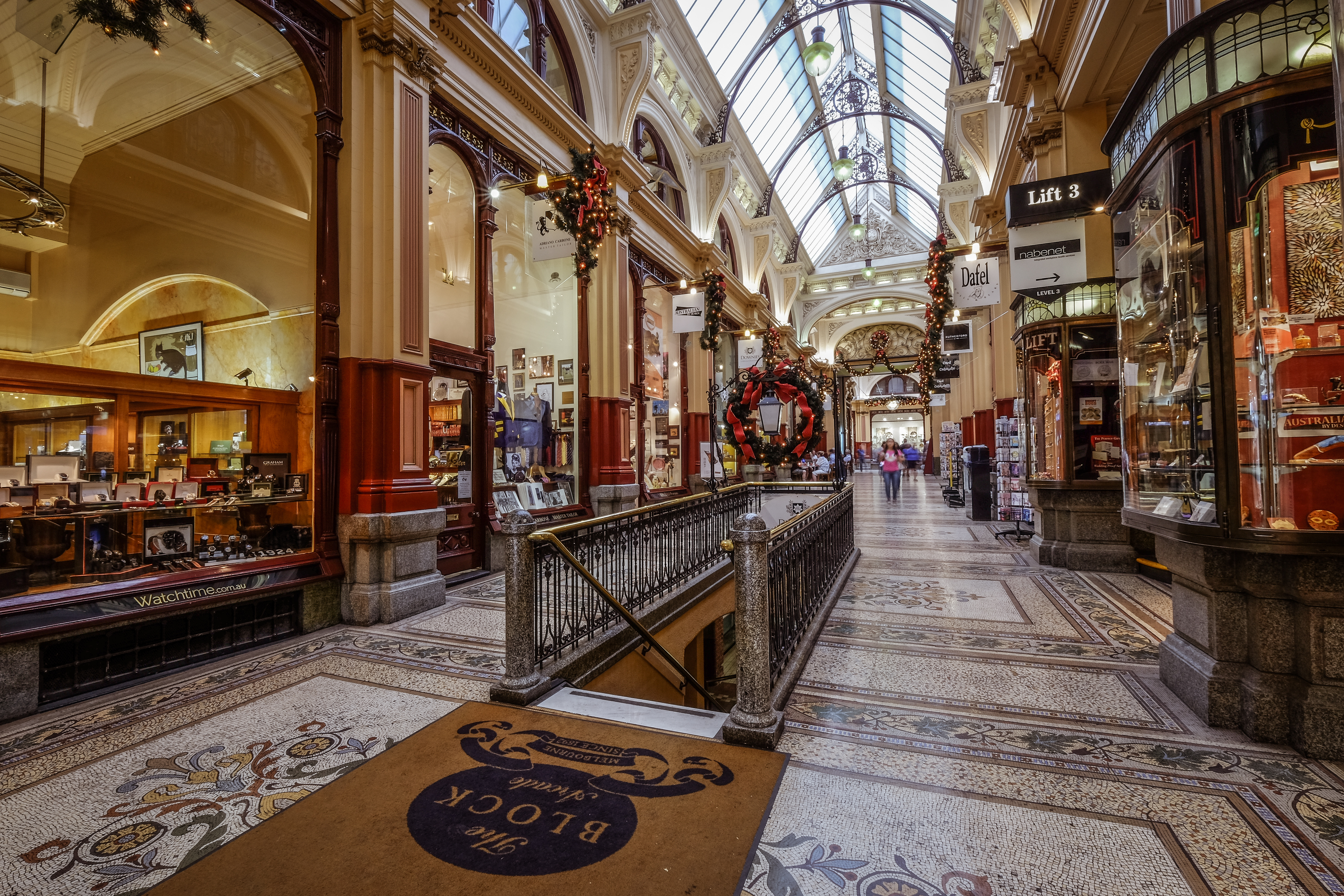
Block Arcade

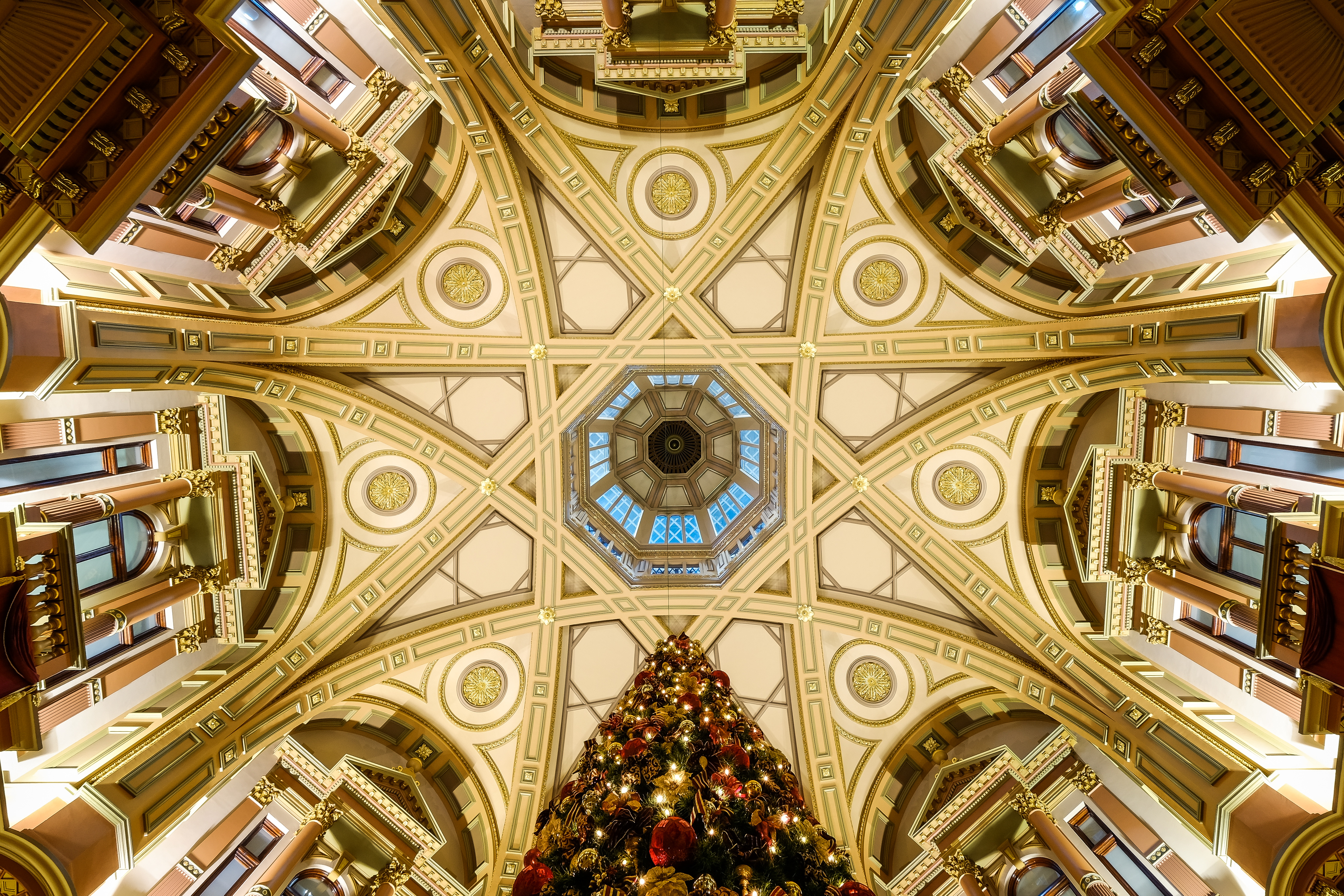
Atrium roof of Strozzi

Collins Street is Melbourne's premier shopping street and retailers with flagship stores there include: Prada, Louis Vuitton, Moncler, Tiffany & Co, Bulgari, Giorgio Armani, Dior, Bottega Veneta, Saint Laurent, Balenciaga, Celine, TAG Heuer, Paspaley, Cartier, Gucci, Ermenegildo Zegna, Burberry, Max Mara, Hermès, Dolce & Gabbana, Christian Louboutin, Fendi, Jimmy Choo, Versace, Golden Goose, Patek Philippe, Breitling, Fred, Chopard, Graff, Hugo Boss, Canali, Van Cleef & Arpels, Omega, Jaeger-LeCoultre, Georg Jensen, Rolex, Loewe, Longchamp, Aesop, Longines, Hardy Brothers, Jan Logan, Bremont, Montblanc and Franck Muller.

Major shopping centres include Collins Place, Block Arcade, Georges on Collins, 80 Collins, Collins 234, 260 Collins and Centreway.

== Noteworthy businesses ==
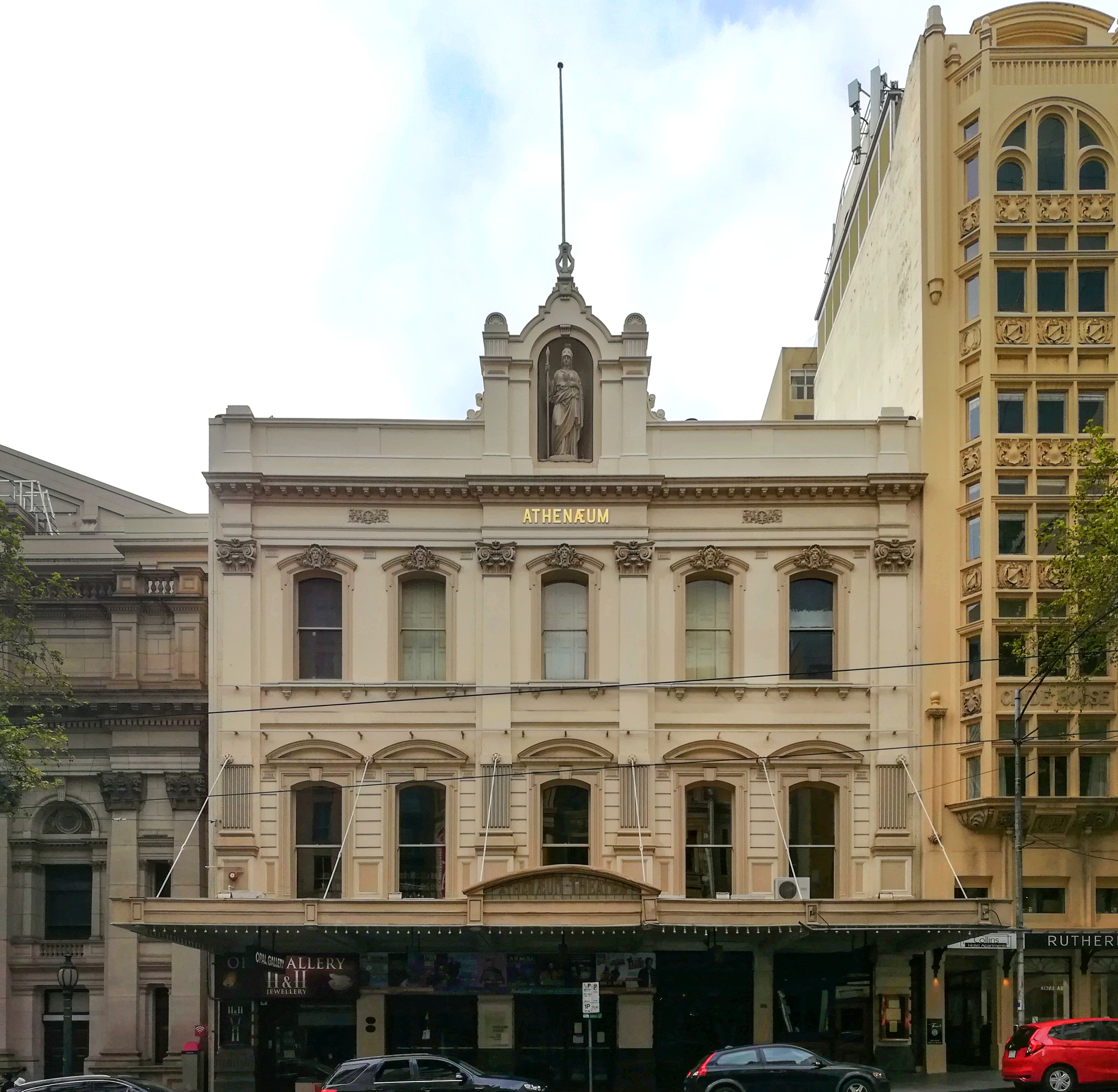
The Athenaeum

Two theatres, the Athenaeum and Regent theatres, are both located on Collins Street. These theatres host Australian and international productions and live performances throughout the year.

There are many hotels located on Collins Street, with major hotels including the Sofitel Melbourne on Collins, The Grand Hyatt Melbourne, The Westin Melbourne, W Hotel Melbourne, Novotel Melbourne on Collins and the InterContinental Melbourne at Rialto.

The Melbourne Club, a prestigious private social club established in the 19th century is located in renaissance revival style buildings designed by Leonard Terry and built in 1845.

The Liberal Party of Australia's Victorian division is located within Emirates House at 257 Collins Street.

The Reserve Bank of Australia's Victorian branch is located on Collins Street. Its 1960 buildings were once the national office for the bank. Australian financial services group Macquarie are located within the luxury 80 Collins precinct. Similarly, most global financial institutions with a presence in Melbourne, such as Goldman Sachs and Lazard, have their headquarters located on Collins Street. The majority are located within the prestigious 101 Collins Street, contributing to the reputation that Collins Street enjoys to this day.

Nauru House is notable for being the last offshore investment owned by the people of Nauru. It was sold in 2004.

== Ghost sightings ==
Collins Street has been a popular stop over for local ghost tours, with a number of apparent sightings especially around the historical Docklands area.

== Transport ==
Yarra Trams routes 11, 12, 48 and 109 run down Collins Street through the city centre, mainly to terminuses in Melbourne's eastern suburbs, Port Melbourne and the Docklands precinct. Collins Street is also served by Parliament railway station at its eastern end and Southern Cross railway station at its western end.

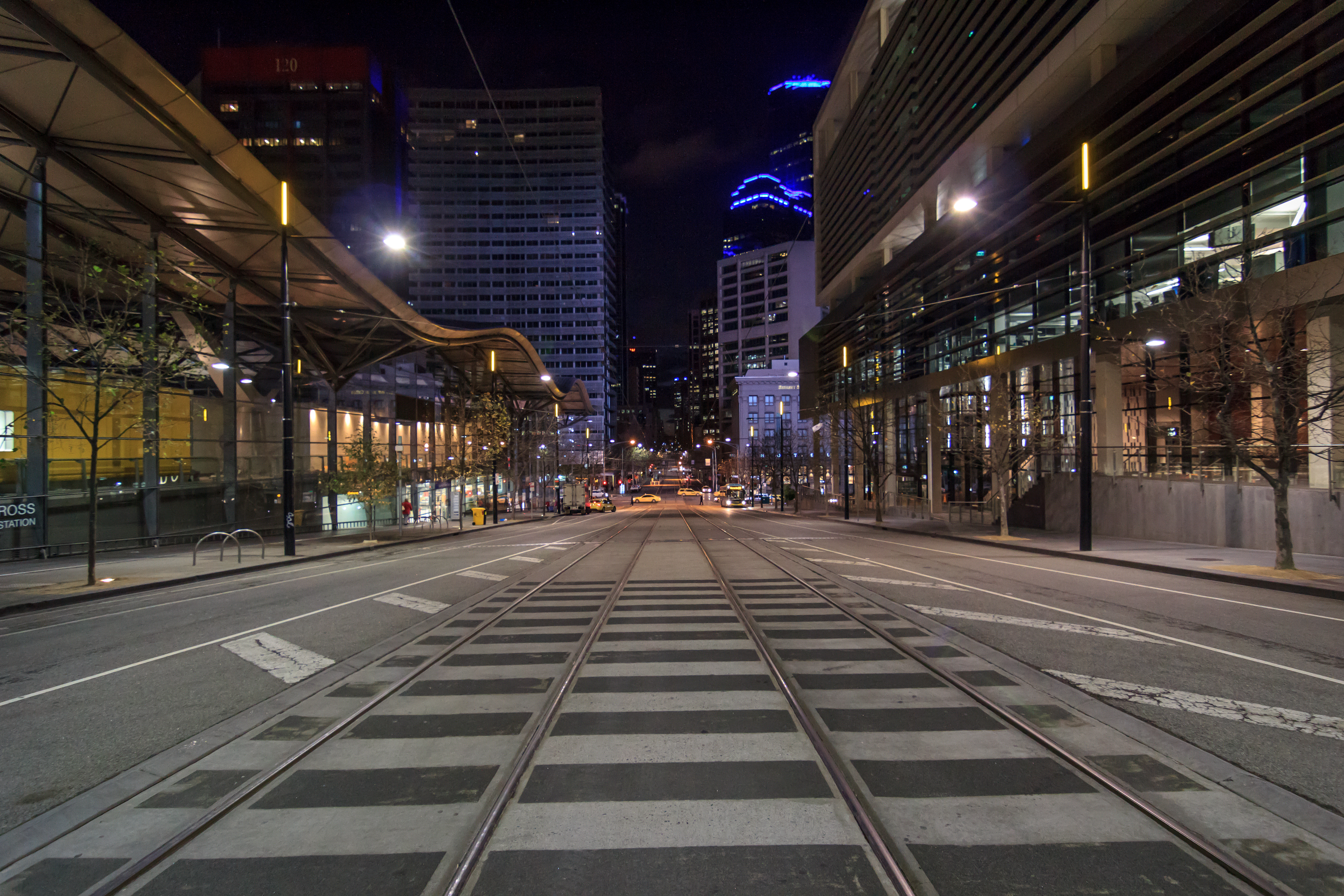
Looking down Collins Street from Southern Cross station

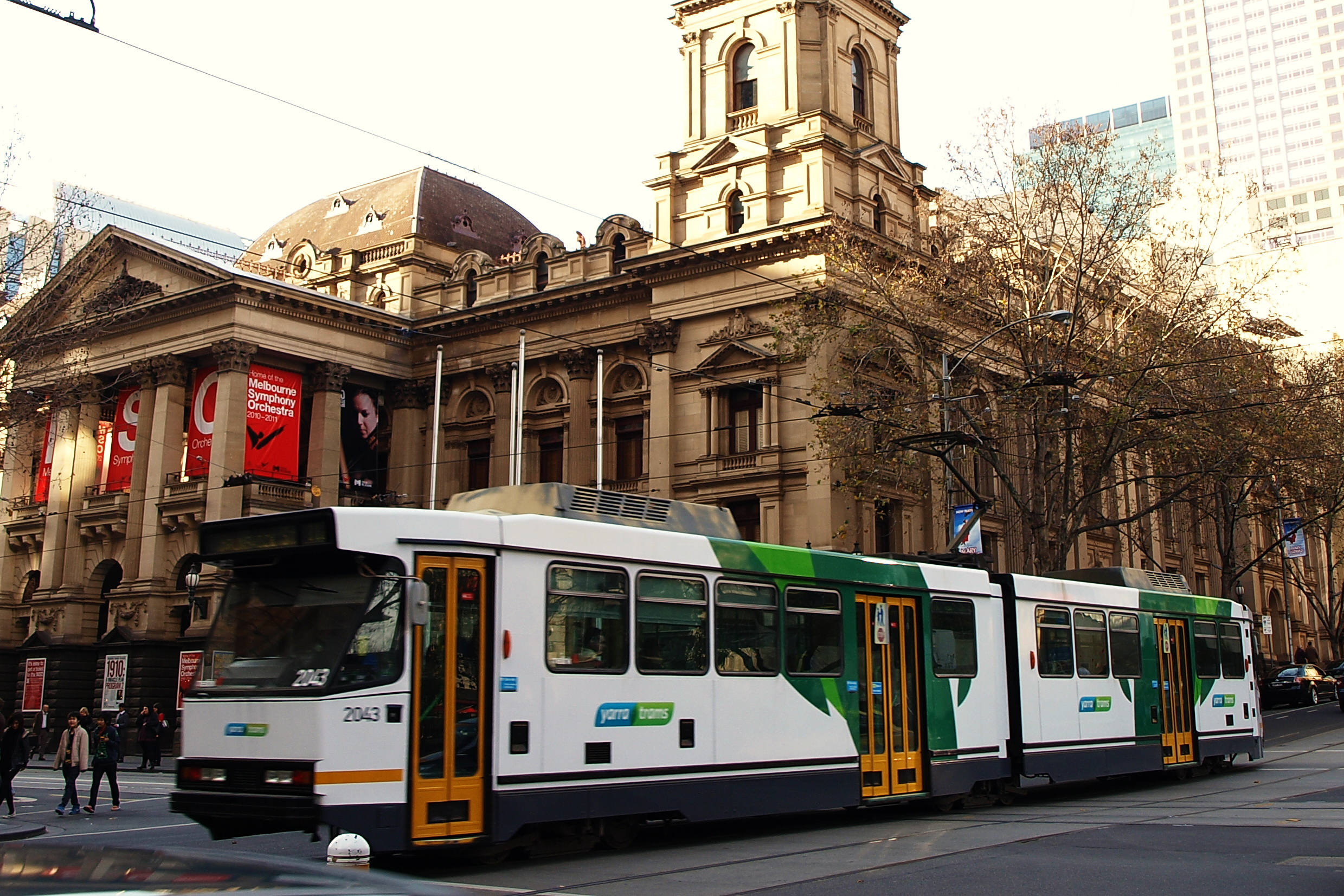
B class tram

== Gallery ==
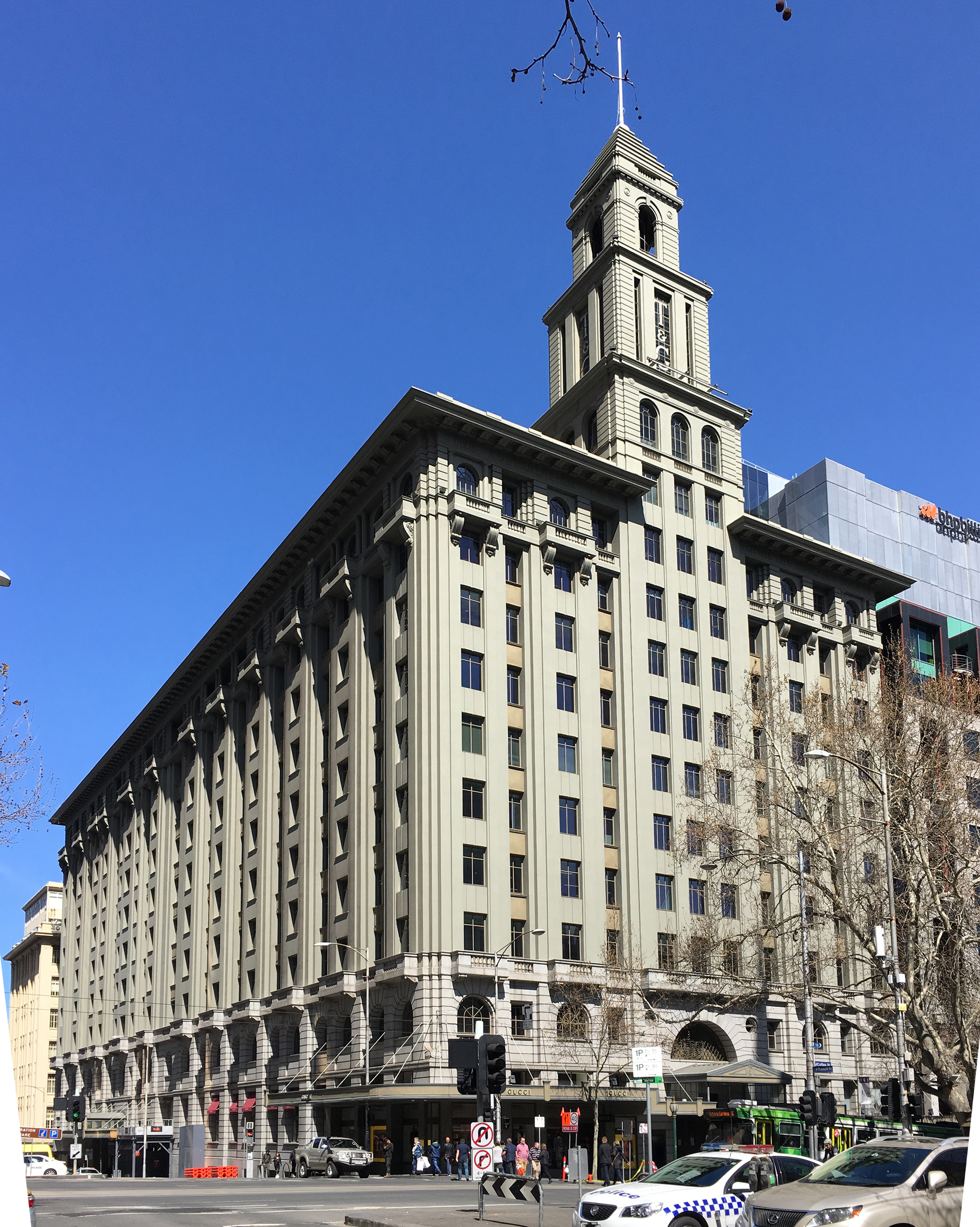
T&G Building

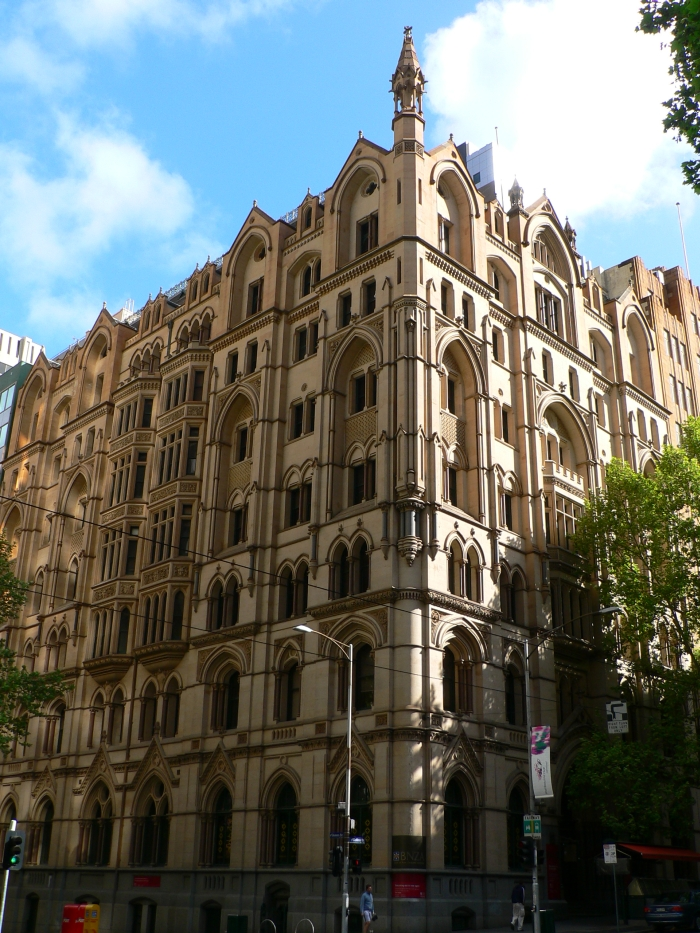
A. C. Goode House

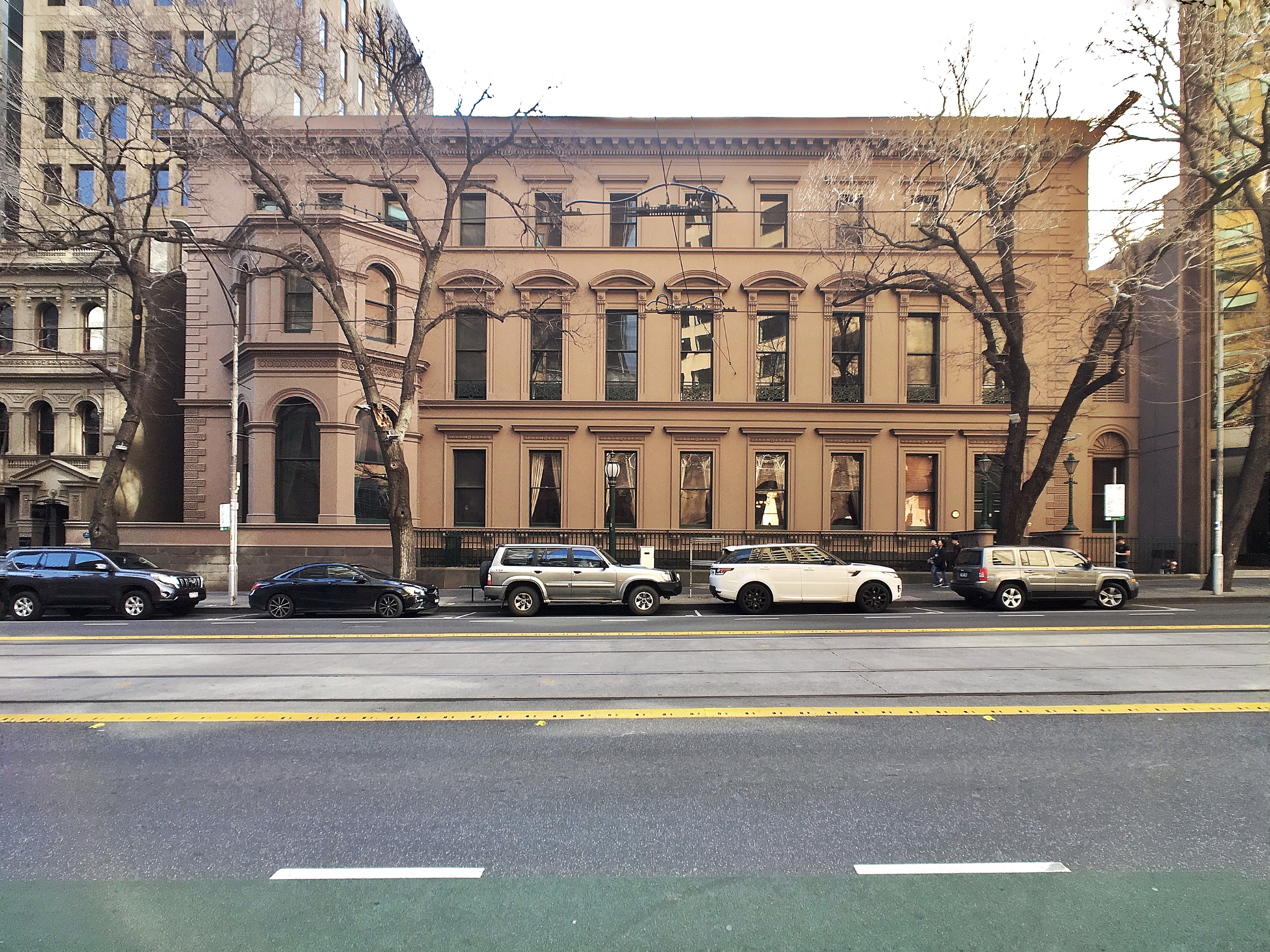
Melbourne Club

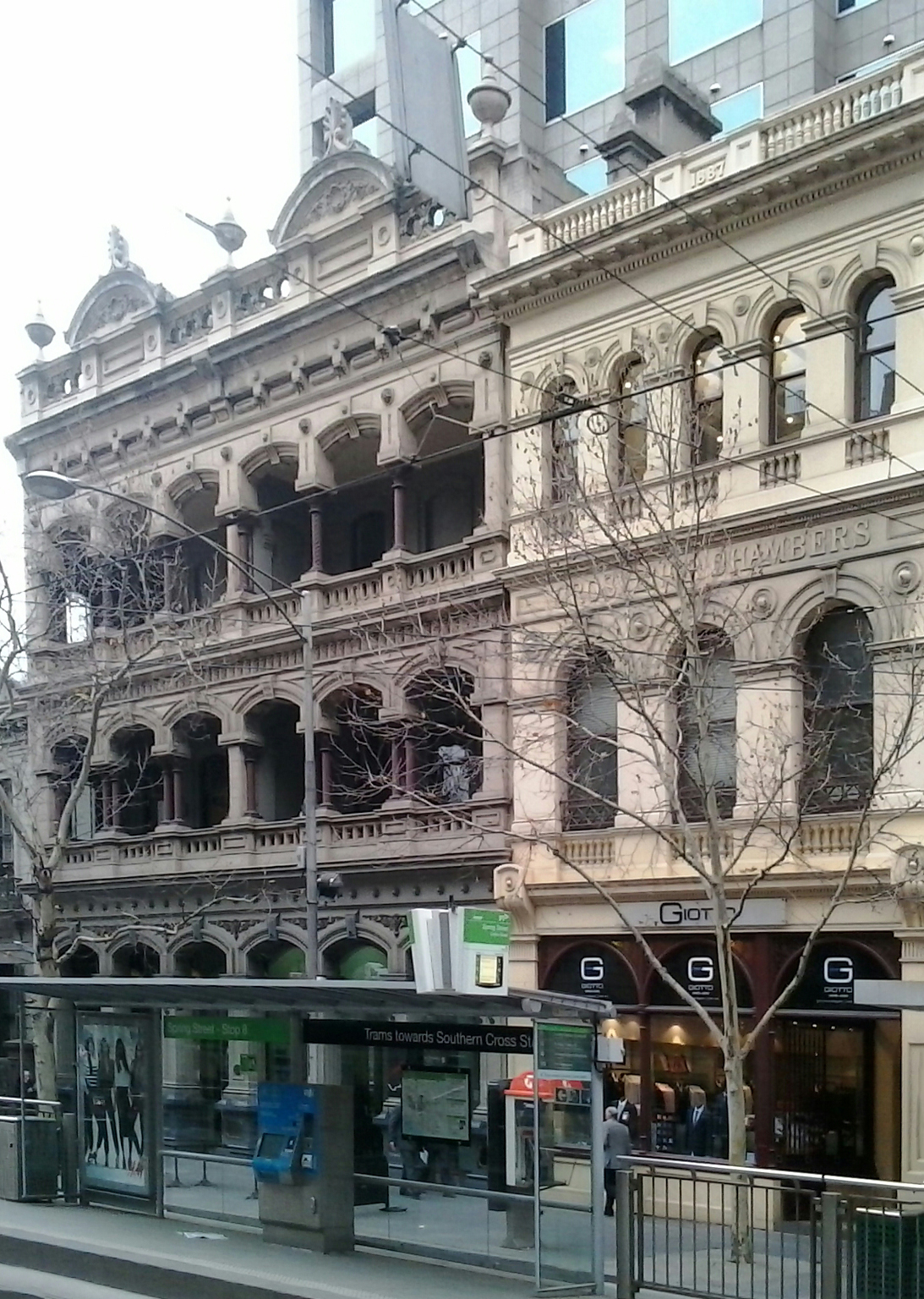
Grosvenor Chambers

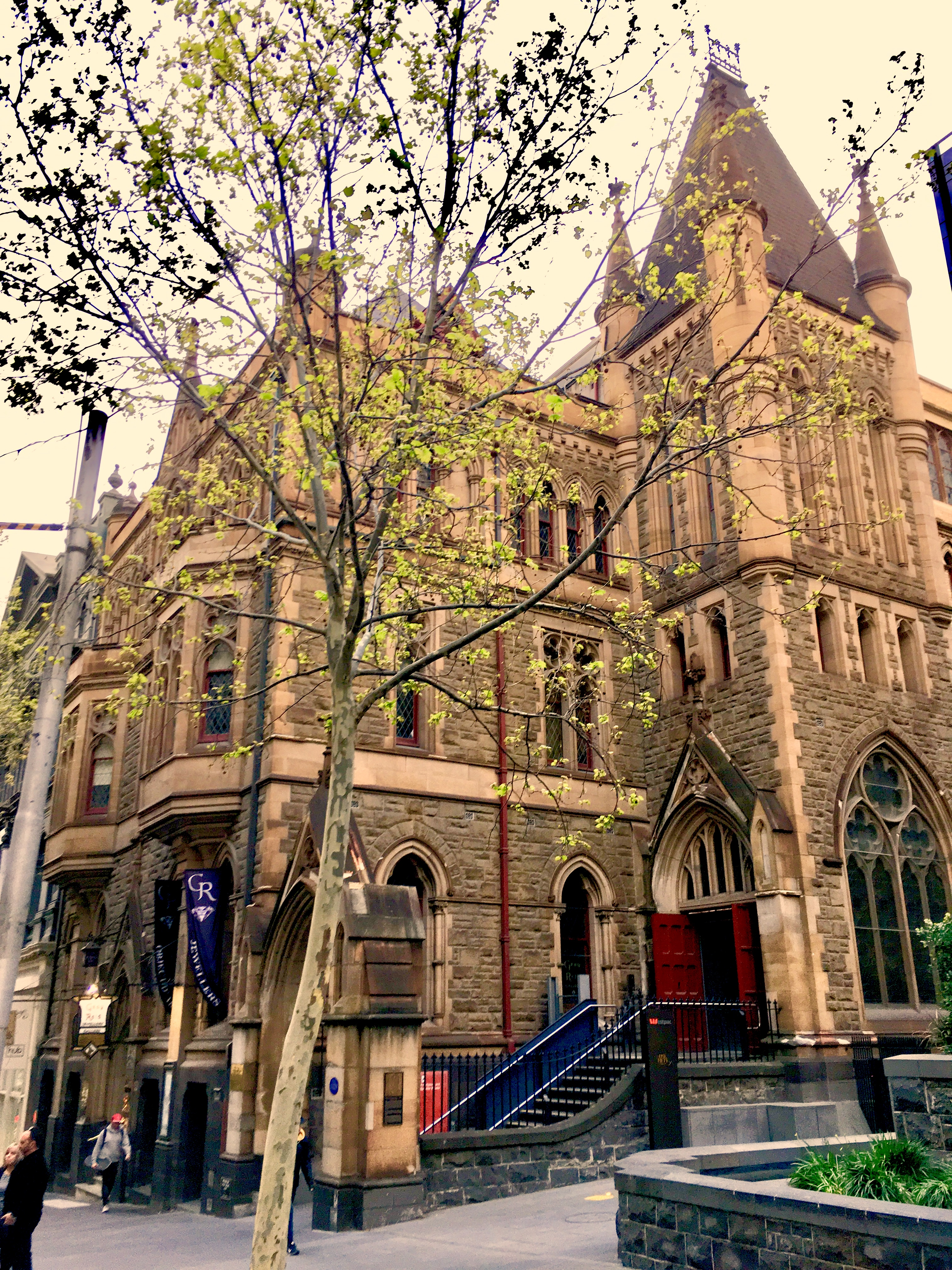
Assembly Hall

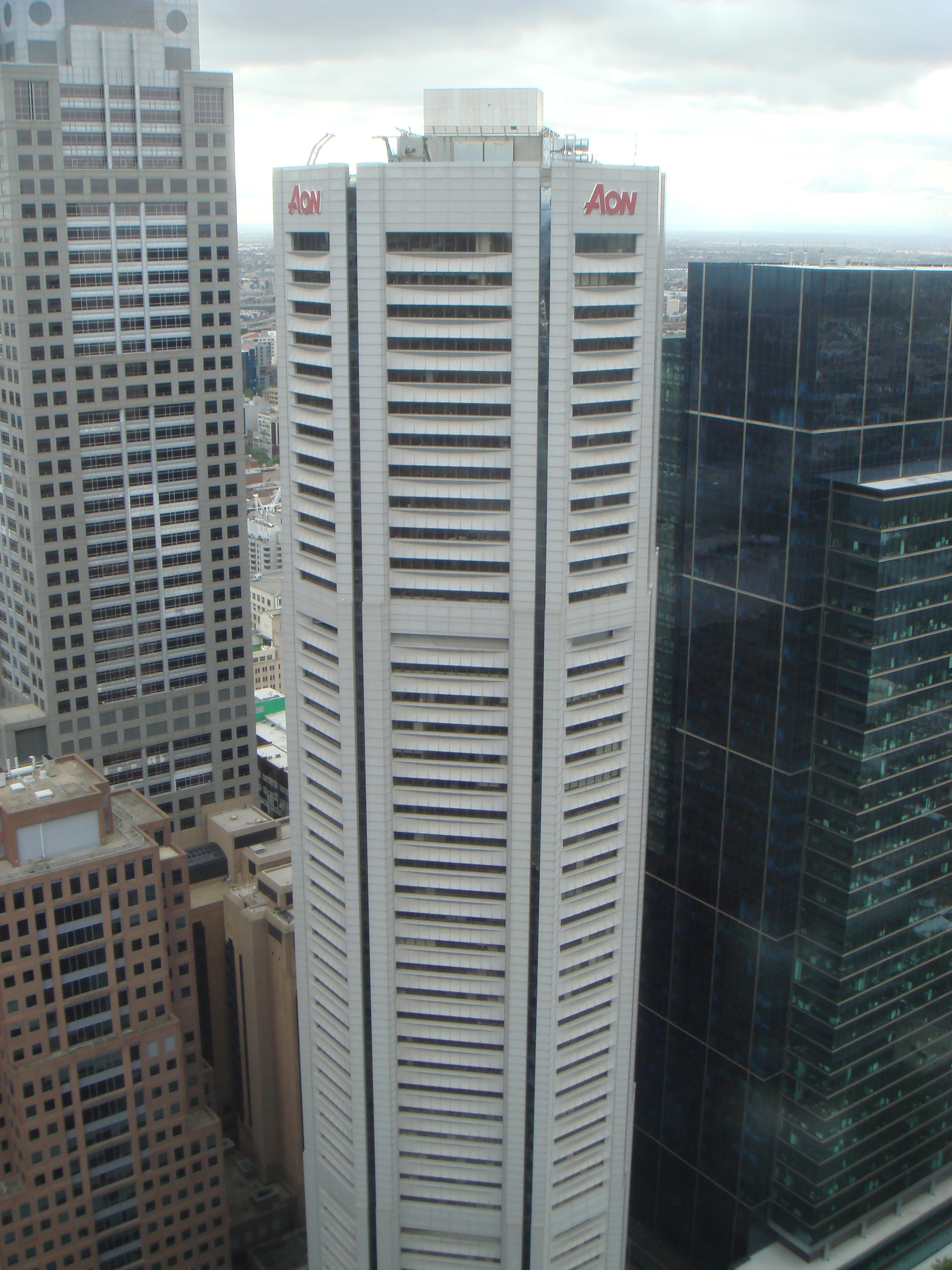
Nauru House

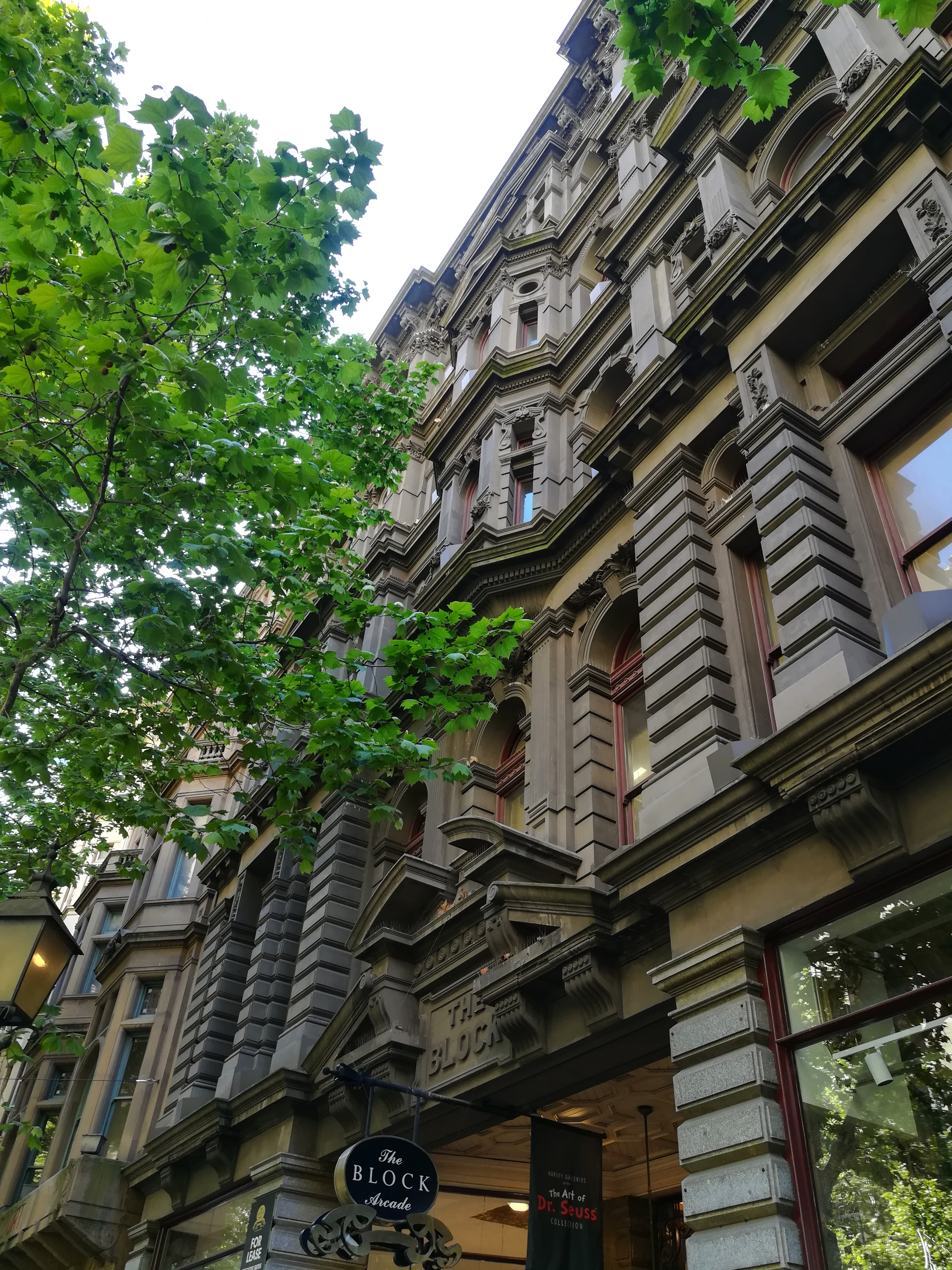
The Block

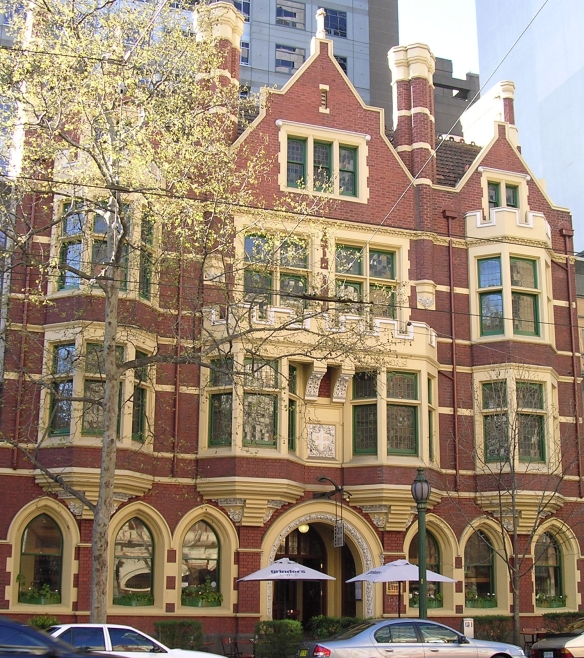
Professional Chambers building

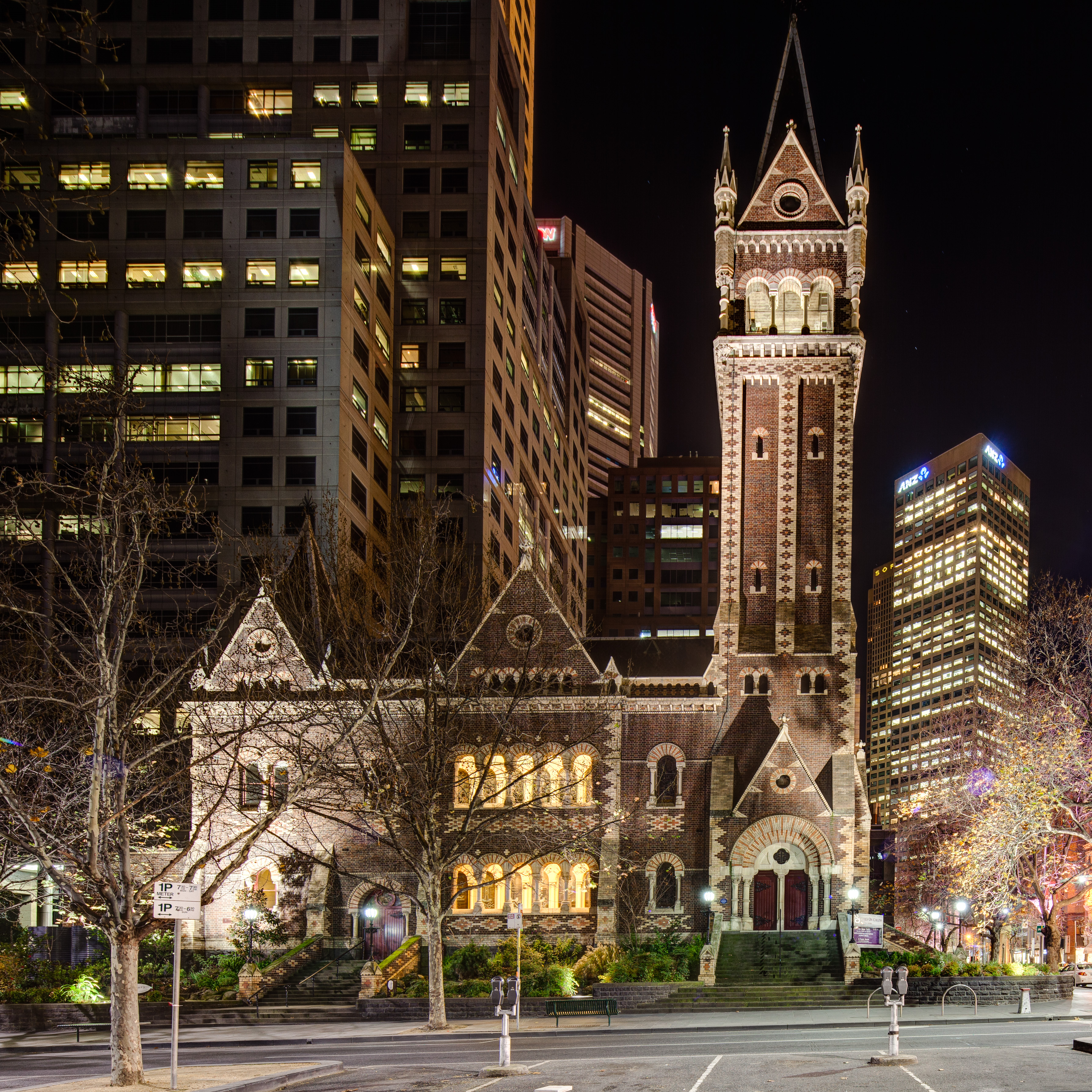
St Michael's Uniting Church

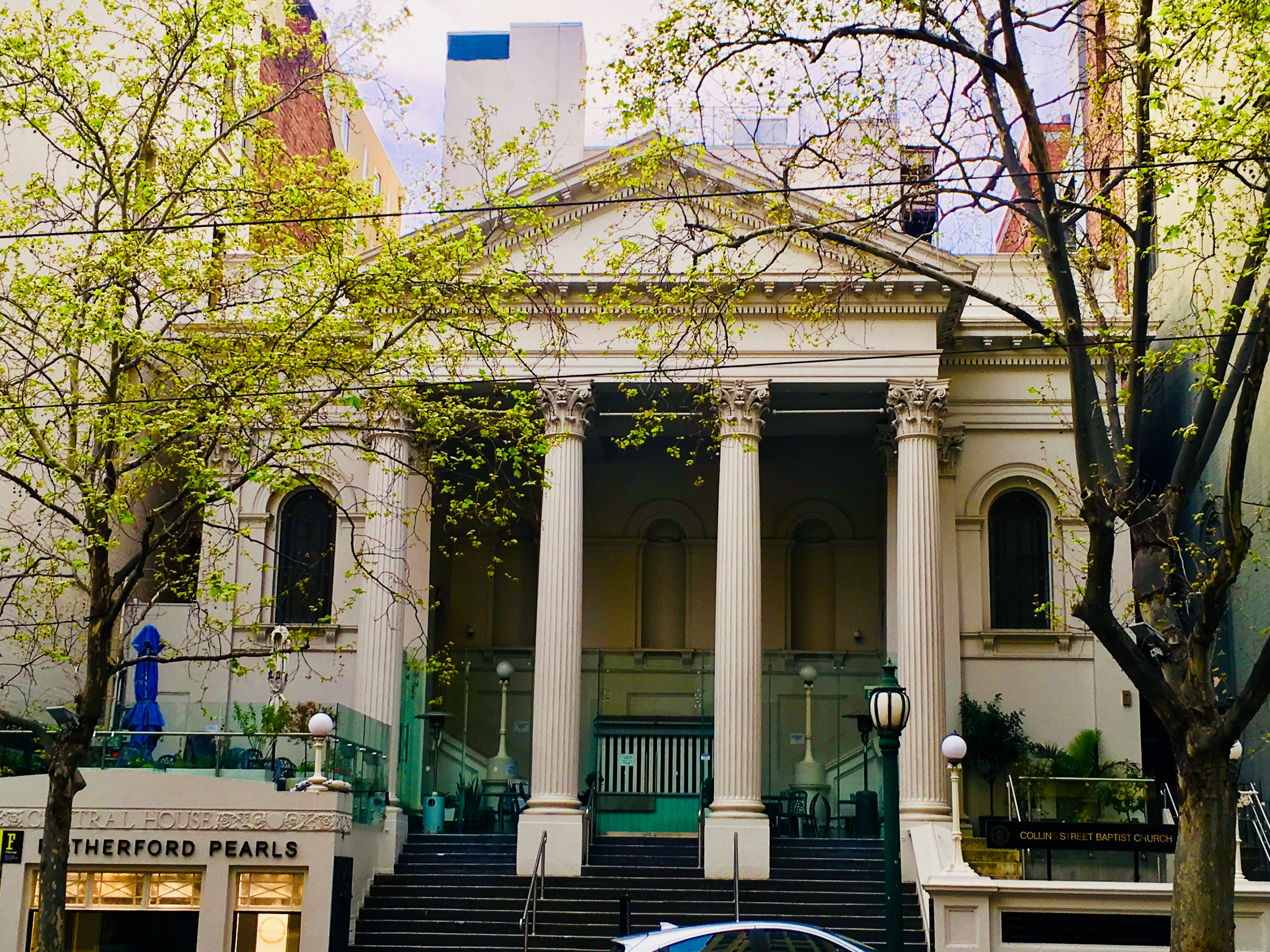
Baptist Church

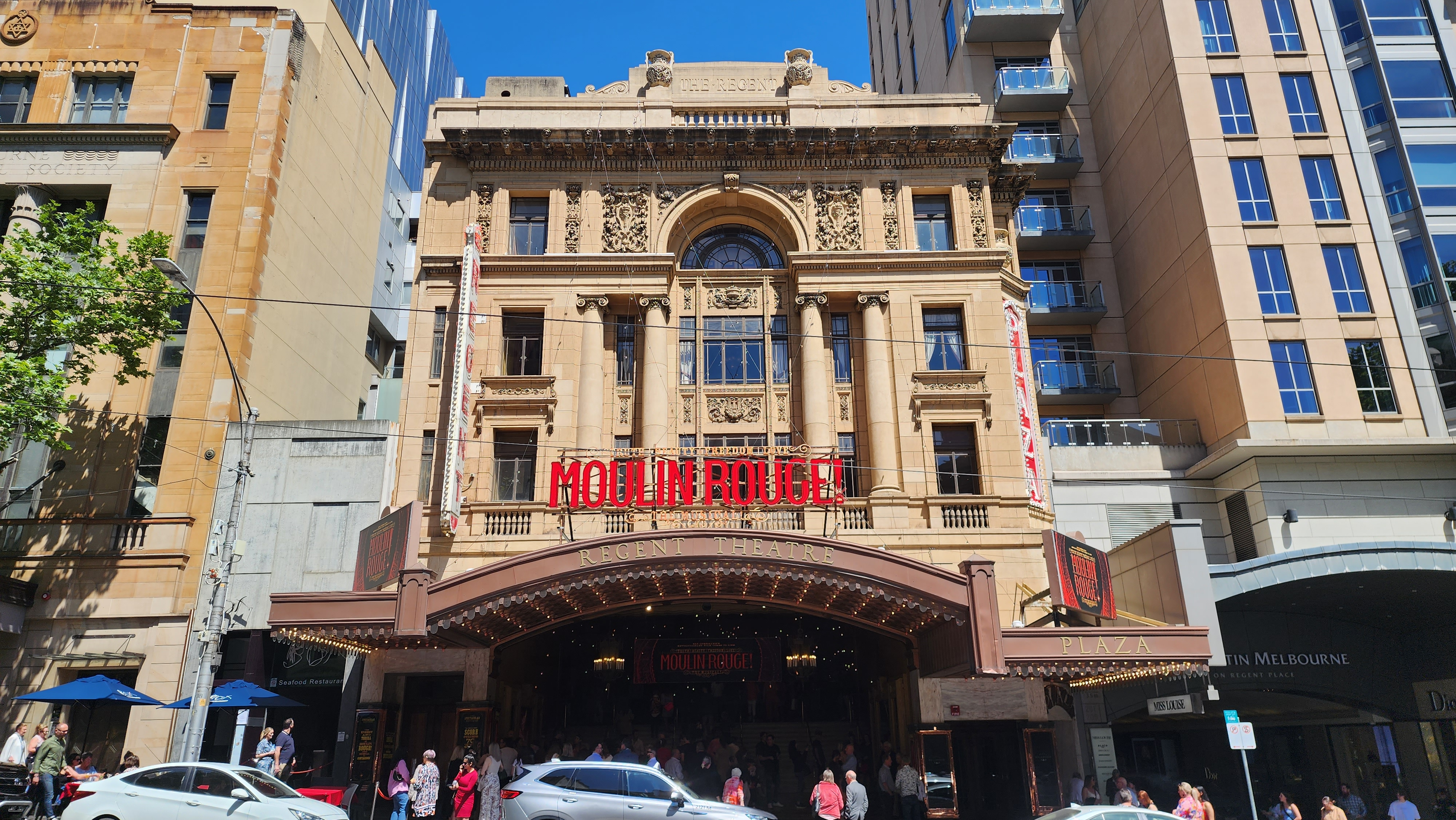
Regent Theatre

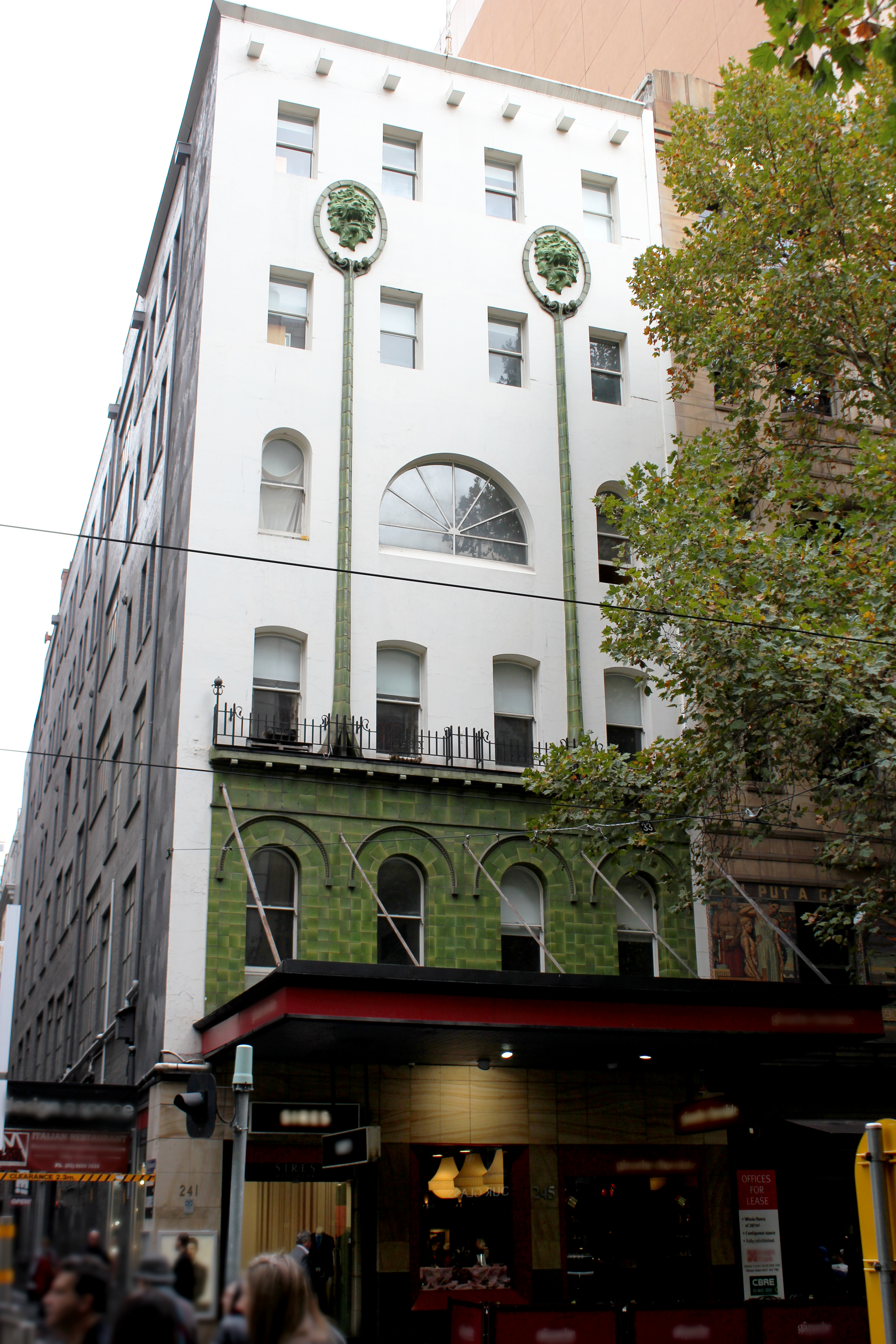
Fourth Victoria Building

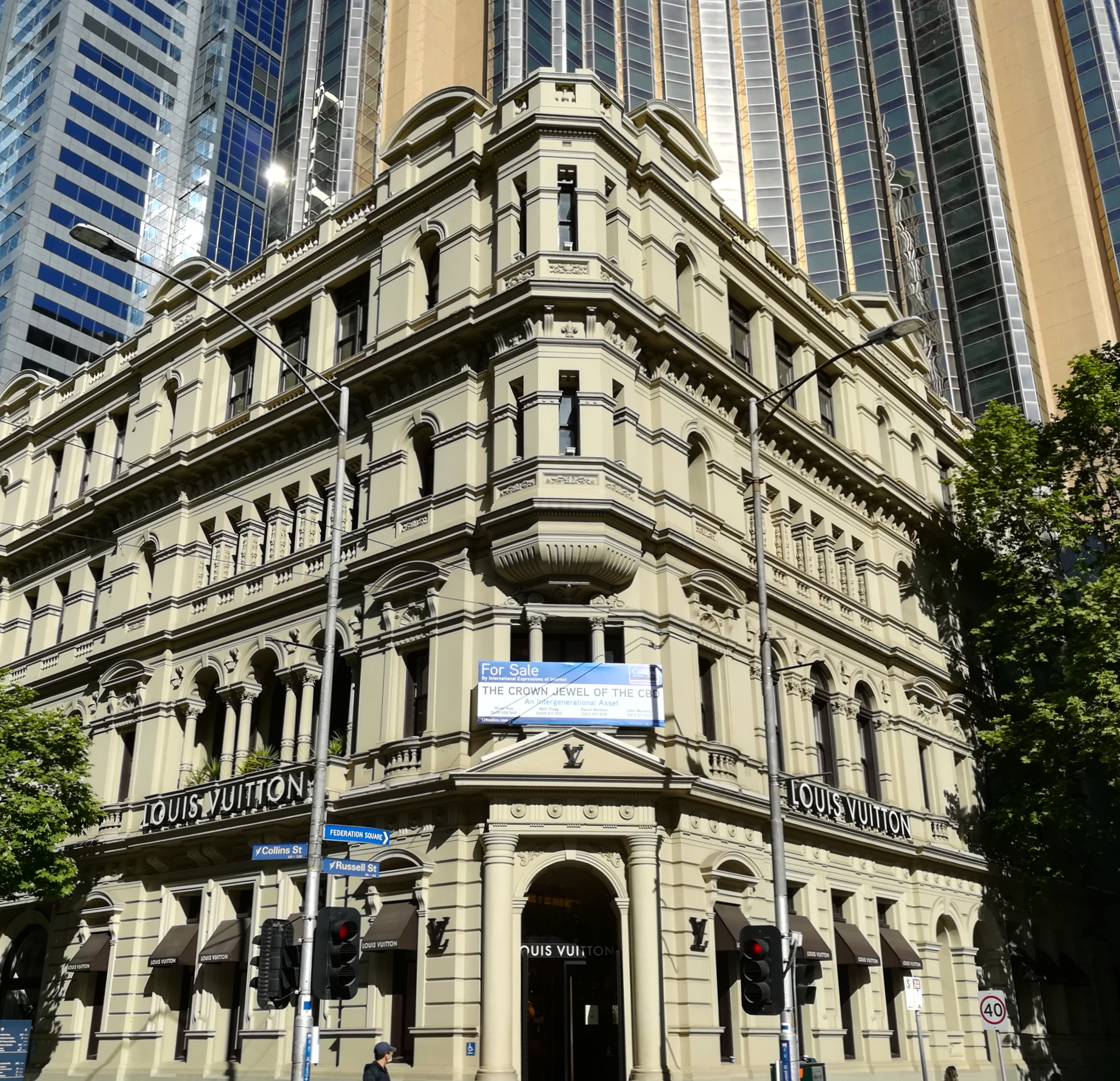
Cambridge Building

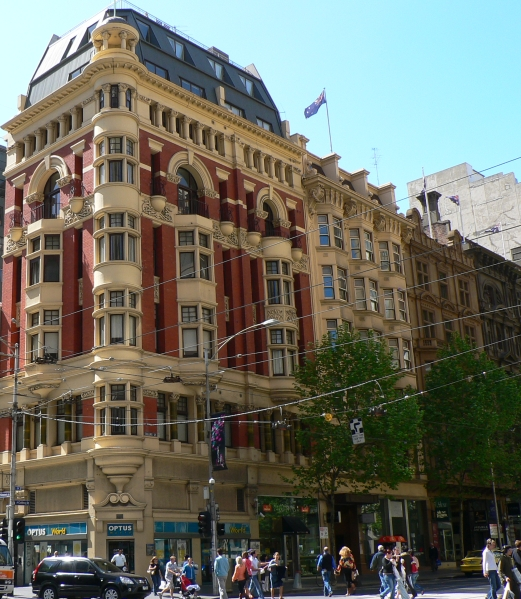
Alston's Corner

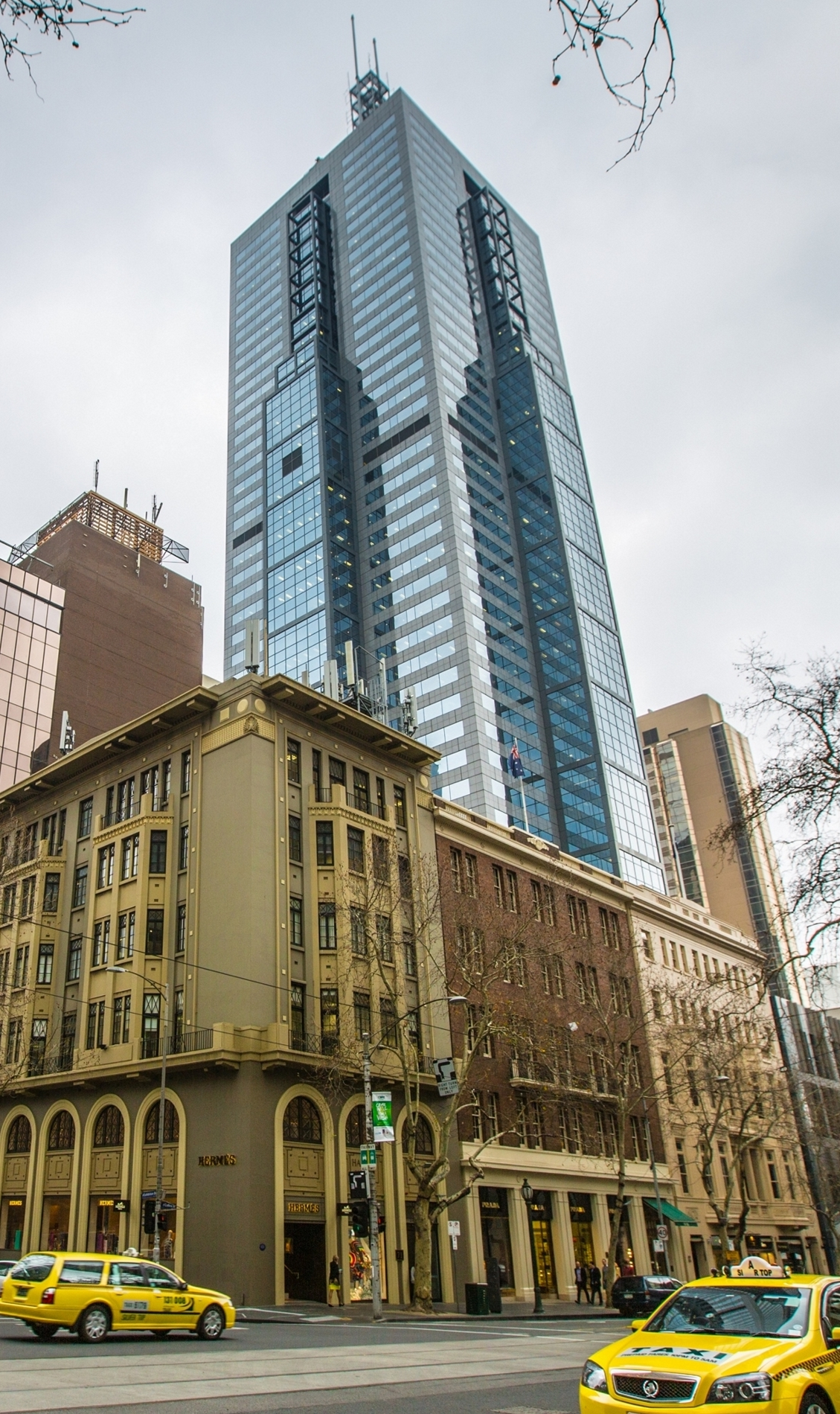
101 Collins Street

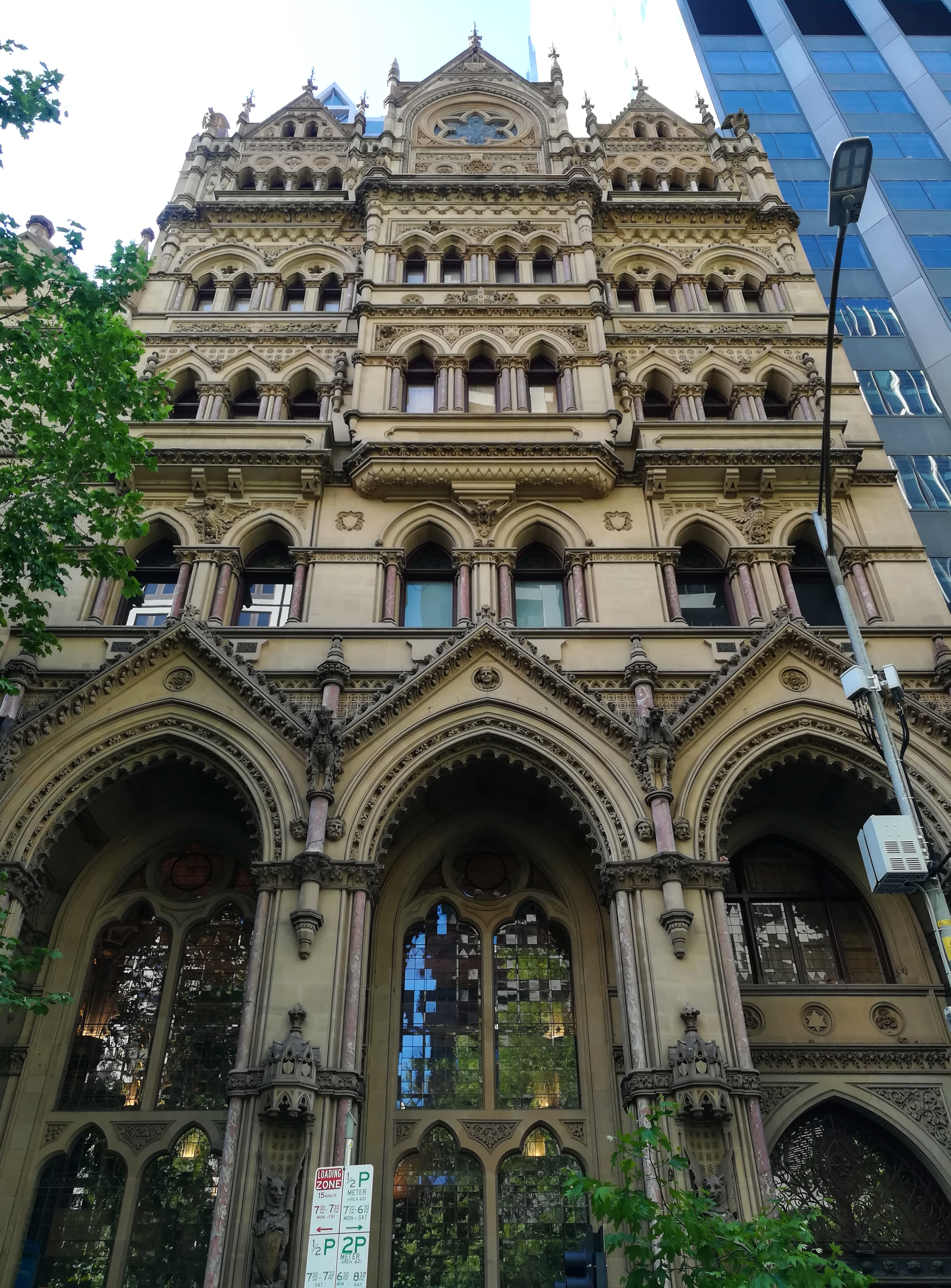
Former Stock Exchange

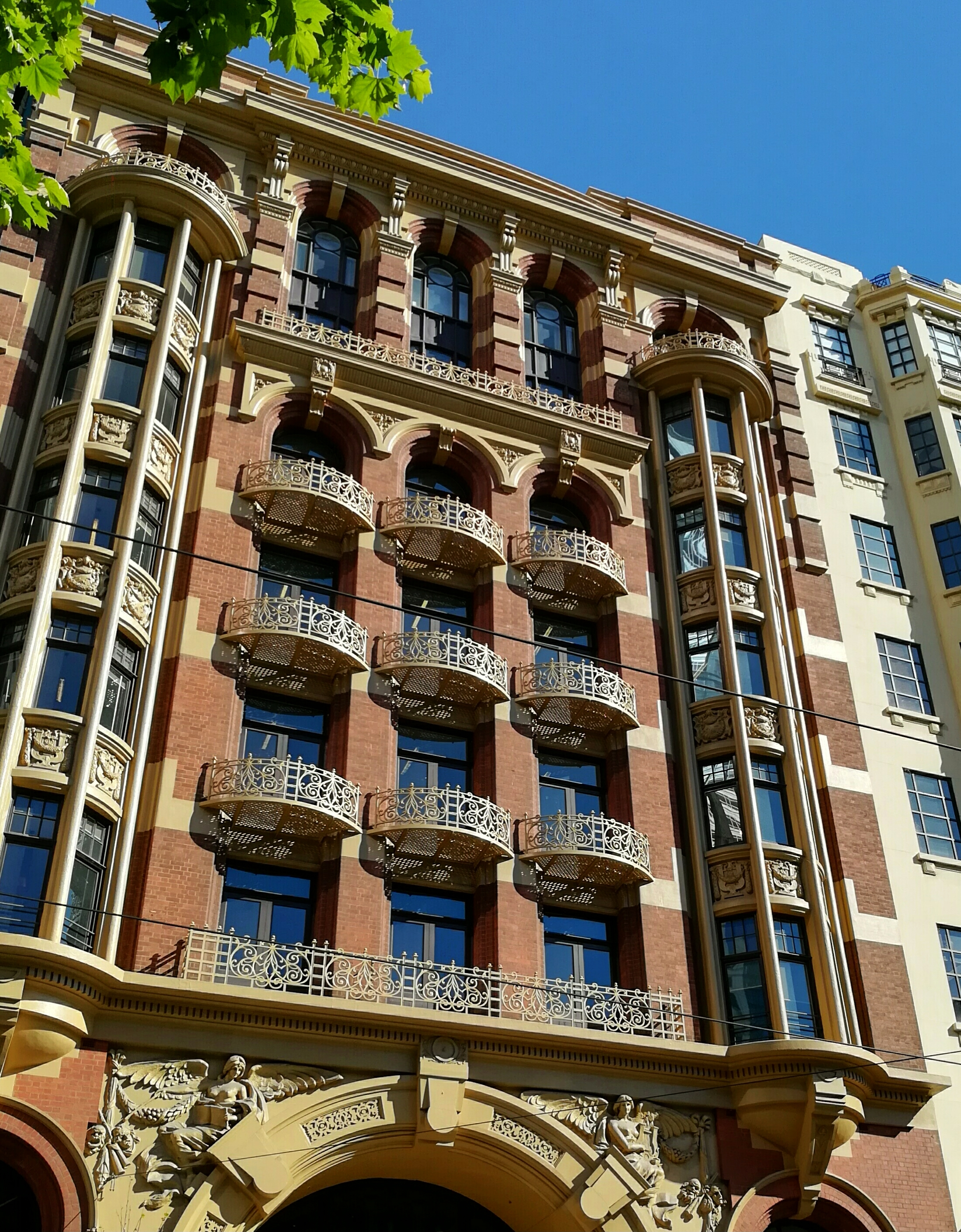
Auditorium Building

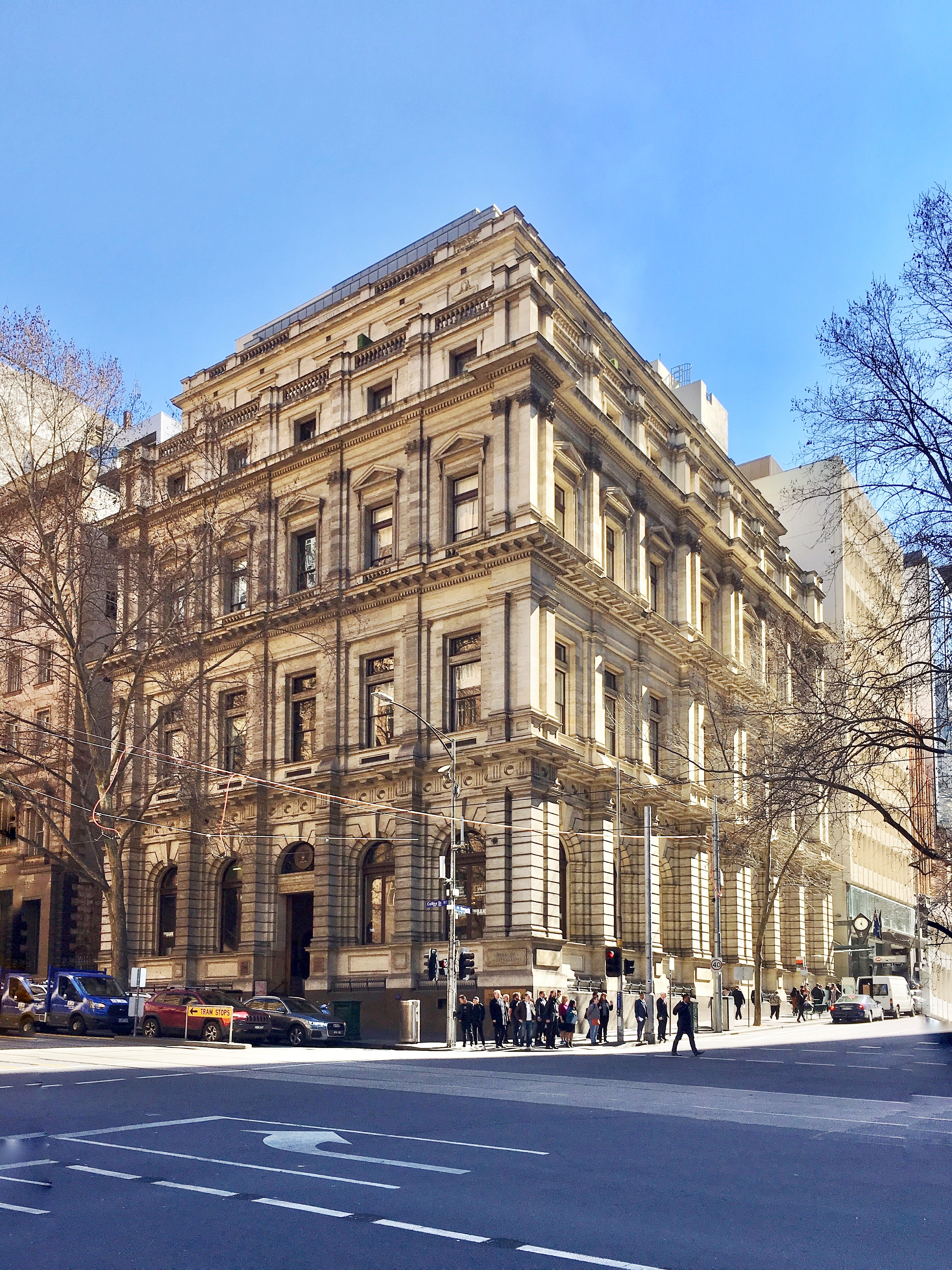
Bank of Australasia Headquarters

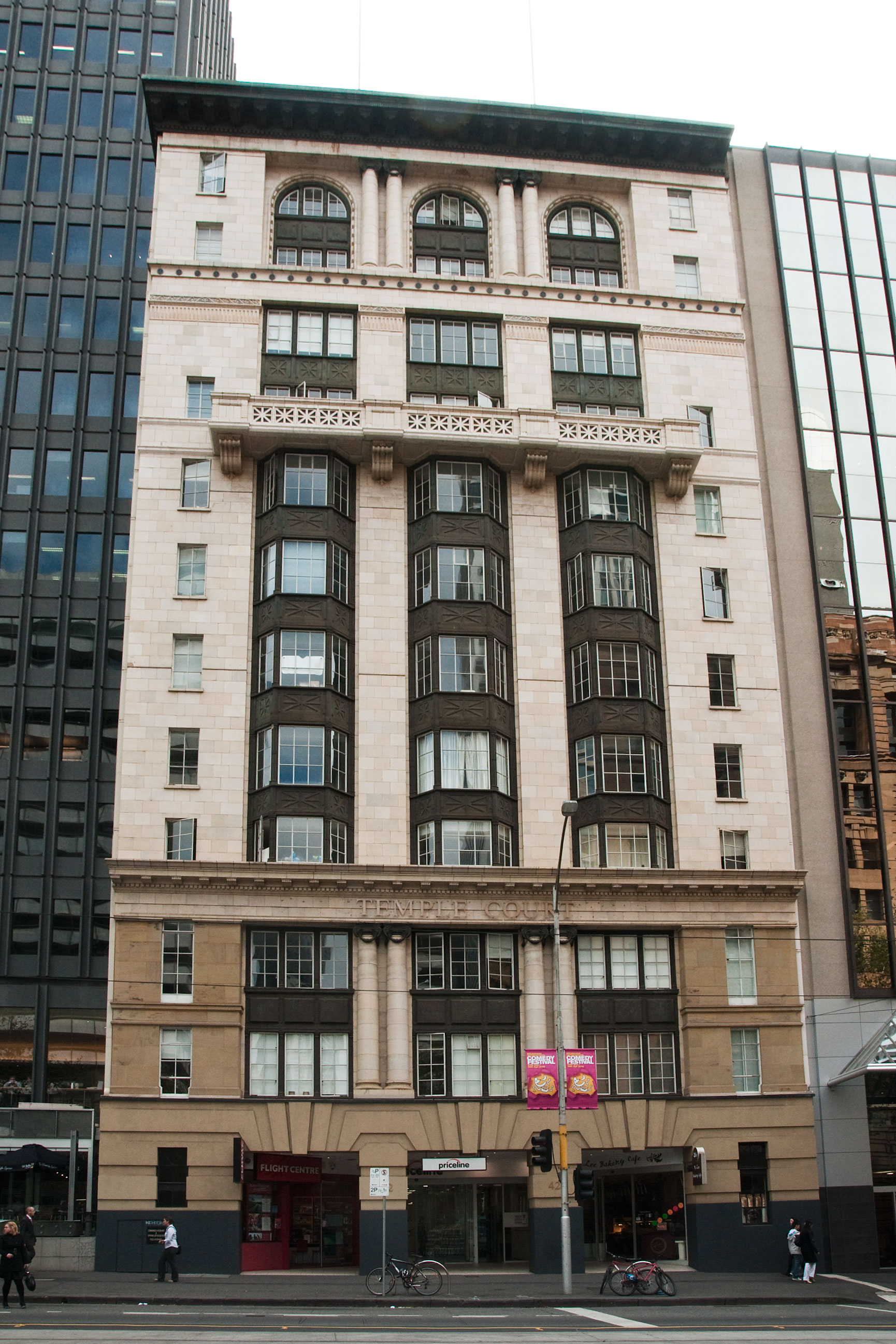
Temple Court Building

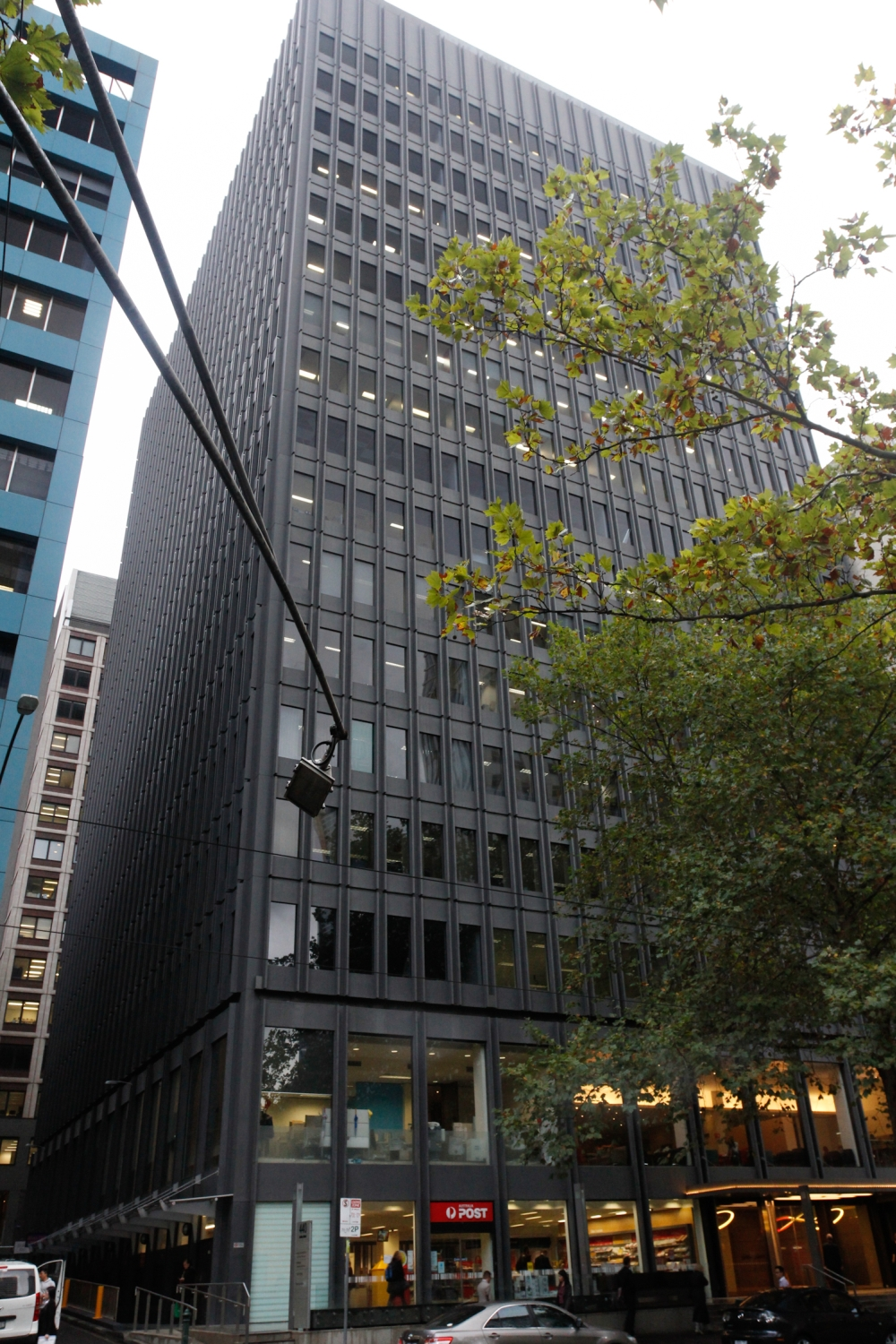
AON Centre

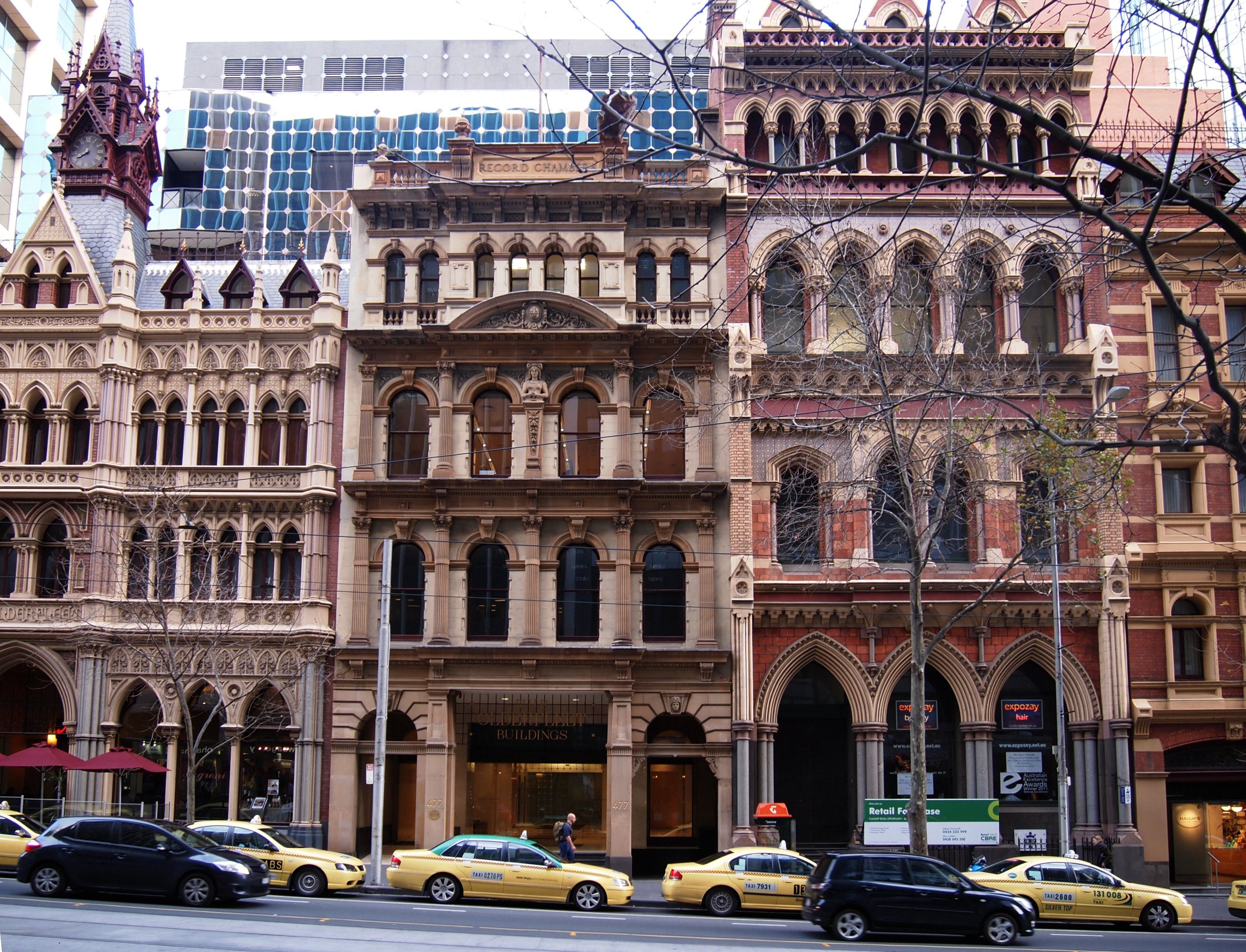
Olderfleet buildings

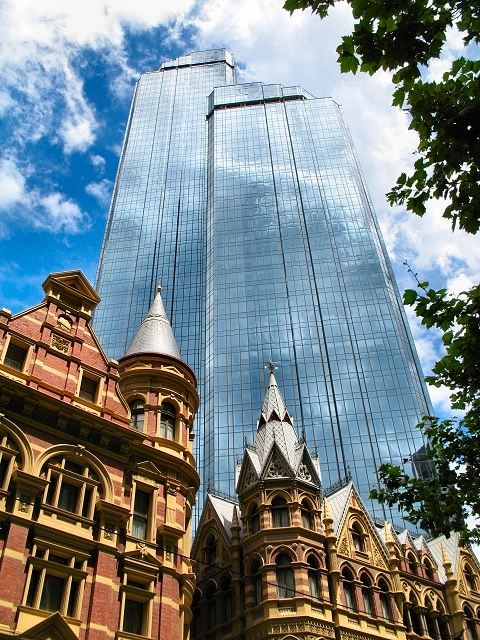
Intercontinental Hotel, dwarfed by the Rialto Tower

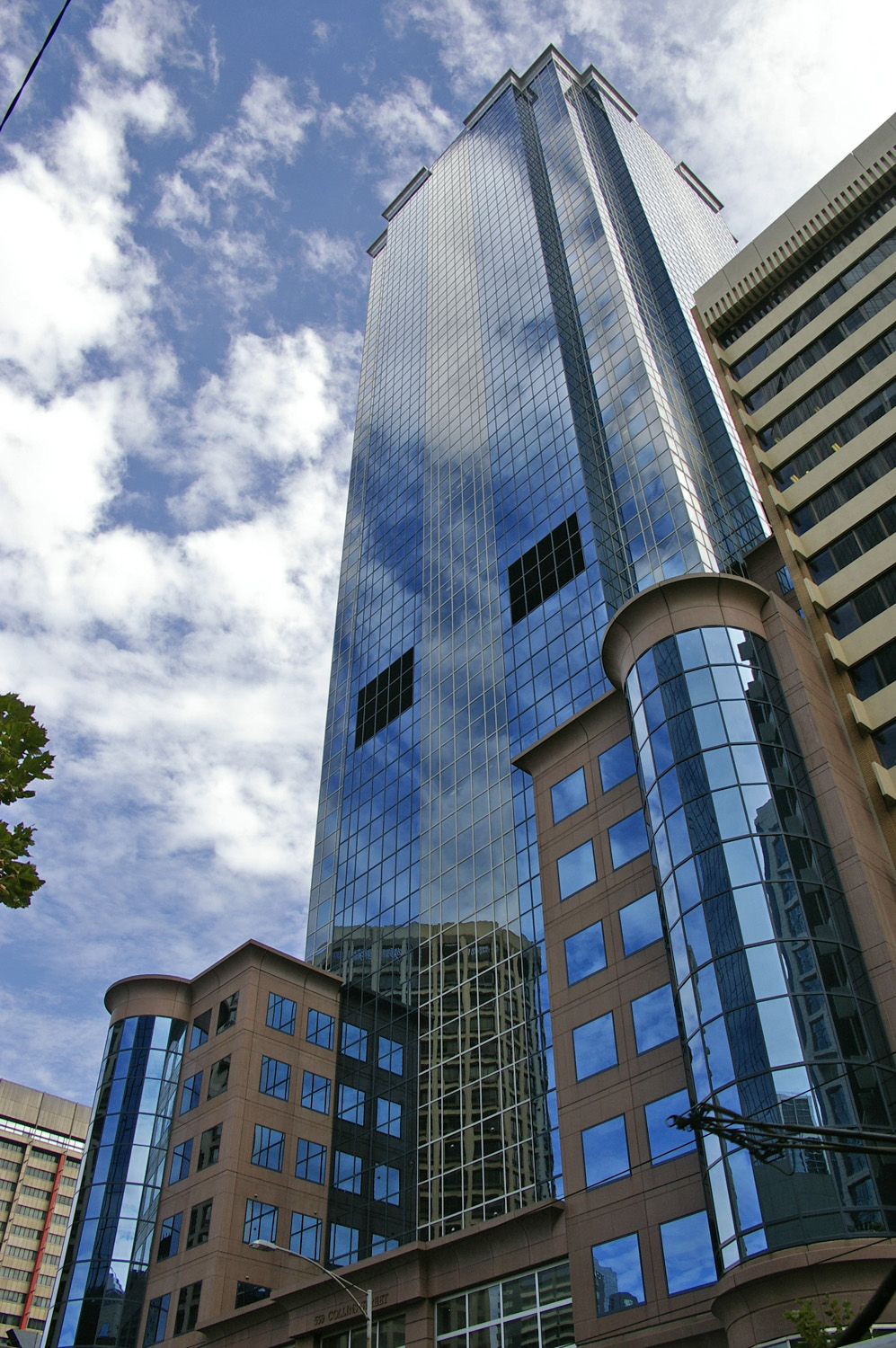
530 Collins Street

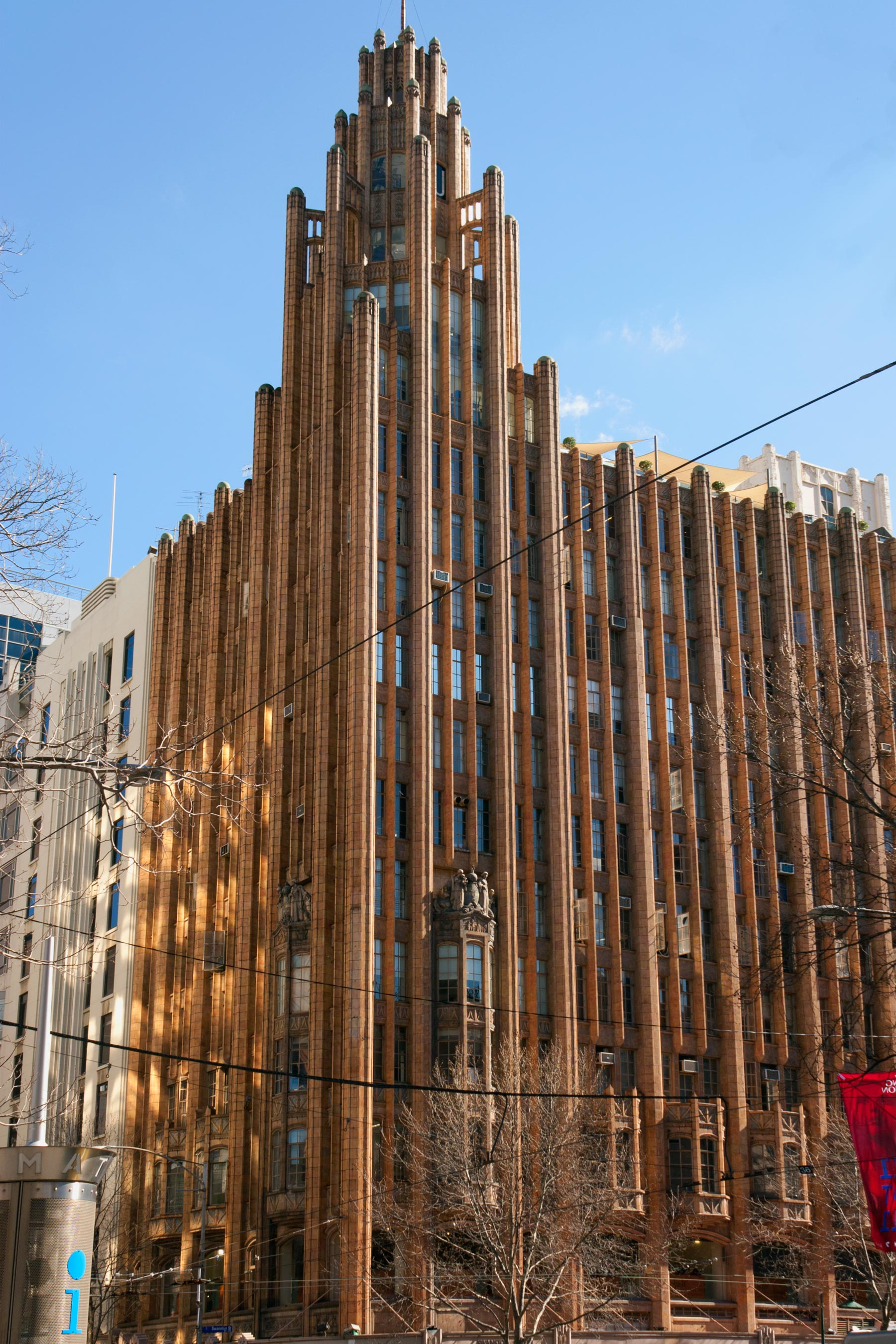
Manchester Unity Building

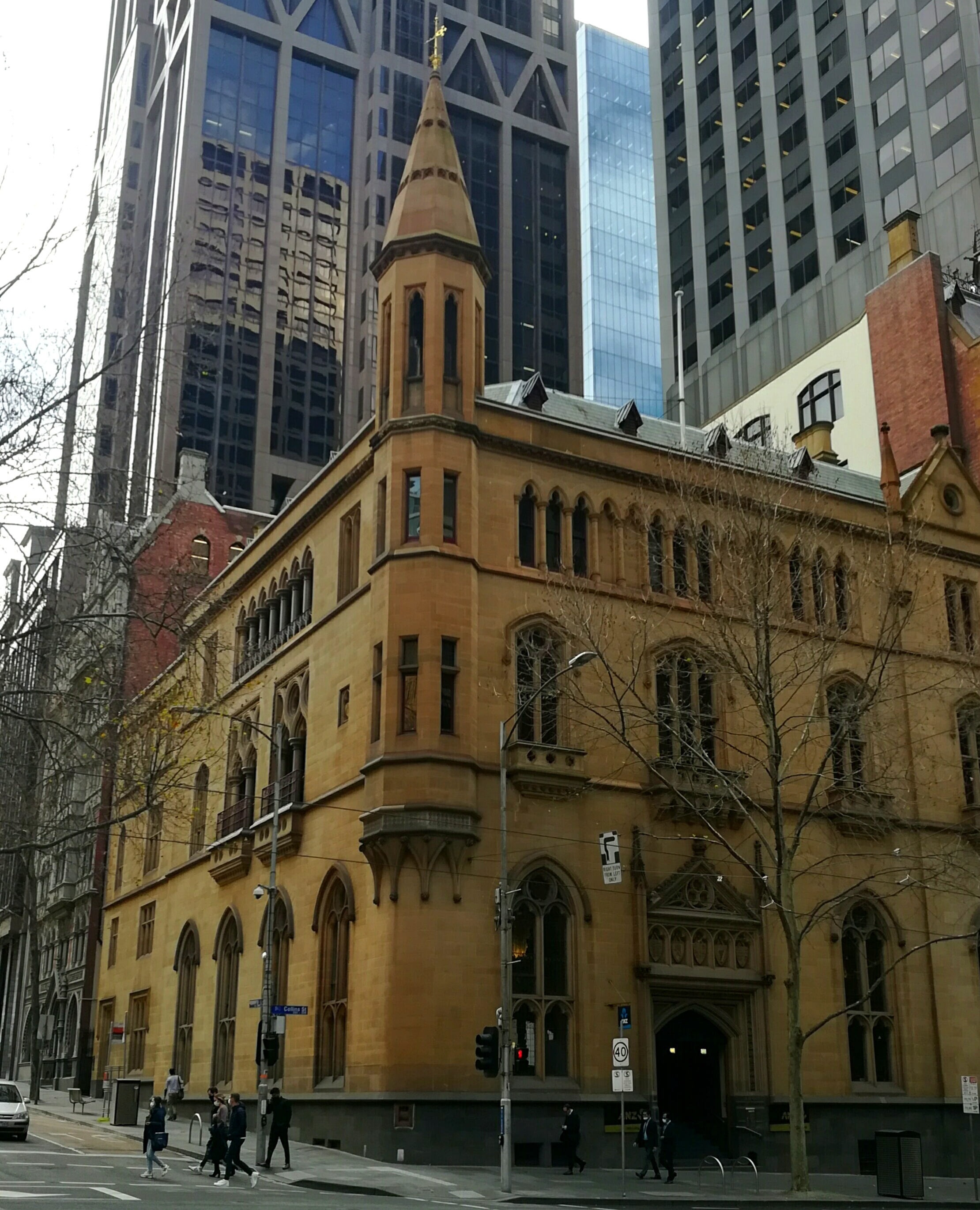
ANZ Bank
