= Siku =

Siku may refer to:

- Siku (instrument), a kind of pan flute from the Andes
- Siku (Bolivia), a mountain in the Bolivian Andes
- Siku Toys, a German brand of toy vehicles
- Siku (comics), an artist
- Siku (polar bear), a bear cub who became an overnight online sensation
- Siku Quanshu, a compendium of Chinese literature completed in 1782
- Secoo, Chinese online retailer
- Siku Allooloo, indigenous writer
- Siku Ya Bibi (Day of the Lady)
- Siku Njema, a Swahili novel
