= Canali =

Italian luxury menswear company

- Industry: Tailors
- Founded: Italy 1934
- Founder: The Canali family
- Headquarters: Sovico, Italy
- Area served: Worldwide
- Key people: Paolo Canali (Sales & Marketing Director); Andrea Pompilio (Creative Consultant); Elisabetta Canali (Global Communication Director)
- Products: Luxury Men's Clothing
- Number of employees: 1,500
- Website: www.canali.com

Canali is an Italian luxury menswear brand founded in 1934.

== History ==
Canali was founded in 1934 by the Canali brothers Giovanni, a fabric magnate, and Giacomo, a tailor.

In the 1950s, the ownership of Canali passed on to the second generation of the family. In the 1970s, Canali was the first Italian tailor to introduce mechanised cutting machines. In 1980, 50% of its sales were international.

In 2007, the company abandoned its family-managed policy.

In 2010, New York Yankees pitcher Mariano Rivera was the spokesmodel for a Canali advertisement campaign, the first time the brand used an athlete for advertising purposes. In 2014, Canali opened its first store in Spain, in Madrid, and signed a franchise deal with the Spanish company Yusty. In 2015, Canali opened a store in Washington, DC. In December 2015, Canali opened its online shop.

In October 2017, Canali closed the Carate Brianza factory and dismissed its 134 employees. In November 2017, the company denied rumors it was looking for a buyer. In September 2018, Canali entered the Chinese ecommerce market through a partnership with Secoo. Following the outbreak of the coronavirus pandemic, Canali changed its creative strategy for more "homey", casual designs to fit the work-from-home trend.

In 2026, Canali appointed long-time Brunello Cucinelli designer Alessio Lillocci to creative director; his first collection will be spring 2027.

== Description ==
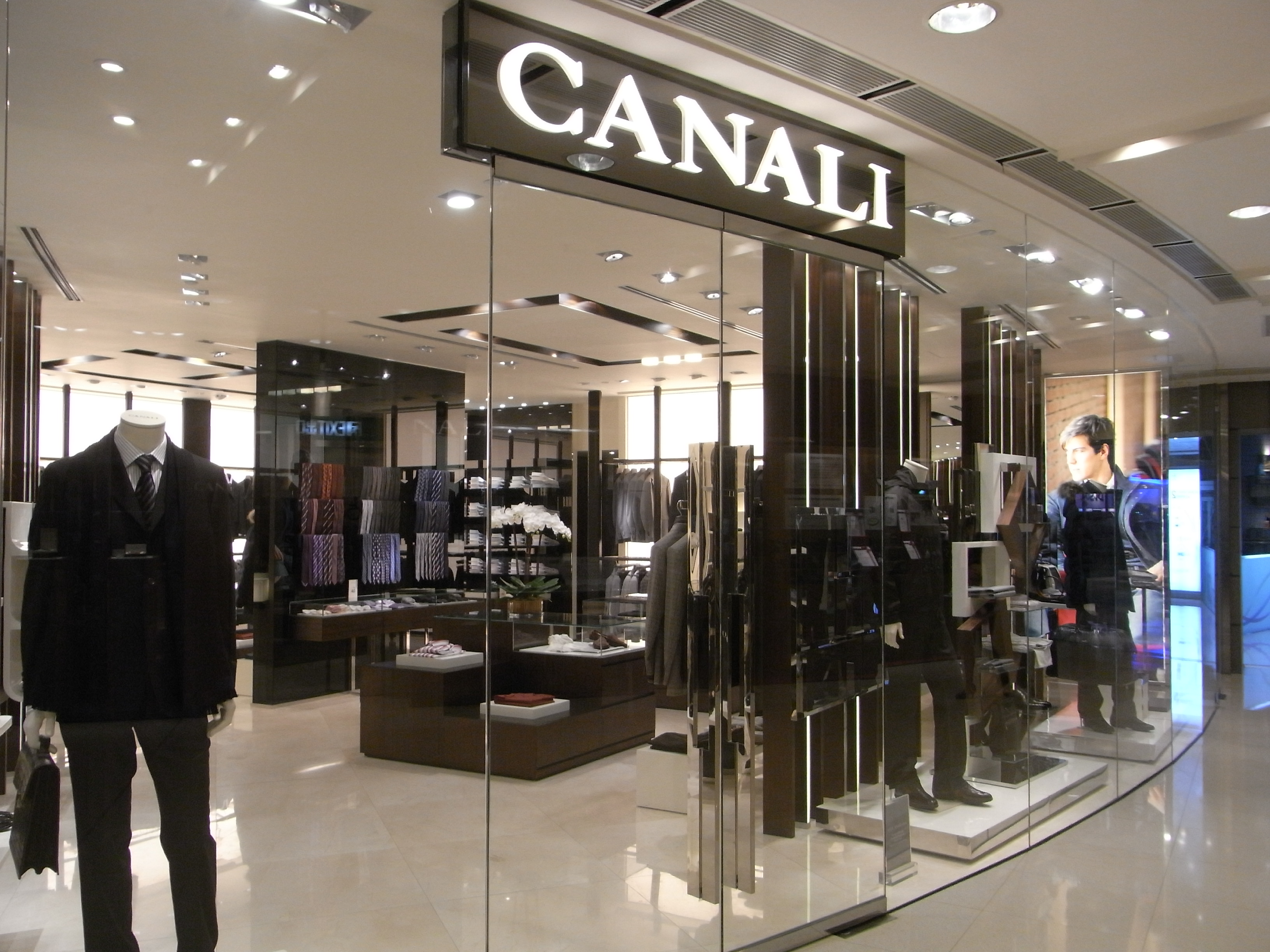
A shop of Canali at IFC Mall, Hong Kong

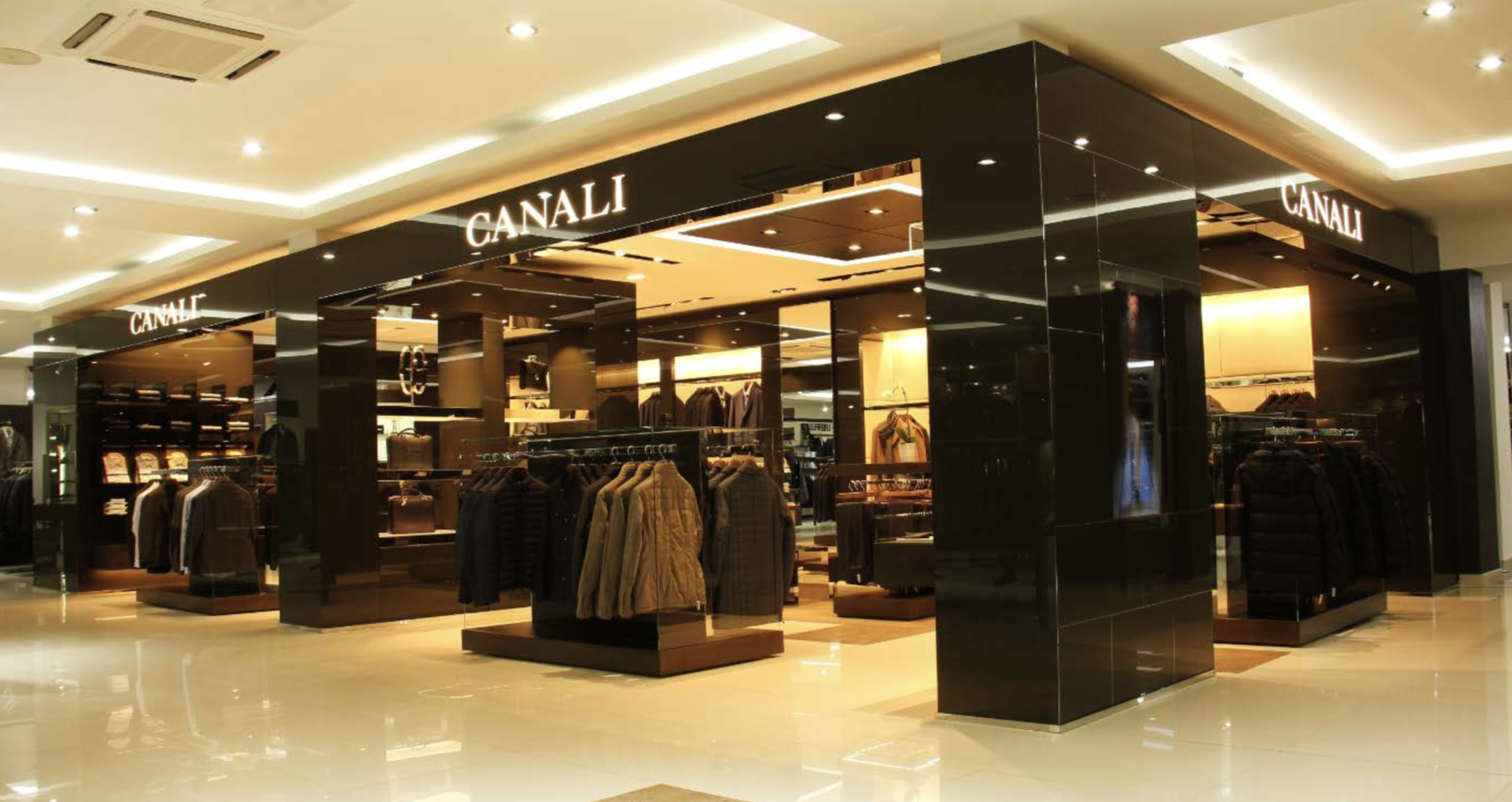
Canali shop-in-shop in Mongolia

Led by the third generation of the family, Canali employs 1,500 people in seven factories in Italy, where it makes about 250,000 individual pieces of clothing annually. In 2012, 87.5% of the total production was exported;

Canali has 180 boutique stores including 52 in China, and is also distributed through a network of 1,000 retail stores worldwide.

Canali provides a Su Misura service which consists of a tailored-made pieces and personalized artistry to make a piece unique.

== In popular culture ==
Canali suits were worn by Gene Hackman in The Firm, Arnold Schwarzenegger in True Lies, and George Clooney in Michael Clayton.

== See also ==
- Made in Italy
- Kiton
- Zegna
- Brioni
