= Federica Marchionni =

Italian businesswoman (born 1971)

- Born: December 23, 1971 (age 54); Rome, Italy
- Occupations: Corporate executive and CEO
- Children: 1

Federica Marchionni (born December 23, 1971) is an Italian businesswoman. Marchionni is the CEO of Global Fashion Agenda, a leadership forum for industry collaboration on fashion sustainability. Marchionni was CEO of American clothing online retailer Lands' End from February 2015 to September 2016. She was the International Chief Executive Officer and Chief Strategy Officer of Secoo, the second largest online luxury retailer in China, from June 2018 until April 2020.

== Early life ==
Marchionni holds a master's degree in business administration from Sapienza University of Rome.

== Career ==
Before moving to the U.S. Marchionni held a position as senior vice president at Ferrari. In February 2015, at Lands' End, Marchionni became the first Italian woman to have led an American company listed on Wall Street when she became CEO of Lands' End. She resigned from her position at Lands' End in September 2016. In July 2018, Marchionni was appointed as CEO of Secoo International and Chief Strategy Officer of Secoo Group.

== Personal life ==
Marchionni is divorced with one son, Gabriele.
