= Secoo =

Chinese e-commerce platform

Secoo Holding Ltd
- Company type: Public
- Website type: E-commerce
- Available in: Chinese, English
- Traded as: Nasdaq: SECO (American depository receipts)
- Founded: 2008
- Headquarters: Beijing, China
- Area served: Worldwide
- Founder: Richard Rixue Li
- Key people: Richard Rixue Li; (Chairman and CEO); Federica Marchionni; (Chief Strategy Officer and International CEO)
- Industry: Internet, online retailing
- Revenue: ▲CN¥5,387 million (US$783.6 million, 2018)
- Net income: ▲CN¥151.83 million (US$22 million, 2018)
- Website: secoo.com
- Users: 27 million

Secoo (Chinese: 寺库; pinyin: Siku) is an online to offline e-commerce platform and the largest online luxury retailer in China.

== History ==
Secoo was launched as Secoo Jimai in 2008, by Richard Rixue Li. Secoo started out with second-hand luxury as its main product. The company hired a staff of jewellery and luxury goods appraisers to verify their products were genuine. By 2011, Li had 10 small shops in the provinces and opened his first flagship "Secoo" store in Beijing. In January 2011, Secoo website was launched.

On July 19, 2011, Secoo received a $10 million investment from IDG Capital. In April 2012, Secoo closed a series B round of funding, raising $30 million from IDG Capital Partners, Yintai Investments and Bertelsmann Asia Investments. In August 2013, the company raised more than $30 million in a Series C funding led by Vangoo Capital Partners, with IDG Capital Partners, Ventech Capital and Crehol Capital participating.

Secoo's mobile app was launched in December 2013. In 2013, the company had shops in Beijing, Shanghai, Chengdu and Hong Kong. By 2014, Secoo became China's largest website for individuals buying and selling their luxury goods. In July 2014, the company raised $100 million in a Series D round of funding from the existing investors and China Media Capital, Ventech China, Crehol Meaningful Capital and Vangoo Investment Partners. In July 2015, the firm completed a $55 million Series E round of funding, led by Ping An Ventures, the venture investment arm of Ping An Insurance. Secoo incorporated representatives companies in the United States (2014) and in Italy (2015). In September 2015, during China Fashion Week, the firm presented its "Fashion+" vision that aimed to open China's market to European fashion designers. In 2016, Secoo opened its first shop in Johor Bahru, Malaysia.

On September 22, 2017, Secoo began trading on the NASDAQ exchange, after launching its IPO and raising about $140 million.

== Collaborations ==
In January 2018, Secoo signed a collaboration contract with Parkson Retail Group, a major Asian-based department store operator. In July, private equity firm L Catterton and JD.com, one of China's largest online retailers, announced they would invest $175 million in Secoo. JD.com aimed to become Secoo's domestic online retail partner, while L Catterton Asia, was set to provide industry expertise. Later in July 2018, the company appointed Federica Marchionni as its chief strategy officer and international CEO. In November 2018, Secoo was among other leading Chinese retailers which de-listed Dolce & Gabbana items, following the firms' controversial ads.

In November 2019, the firm established partnerships with the Italian fashion retailer Luisa Via Roma and Prada.

In June 2020, Qudian announced the purchase of $100 million-worth (or 28.9 percent) of Secoo's shares, making it the largest stockholder in the company.
