= Dandenong Market =

Market in Dandenong, Victoria, Australia

- Interactive map of the Dandenong Market area

General information
- Type: Public food, produce and flea market
- Location: 16-46 Cleeland Street, Dandenong, Victoria, Australia
- Coordinates: 37.9838°S 145.2158°E
- Completed: 1866; 160 years ago

Other information
- Public transit: Bus routes 802, 804, 811, 843, 845, 861, 862, 901, 982

Website
- dandenongmarket.com.au

Dandenong Market is a retail market located in Dandenong, Victoria in the South East of Melbourne, at the corner of Clow and Cleeland Streets. Dandenong Market was established in 1866 and features over 200 market traders spread over 8000 square metres. It attracts an estimated 5 million visitors a year. It is approximately 30 kilometres south-east of Melbourne.

The market, originally located at Lonsdale and McCrae Streets, was relocated to its current location in 1926. As a part of state redevelopment efforts in the City of Greater Dandenong, the market underwent a $26 million refurbishment that was completed in 2011.

The market features traders from approximately 150 nationalities. The market is home to both stalls and shops selling fresh fruit and vegetables, seafood and meat, deli items, bakeries, and flowers. The market also has a large general merchandise area called "the Bazaar", featuring 120 traders selling clothing, jewellery, toys, home ware and computer equipment.

Dandenong Market hosts annual events and festivals, including the Dandenong World Fare (which attracts an estimated 35,000 visitors), the Full Moon festival, and Diwali.

== History ==
Permanent residents in the area first settled in the late 1840s. The town grew rapidly and, in 1863, citizens from the recently established Dandenong Improvement petitioned the local government for approval to establish a public market.

The market was first opened on 10 October 1866. One early advertisement stated that the market would be selling "[a] choice lot of dairy cows, with calves; heifers springing, 50 head store cattle, a quantity of useful horses, fat and store pigs, well-bread rams, poultry, potatoes, and other produce; drays, spring-cart and farming implements, &c." It also noted "Lunch will be provided."

Originally held once every two weeks, the market quickly became a weekly event. By 1870, the market had up to 300 vendors and buyers in attendance. Auctioneers sold livestock, fruit, dairy products, skins, lard, honey, hay and other farm produce. Farmers throughout the La Trobe Valley and Gippsland travelled to Dandenong to buy and sell farm goods. One Gippsland farmer later recounted the difficulties of travelling to Dandenong by road, stating, "After some years, we commenced carting our butter, eggs and bacon to the Dandenong market. The roads were still very bad; the journey always took three strenuous days."

== See also ==
- Prahran Market
- Queen Victoria Market
- South Melbourne Market
