= List of acts of the Parliament of Victoria from 1917 =

This is a list of acts of the Parliament of Victoria, Australia for the year 1917.

== 1917 ==
Short title, or popular name	Citation	Royal assent
Long title
	8 Geo. V. No. 2889	12 July 1917
An Act to apply out of the Consolidated Revenue the sum of One million nine hundred and sixty thousand seven hundred and seventy-six pounds to the service of the year One thousand nine hundred and seventeen and One thousand nine hundred and eighteen.
	8 Geo. V. No. 2892	21 August 1917
An Act to apply out of the Consolidated Revenue the sum of One hundred and thirty thousand six hundred and sixteen pounds to the service of the year One thousand nine hundred and sixteen and One thousand nine hundred and seventeen.
	8 Geo. V. No. 2894	12 September 1917
An Act to apply out of the Consolidated Revenue the sum of One million three hundred and eighteen thousand one hundred and thirty-eight pounds to the service of the year One thousand nine hundred and seventeen and One thousand nine hundred and eighteen.
Governor's Deputy's Powers Act 1917	8 Geo. V. No. 2898	26 September 1917 (Note: This act was reserved for approval by His Majesty.)
An Act to provide for the Exercise by Deputy of certain Powers and Authorities vested in the Governor.
Infectious Diseases Hospital Act 1917	8 Geo. V. No. 2900	9 October 1917
An Act to amend the Infectious Diseases Hospital Acts.
Law Institute Act 1917	8 Geo. V. No. 2903	22 October 1917
An Act to incorporate the Law Institute of Victoria and for other purposes.
Redbank Recreation Reserve Act 1917	8 Geo. V. No. 2910	22 October 1917
An Act to amend the Redbank Recreation Reserve Act 1906. (Note: Redbank Recreation Reserve Act 1906 (6 Edw. VII. No. 2020))
	8 Geo. V. No. 2911	22 October 1917
An Act to apply out of the Consolidated Revenue the sum of Six hundred and seventy-five thousand one hundred and sixty-seven pounds to the service of the year One thousand nine hundred and seventeen and One thousand nine hundred and eighteen.
Melbourne General Market Lands Act 1917 (repealed)	8 Geo. V. No. 2913	22 October 1917
An Act to make further and better provision for the Melbourne General Market and to extend the Area thereof and to provide for the closing of portions of certain Streets in the City of Melbourne and for re-vesting in the Crown certain Lands in the said City and for other purposes. (Repealed by Queen Victoria Market Lands Act 1996 (No. 78 of 1996))
Discharged Soldiers Settlement Act 1917	8 Geo. V. No. 2916	22 October 1917
An Act to make provision for the Settlement of Discharged Soldiers on the Land and for other purposes.
Prahran and Malvern Tramways Trust Act 1917	8 Geo. V. No. 2921	22 October 1917
An Act to increase the Amount which the Prahran and Malvern Tramways Trust may borrow by Way of Overdraft.
Albert Park Land Act 1917	8 Geo. V. No. 2923	22 October 1917
An Act to revoke the Permanent Reservation and Crown Grant of Portion of certain Land situate in the Municipal Districts of the City of South Melbourne and the City of St. Kilda as a site for a Public Park.
Assembly Nominations (War Service) Act 1917	8 Geo. V. No. 2927	22 October 1917
An Act relating to Nominations of Persons on War Service as Candidates at the next ensuing General Election for the Legislative Assembly.
	8 Geo. V. No. 2929	11 December 1917
An Act to apply out of the Consolidated Revenue the sum of One million three hundred and fifty thousand eight hundred and ninety-seven pounds to the service of the year One thousand nine hundred and seventeen and One thousand nine hundred and eighteen.
Children's Courts Act 1917	8 Geo. V. No.	
Clunes Lands Act 1917	8 Geo. V. No.	
Conveyancing Act 1917	8 Geo. V. No.	
County Courts Act 1917	8 Geo. V. No.	
Custody of Infants Act 1917	8 Geo. V. No.	
Fisheries Act 1917	8 Geo. V. No.	
Fruit Act 1917	8 Geo. V. No.	
Game Act 1917	8 Geo. V. No.	
Land Tax Act 1917	8 Geo. V. No.	
Licensing (Registration of Barmaids) Act 1917	8 Geo. V. No.	
Local Government Act 1917	8 Geo. V. No.	
Lunacy Act 1917	8 Geo. V. No.	
Malvern Loan Act 1917	8 Geo. V. No.	
Master-In-Equity's Salary Act 1917	8 Geo. V. No.	
Midwives Act 1917	8 Geo. V. No.	
Port Melbourne Land Act 1917	8 Geo. V. No.	
Public Contracts Act 1917	8 Geo. V. No.	
Public Service Act 1917	8 Geo. V. No.	
Railway Lands Acquisition Act 1917	8 Geo. V. No.	
Registrar-General's Fees Act 1917	8 Geo. V. No.	
Tramway Board Act 1917	8 Geo. V. No.	
Treasury Bonds Act 1917	8 Geo. V. No.	
University Act 1917	8 Geo. V. No.	
Upper Yarra Loan Act 1917	8 Geo. V. No.	
Voting by Post (War Service) Act 1917	8 Geo. V. No.	
Wheat Marketing Act 1917	8 Geo. V. No.	
Wheat Storage Act 1917	8 Geo. V. No.	
Wodonga Land Act 1917	8 Geo. V. No.	

== Sources ==
- "1917 Victorian Historical Acts". AustLII.
