= Tourism in Melbourne =

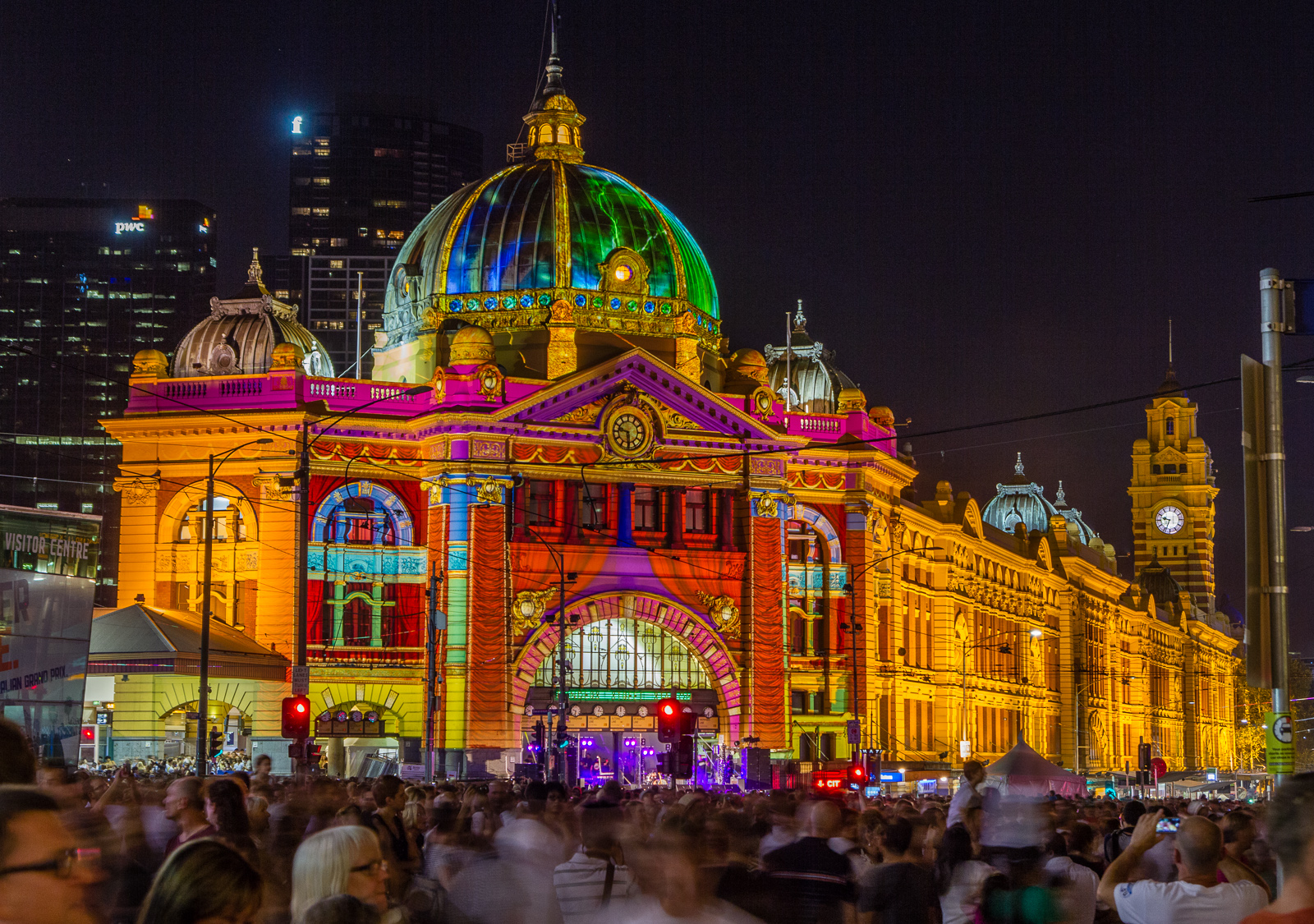
Flinders Street station during White Night 2013

Tourism is a significant industry in the state of Victoria, Australia. The country's second most-populous city, Melbourne was visited by 2.7 million international overnight visitors and 13.5 million domestic overnight visitors during the year ending March 2026.

Melbourne's attractions include sporting events, art galleries, live music, festivals and fashion events that are popular with tourists and locals alike. Named the world's most liveable city from 2011 to 2017, Melbourne's culture and lifestyle have been increasingly promoted internationally.

In its annual survey of readers, the Condé Nast Traveler magazine found that both Melbourne and Auckland were considered the world's friendliest cities in 2014. The magazine described the "wonderful sense of humour" of Melburnians, who live among public art and parks.

== Tourist numbers ==
Official tourism statistics is provided by Tourism Research Australia (TRA). International tourism statistics and domestic tourism estimates are provided via separate measurement programs, namely International Visitor Survey (IVS) and Domestic Tourism Statistics (DoTS) respectively. Due to the transition of methodology in 2025, domestic visitor numbers to Melbourne before 2025 are not available. For international visitor numbers, results between 2020 to 2023 are not publishable due to data collection disruption caused by COVID-19.

Visitors	2017	2018	2019	2020-23	2024	2025
International (overnight)	2,731,000	2,889,000	2,967,000	N/A	2,552,000	2,652,000
Domestic (overnight)	N/A	N/A	N/A	N/A	N/A	13,538,000

== Popular sites ==
Melbourne's most popular tourist sites for fiscal year ending June 2018:

Rank	Attraction	Description	Visitor number (2019)	Visitor percentage (2019)
1	CBD Shopping	Shopping across the city-centre of Melbourne, including shopping centres, streets and arcades such as Emporium Melbourne, Melbourne Central Shopping Centre, Collins Street, Bourke Street Mall, Royal Arcade, 260 Collins, Block Arcade and Chinatown.	5,700,000	17%
2	Southbank Promenade	Southbank Promenade and Southgate Restaurant and Shopping Precinct is one of Melbourne's major entertainment precincts. Southgate's landmark Ophelia sculpture by Deborah Halpern has been used to represent Melbourne in tourism campaigns.	2,900,000	9%
3	Federation Square	A venue for arts, culture and public events on the edge of the city-centre. Also a common meeting place and close to the major transport hub and tourist attraction of Flinders Street railway station, and nearby Birrarung Marr and the Melbourne Cricket Ground.	2,700,000	8%
4	Queen Victoria Market	The largest open air market in the Southern Hemisphere, first opened in 1869. Features an abundance of fresh produce, meat, merchandise and a food hall housed inside notable 19th century buildings.	2,400,000	8%
5	Crown Entertainment Complex	The largest casino complex in the Southern Hemisphere, featuring three hotels, numerous high-end restaurants, cinemas and stores.	2,200,000	7%
6	Docklands & Docklands Stadium	An area of waterside urban renewal featuring shopping, restaurants, corporate offices and Docklands Stadium.	2,000,000	6%
7	St Kilda	Inner Southern suburb featuring St Kilda Beach, Luna Park theme park and the restaurant and shopping districts of Fitzroy Street and Acland Street.	2,000,000	6%
8	National Gallery of Victoria (NGV)	Australias oldest, largest and most visited art museum, housing works by Rembrandt, Claude Monet, Australian Impressionists and featuring the famed Melbourne Winter Masterpieces series.	1,200,000	4%
9	Melbourne Museum, Royal Exhibition Building & Carlton Gardens	The largest museum in the Southern Hemisphere, featuring the world's largest IMAX screen, alongside the cavernous 19th century Exhibition Building, both set in the surroundings of the Carlton Gardens.	845,000	3%
10	Melbourne Cricket Ground	World-famous sporting venue, the 10th-largest stadium in the world, largest in Australia, largest in the Southern Hemisphere, the largest cricket ground by capacity, and has the tallest light towers of any sporting venue.	737,500	2%

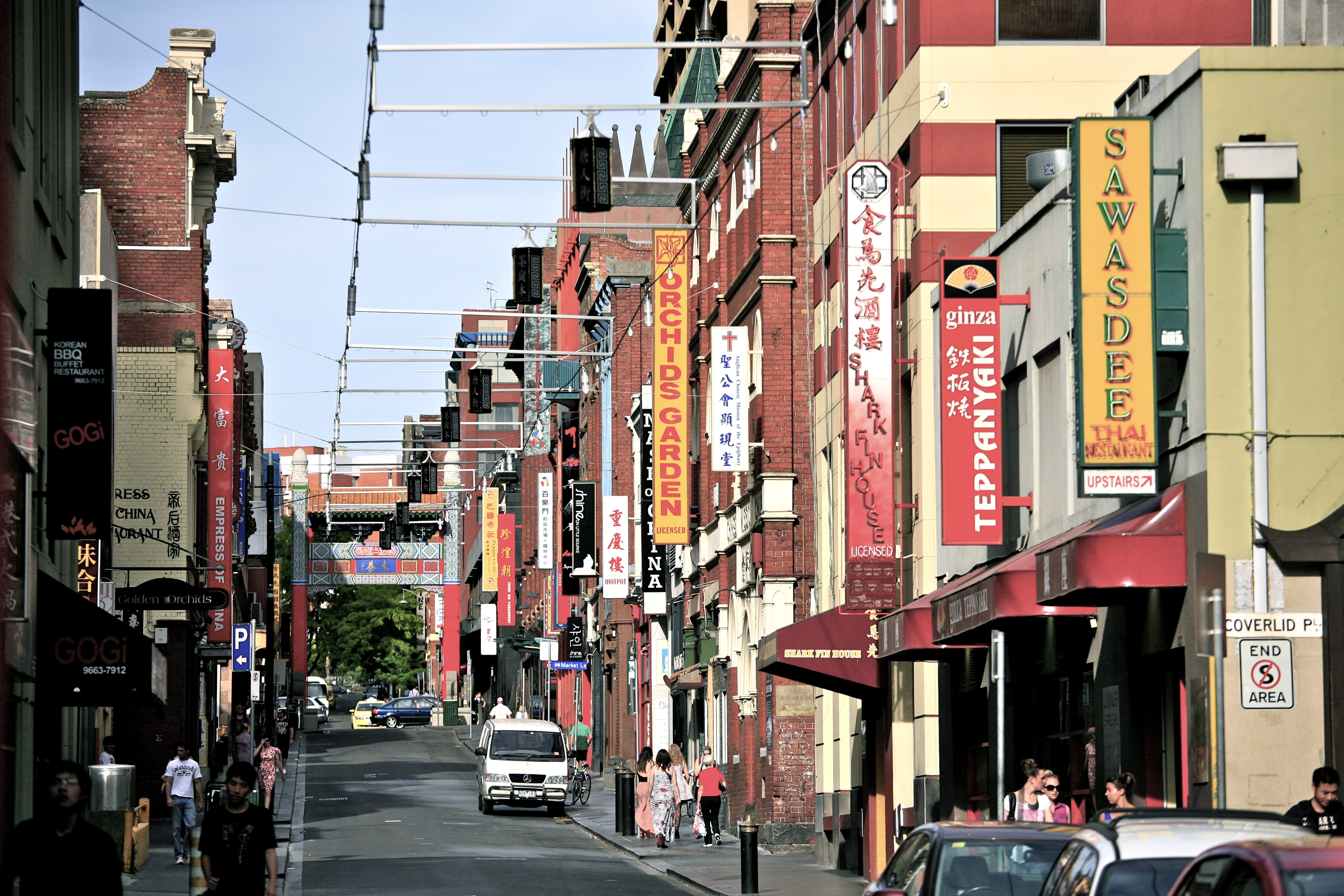
Chinatown, Melbourne

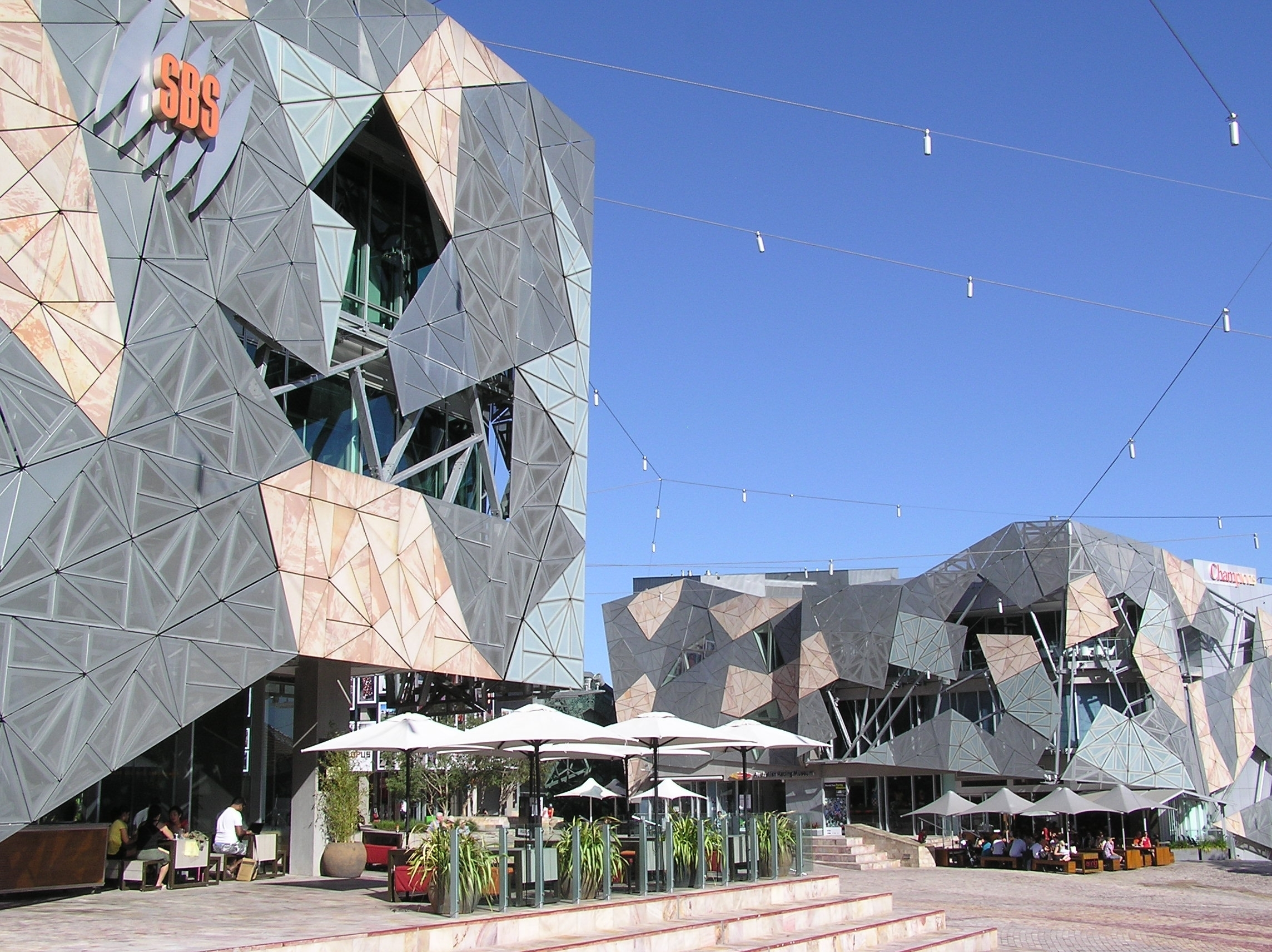
Federation Square Building

Other notable sites:

- Chinatown - the longest continuous Chinese settlement in the Western World and third oldest Chinatown in the world, features numerous restaurants, museums and cultural attractions.
- Eureka Skydeck - the highest viewing platform in the southern hemisphere, located in Eureka Tower.
- Luna Park - an amusement park located on the foreshore of Port Phillip Bay in St Kilda, an inner suburb of Melbourne. It has been operating since 1912.
- Melbourne Aquarium - contains a variety of exhibits showcasing marine wildlife found in the Southern Ocean and the Antarctic.
- Melbourne Convention & Exhibition Centre - built along Southbank in the 1990s as an update for the Royal Exhibition Building, it regularly hosts special conventions and exhibitions.
- Melbourne Park - the home of the Australian Open tennis tournament, one of the four Grand Slams, held every January. Stadiums in Melbourne Park are regularly used as concert venues for the city's music scene.
- Old Melbourne Gaol - built in the 19th century, housed dangerous criminals alongside petty offenders, the homeless and the mentally ill. Australia's most infamous citizen, Ned Kelly, was hanged here and this is now a tourist site commemorating the life of those jailed.
- Shrine of Remembrance on St Kilda Road - one of Australia's largest war memorials and features annual observances of Anzac Day and Remembrance Day, as well as a tomb of the unknown soldier.
- State Library of Victoria - Australia's oldest library and one of the world's first free libraries, famed for its large Domed Reading Room and front lawn.
- Victorian Arts Centre - features a landmark spire, it hosts Opera Australia's Melbourne season, the Melbourne Symphony Orchestra, the Melbourne Theatre Company and the Australian Ballet Company.

== Restaurant & café districts ==
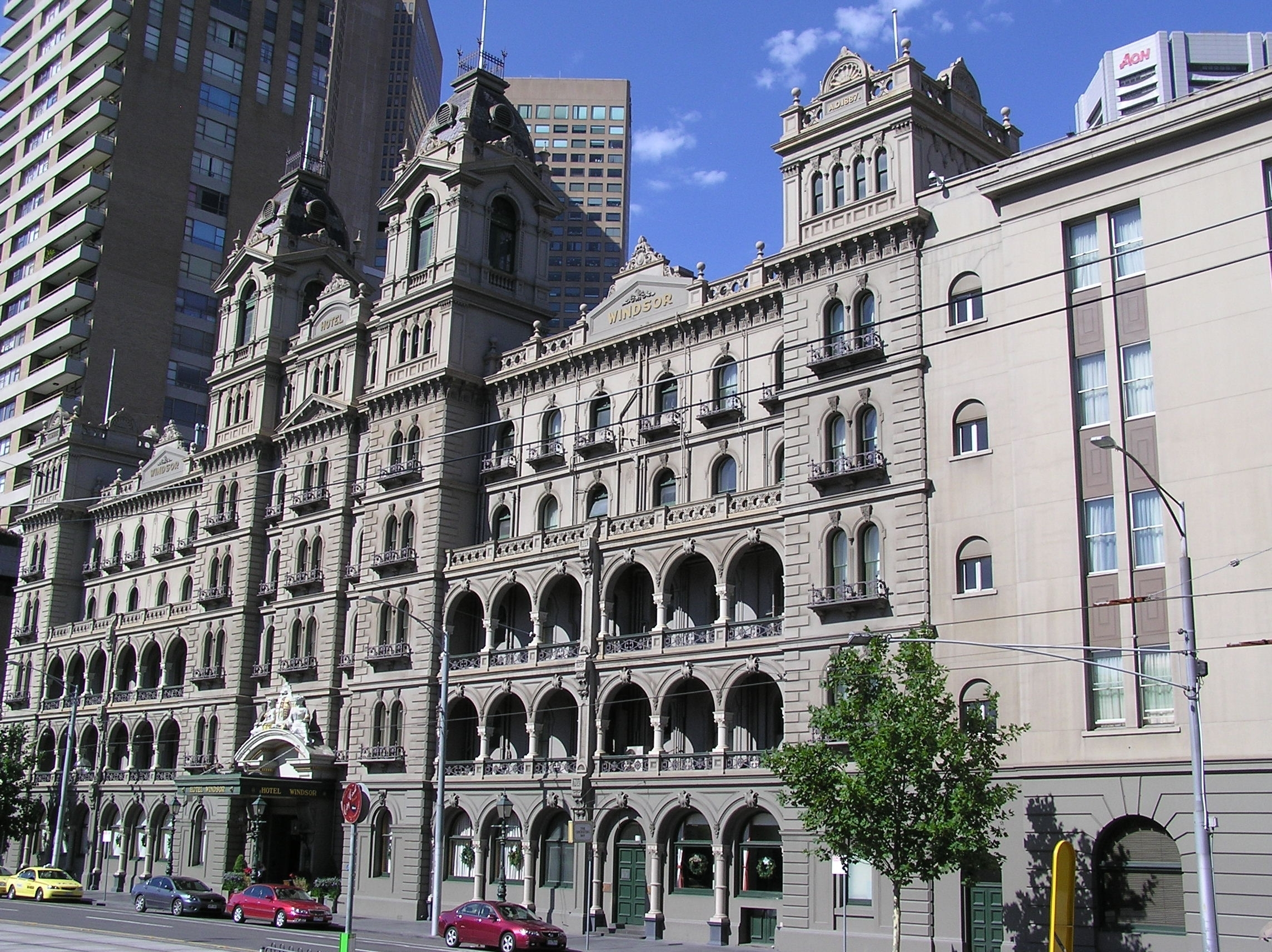
Exterior of the grand 19th century Victorian Hotel Windsor

=== Restaurants ===
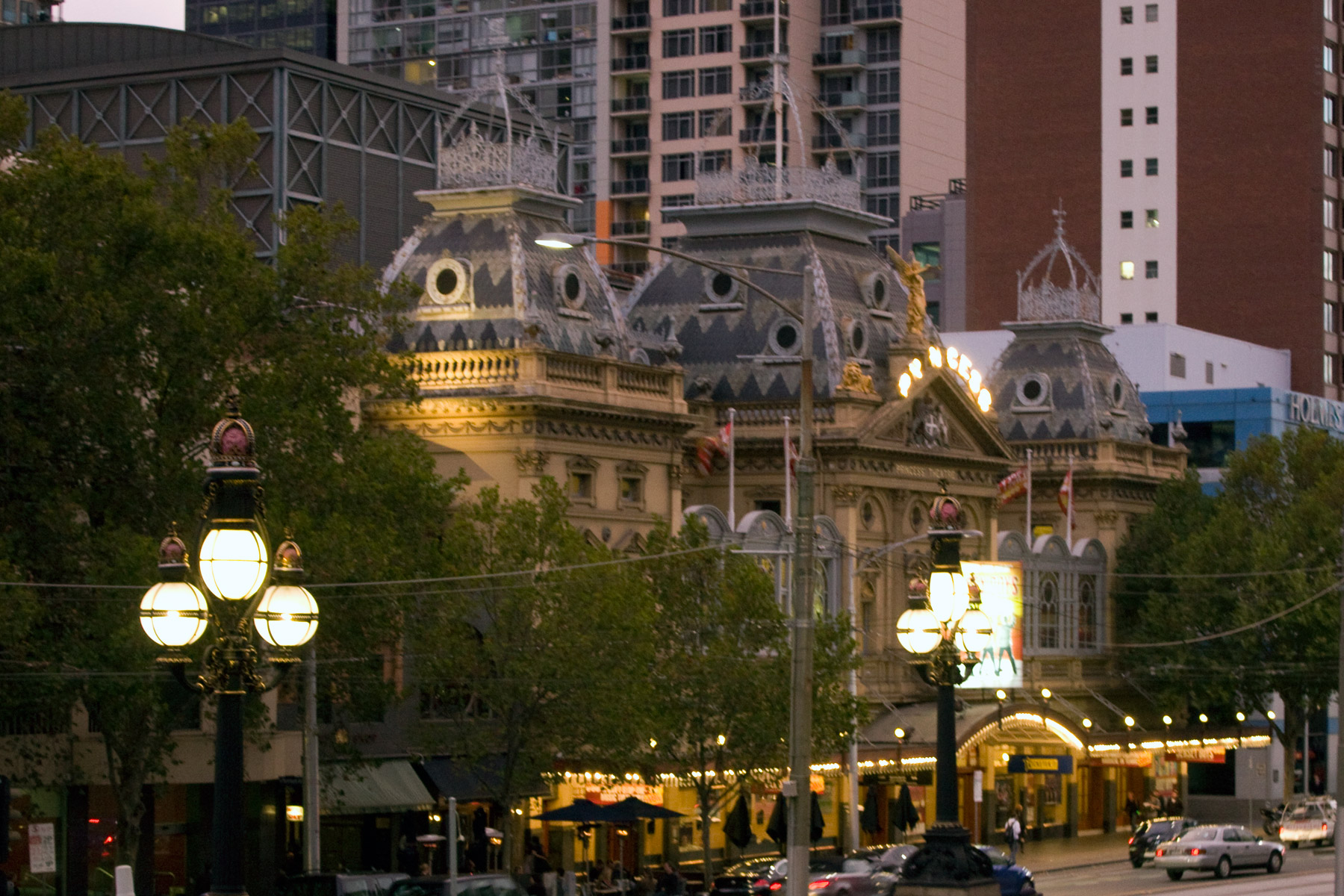
The Princess Theatre

Melbourne is known for its foodie culture and its abundance, variety and quality of restaurants. In part this is due to various waves of immigration and the multicultural fabric of the city. Major restaurant strips are located throughout the inner city and the inner suburbs, including:

- Chinatown - featuring mainly Cantonese cuisine (and increasingly other Asian cuisines) and famous restaurants such as Flower Drum.
- Lygon Street - Melbourne's Little Italy in the inner-northern suburb of Carlton, offers a selection of mainly Italian-influenced food.
- Brunswick Street - in inner-suburban Fitzroy home to a bohemian community of students, artists, and poets with several live music venues, eclectic stores, accompanied by restaurants and cafes serving numerous cuisines.
- Chapel Street - south of the city is a popular destination for fashionable clothes shopping, eating and entertainment. The long street contains commercial areas providing goods and services for local residents. Chapel Street intersects with Toorak Road, itself offering entertainment, food and shops.
- Glenferrie Road - east of the city in the inner suburban Malvern has a wide mix of different cuisines including Indian, Malaysian, Thai and Japanese. The street intersects with High Street in Armadale which also has a mix of antique shops, cafes and restaurants.
- Glen Huntly Road - south east of the city in inner suburban Elsternwick is a busy strip that offers a wide range of different restaurant cuisines including Chinese, Malaysian Indian, Thai, and some Middle Eastern cuisines.
- Victoria Street - known as Melbourne's Little Saigon featuring numerous Vietnamese restaurants (and increasingly Thai, Korean and Japanese).
- Nelson Place - a waterside street in Williamstown known for weekend breakfasts, brunches and lunches.

=== Coffee Culture ===
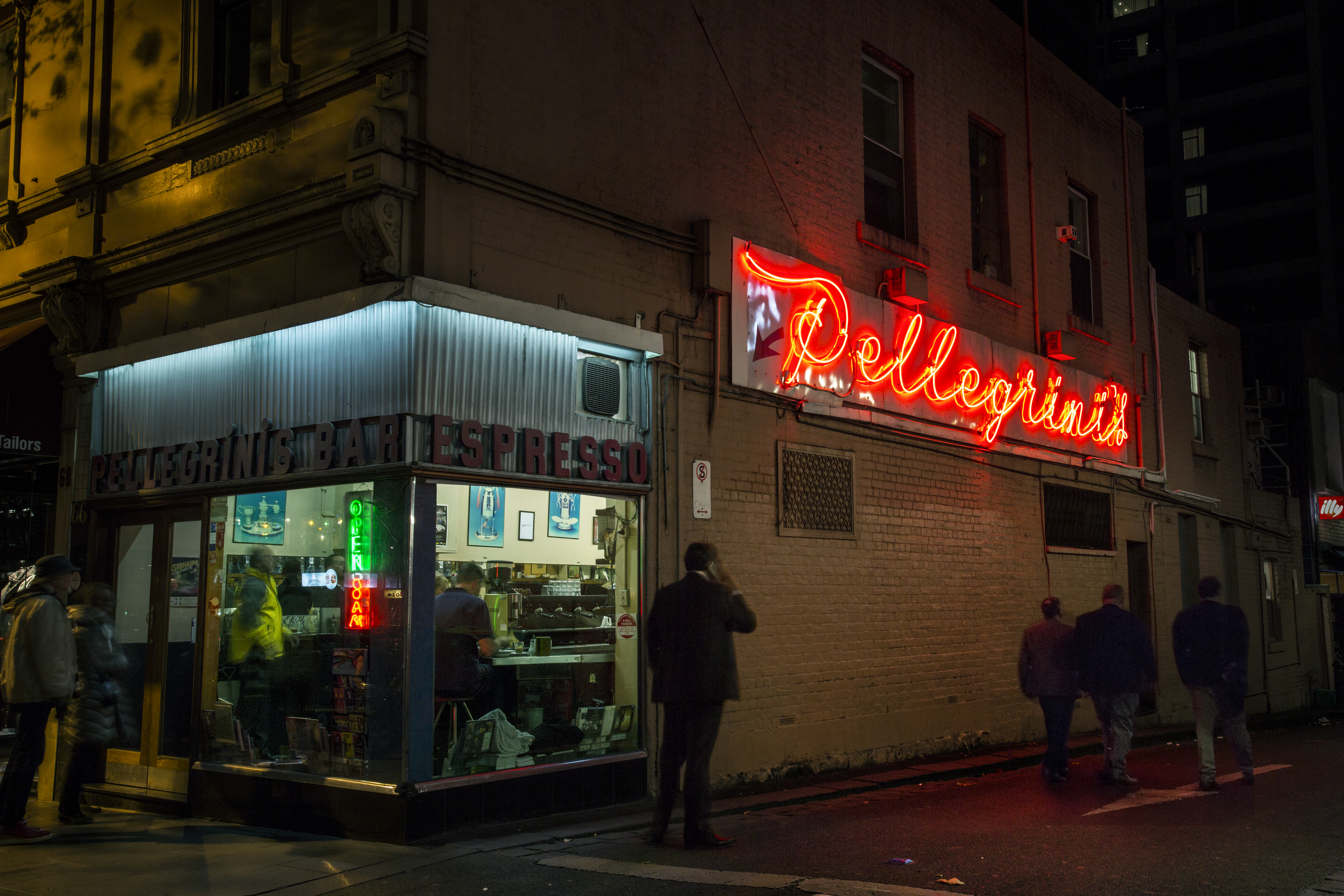
Pellegrini's Espresso Bar, Bourke Street

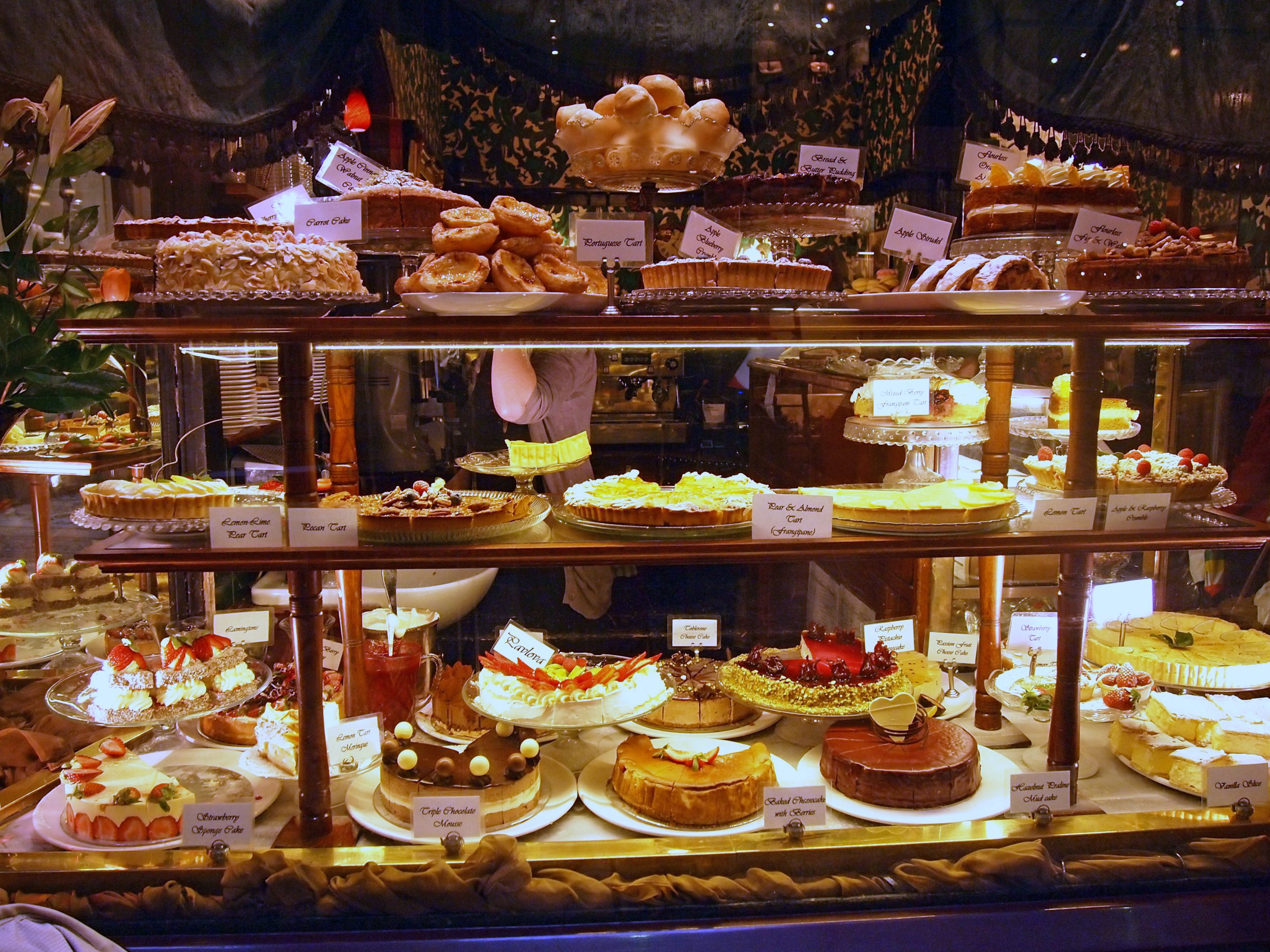
Storefront window of a tea house on Collins Street displaying cakes and pastries

Melbourne is also known as a coffee-obsessed city, with the flat white an Australian-invented favourite (though the flat white is believed to have originated in Sydney). The city's coffee culture is largely a result of Italian immigration, but has evolved into a local passion over time. It is often claimed that Pellegrini's Espresso Bar, on Bourke Street, was the first cafe to use the espresso machine in Melbourne. The city centre features a ubiquitous cafe culture, with high concentrations of cafés around a few famous alleys, including:

- Block Arcade
- Degraves Street
- Hardware Lane

Many inner suburbs also feature streets famous for cafes, including:

- Collingwood's Smith Street
- Fitzroy's Brunswick Street, Gertrude Street and Johnson Street
- Richmond's Bridge Road and Victoria Street
- South Yarra's Chapel Street and Greville Street
- Southbank's Southgate
- St Kilda's Carlisle Street and Acland Street

== Bars, pubs and nightlife ==
Melbourne features Australia's most active nightlife scene with pubs, bars, and nightclubs spread throughout the city and inner suburbs.

The CBD contains a wide variety of venues, from Irish pubs and more traditional Australian hotels, through to wine bars, jazz venues on Bennetts Lane, nightclubs and dance venues (where the Melbourne Shuffle was born). Venues are often located down Melbourne's famous network of laneways and alleys.

Well-known pub, bar and nightclub districts include:

- Brunswick Street and its surrounding area features an array of rock and grunge venues.
- King Street, on the Western side of the CBD, traditionally a nightclub strip with some remaining, but many are now exotic dancing venues.
- Chapel Street in Prahran features many bars and nightclubs.
- St Kilda- houses several huge music venues including the famous Esplanade Hotel (known as 'the Espy'), the Prince of Wales, and the Palais Theatre.

Melbourne also has a vibrant gay community, with gay and gay-friendly bars across the city. It is mostly concentrated on two gay villages – Commercial Rd, South Yarra and Smith St, Collingwood, but there are also gay bars and clubs in St Kilda, Fitzroy, Richmond and Yarraville.

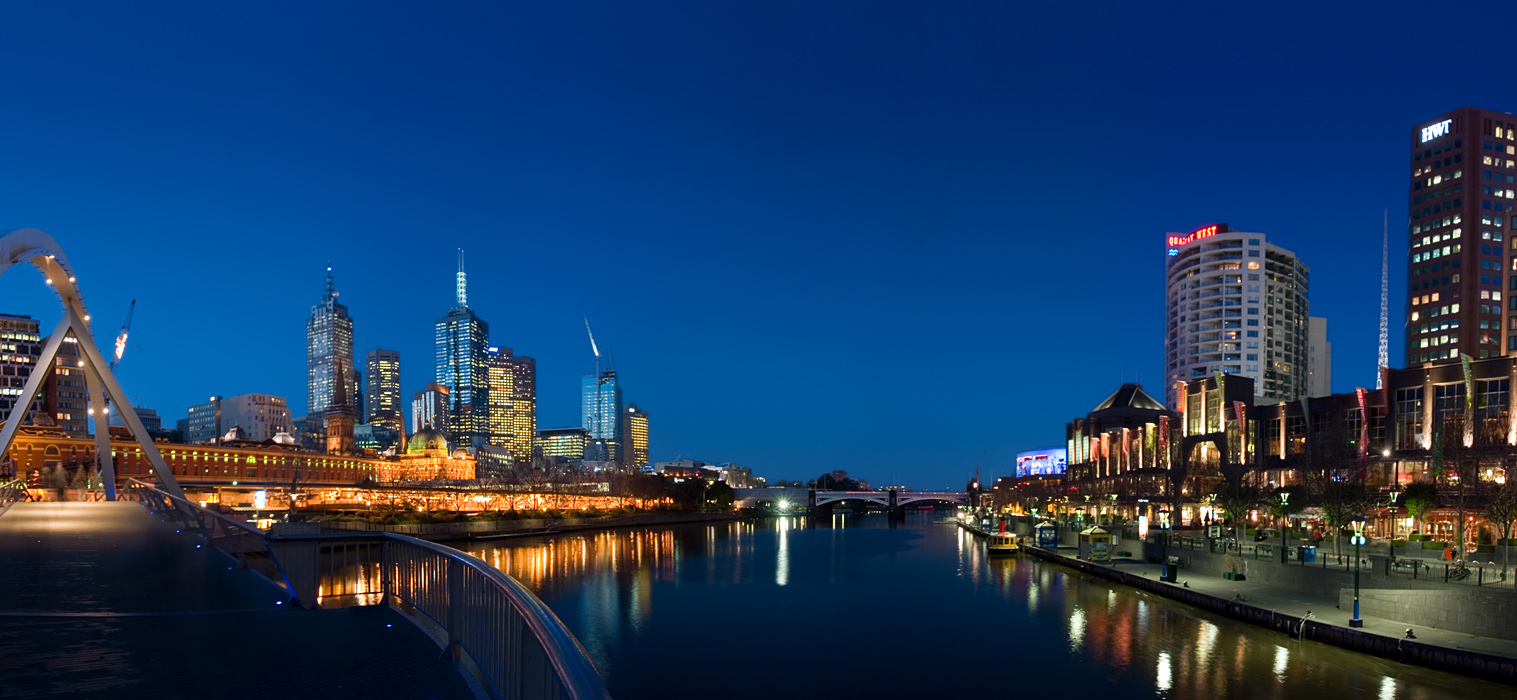
The Yarra River by night, with the city centre to the left and Southbank to the right

== Close to Melbourne ==
There aremany things to see outside Melbourne proper but still within a day trip of Melbourne:

- The Yarra Valley region, producer of high-quality wine and with rainforest scenery nearby.
- The Mornington Peninsula, with its wineries, beaches and the Arthus Seat lookout.
- The Surf Coast near Geelong, with its surf beaches and views of the Great Ocean Road (Voted the world's best road trip in 2003).
- Ballarat, a small regional city once the centre of the gold rush and site of the Eureka Stockade.
- Bendigo, another regional city popularised by Victoria's gold rush.
- Phillip Island, home of the Australian Motorcycle Grand Prix, also has one of the few easily accessible colonies of little penguins.
- French Island in Western Port Bay
- Geelong, 80 kilometres (50 mi) down the Princes Hwy is the gateway to many of Australia's tourist destinations such as the Great Ocean Road, Twelve Apostles and Bells Beach. Geelong is famous for its world class waterfront on Corio Bay. One of the largest waterfront redevelopments ever undertaken in Australia, the Geelong Waterfront includes Cunningham Pier featuring a Carousel Pavilion, and the art-deco bathing area at Eastern Beach.
- Gippsland region, home of the Gourmet Deli Tours, the Gippsland Lakes, Wilsons Promontory (with South Point, the most southerly point of the Australian mainland), and many picturesque towns such as Sale, Foster, Bairnsdale, Lakes Entrance and Warragul – one of the richest dairy farming areas in Australia. The ghost town of Walhalla is filled with goldmining memorabilia.
- Dandenong Ranges are famous for the Puffing Billy steam train in Belgrave, a large suburb of Melbourne, the Dandenong Ranges are located less than 30 kilometres (19 mi) from Melbourne with the townships of Mount Dandenong, Olinda, Upwey, Sassafrass and the commercial, residential and large "capitals", Belgrave and Ferntree Gully, the Dandenongs are also known for the view of the sun setting over Melbourne.

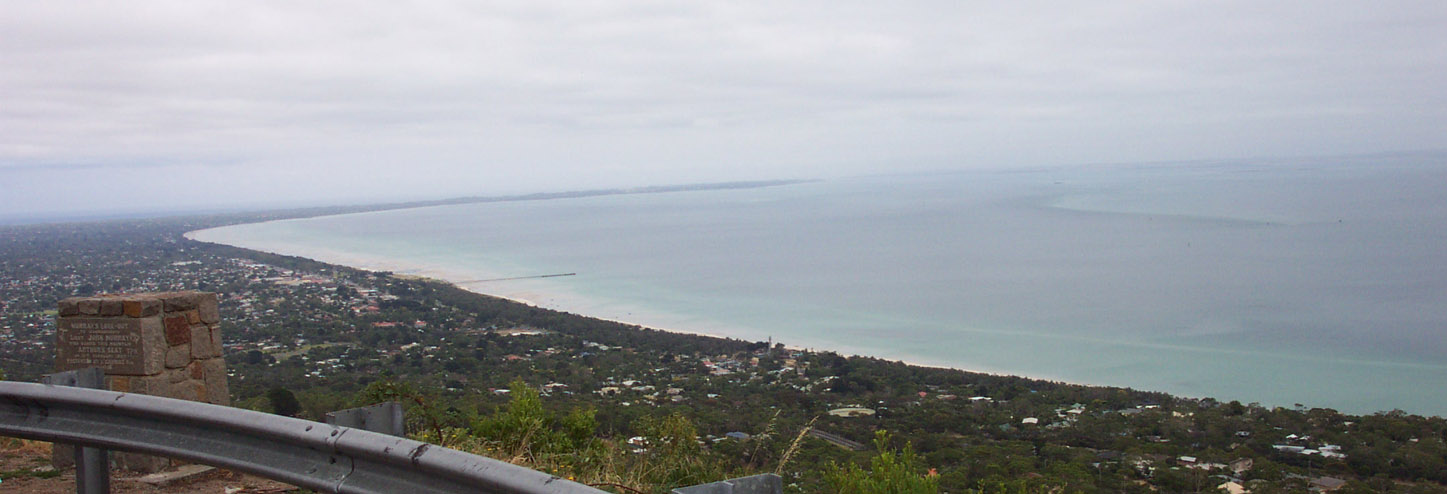
A view of the Mornington Peninsula from the lookout at Arthurs Seat

== Australian tourism ==
Melbourne's domestic tourist spend per capita exceeded Sydney for the first time in 2008; however a spokesman for the NSW Tourism Minister stated that Melbourne earned less in terms of overall tourist revenue.

== See also ==
- List of museums in Melbourne
- Media in Melbourne
- Tourism in Australia
