= Queen Victoria Market =

Open-air street market in Melbourne, Victoria, Australia

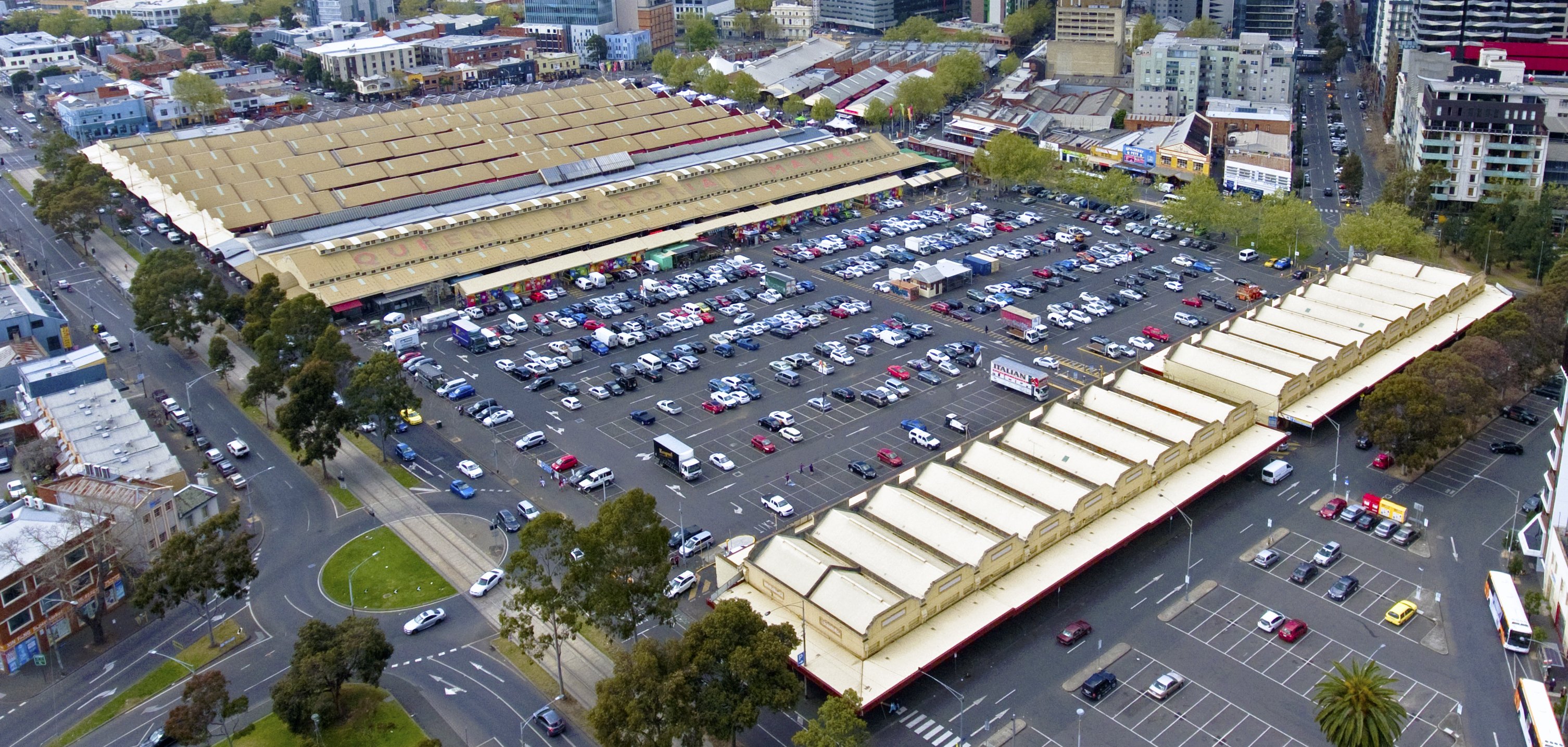
- Aerial photograph of Queen Victoria Market

General information
- Type: Public food, produce and flea market
- Location: 65-159 Victoria Street, Melbourne, Victoria, Australia
- Coordinates: 37.8070°S 144.9569°E
- Completed: 1878; 148 years ago
- Owner: Queen Victoria Market Pty Ltd

Other information
- Public transit: Queen Victoria Market/Elizabeth St (#7): 19, 57, 59 Queen Victoria Market/Peel St (#9): 58 Bus route 220

Website
- qvm.com.au

Australian National Heritage List
- Official name: Queen Victoria Market
- Type: Historic
- Criteria: c, d
- Designated: 23 July 2018; 8 years ago
- Reference no.: 106277

Victorian Heritage Register
- Type: State Registered Place
- Criteria: a, c, d, g
- Designated: 3 April 1989; 37 years ago
- Reference no.: VHR H0734
- Heritage Overlay number: HO496

The Queen Victoria Market (also known colloquially as the Vic Market or Queen Vic) is a major landmark and public marketplace in the central business district (CBD) of Melbourne, Victoria, Australia. Covering over seven hectares (17 acres), it is the largest open air market in the Southern Hemisphere.

Constructed in stages from the 1860s and officially opened in 1878, the Queen Victoria Market is the last remaining major market in the CBD, and along with Prahran Market and South Melbourne Market, the last of the city's Victorian era markets still operating. It is listed on both the Victorian Heritage Register and the National Heritage List, and is one of Melbourne's major tourist sites, attracting approximately ten million visitors annually.

== History ==
=== Earlier markets in Melbourne ===
The Western Market was Melbourne's first official fruit and vegetable market, established in 1841, six years after the city's founding. It grew to take up an entire block bounded by Market, Collins and William streets in the central business district. The expansion of Melbourne to the east led to the establishment of the Eastern Market in the late 1840s, which quickly overtook the Western Market in popularity.

=== Old Melbourne Cemetery ===
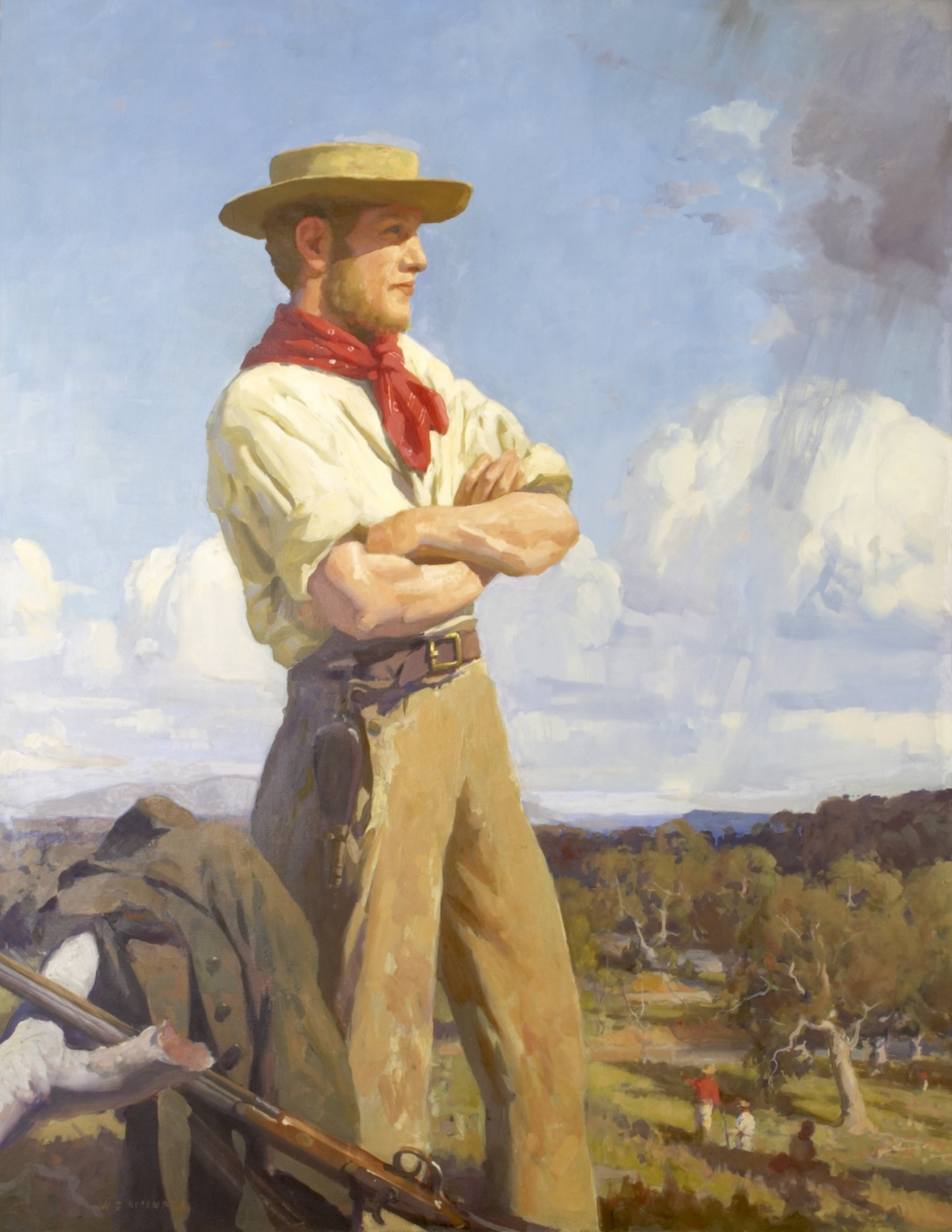
Melbourne founder John Batman was among the early colonists buried on the current site of the market.

The Queen Victoria Market was built and expanded over the site of the Old Melbourne Cemetery, which was the first British burial ground in Melbourne. Many of Melbourne's early settlers were buried there, including the founder of the city John Batman.

The cemetery was officially closed to burials in 1854 but some legal and many illegal burials continued until 1917, and in 1920 it was estimated that a total of 10,000 graves existed on the site, though the exact number is unknown since the cemetery records were lost in a fire in 1864.

=== Development into a market district ===
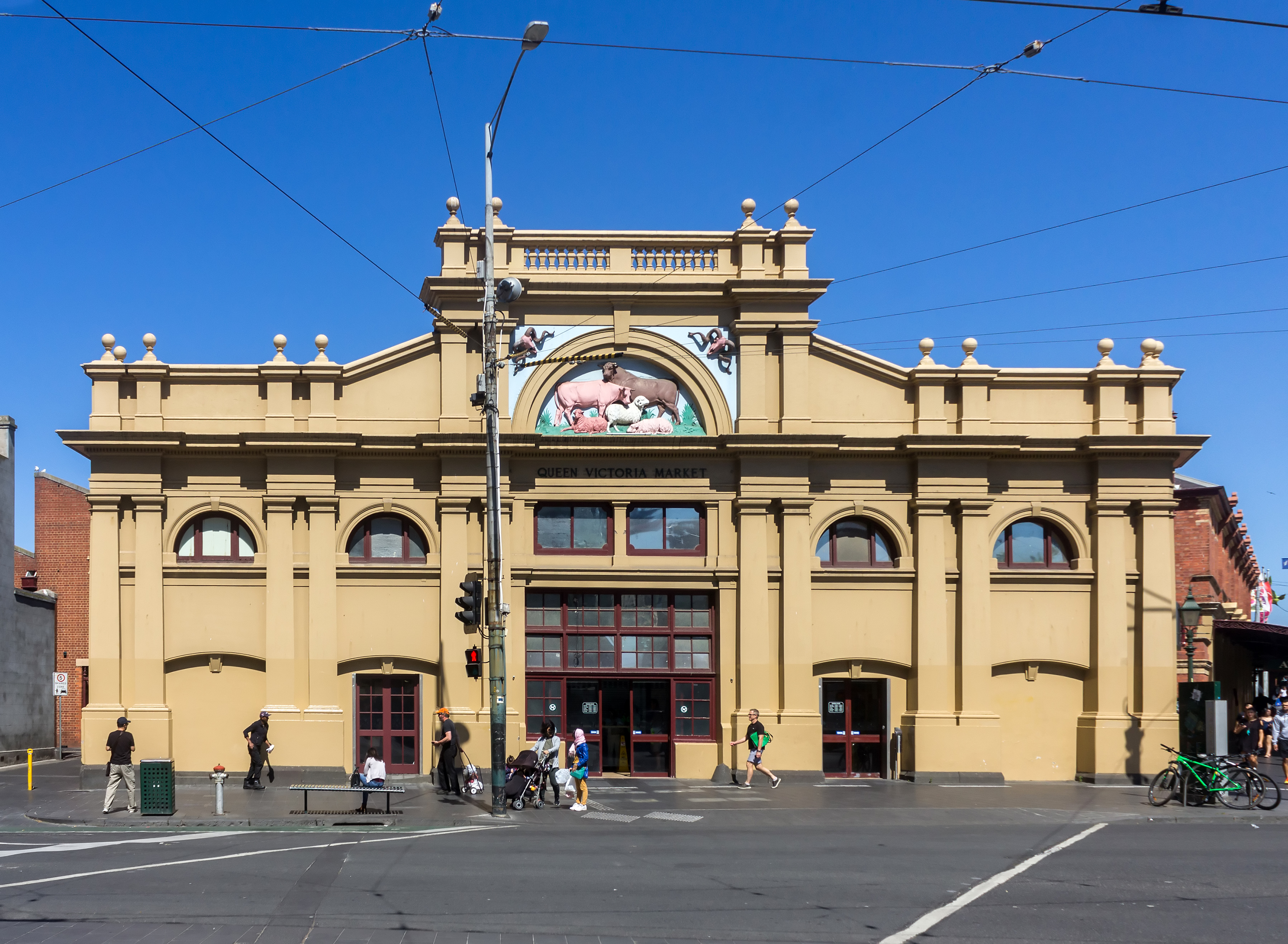
Built in 1868, the Meat and Fish Hall is the oldest surviving building at the market.

After the cemetery's partial closure, a number of small wholesale and retail markets were established around the site in the late 1850s to serve Melbourne's rapidly growing population. The Lower Market (Deli Hall, Meat and Fish Hall, and H and I sheds) was originally set aside in 1857 for a fruit and vegetable market due to over-crowding at the Eastern Market. However, the location was contested due to its proximity to the cemetery, and proved unpopular with market gardeners who refused to use the space. This resulted in it serving as a livestock and hay market (the Meat Market Reserve) until 1867, when a substantial brick building (now the Meat and Fish Hall) was erected on the corner of Elizabeth and Victoria streets.

The Victorian Parliament passed the Melbourne General Market Site Act 1877 (41 Vict. No. 572) officially gazetting the Old Melbourne Cemetery site as land to be reserved and developed into markets. A year later the part of the cemetery on the corner of Queen and Victoria streets where the unconsecrated burials of Aboriginal people and executed criminals were located, was the first area to be built upon. Before construction started, 28 skeletons were exhumed and re-interred at the Melbourne General Cemetery, including those of three Aboriginal men who had been executed in the 1840s.

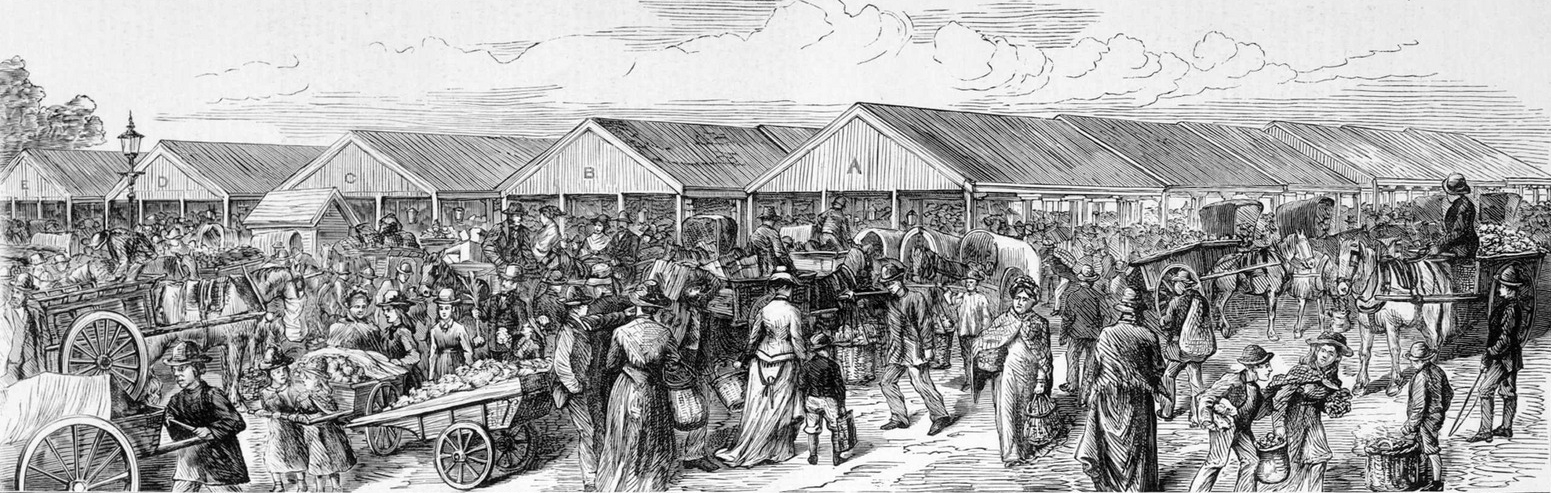
A panoramic view of the market, 1878

=== Official opening of Queen Victoria Market ===
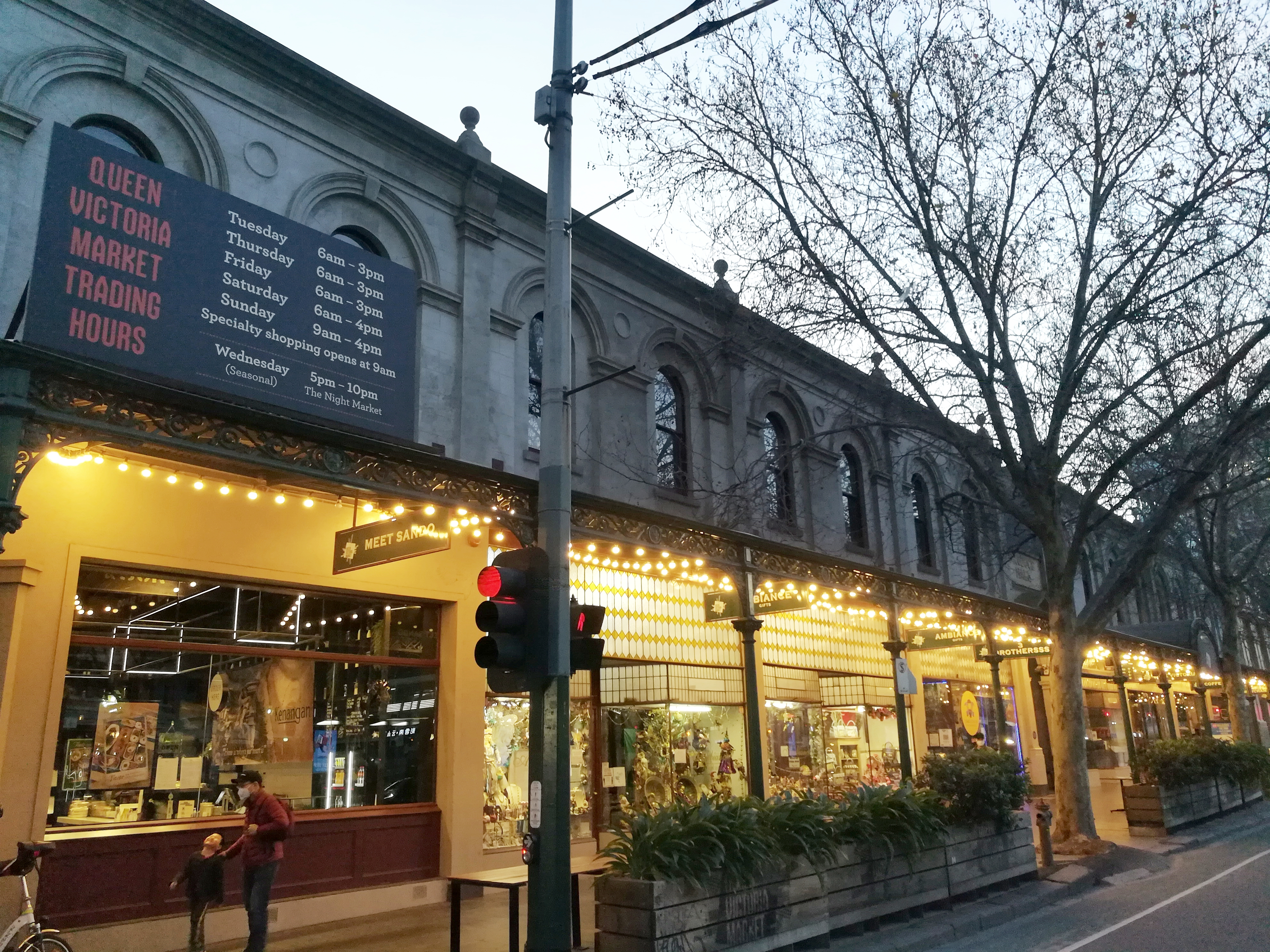
Elizabeth Street shopfronts, built in 1880

The Queen Victoria Market officially opened in March 1878, and it quickly expanded into wholesale and retail fruit and vegetable trading, which prompted the construction of G, H, I and J sheds. Shops were built along Elizabeth Street in 1880, and in 1884 the well-known Meat and Fish Hall façade was constructed.

By 1898, an average of 300 carts loaded with fresh vegetables and fruit from market gardens to the south east of the city arrived twice a week during the summer for sale in the market.

=== Expansion ===
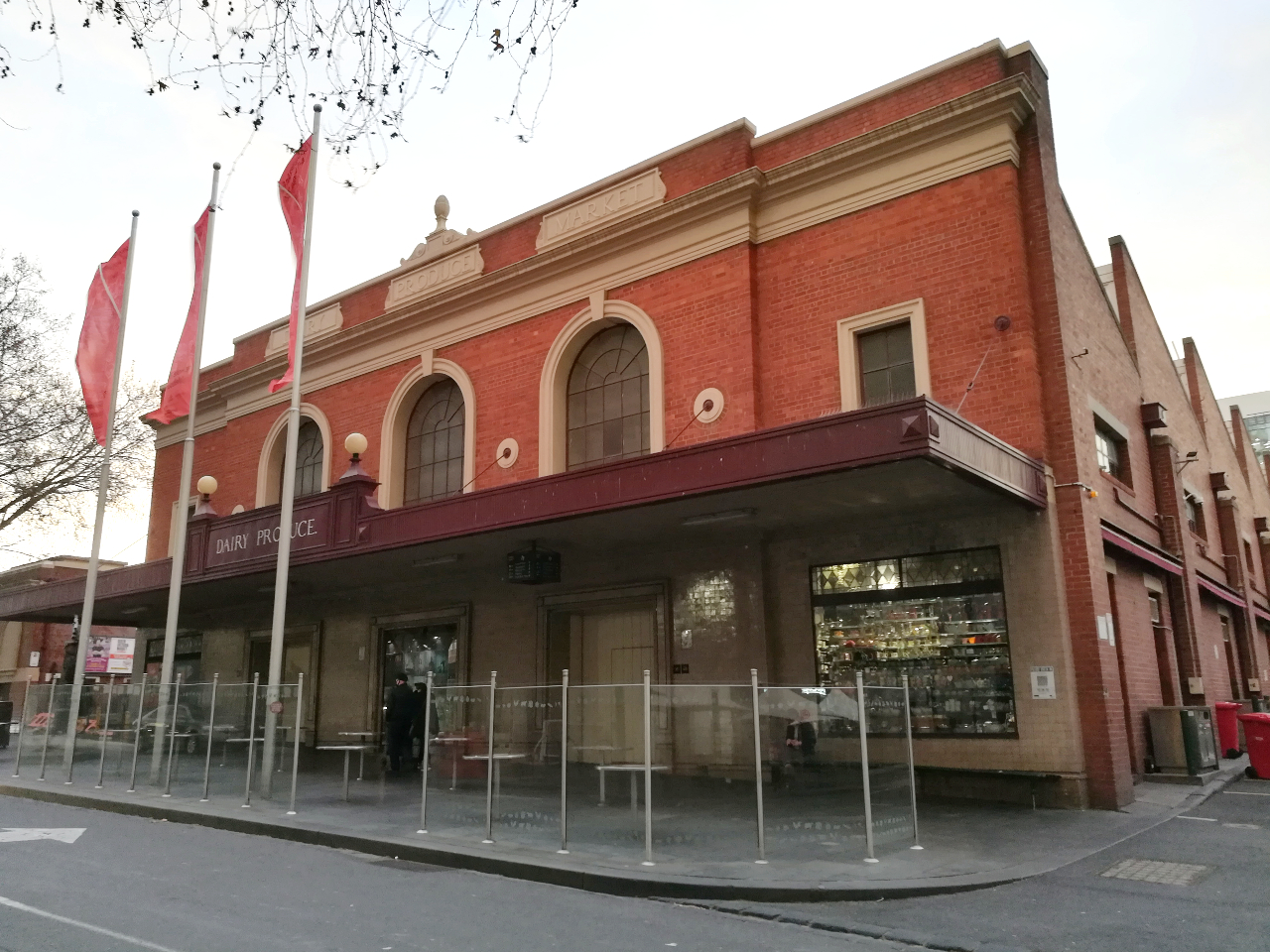
Dairy Produce Hall, Franklin Street

In 1920, work to expand the markets to Peel Street were commenced. This involved building over the section of the old cemetery allocated for Jewish burials and also the graves of the first British colonists. Considerable public protest occurred to attempt to halt the development. Sir John Monash, who was Jewish, stated that if the project went ahead it "would stamp Australians as a people devoid of sentiment and morality." A petition to the Prince of Wales to intervene in the development proved unsuccessful.

Work proceeded and between 1920 and 1922, 914 bodies were exhumed and re-buried in other cemeteries around Melbourne, notably at the new Fawkner Cemetery. By 1923 most of the remains of the prominent early settlers had been relocated, and the rest of the Old Melbourne Cemetery was ploughed up and prepared for the market expansion. Sheds K–L and M were built on part of the cleared cemetery, and when completed, the market had grown to occupy two city blocks: one rectangular block bounded by Victoria, Peel, Franklin and Elizabeth streets, and one eastern irregular block bounded by Queen, Victoria, Elizabeth and Therry streets.

In 1930, sixty brick stores were built at the Franklin Street end to house wholesale agents and merchants. However, this was short-lived due allegations of corruption and racketeering, and the findings of a royal commission led to the relocation of the Wholesale Market to Footscray in 1969. All that remains today of these stores is a row of shopfronts along Franklin Street.

=== Threats of demolition ===
A 1964 City of Melbourne report advocated for redevelopment of the site as a 1200 space car park, which would have become the largest in the city centre.

The separation of the Wholesale Market from the Retail Market led to a plan to redevelop the Queen Victoria Market site into a trade centre, office and hotel complex in the 1970s. However, public outcry and a green ban prevented this and resulted in the Market being classified by the National Trust. The market site and its buildings were listed on the Historic Buildings Register.

=== Present day ===
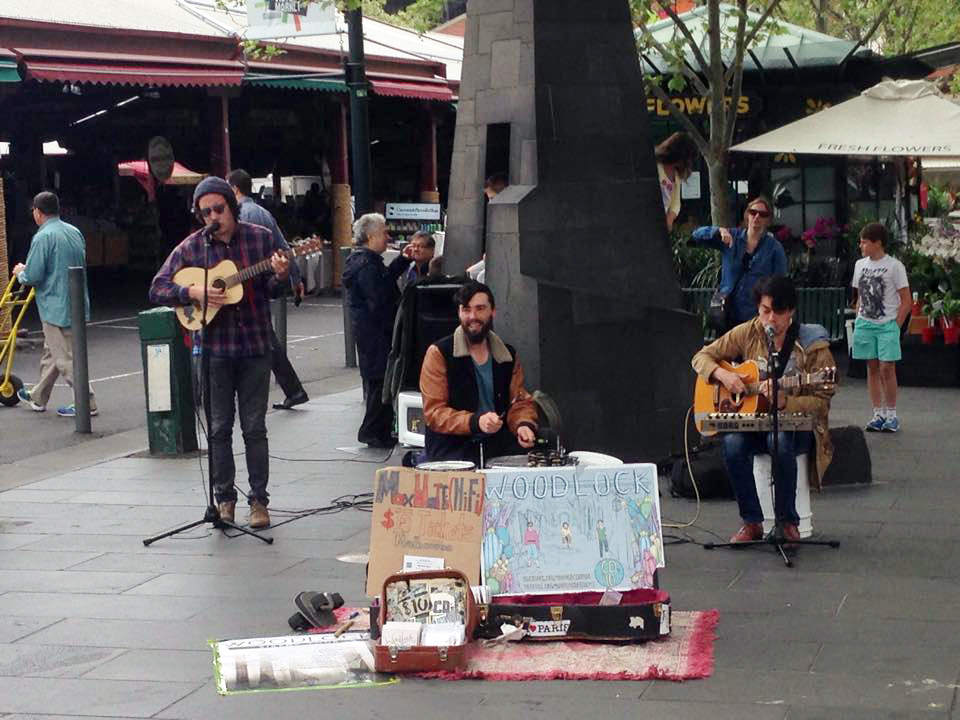
The corner of Therry and Queen streets is a popular location for buskers.

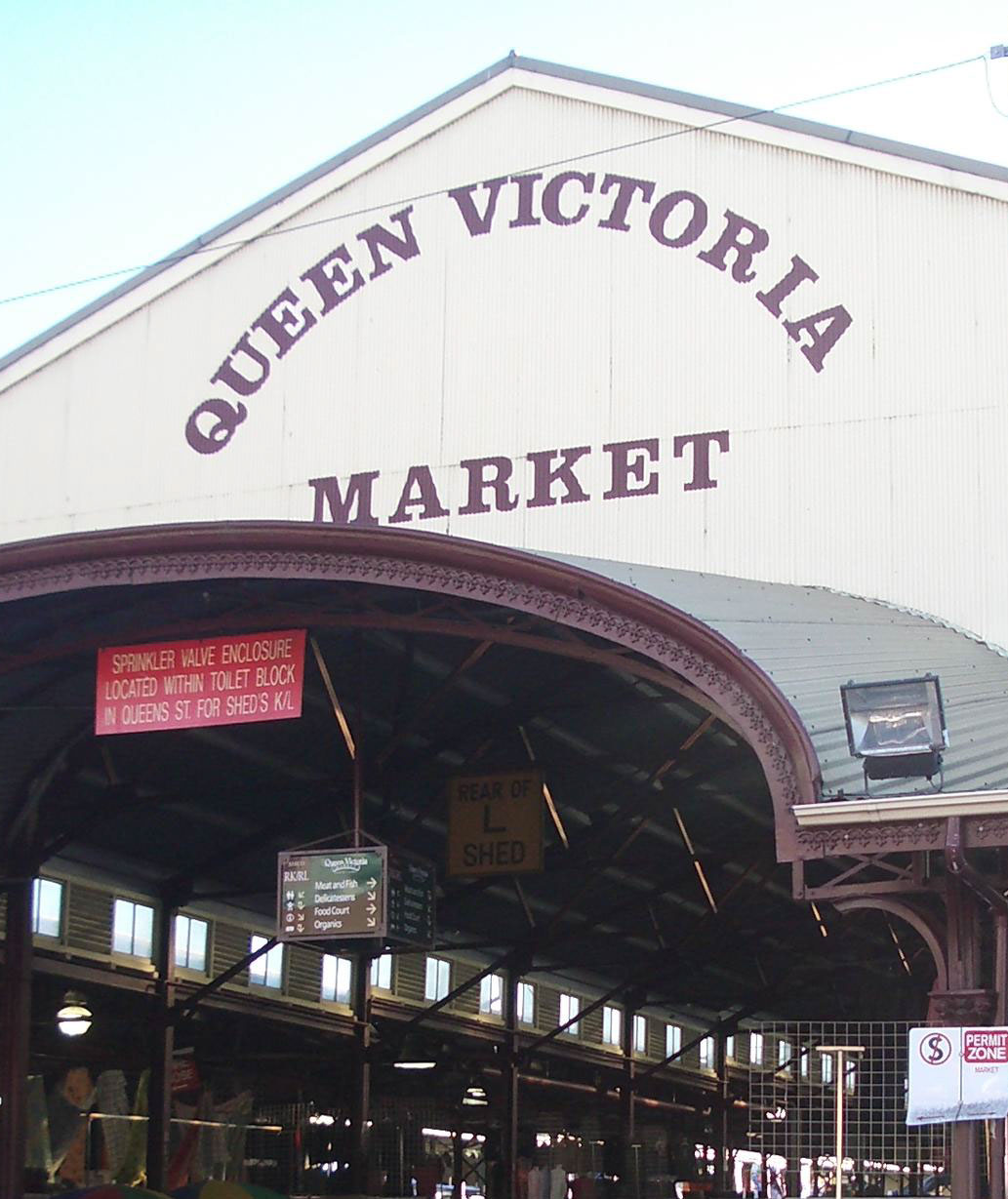
One of the many open-air sheds that comprise the market's central hub

The Queen Victoria Market survives today as the largest and most intact of Melbourne's great nineteenth century markets. It is a major tourist destination in Melbourne, adding to its social and cultural significance. It is open every day of the week except Mondays and Wednesdays. On Wednesday evenings in the summer and winter months, a night market is held which offers dining, bars, live entertainment and a variety of other stalls. It offers a variety of fruit and vegetables, meat, poultry and seafood, gourmet and delicatessen foods as well as specialty delicacies. It also has a large non-food related market, selling a diverse range of clothing, shoes, jewellery and handmade arts and crafts.

Minor upgrades and re-development activities have continued from the late twentieth-century through to the present time. In 2003 the market was equipped with solar panels that harness enough energy to power all the market's clients, and provide a surplus. In January 2010, the Herald Sun reported that city planners wanted to transform the market into a "gourmet hub" by introducing upmarket food stalls. Lord Mayor Robert Doyle said he brought up the idea after visiting London's Borough Market, which has a "boutique" feel that could work in Melbourne. In May 2015 the City of Melbourne draft 2015–16 budget allocated $80.64 million for investment in the Queen Victoria Market. Doyle and Environment Minister Greg Hunt announced the beginning of the process to nominate the market as a UNESCO World Heritage Site.

== Architecture ==
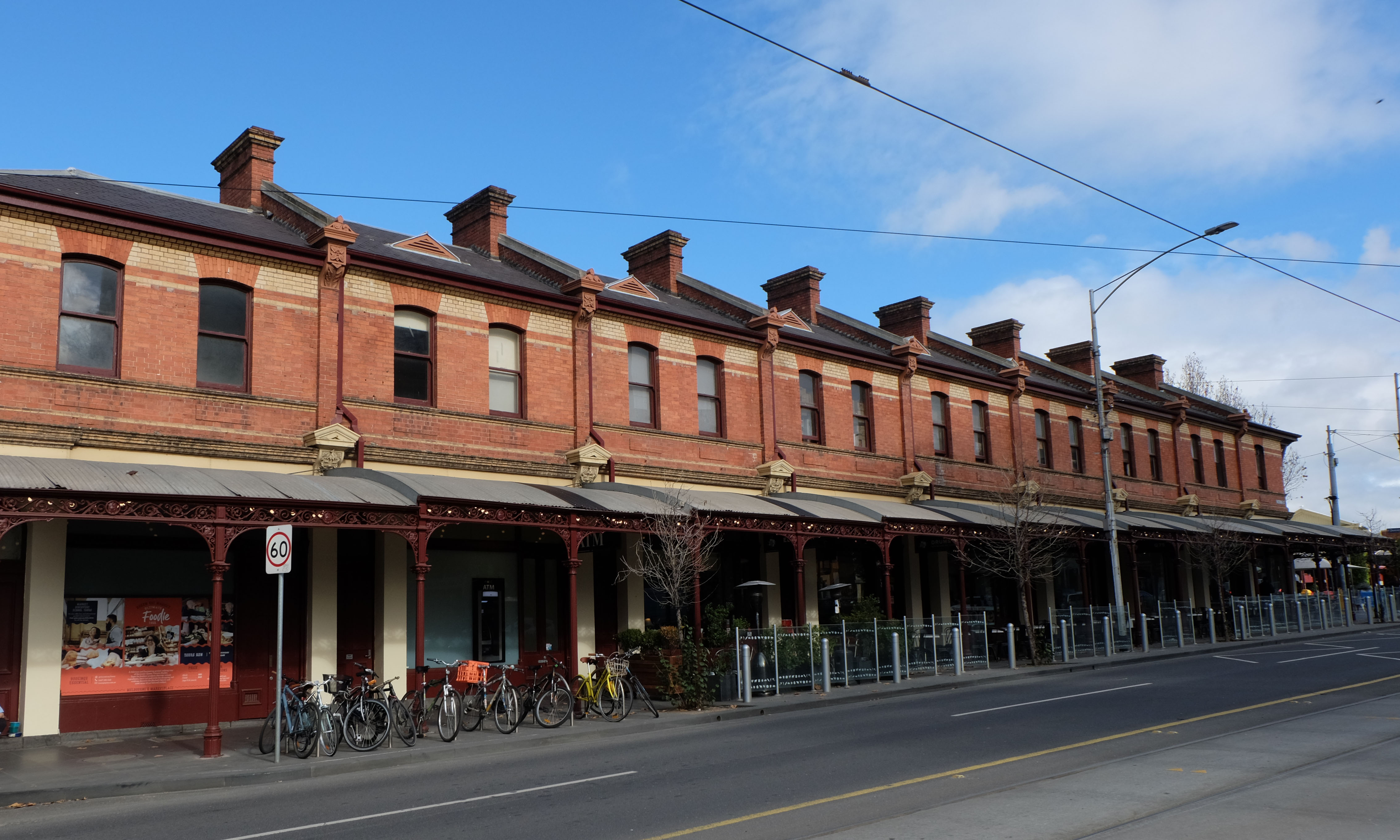
Shopfronts along Victoria Street

Many of the original structures remain intact, presenting visitors with nineteenth century streetscapes and a working market place. The Meat Hall, constructed in 1869, remains largely intact and is the oldest of the original buildings. The Elizabeth Street facade is predominantly intact in relation to its 1884 construction, while the arched north-west and south-east elevations are substantially intact in relation to their 1869 construction. The retail rows in Elizabeth and Victoria Streets, constructed between 1882 and 1891, are important and architecturally significant buildings, affording visitors the opportunity to shop in an extensive and intact 19th century streetscape.

== See also ==
- Dandenong Market
- Metropolitan Meat Market – a Victorian era market in North Melbourne, since converted into an arts precinct
- Prahran Market
- South Melbourne Market
- List of heritage-listed buildings in Melbourne
