= Dandenong =

- Suburb
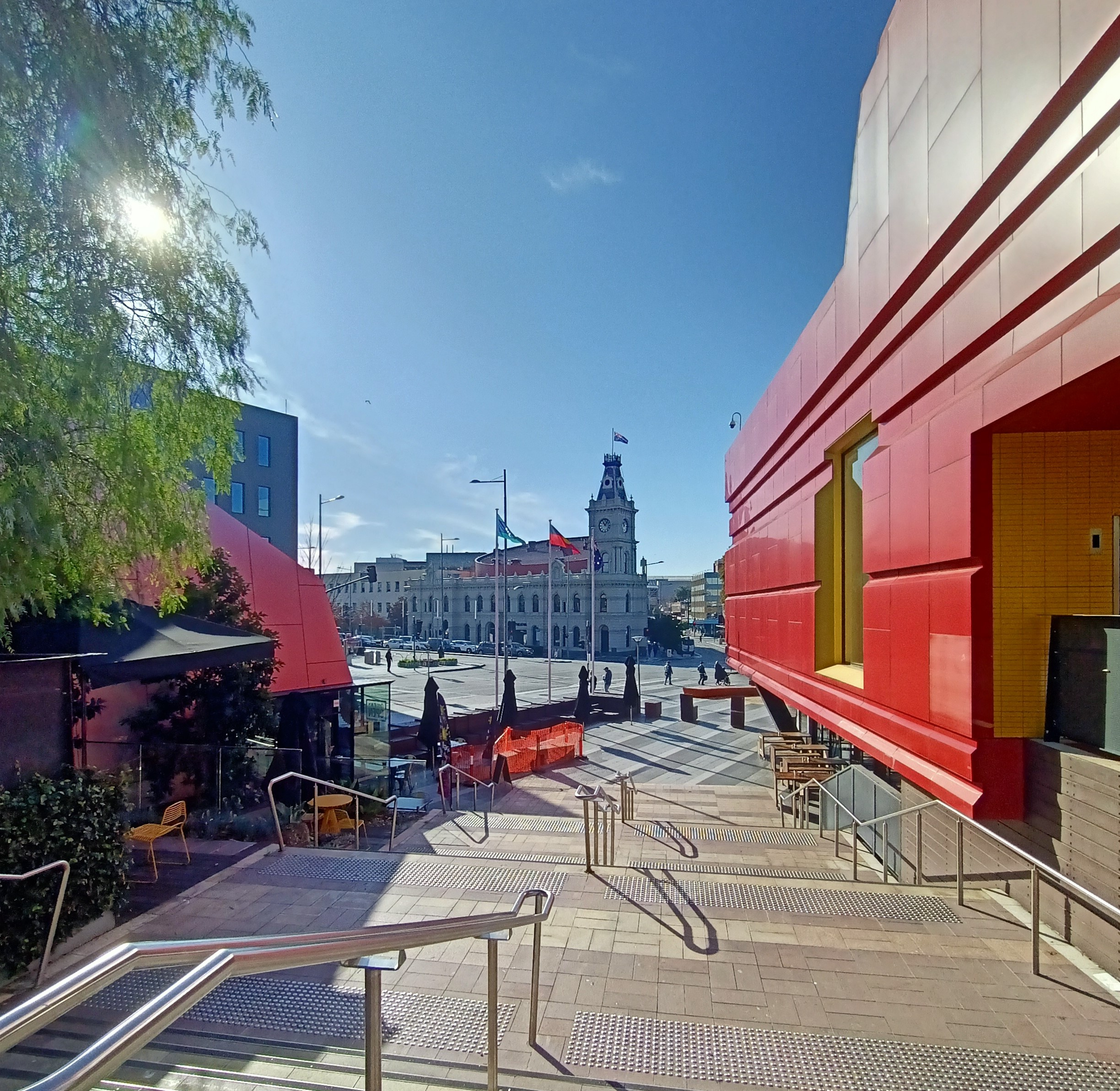
- View from Harmony square of the historical Dandenong Town Hall built in 1890, converted to the Drum Theatre in 2006. Overlooking the intersection of Lonsdale and Walker Streets.

- Interactive map of Dandenong
- Coordinates: 37.981°S 145.215°E
- Country: Australia
- State: Victoria
- City: Melbourne
- LGA: City of Greater Dandenong
- Location: 29 km (18 mi) from Melbourne
- Established: 1837

Government
  - State electorate: Dandenong
  - Federal divisions: Bruce; Isaacs

Area
  - Total: 8.9 km^{2} (3.4 sq mi)
- Elevation: 30 m (98 ft)

Population
  - Total: 30,127 (2021 census)
  - Density: 3,385/km^{2} (8,770/sq mi)
- Postcode: 3175
Suburbs around Dandenong
Noble Park North	Dandenong North	Endeavour Hills
Noble Park	Dandenong	Doveton
Keysborough	Dandenong South	Dandenong South

Dandenong (/ˈdændɪnɒŋ/ DAN-dih-nong) is a major suburb and Metropolitan Activity Centre in south-east Melbourne, Victoria, Australia, about 29 km (18 mi) from the Melbourne CBD. It is the administrative centre of the City of Greater Dandenong and one of the largest commercial, employment, and transport hubs in metropolitan Melbourne. Positioned at the junction of major road, rail and freight networks, Dandenong serves as the principal centre of Melbourne's south-east and a gateway between metropolitan Melbourne and Gippsland.

Originally established as a township in 1852, Dandenong developed into one of Victoria's major manufacturing and industrial centres during the twentieth century. Today, its economy is characterised by manufacturing, logistics, transport, retail, government services, healthcare and education. The suburb is part of one of Australia's largest industrial and employment precincts, anchored by neighboring Dandenong South.

The suburb is the focus of the Revitalising Central Dandenong urban renewal program, a long-term initiative aimed at strengthening the role of Central Dandenong as the civic, commercial and cultural heart of Melbourne's growing south-east. The renewal program has delivered major investment in public spaces, transport infrastructure, housing and commercial development.

Dandenong is one of Melbourne's most culturally diverse communities and is home to significant civic, cultural and transport infrastructure including Harmony Square, the heritage-listed Dandenong Town Hall, the Drum Theatre, Dandenong Market, and Dandenong Railway Station, which acts as a major interchange for metropolitan and regional rail services.

== History ==
=== Aboriginal history ===
The area now occupied by Dandenong lies on the traditional lands of the Wurundjeri and Boonwurrung (Bunurong) peoples of the Kulin Nation. Aboriginal occupation of the region extends back tens of thousands of years, with settlement patterns strongly influenced by the wetlands, floodplains and waterways associated with Dandenong Creek, the former Carrum Swamp and the wider creek system. Cultural and ceremonial life was closely linked to seasonal movements and the availability of natural resources.

The creek flats and surrounding landscape supported significant populations of wildlife, including eels and waterbirds, which provided an important food source. The Dandenong area also contained important meeting and ceremonial sites, many of which continue to hold significance for Aboriginal communities today. Evidence of Aboriginal occupation survives through heritage sites, including scarred trees used for harvesting bark and accessing food sources.

European settlement had profound impact on local Aboriginal communities. Between 1834 and 1850, the Aboriginal population of the Port Phillip region declined dramatically due to disease, dispossession and disruption to traditional land use and cultural practices.

=== Early European settlement ===
The Dandenong area was initially characterised by river red gum forests, creek floodplains and heathland. The fertile soils and access to water attracted European settlers, and by 1837 the district had been established as a pastoral run. Early industries included timber milling, charcoal burning, tanning, quarrying and brickmaking.

The area was prone to flooding due to the presence of the Dandenong Creek, Eumemmering Creek, the former Carrum Swamp and the Koo-Wee-Rup Swamp. Flooding regularly affected the township throughout its early history.

An Aboriginal station and the first Native Police Corps were established in the district during the mid-nineteenth century at what later became known as the Dandenong Police Paddocks Reserve, added to the Victorian Heritage Register.

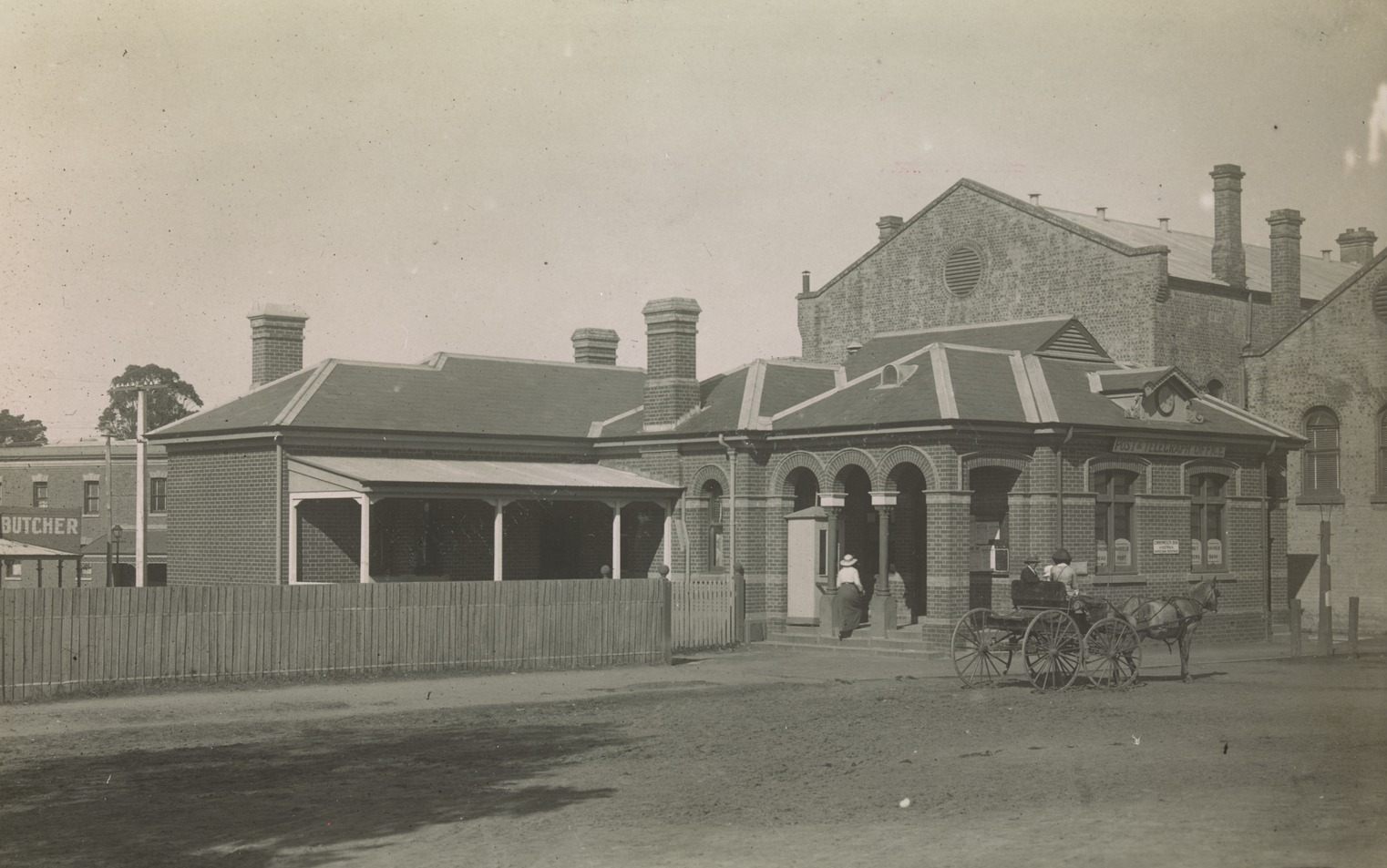
A view of the Dandenong Post Office at the start of the 20th century (now demolished). The back of the town hall on the right.

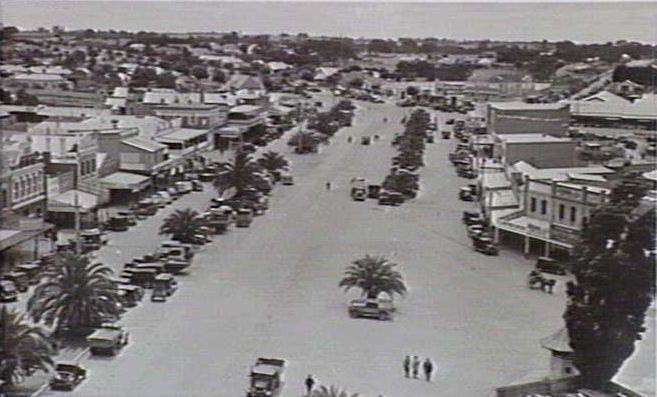
Lonsdale Street from Dandenong Town Hall tower in 1938

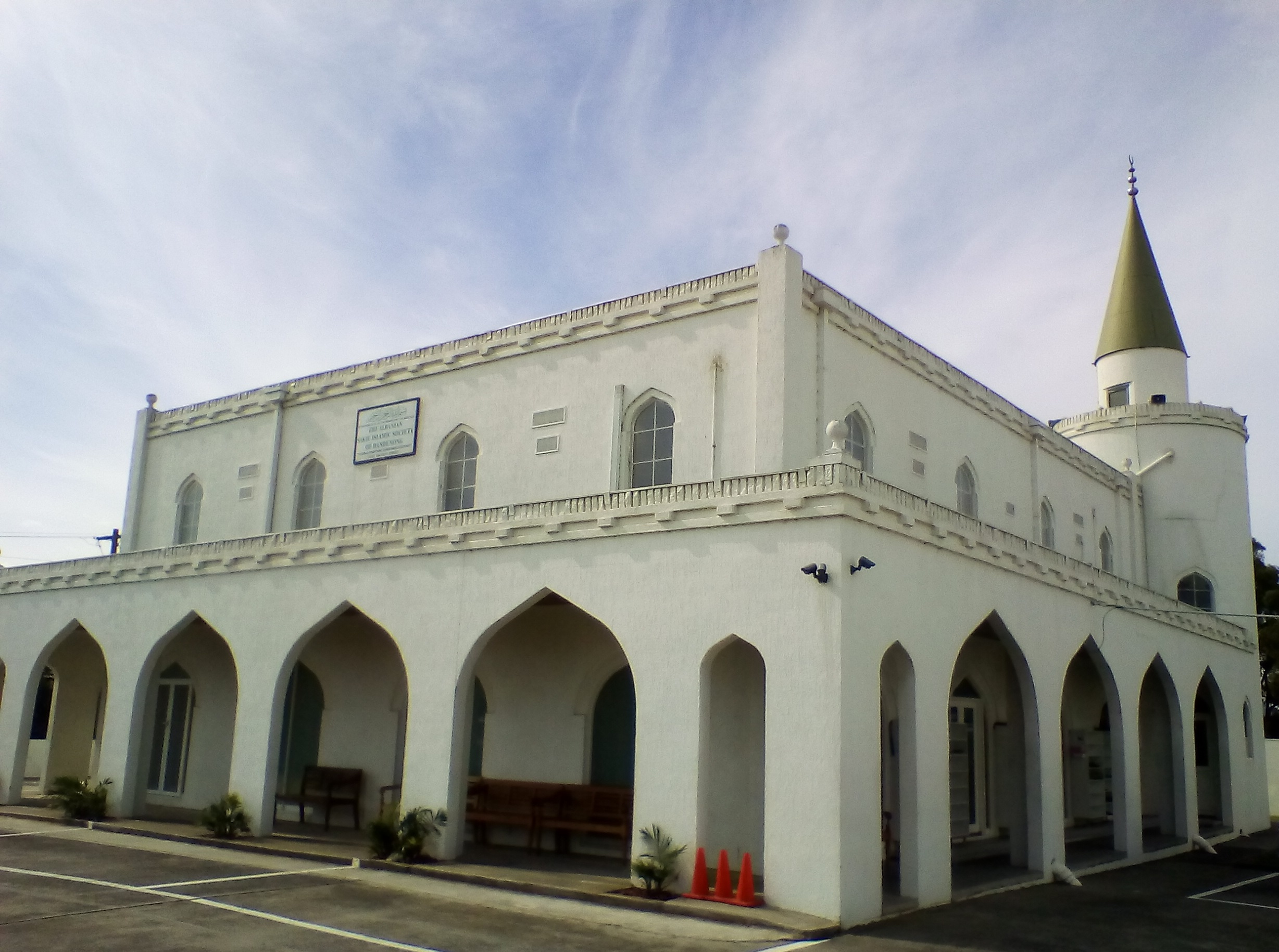
Dandenong's first mosque, built by the Albanian community

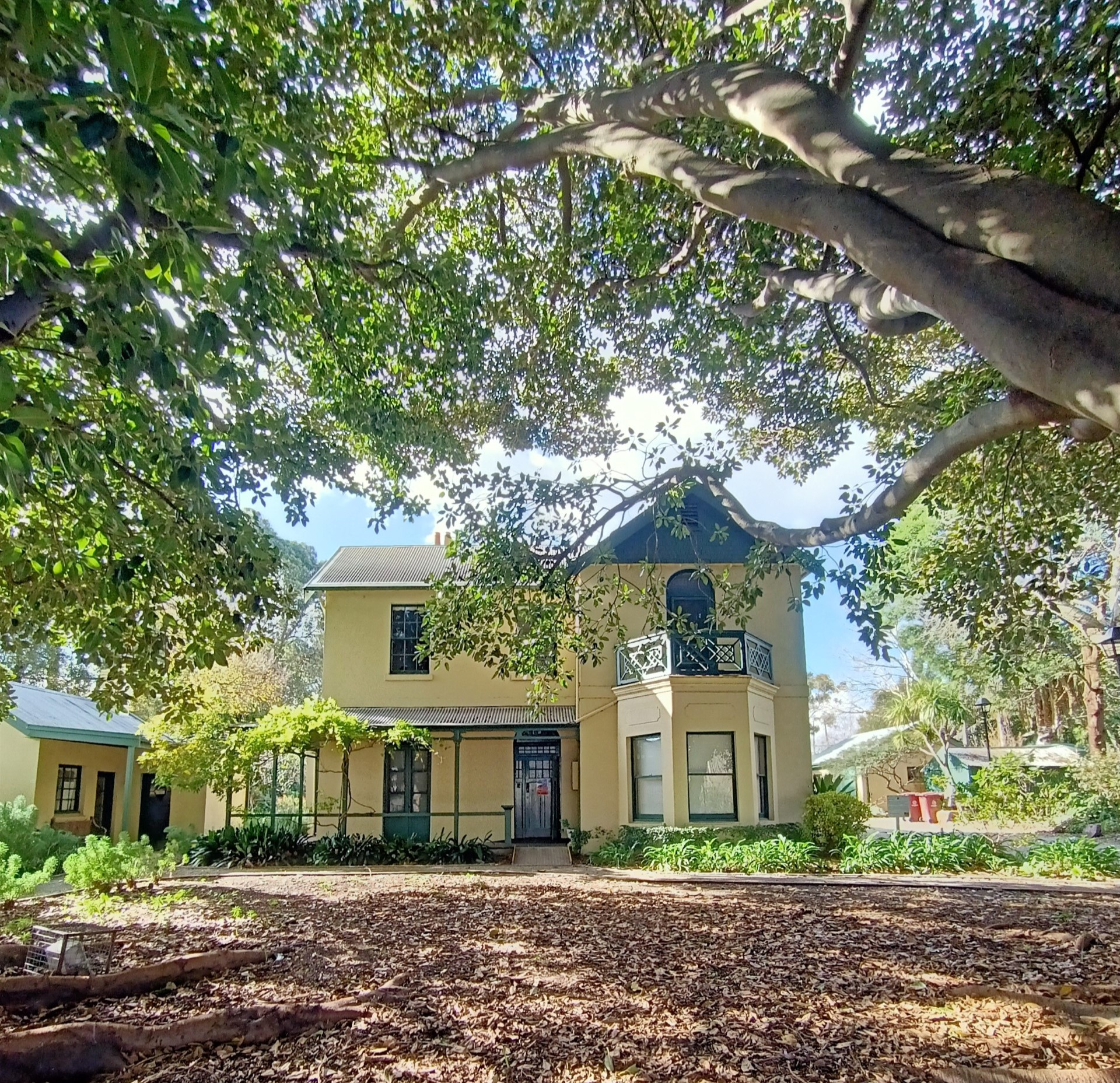
Laurel Lodge (1869), Dandenong

=== Market town and regional centre ===
Following the survey of Dandenong Road in 1852, the township developed as an important transport and trading centre. Growth was closely linked to the establishment of stock and produce markets in 1866, which connected farmers and graziers from across Gippsland and south-eastern Victoria with Melbourne markets.

The markets rapidly expanded and became the primary economic driver of the township. Livestock, produce and household goods were traded weekly, and market days attracted visitors from throughout the region. Dandenong became widely known s the "Gateway to Gippsland" and developed into one of Victoria's leading regional centres.

Key civic institutions emerged during this period, including the Mechanics' Institute, the Dandenong State School and numerous churches serving a growing population. Dandenong Railway Station opened in 1877 on the Melbourne to Sale railway line, further strengthening the town's role as a regional transport centre.

The Dandenong Town Hall, designed by Beswick and Hutchins, opened in 1890 and has remained one of Dandenong's most recognisable landmarks. The building services civic, cultural and judicial functions and became the focal point of community life.

=== Industrialisation and Post-war growth ===
Industrial development accelerated during the twentieth century. The Gippsland Co-operative Bacon Curing Company, established in 1911 and later known for the iconic "Dandy Pig" sign, became one of the city's largest employers and major contributors to economic growth.

Following the Second World War, Dandenong experienced rapid industrialisation and population growth. Large numbers of migrants, particularly from Italy and Greece, settled in the area. Major manufacturers including General Motors Holden, International Harvester and Heinz established factories in Dandenong, helping transform the city into one of Victoria's principal manufacturing centres.

Retail activity also expanded significantly. During the 1950s and 1960s, Lonsdale Street became known as the "Golden Mile", reflecting strong commercial growth. Major retailers including Coles, Woolworths and later Myer established large stores in the city centre.

Dandenong was proclaimed a city in 1959, reflecting its growing regional importance and population.

=== Multiculturalism and metropolitan development ===
Dandenong Civic Centre, completed in 2014, houses the new council chambers and the Dandenong Library

During the late twentieth century, Dandenong became one of Australia's most culturally diverse communities. New migrant communities established businesses and cultural institutions throughout the city centre, contributing to the emergence of the Little India precinct in Foster Street and the Afghan Bazaar in Thomas Street.

By the 1990s and early 2000s, retail competition from suburban shopping centres and changing economic conditions contributed to declining investment in parts of the city centre. In response, the Victorian Government launched the Revitalising Central Dandenong initiative in 2005-06. The program committed approximately $290 million in public investment with the objective of attracting new employment, housing and private-sector investment to central Dandenong.

Major projects delivered under the initiative included the redevelopment of Lonsdale Street, the restoration and expansion of the Drum Theatre, the creation of Harmony Square, new municipal offices, a civic precinct, government services facilities and the redevelopment of Dandenong Market. The program reinforced Dandenong's role as a major metropolitan activity centre within Melbourne's south-east.

== Demographics ==
At the time of the 2021 Census, the most common ancestries were Afghan 17.1%, English 9.7%, Australian 9.1% and Indian 7.9%. The most common countries of birth being Australian 30.9%, Afghanistan 11.5%, India 9.5%, Sri Lanka 5.4%, Pakistan 4% and Macedonia 2.7%. The most common languages spoken at home were English 23.5%, Persian 14.5%, Albanian 5%, Punjabi 4.4% and Tamil 3.5%. Islam is the most common religion with 34.1%, followed by Catholicism 12.3%, Hinduism 7.4% and 13.7% recording no religious affiliation.

== Transport ==
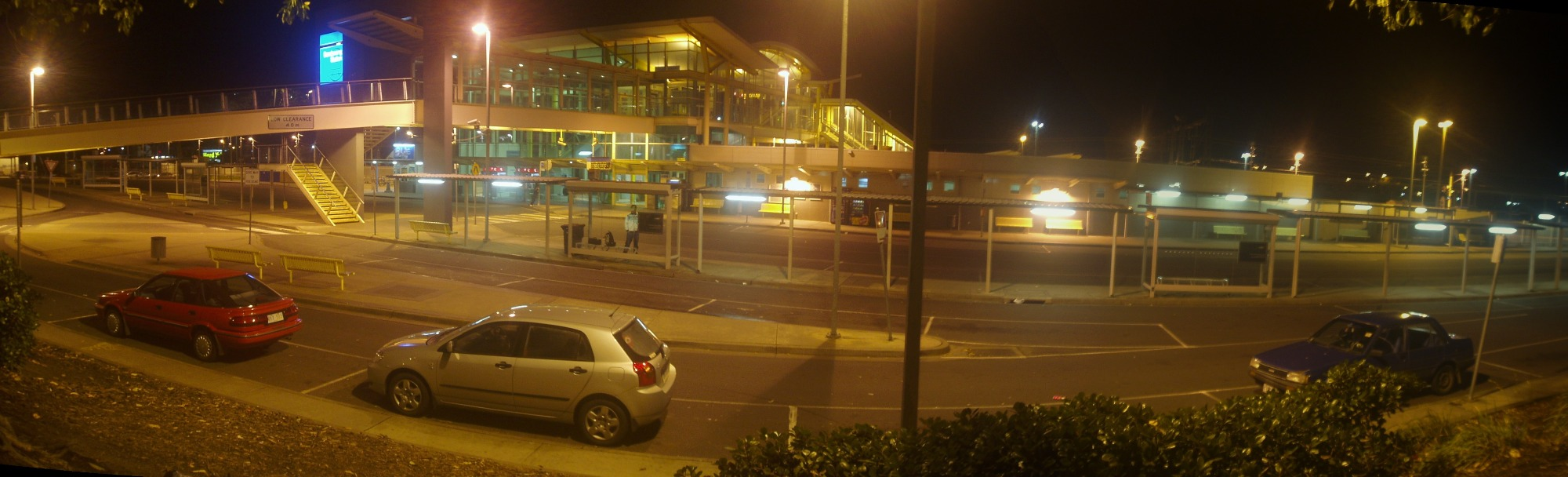
A panorama of the Dandenong railway station

Dandenong is primarily a private transport-dependent community due to the relatively poorer public transit compared to other suburbs closer to the CBD. It is served by the Monash Freeway (M1) which passes near its northeast, as well as several other major arterial roads such as the Princes Highway (National Route 1), Stud Road/Dandenong-Frankston Road (State Route 9), Cheltenham Road (Route 10), Heatherton Road (Route 14) and Dandenong Bypass (Route 49). The EastLink (M3) also passes near the western edge of the suburb, and the South Gippsland Highway (Route 12) branches off the Princes Highway at the southeastern corner of the suburb.

The Dandenong railway station is situated at the southern edge of the suburb CBD and is an interchange station for the Pakenham and Cranbourne lines, as well as V/Line regional trains on the Gippsland railway line. It is approximately 50 minutes from Flinders Street station in Melbourne CBD by stopping-all-station train, but shorter if via limited express services. The Victorian state government has proposed triplication of the railway line to support a higher volume of trains for the growing population in and around Dandenong as well as other suburbs and towns along the line.

In a council planning policy document, light rail is suggested as a future transport mode for the central Dandenong area.

== Sport ==
The suburb has several Australian rules football clubs including the Dandenong West Football Club, competing in the Southern Football Netball League at the Dandenong Showgrounds. Other teams in the Dandenong area include the Dandenong Stingrays (Talent League) at Shepley Oval, St John's Old Collegians (VAFA) at Carroll Reserve, and the Dandenong Saints (DDJFL – juniors) at Carroll Reserve. Numerous clubs have folded in recent years.

Dandenong hosts numerous football (soccer) clubs. Dandenong Thunder plays in the Victorian Premier League which is the second tier behind the A-League and enjoys much support from the local community. The side plays their home fixtures at George Andrews Reserve and has been both premiers and champions of Victoria multiple times. The other teams are Dandenong City SC, White Star Dandenong FC and Dandenong Wolves Football Club. Dandenong-based teams have hosted many international players in its time, including Ljubo Miličević, Eugene Galeković, Ante Milicic, Cengiz Benlisoy, Semih Yildiz, Cenk Ali and Ilker Berberoglu.

Dandenong also has numerous cricket clubs in the area. Dandenong Cricket Club plays in the Victorian Premier League and has produced a number of state players to date. The most important of these have been Peter Siddle (Australia), Darren Pattinson (England) and Cameron White (Australia) who have all gone on to play test cricket. Other prominent players from the club include Ian Harvey, James Pattinson, Brett Forsyth, Ercan Ileri, Jackson Coleman and Kumar Sana. The area also consists of a women's team, the Dandenong Women's Cricket Club who compete in the Victorian Women's Cricket Association. Several other clubs in the area play in the Dandenong and District Cricket Association (DDCA). These include Buckley Ridges, Dandenong North, Dandenong West, and the St Mary's Cricket Clubs. Other clubs within the City of Greater Dandenong include Coomoora, Keysborough, Lyndale, Parkfield, Silverton, Southern Pirates, Springvale and Springvale South Cricket Clubs. Noble Park Cricket Club is also located within the City of Greater Dandenong, and plays in the Victorian Sub-District Cricket Association.

The South Eastern Titans Rugby League club fields both junior & senior teams in the NRL Victoria competition. Their home ground is located at Greaves Reserve.

Golfers play at the course of the Forest Hills Golf Club on Wedge Street, Dandenong.

== Climate ==
Climate data for Dandenong
Month	Jan	Feb	Mar	Apr	May	Jun	Jul	Aug	Sep	Oct	Nov	Dec	Year
Record high °C (°F)	42.2 (108.0)	42.2 (108.0)	38.4 (101.1)	32.2 (90.0)	26.7 (80.1)	19.5 (67.1)	18.3 (64.9)	22.8 (73.0)	26.8 (80.2)	32.4 (90.3)	32.3 (90.1)	37.0 (98.6)	42.2 (108.0)
Mean daily maximum °C (°F)	26.6 (79.9)	26.2 (79.2)	24.3 (75.7)	20.5 (68.9)	16.2 (61.2)	14.0 (57.2)	13.3 (55.9)	14.3 (57.7)	16.3 (61.3)	19.3 (66.7)	20.8 (69.4)	23.5 (74.3)	19.6 (67.3)
Mean daily minimum °C (°F)	12.8 (55.0)	13.4 (56.1)	11.7 (53.1)	9.9 (49.8)	7.6 (45.7)	5.6 (42.1)	5.3 (41.5)	6.1 (43.0)	7.2 (45.0)	8.5 (47.3)	9.5 (49.1)	11.0 (51.8)	9.0 (48.2)
Record low °C (°F)	4.8 (40.6)	5.8 (42.4)	2.8 (37.0)	−1.1 (30.0)	−0.3 (31.5)	−3.9 (25.0)	−2.2 (28.0)	−1.7 (28.9)	−0.6 (30.9)	−2.6 (27.3)	−0.6 (30.9)	2.8 (37.0)	−3.9 (25.0)
Average rainfall mm (inches)	52.7 (2.07)	49.7 (1.96)	49.0 (1.93)	68.6 (2.70)	71.6 (2.82)	66.6 (2.62)	68.1 (2.68)	71.8 (2.83)	70.0 (2.76)	74.1 (2.92)	74.2 (2.92)	65.5 (2.58)	781.9 (30.79)
Average rainy days (≥ 0)	8.2	7	9.2	11.4	14.6	15.5	17.1	16.4	15.1	13.3	11.6	9.9	149.3
Source: Bureau of Meteorology (rainfall 1960-2025, temperatures 1962-1974)

== Notable residents ==
- Oscar Asche (1871-1936), Australian actor, director and writer
- Andrew Bogut (1984–), former NBA for Golden State Warriors
- Adam Collins (1984–), sports journalist and broadcaster
- Bert Cremean (1900–45), politician, held district of Dandenong 1929–32
- Vince Grella (1979–), former soccer player for Socceroos and Blackburn Rovers
- Ann Halpin (1939-2009), Presentation sister, a 'City of Greater Dandenong Living Treasure' and Greater Dandenong's Citizen of the Year in 2009
- Joseph Hawdon (1813-1871), pioneer settler of Dandenong (1837)
- Ajdin Hrustic (1996–), footballer for Eintracht Frankfurt
- Scott McDonald (1983–), former footballer for the Socceroos, Motherwell F.C. and Western Sydney Wanderers FC
- Winnie Quagliotti (1931–1988), Wurundjeri community leader
- Adam Treloar (1993–), former Australian rules player

== Sister cities ==
Dandenong is twinned with:

- Aalborg, Denmark
- Xuzhou, China

== See also ==
- City of Dandenong – Dandenong was previously within this former local government area.
- Electoral district of Dandenong
