= South Melbourne Market =

Market in Victoria, Australia

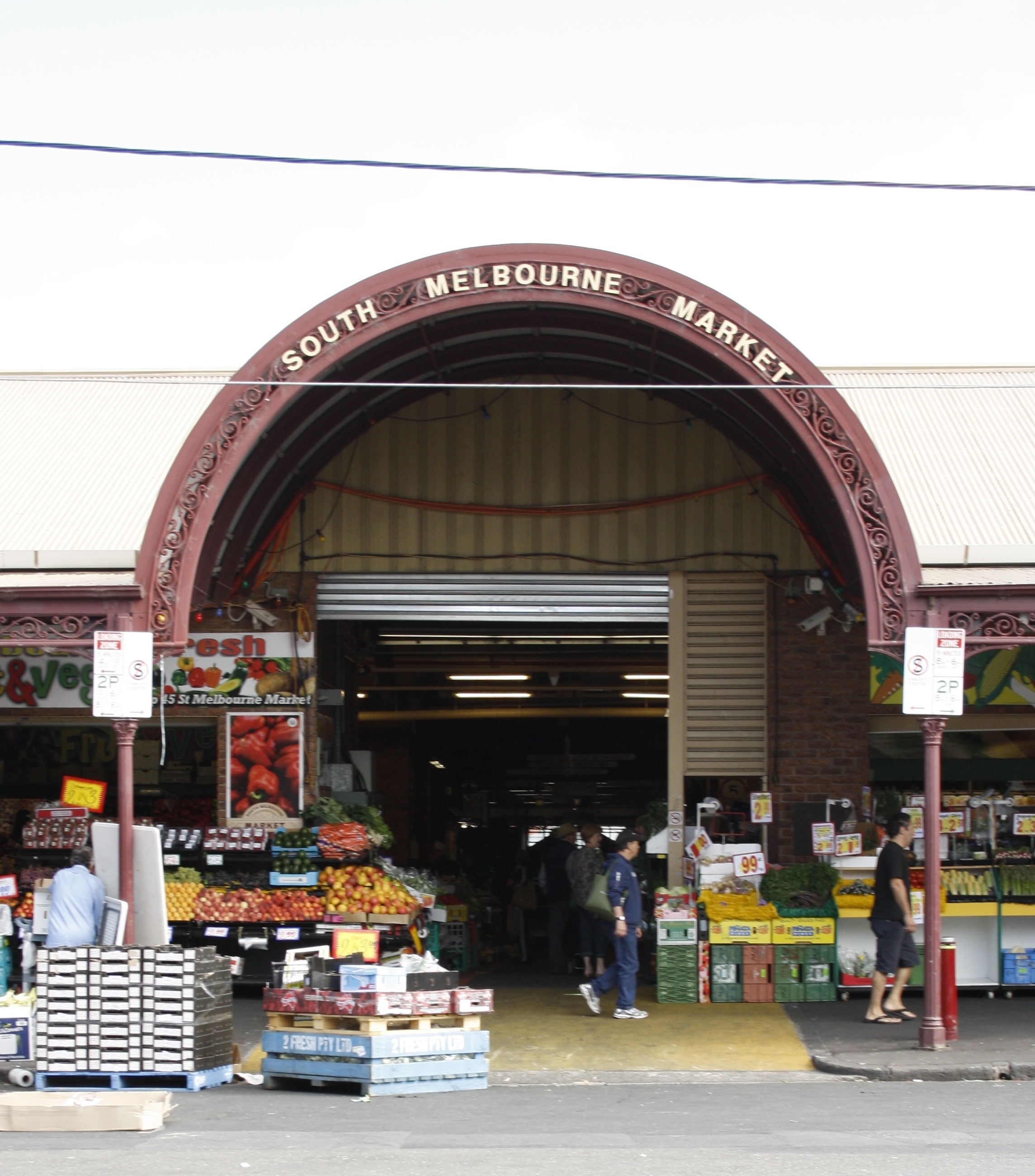
- Photograph of a side entrance to the South Melbourne Market.

General information
- Status: Open
- Type: Public food and produce market
- Location: South Melbourne, Victoria, Australia
- Coordinates: 37.8321°S 144.9565°E
- Completed: 1867
- Owner: City of Port Phillip

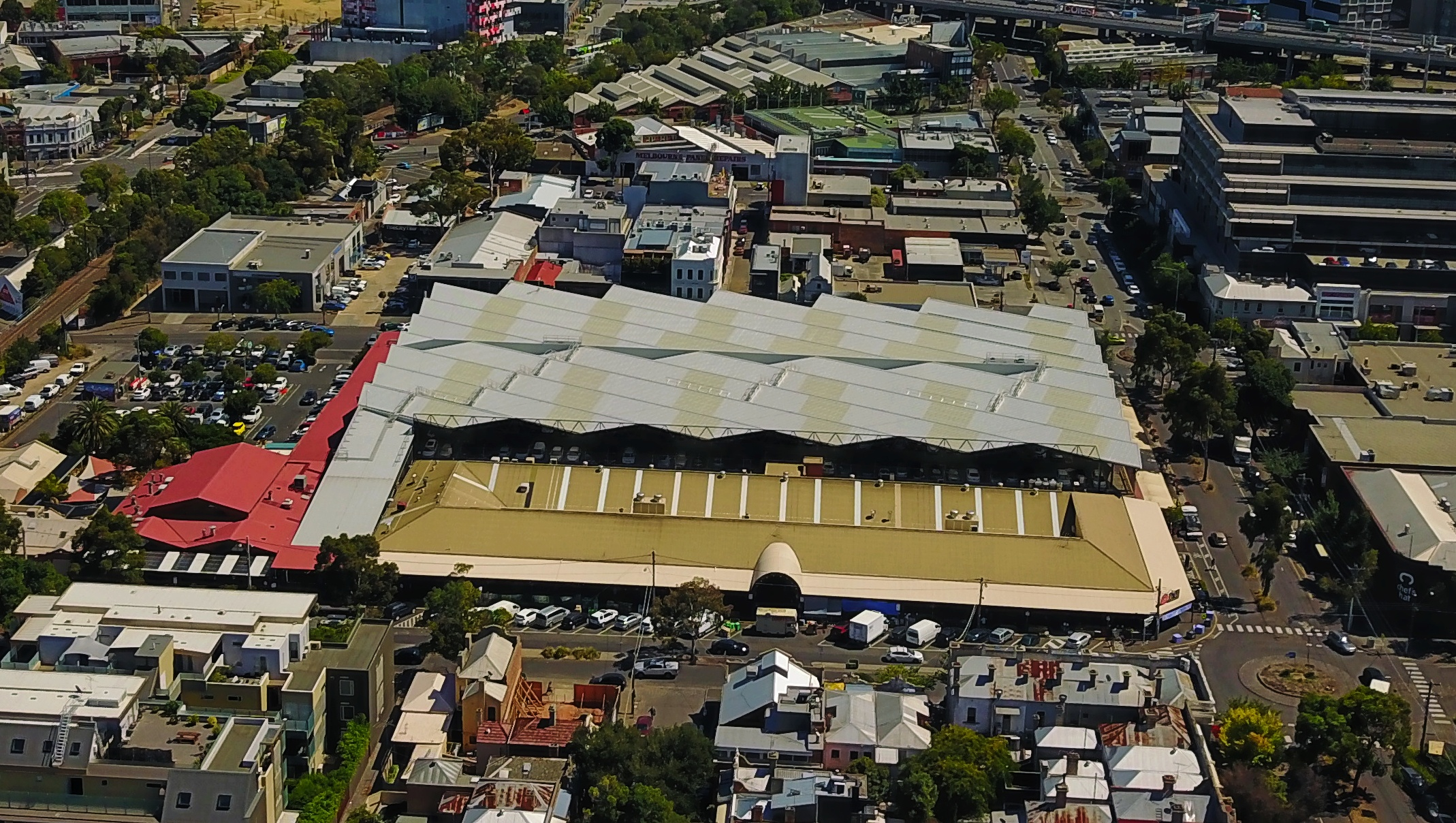
South Melbourne market, Aerial view, 2019.

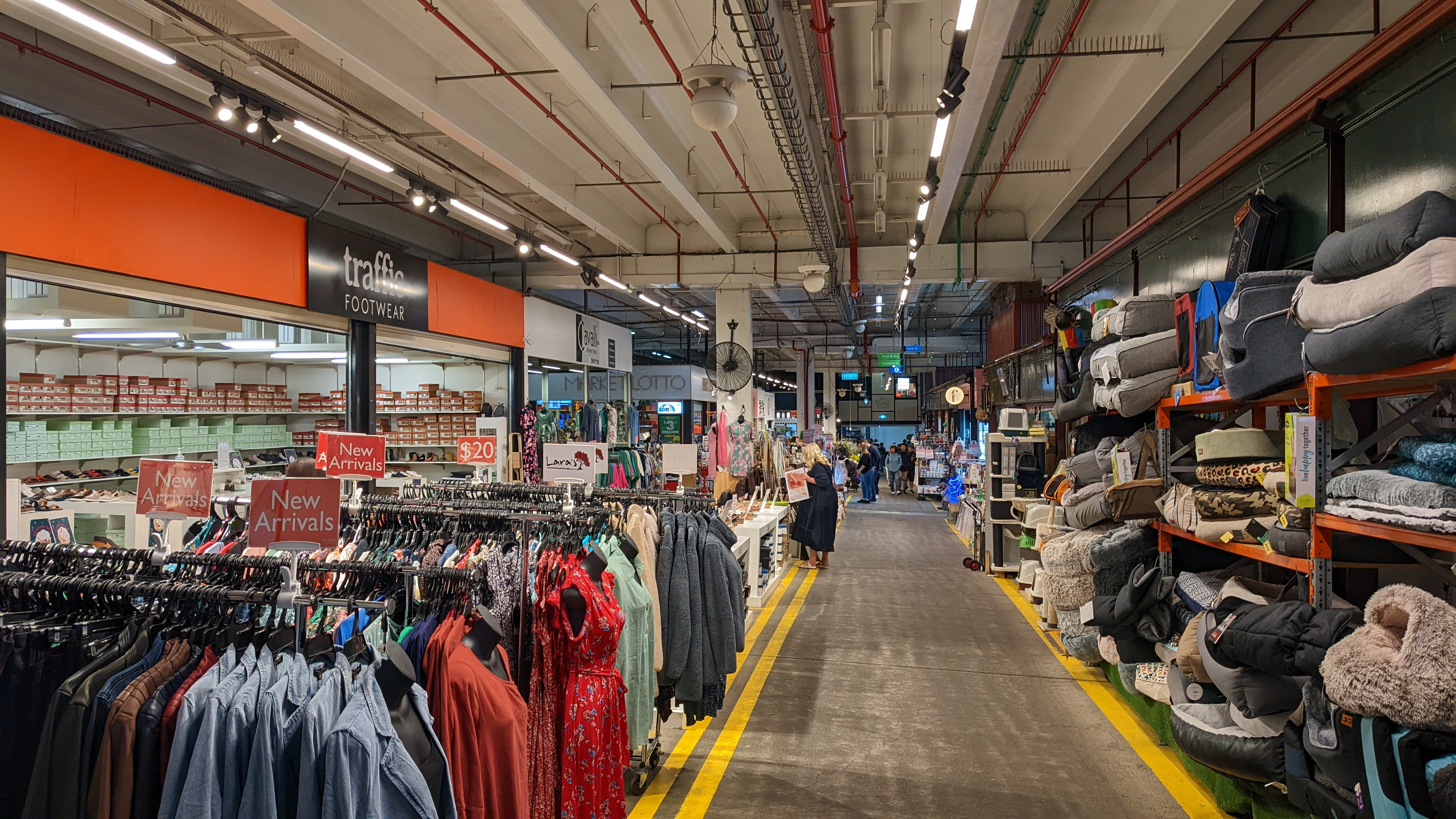
Shops in the clothing area of the Market.

The South Melbourne Market is a covered food and general goods market located in South Melbourne, Victoria. Opened in 1867, it is the oldest continuously operating market in Melbourne.

== History ==
It began operating in 1867, as an outlet for vegetables, fruit and flowers grown by the market gardeners of Cheltenham. It is a Victorian style of building with wood and red brick.

The market is known for its dim sims, which were originally made by chef Ken Cheng.

The market has undergone various refurbishments, including after numerous fires. The worst of these was in 1981 when two of the original sheds were destroyed and, later in the year, stalls were damaged by bombs.

In 2007/2008, the market's produce areas were redesigned, and in 2012 a new roof was added to reduce leaking and heat load.

== Access via public transport ==
Tram route 96 stops at the light rail station adjacent to the western end of the market. Tram route 12 runs down the nearby Clarendon St, with stop 127 at the corner of York St. Bus route 236 stops at Cecil St on the eastern end of the market.

== See also ==
- Queen Victoria Market
