= Prahran Market =

Food Market in Australia

Coordinates: 37°50′47″S 144°59′32″E

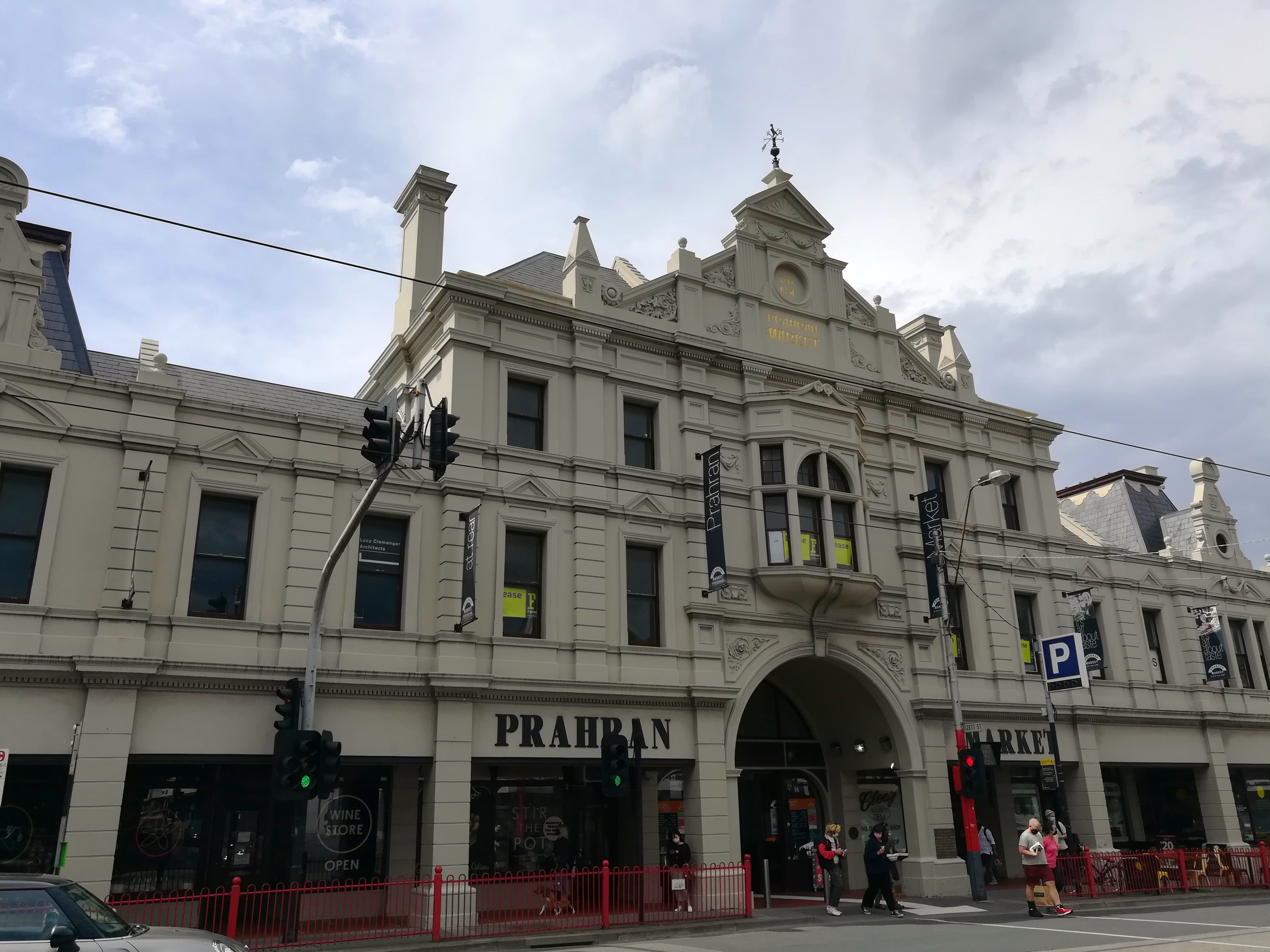
Prahran Market

Prahran Market is a food market in South Yarra, Melbourne, Victoria, Australia. Located on Commercial Road near Chapel Street, it was established in neighbouring Prahran in the 1860s, before moving to its present location in 1881.

The market has a variety of stalls and specialty shops selling fresh fruit and vegetables, meat, fish and deli foods, as well as cafes. The market is open every day except Mondays and Wednesdays, with select traders operating on Sundays.

== History ==
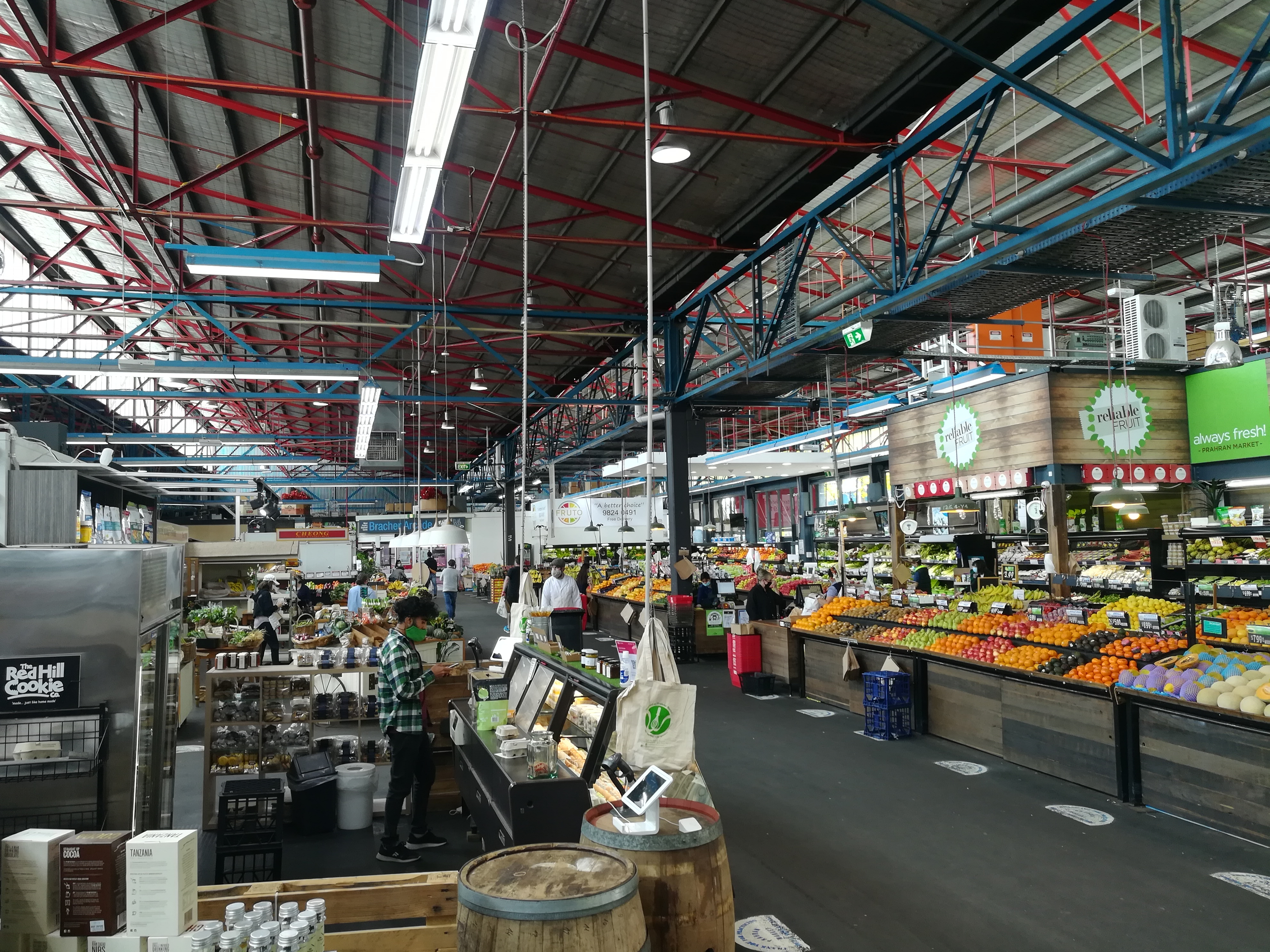
The main market area

The original Prahran (pronounced /pɛ'ræn/) Market had its origins in 1864 when the Prahran Council purchased land near the corner of Greville and Grattan Street, which today is replaced by a garden and fountain. The council determined that, due to the population growth during the 1850s, a central market place was required for many small farmers and market gardeners in the area in order to be able to sell their produce. This first Prahran market was in operation, by June 1867.

By 1881, the site had become overcrowded and the market was moved to its present location on Commercial Road. The erection of market buildings and extension of stalls was carried out in 1890 and the new Prahran Market was opened in 1891. The present façade on Commercial Road, which exhibits mannerist and Anglo-Dutch influences, is much the same as it was in 1891 and includes the complete mansard roof. The market was further extended in 1923 and in the late 1920s, refrigeration became available for perishable goods. The balcony above the Commercial Road shops was the site for Friday night concerts by The Salvation Army.

The market became a distribution point for groceries, clothing and boots for the unemployed during the depression years of the 1930s. During the Second World War, most of the men in the market were conscripted into the armed forces and their wives and children undertook the job of buying, carting and selling produce. The fruit and vegetable section of the Market was destroyed in a fire on Boxing Day 1950, after which a temporary structure was erected. But it was not until 1972, that the Prahran Council sought tenders for the redevelopment of the market site. The final stage of the redevelopment was completed in 1976 at a total cost of A$6.5 million.

In the 1990s, an independent Board was appointed to run the Market, major structural repairs and renovations to the market complex were completed, and a multi-level carpark between Elizabeth and Barry Street was added.

== Transport ==
The Sandringham railway service stops at nearby South Yarra and Prahran railway stations. Tram route 72 runs along Commercial Road and stops right outside the market. Tram route 78 operates along Chapel Street and Kinetic Melbourne bus routes 216, 219, and 220 operate along Commercial Road.
