= Nauru House =

Landmark 52-storey building located in the Melbourne CBD, Victoria, Australia

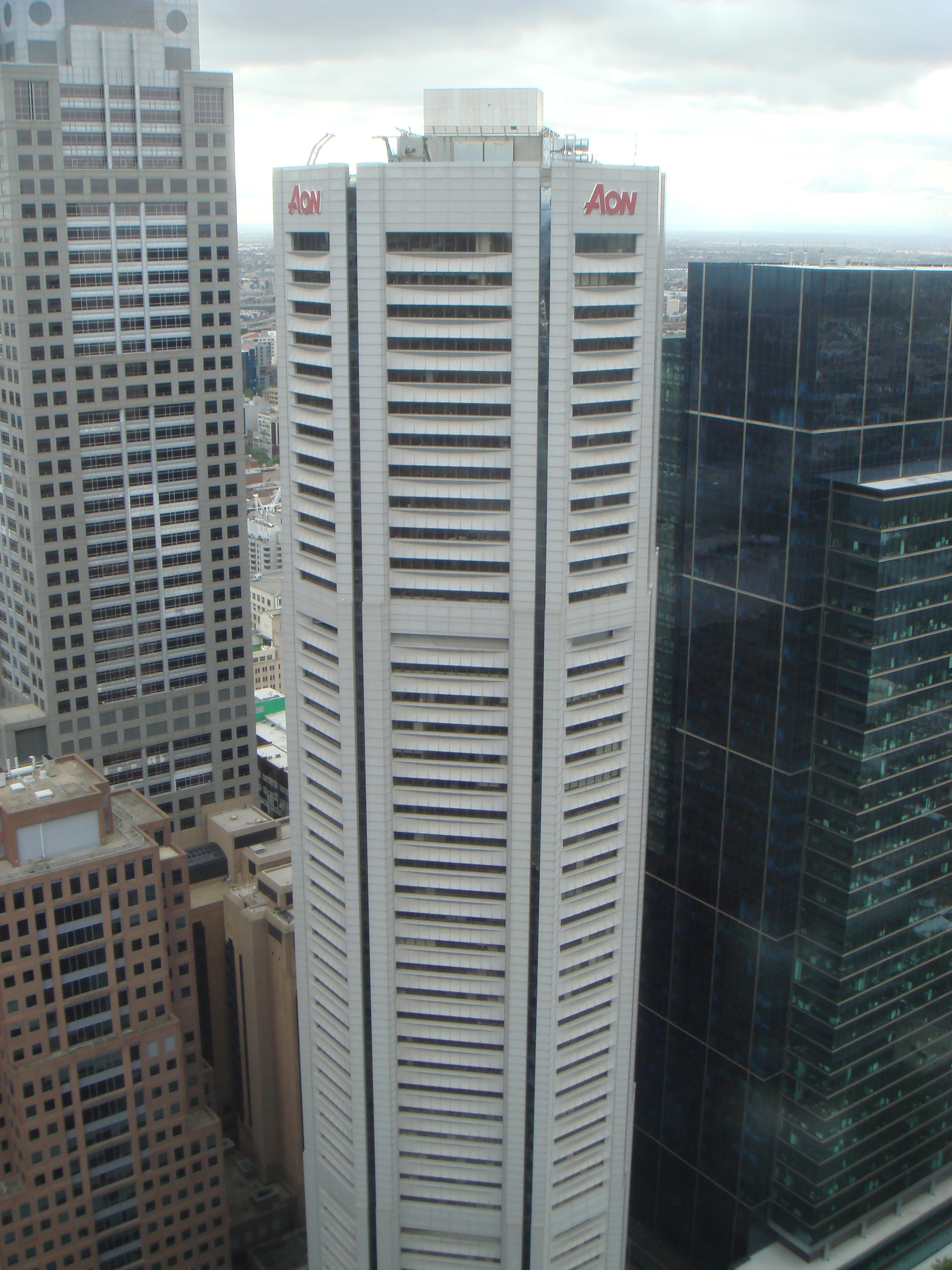

Record height
- Tallest in Melbourne from 1977 to 1978^{[I]}
- Preceded by: Optus Centre
- Surpassed by: Collins Place

General information
- Type: Office
- Location: Exhibition Street, Melbourne, Australia
- Coordinates: 37°48′48″S 144°58′15″E
- Completed: 1977

Height
- Antenna spire: 190 m (620 ft)
- Roof: 183 m (600 ft)

Technical details
- Floor count: 52
- Floor area: 50,500 m^{2} (544,000 sq ft)

Design and construction
- Architect: Perrott Lyon Timlock & Kesa
- Main contractor: Civil & Civic

Nauru House (also called 80 Collins Street) is a landmark 52-storey building located in the Melbourne central business district, Victoria, Australia. The building was designed by architectural firm Perrott Lyon Timlock & Kesa and completed in 1977.

== History ==
By the early 1970s, the tiny Pacific island nation of the Republic of Nauru had large funds generated by the sale of phosphate. They established the Nauru Phosphate Royalties Trust (NPRT) to invest the profits in international real estate.

The site on the corner of Exhibition and Little Collins streets was purchased by the NPRT in 1972 for A$19 million, for the construction of an investment office tower.

=== Le Louvre ===
The site included a number of older buildings facing Collins Street, and the development was proposed at a time of increasing concern at the loss of the historic buildings of the famed "Paris End" of Collins Street. The long established Ogg's Chemist at 76-78 Collins, the adjacent terrace at 80 Collins, and the three storey Victorian terrace at 84 Collins were demolished by 1972, but attempts to purchase and demolish the exclusive Le Louvre boutique at 72-74 Collins Street (built in 1855) were stymied by the owner Lillian Wightman who refused to sell. The four storey 1960s Palmer House at 82 Collins between the two demolished buildings was also not purchased, leaving a pair of "gaps" in Collins Street, which were paved and landscaped. The space where 78 - 80 Collins had been, flanked by roughly finished side walls of the remaining buildings, gave Nauru House an address of 80 Collins Street.

When completed in 1977 it briefly became the tallest building in Melbourne; however, it was not tall enough to take the mantle as Australia's tallest building, with the strikingly similar, but taller, MLC Centre in Sydney completed just a few months earlier by the same builder. In 1978, Nauru House was surpassed by the ANZ Tower of the Collins Place development as the tallest building in Melbourne. As of November 2026, Nauru House is the 41st-tallest building in Melbourne.

Due to cracks and decay in the pebble finish of the concrete, all the exterior of the tower was encased in matte-gray aluminium in 1991.

In the early 2000s, following decades of mismanagement, over-spending and spiralling loans from General Electric, estimated to amount to approximately A$227 million, the NPRT was forced to sell off its international assets.

=== Redevelopment ===
Nauru House was purchased by the Queensland Investment Corporation (QIC) in December 2004 for A$140 million .

A large scale redevelopment of the site was first planned in 2008, with an office tower taller than Nauru House proposed between it and Collins Street, cantilevering over the remaining historic buildings. Thirty years after the original development, QIC was successful this time in purchasing Le Louvre at 72-74 Collins Street from Lillian's daughter Georgina Weir, and the business moved to South Yarra. QIC also bought and then demolished the 1960s office block at 82 Collins Street, creating the wide frontage to Collins Street that Nauru House had failed to establish. The final design for the redevelopment was for a 35 level office tower with a front portion cantilevering out to a point setback 6m from Collins Street (and with only a 6m gap between it and Nauru House), a new podium with shops and an arcade, an "infill" streetscape of shops on Collins Street, and a 300 room hotel facing Little Collins Street. The design was a collaboration between Jouin Manku, Seventh Wave, UNStudio, and local architects Woods Bagot. Construction commenced in 2017, with completion due in 2020, with the new tower is to be known as 80 Collins South Tower, and Nauru House to be renamed as 80 Collins North Tower.

In early 2019, the under-construction development was purchased by Dexus for a reported $1.4 billion.

In December 2019, following reported structural issues, the Le Louvre building was reduced to a facade.

The development was progressively completed through 2020–21, with a number of high-end hospitality venues and shops occupying the ground level and the lower buildings facing Collins Street.

== See also ==
- Pacific Star Building
- Nauru Phosphate Royalties Trust
