= Flinders Lane =

Street in Melbourne

Flinders Lane Victoria
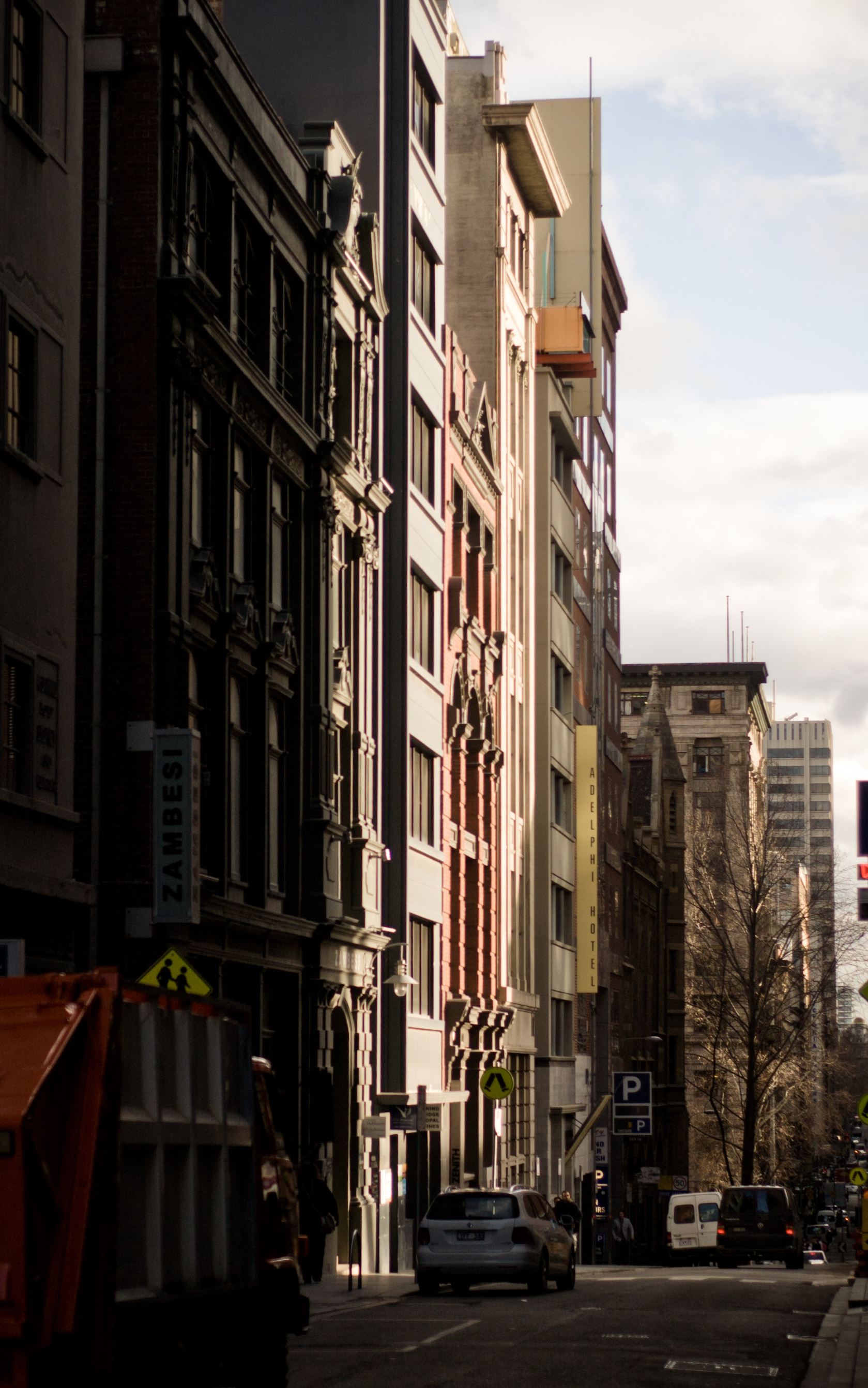
- Flinders Lane
- Coordinates: 37.8170°S 144.9652°E

General information
- Type: Street
- Length: 2 km (1.2 mi)

Major junctions
- West end: Spencer Street; Melbourne CBD
- King Street; William Street; Queen Street; Elizabeth Street; Swanston Street; Russell Street; Exhibition Street
- East end: Spring Street; Melbourne CBD

Location(s)
- LGA(s): City of Melbourne
- Suburb(s): Melbourne CBD

Flinders Lane is a minor street and thoroughfare in the Melbourne central business district of Victoria, Australia. The laneway runs east–west from Spring Street to Spencer Street in-between Flinders and Collins streets. Originally laid out as part of the Hoddle Grid in 1837, the laneway was once the centre of Melbourne's rag trade and is still home to boutique designers and high-end retailers including Chanel, now perched alongside numerous upscale hotels like the W Hotel Melbourne and Adelphi Hotel, loft apartments, cafes and bars.

Many historic buildings are found on Flinders Lane with a history of strict height limits helping to preserve the buildings from redevelopment. Despite the loss of some significant buildings over time, it is still known for its SoHo atmosphere and well-preserved historic buildings.

== History ==
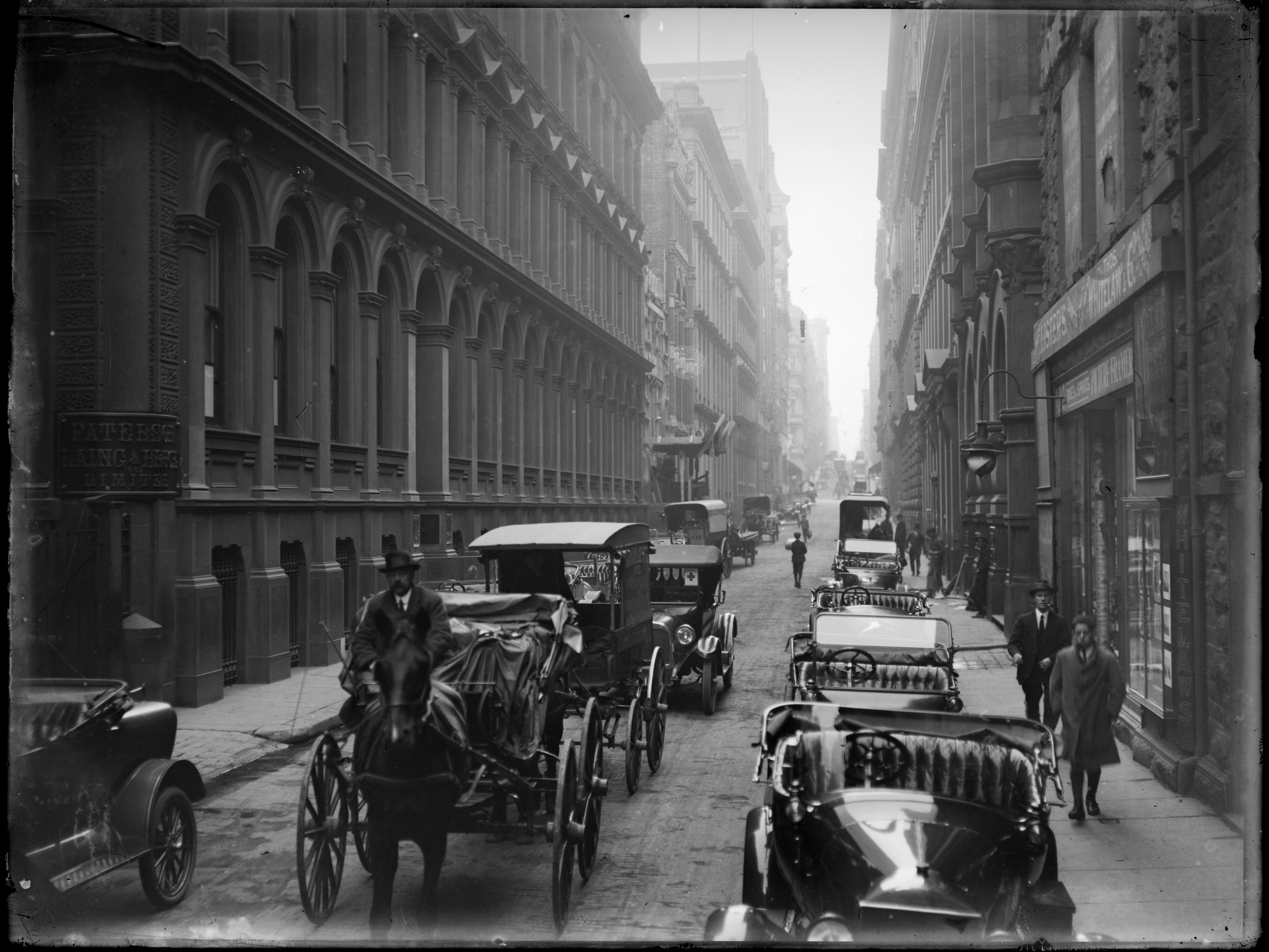
Looking down Flinders Lane, ca. 1891 - ca. 1914

=== Garment Trade ===
In the 1880s, large soft-goods import warehouses established Flinders Lane as the heart of the clothing trade. This was because of the Lane's proximity to wharves and railway stations, and centrality to Melbourne's population.

For over one hundred years ‘The Lane’ was an Australian institution due to its clothing and textiles (the schmatte trade). Buyers could come from the country and ‘do’ the Lane in one session, which featured many Jewish migrant businesses. For a large part of the twentieth century the garment trade remained an important industry in Flinders Lane. The number of clothing firms on the street reached 610 in 1939, and this level of activity was maintained until the early 1960s. In the 1960s and 1970s these businesses began to close due to changing requirements for space and labour, rising rents and traffic congestion.

=== Hells Angels Shootings ===
On Monday 18 June 2007, a shooting incident occurred on the corner of Flinders Lane and William Street when Hells Angels member Christopher Hudson shot and killed Brendan Keilar and wounded two others. Keilar was posthumously awarded the Royal Humane Society of Australasia's medal for bravery as he was shot and killed after intervening to save one of the victims.

== Notable buildings ==
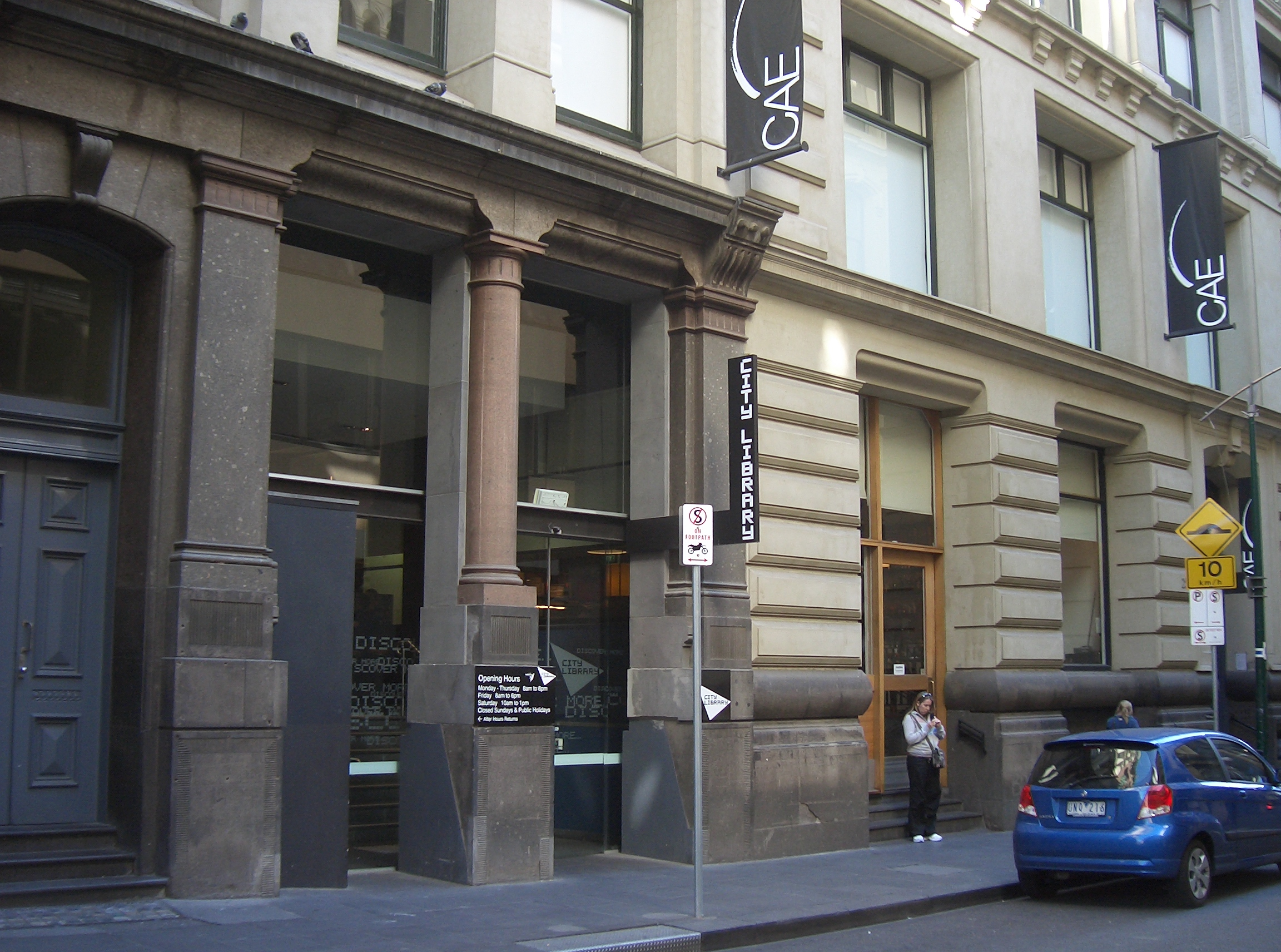
The City Library building between Swanston and Elizabeth Streets.

Flinders Lane has many notable multi-storey warehouses and buildings, some of which were added to the Victorian Heritage Register or added to a non-statutory list by the Victorian branch of the National Trust, including:

- Murray House (1880)
- Leicester House (1886) by T J Crouch
- Chapter House (1891) by William Butterfield
- Ross House (1898), designed as a warehouse by Sir John Sulman and Power, repurposed as an office building
- Tomasetti Warehouse (1899) by H W & F B Tompkins
- Milton House (1901) by Sydney Smith & Ogg
- Manchester House (1911) by Bates Peebles & Smart
- Majorca Building (1928) by Harry Norris

Other buildings now lost include:

- Australian Building (1889) by Henry Kemp , a 12-storey Queen Anne building third tallest in the world when completed, demolished 1980
- Champions Hotel (1905) on the corner of Swanston Street, demolished 1972
- Western Market (1841) on the block bounded by Market, Collins and William streets, demolished 1961
- New Zealand Loan and Mercantile Agency Company Woolstore (1882) at 522 Flinders Lane, demolished 1973

== Transport ==
There is a short section of the street between Collins and Market streets that the route 58 tram runs down.

Though there is no other public transport running down Flinders Lane itself, the street is well connected due to the surrounding rail, tram and bus infrastructure.
