= Eastern Market =

Eastern Market may refer to:

in Australia

- Eastern Market, Melbourne

in the United States

- Eastern Market, Detroit, Michigan
- Eastern Market, Washington, D.C., a marketplace listed on the NRHP
  - Eastern Market (Washington Metro), a transit station
