= Southern Cross Tower =

161-metre (530 ft) skyscraper in Melbourne, Victoria, Australia

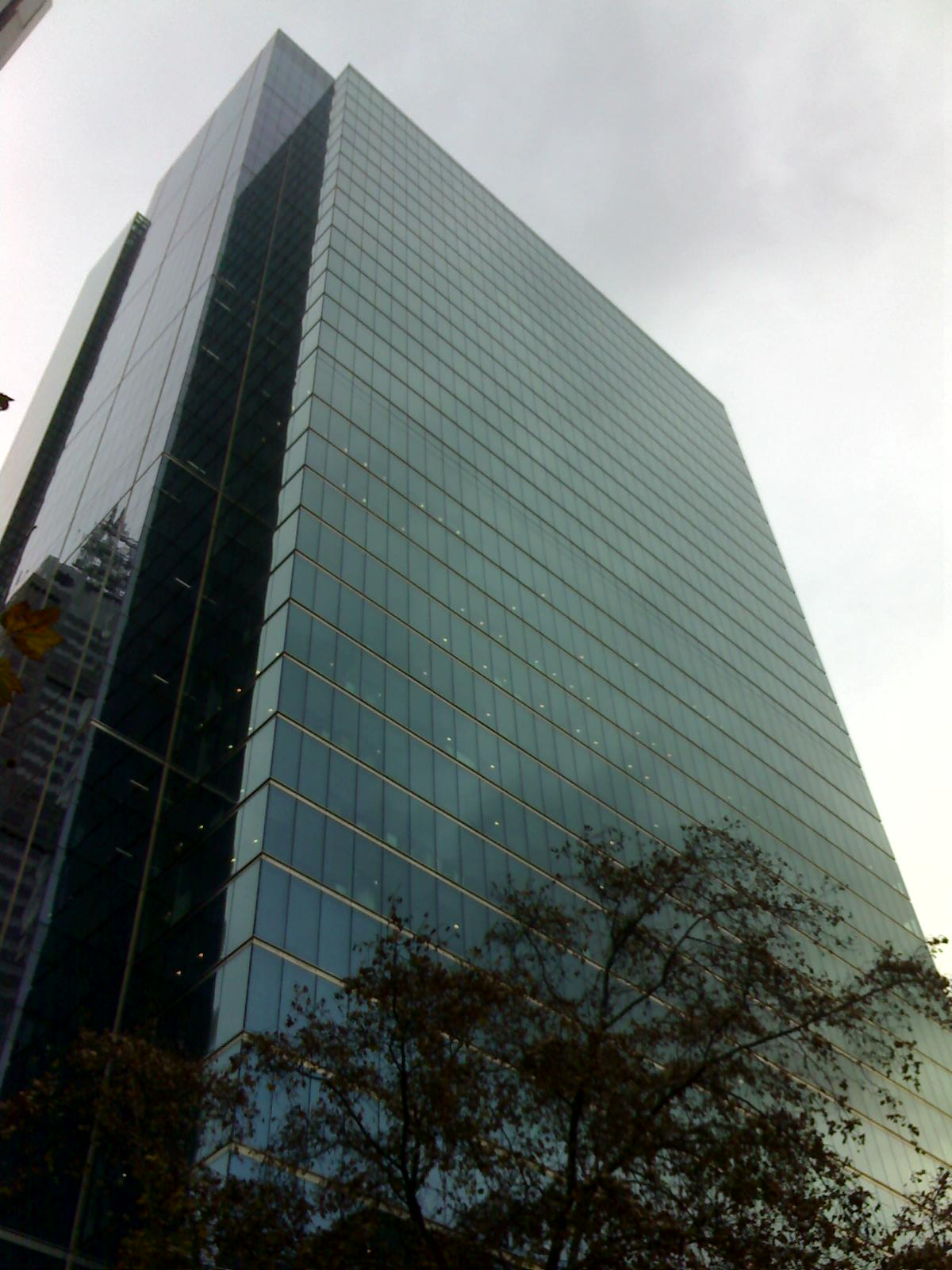
- East Tower (SX1) in June 2009

General information
- Type: Office
- Location: 121 Exhibition Street, Melbourne, Victoria
- Coordinates: 37°48′46″S 144°58′13″E
- Completed: 2004
- Opened: 2004

Height
- Roof: 161 m (528 ft)

Technical details
- Floor count: 39

Design and construction
- Architect: Woods Bagot

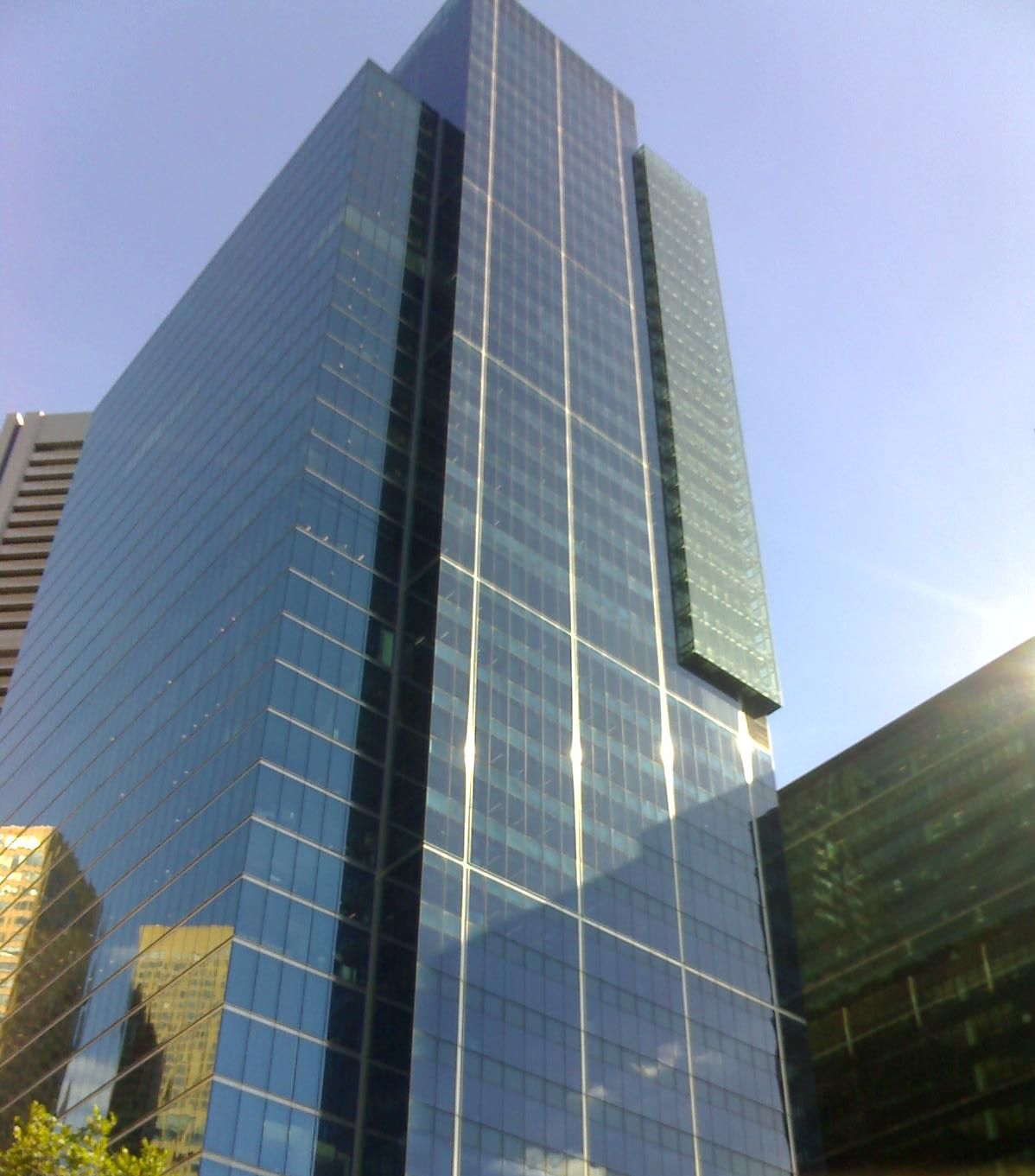
North side of SX1

Southern Cross Tower, also known as 121 Exhibition Street, is a 161-metre (530 ft) skyscraper in Melbourne, Victoria, Australia. The tower was built in 2004 and comprises 39 levels of office accommodation. The complex is a twin tower. The SX1 (or East tower) delivers 76,700 square meters of space over 39 floors. The SX2 (or West Tower) provides 45,200 square metres and 22 levels. The tower was once the location of Melbourne's prestigious Southern Cross Hotel. As of November 2026, the SX1 is the 62nd-tallest building in Melbourne.

== History ==
Before development of Southern Cross, the Victorian Government was concerned because its key departments were scattered among more than 15 office buildings throughout the Melbourne central business district. It decided to consolidate financially and allow the bureaucracy closer access to Spring Street, giving it access to the Parliament and Treasury. A consortium of private bodies, including Multiplex and Babcock & Brown, suggested a skyscraper in the location of the old and derelict Southern Cross Hotel. A key condition of the Victorian government's involvement in the project was its demand that the building be a state-of-the-art, environmentally sustainable development.

== Ownership ==
The building is 75 per cent owned by Multiplex Property Trust and 25 per cent owned by Multiplex Acumen Prime Property Fund. According to valuer Jones Lang Lasalle, the building's current market value is A$130 million and its major tenant is the Victorian State Government.

== Tenants ==
SX1 (East Tower) is occupied by the Victorian Government's Department of Justice and Regulation (DJR), some branches of the Department of Jobs, Precincts and Regions (DJPR) and the State Revenue Office (SRO).

SX2 (West Tower) is home to Australia Post and the Energy and Water Ombudsman (Victoria) (EWOV).

== Gallery ==
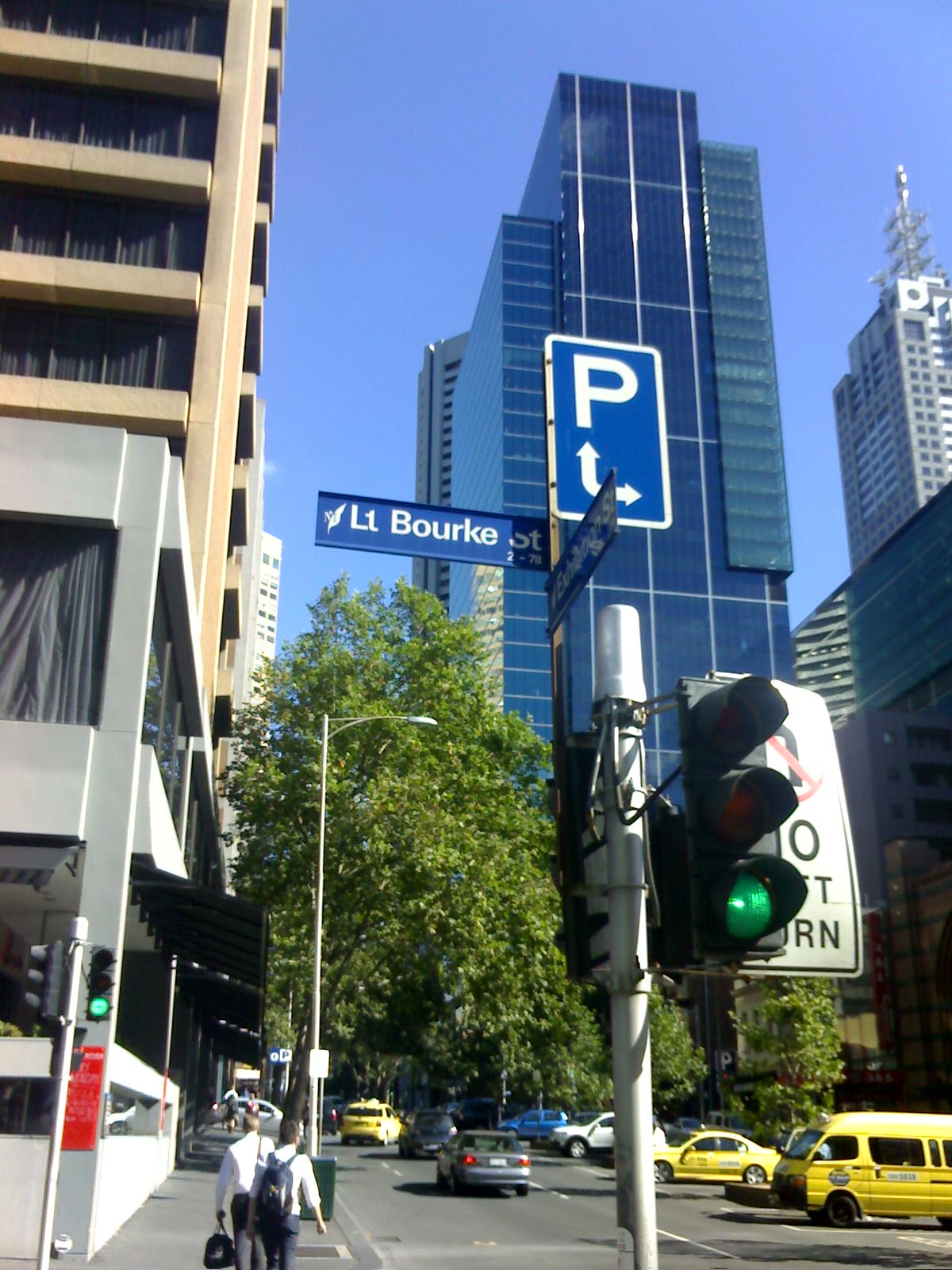
Southern Cross East Tower (SX1) from corner of Little Bourke Street and Exhibition Street

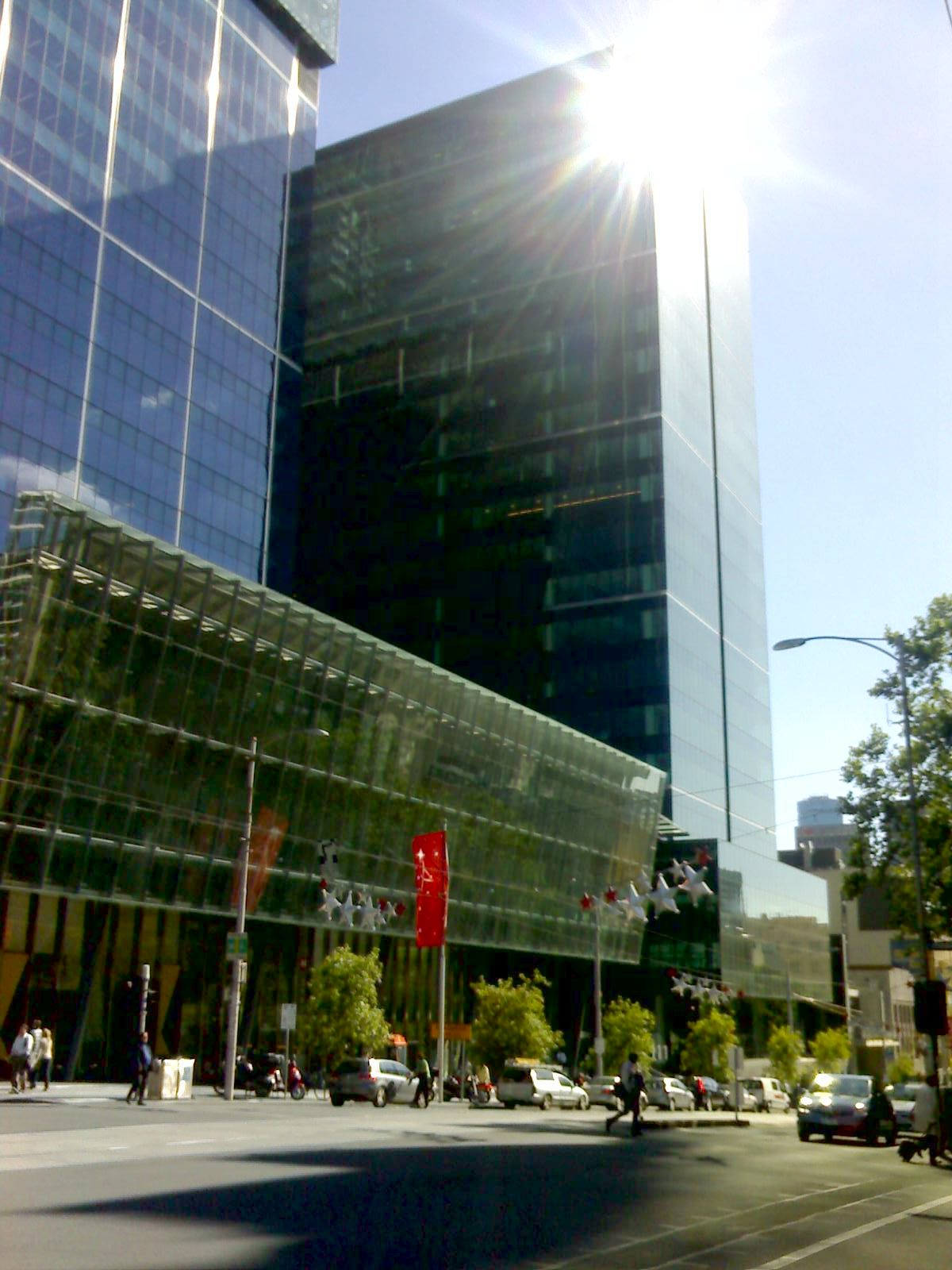
Southern Cross West Tower (SX2)
