= Milton House (Melbourne) =

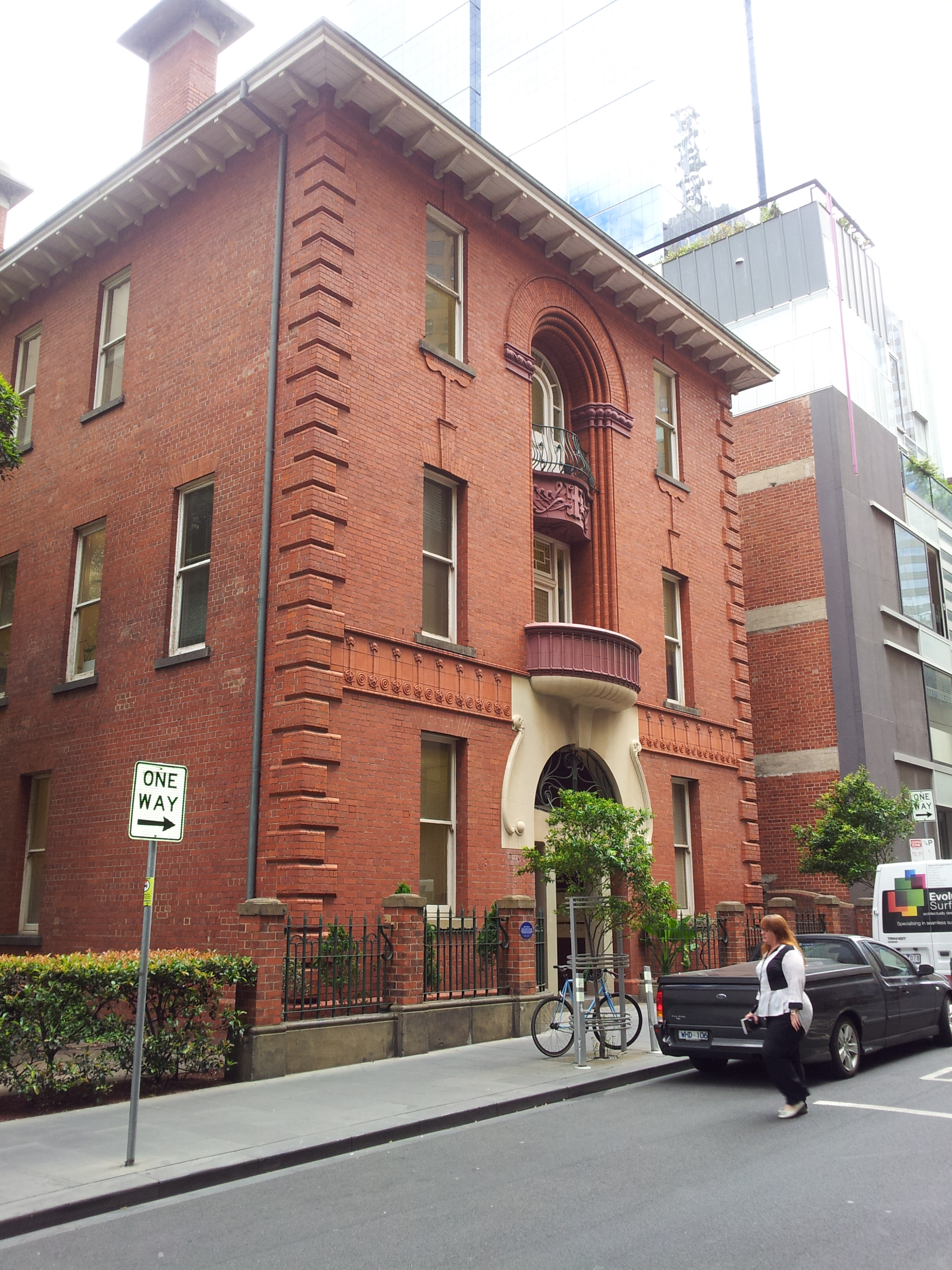
- Milton House
- Interactive map of the Milton House area

General information
- Architectural style: Art Nouveau
- Location: Melbourne, Australia, 21-25 Flinders Lane
- Coordinates: 37°48′53″S 144°58′25″E
- Completed: 1901

Design and construction
- Architects: Sydney Smith & Ogg; Robert Joseph Haddon

Milton House is a historic building located at 21–25 Flinders Lane, Melbourne, Australia.

It was built in 1901 as a private hospital for the eminent Melbourne surgeon, William Moore, who was the first master of surgery graduate of the University of Melbourne. Its location on a street that was originally largely warehouses was likely linked to the concentration of medical professionals at the top end of Collins Street nearby. Later it became a rooming house, then in 1950 reverted to a medical use as an X-ray facility run by the Victorian Health Commission as part of the postwar campaign to fight tuberculosis. It later became government offices, then private offices.

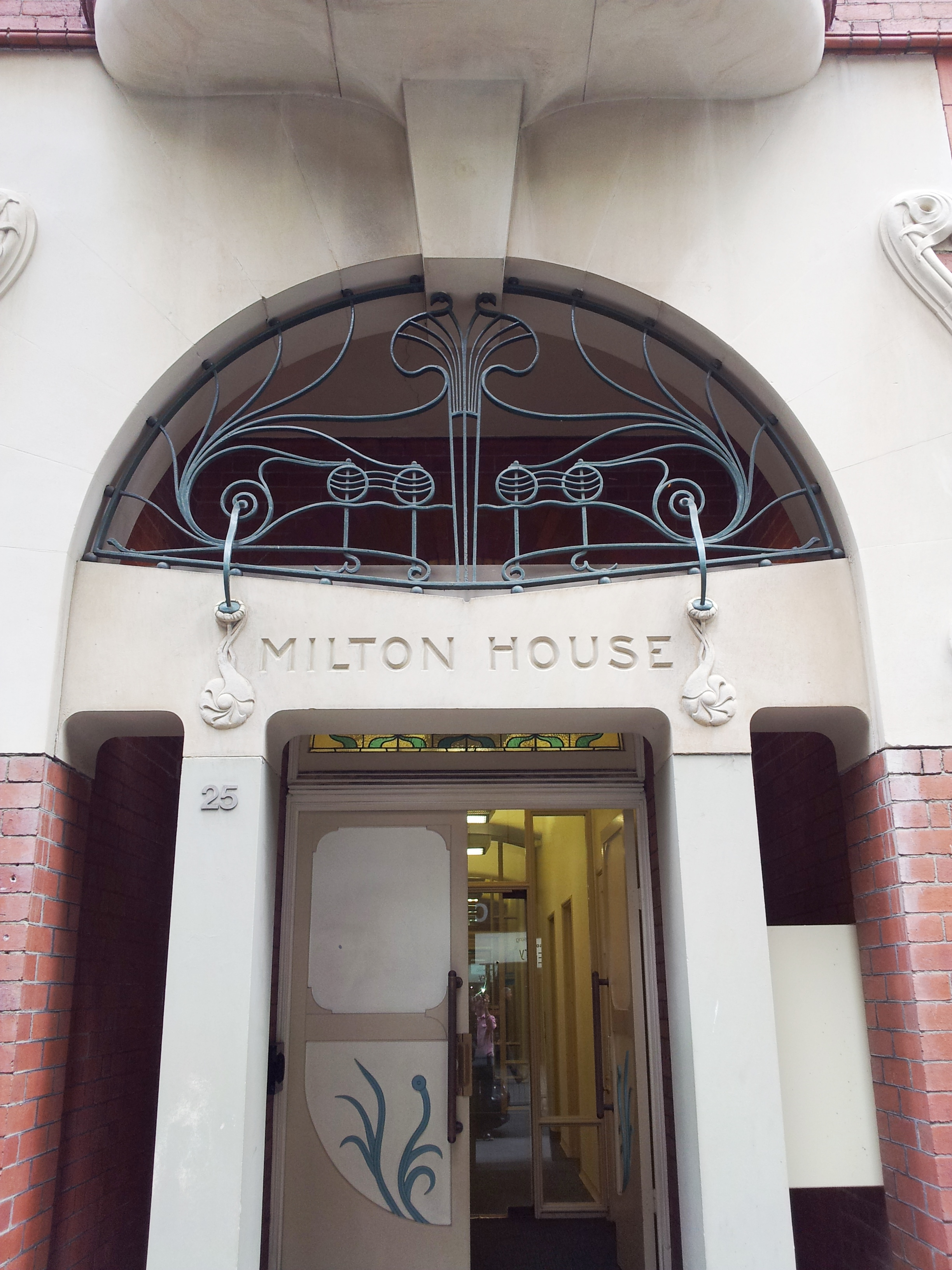
Detail of entry arch

It is significant for its architectural features, a broadly Georgian composition with a Romanesque arch, and especially the detailing in the Art Nouveau style. The architects were listed as Sydney Smith & Ogg, but it is thought that architect Robert Joseph Haddon (1866–1929) was responsible for the Art Nouveau decorative elements such as the ornamental terracotta band, the sinuous entrance arch, and the wrought-iron work within the arch, and the door.

It is listed on the Victorian Heritage Register.

In 2022, an office tower was proposed that would occupying the small plaza next door, and partly overhang Milton House.
