= Perrott Lyon Timlock & Kesa =

Australian architectural firm

- Industry: Architectural design
- Predecessor: Leslie M Perrott & Partners; Perrott Lyon Mathieson
- Founded: 1970; 55 years ago
- Headquarters: Melbourne, Australia

Perrott Lyon Timlock & Kesa was an Australian architecture firm based in Melbourne, formed in 1970, from Leslie M Perrott & Partners, and which became Perrott Lyon Mathieson in 1976. They are best known for Nauru House at 80 Collins Street, briefly Australia's tallest. In 1973 they won a Victorian Architecture Medal Award of Merit for their MMBW House in Melbourne.

== Buildings ==
- Nauru House, Melbourne, 1972-1977
- Melbourne and Metropolitan Board of Works (MMBW House), Melbourne, 1976 ^{[usurped]}
- Ansett House, Swanston Street, 1976–1978.
