= Market Street, Melbourne =

Street in Melbourne, Victoria

Coordinates: 37°49′7″S 144°57′39″E

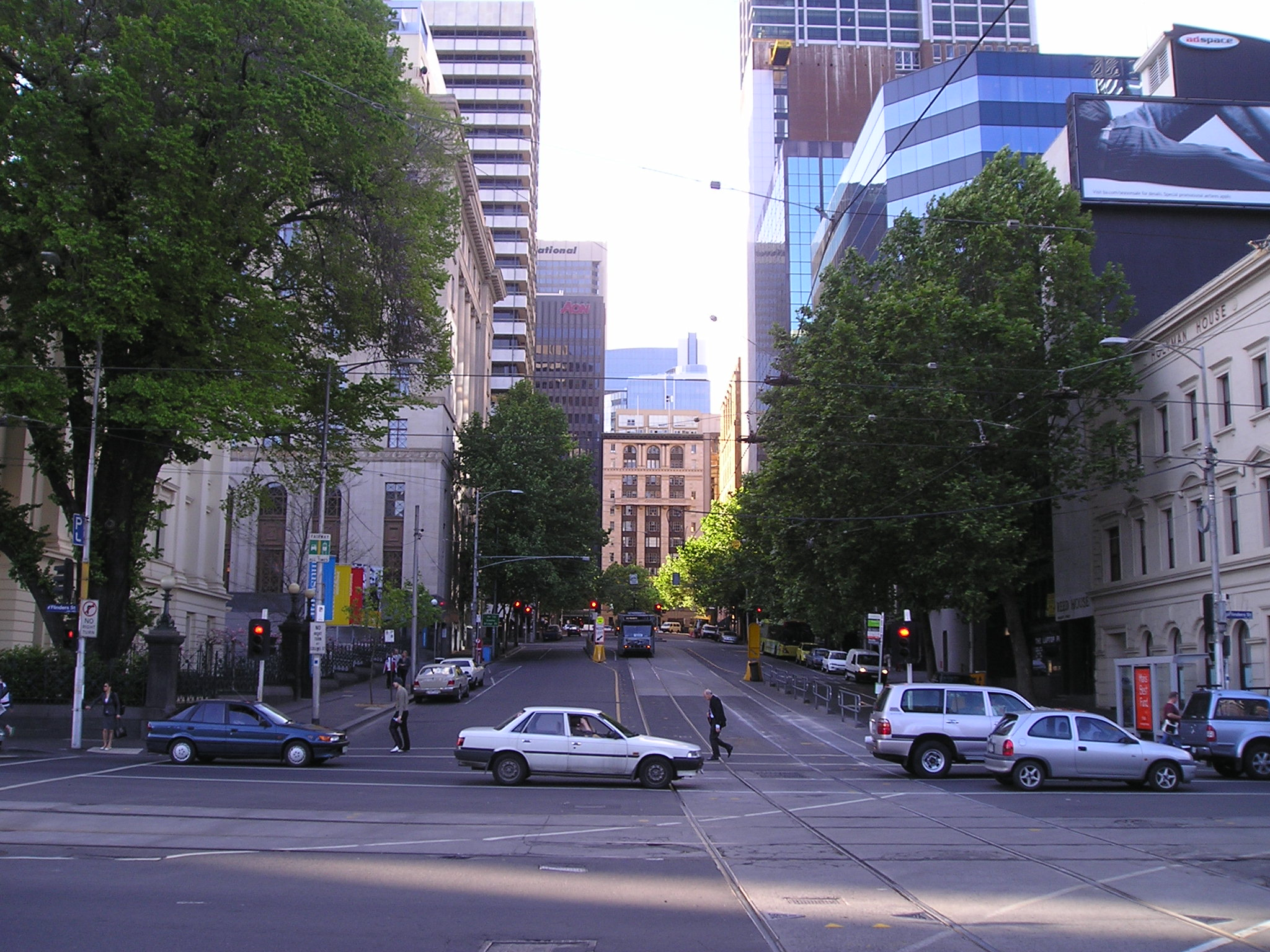
Market Street, facing north from Flinders Street

Market Street is one of the north–south streets in the Melbourne central business district, Australia, part of the Hoddle Grid laid out in 1837.

Market Street is the only major deviation to the Hoddle Grid, in that it only runs between Flinders Street and Collins Street, such that its vista is terminated by the art-deco Temple Court building on Collins Street.

South of Flinders Street, the roadway continues across the Yarra River via Queens Bridge.

The street was named after the Western Market, Melbourne's first official fresh food and vegetable market, which operated on the site now occupied by Collins Arch, bordered by Collins, Market and William Streets, and Flinders Lane.

Adjacent to Collins Arch is the site of what was described as Melbourne CBD's first new urban park in thirty years, Market Street Park, which opened in 2021. Designed by Oculus, it includes greenery, seating and a water feature with sandstone blocks and a banksia cone sculpture.

Tram route 58 runs along Market Street between Flinders Lane and Flinders Street.
