= Exhibition Street =

Street in Melbourne, Victoria

Exhibition Street Victoria
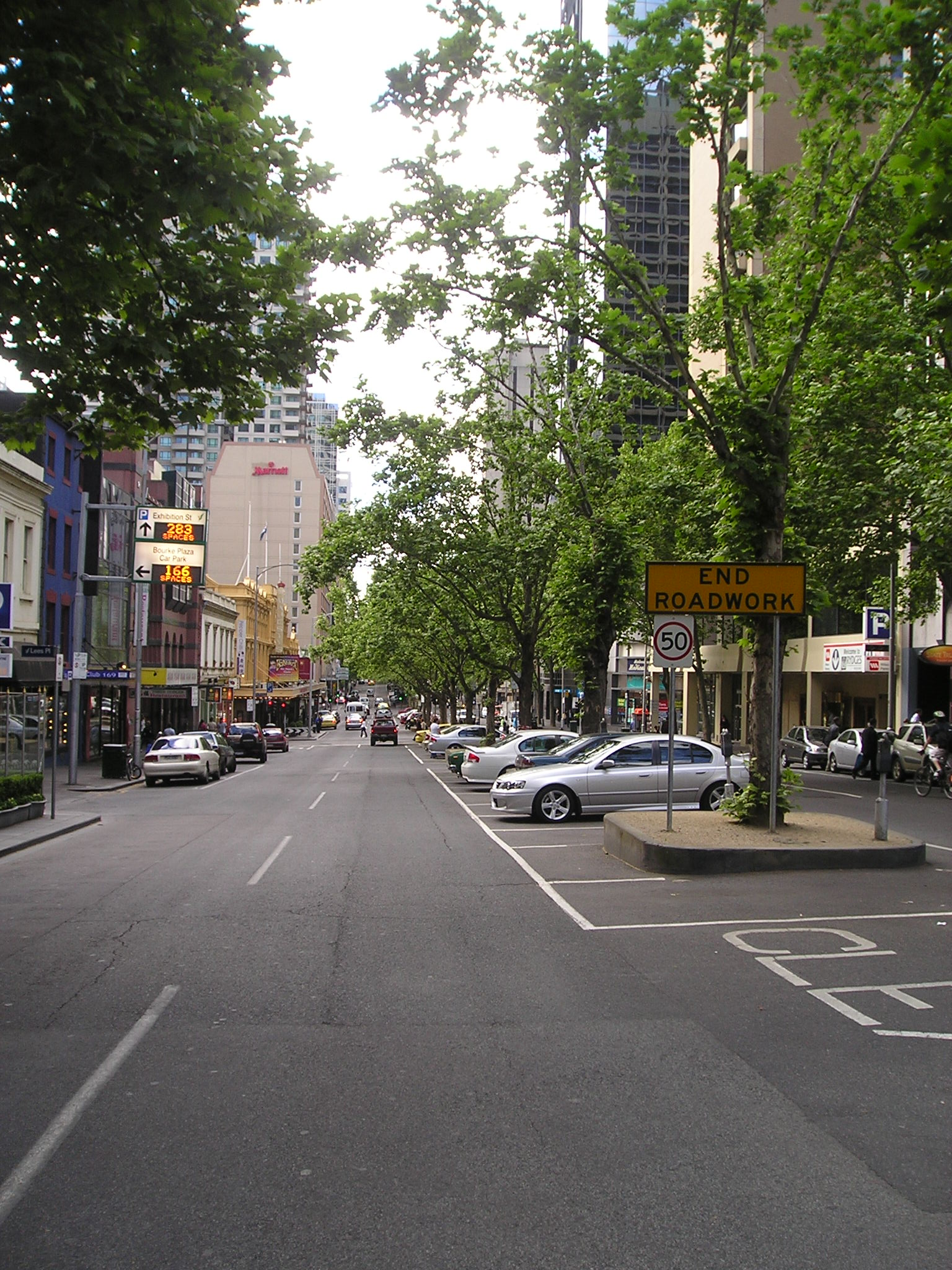
- Exhibition Street looking north from Bourke Street
- Coordinates: 37.8130411°S 144.97107270000004°E

General information
- Type: Street
- Length: 1 km (0.6 mi)
- Opened: 1837
- Former route number: State Route 46 (1965–1989)

Major junctions
- North end: Rathdowne Street; Carlton, Melbourne
- Victoria Street; La Trobe Street; Lonsdale Street; Bourke Street; Collins Street; Flinders Street
- South end: Batman Avenue; Melbourne CBD

Location(s)
- LGA(s): City of Melbourne
- Suburb(s): Melbourne CBD

Exhibition Street is a major street in the Melbourne central business district, Australia. The street is named after the International Exhibition held at the Royal Exhibition Building in 1880, and was previously known as Stephen Street from 1837. The street runs roughly north–south and was laid out as part of the original Hoddle Grid.

== Geography ==
Situated in the east of the Melbourne central business district, Exhibition Street is a major thoroughfare for city traffic.

At its southern end, Exhibition Street becomes Batman Avenue after its intersection with Flinders Street and the Batman Avenue Bridge. Batman Avenue links the central business district to the Monash Freeway, and the section immediately south of Flinders Street is also known as the Exhibition Street Extension. At its northern end it becomes Rathdowne Street, which runs along the western edge of the Carlton Gardens, Royal Exhibition Building and Melbourne Museum.

== History ==
=== Founding as Stephen Street ===
Stephen Street, as Exhibition Street was originally known, was established in April 1837 as one of the eight north–south streets on Robert Hoddle's original survey of Melbourne. Stephen Street was named as a tribute to James Stephen, the Permanent Undersecretary for the British Colonies in London who was at the peak of his power within the Colonial Office at the time of the naming of the streets in the Hoddle Grid.

In 1847, the Eastern Market was opened on the corner of Stephen Street and Bourke Street. It was the second major market in Melbourne, after the Western Market. It was intended to be Melbourne's main fresh food market, but it proved less popular than the Queen Victoria Market, and eventually became more like an amusement park. It was demolished in 1960.

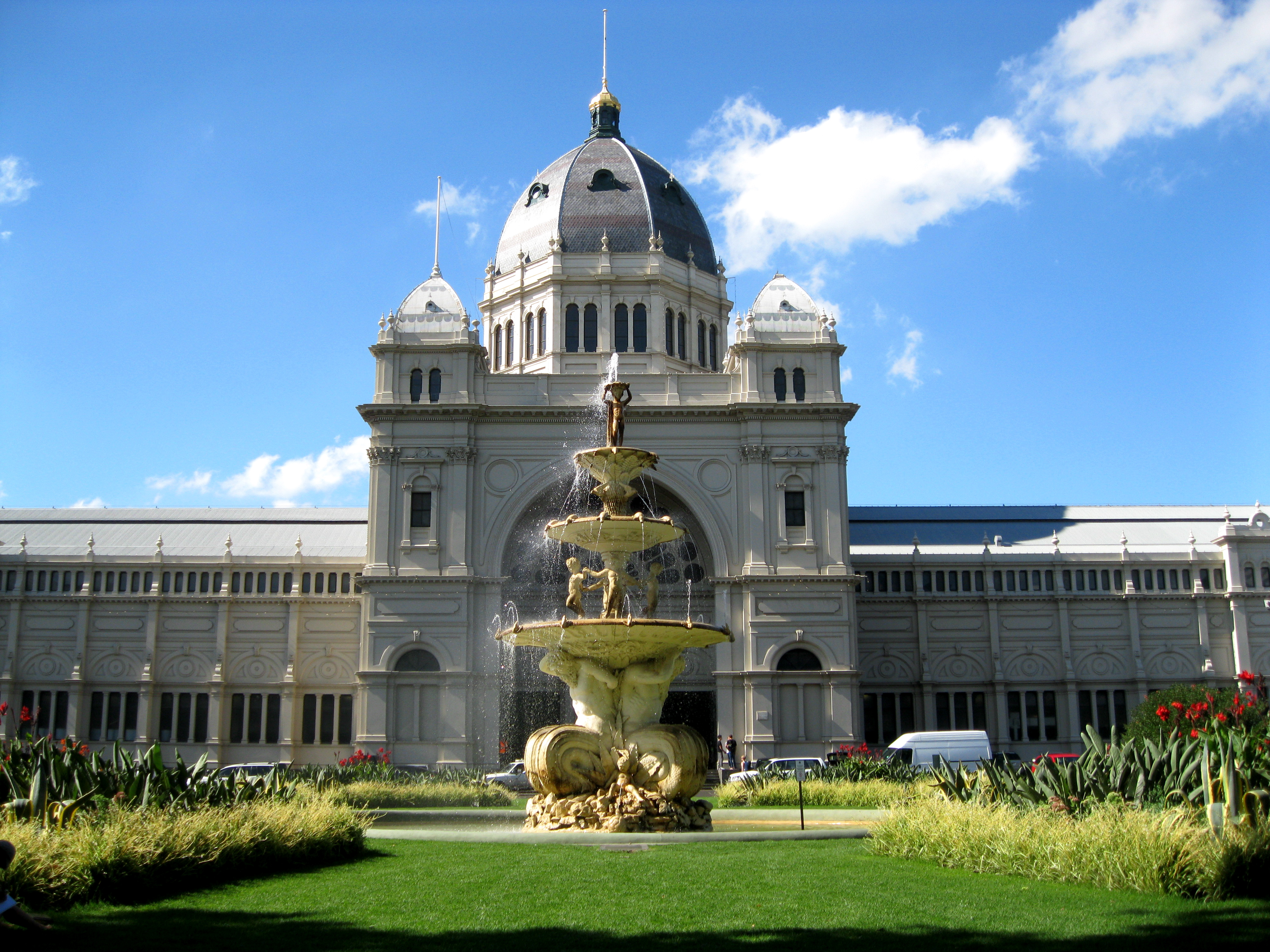
Royal Exhibition Building

=== Renaming to Exhibition Street ===
Stephen Street was renamed Exhibition Street by Melbourne City Council on 5 December 1898. It was renamed to celebrate the 1880 International Exhibition and the 1888 Centennial Exhibition, both held at the Royal Exhibition Building during the boom time of Marvellous Melbourne. The change only applied to the portion of Stephen Street north of Collins Street. The remainder was called Collins Place, and kept that name until it became part of Exhibition Street in 1963.

=== Exhibition Street Extension ===
The Exhibition Street Extension project, later renamed Batman Avenue, was announced by the State Government in 1997 and opened in October 1999, with CityLink operator Transurban operating the road and collecting tolls from road users.

The project included a four lane divided road over the Jolimont railyards, enabling the original alignment of Batman Avenue west of Melbourne Park to be closed. In addition the route 70 tram was removed from Swan Street, and rerouted to dedicated tracks between the sporting precinct and the railway lines, before crossing the new bridge and turning into Flinders Street. The Exhibition Street Extension was not part of the initial CityLink project announcement, as it had been promoted as a bypass that would keep cars out of the CBD.

== Notable buildings ==
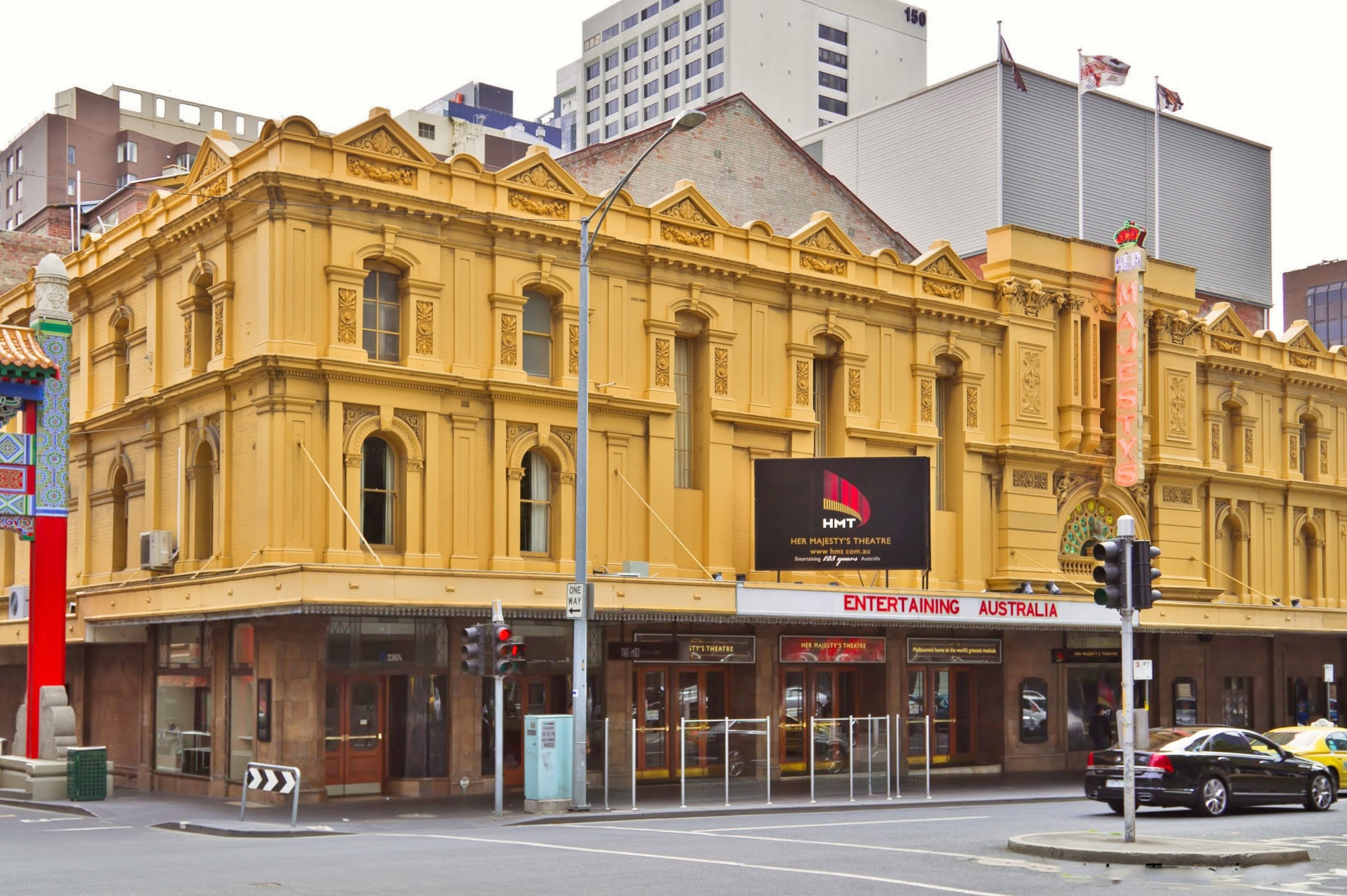
Her Majesty's Theatre

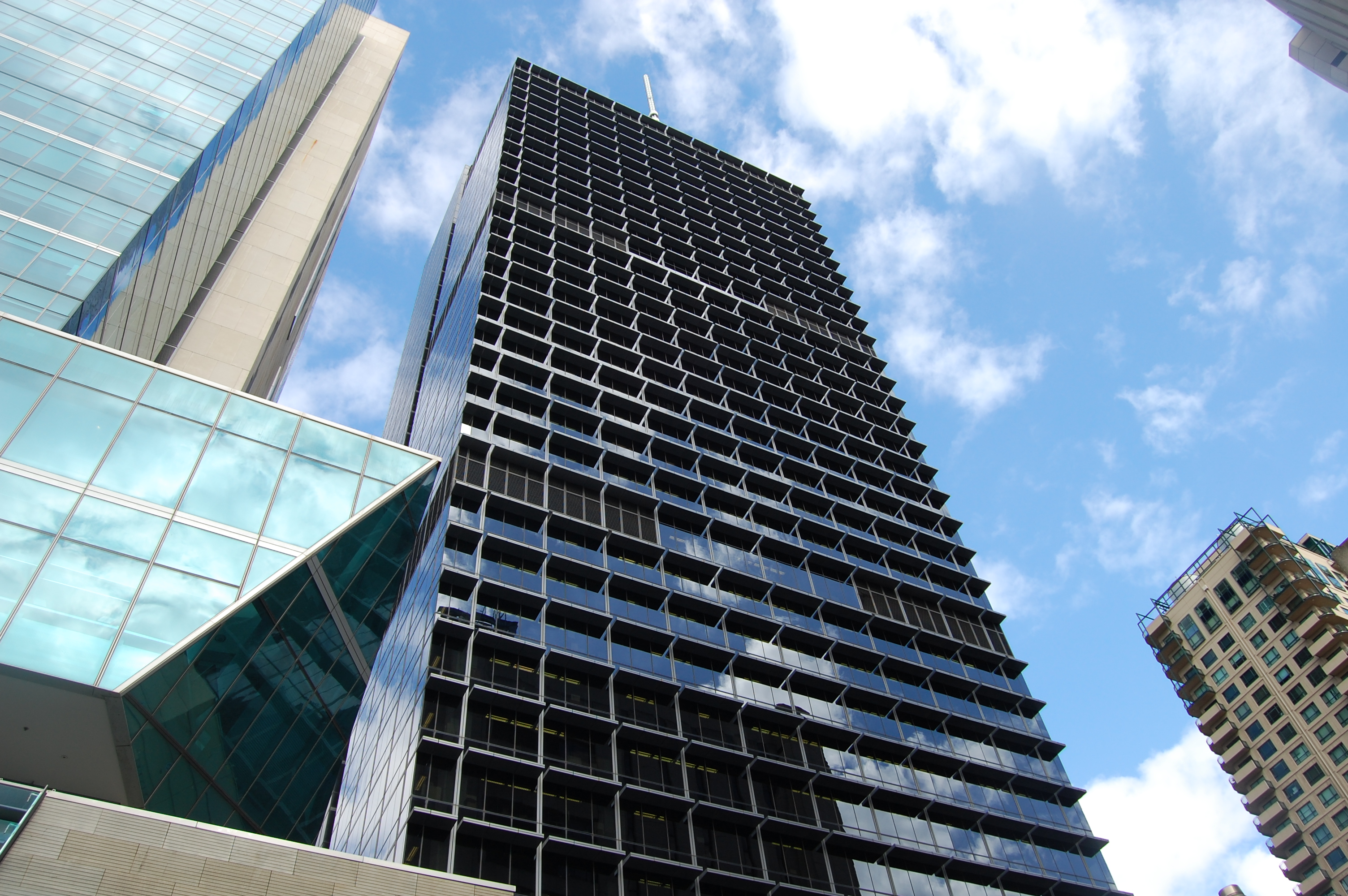
Telstra Corporate Centre

Exhibition Street is a commercial district lined by skyscrapers and home to many of Melbourne's tallest buildings. It is also home to many heritage buildings listed on the Victorian Heritage Register and/or classified by National Trust of Australia. These include:

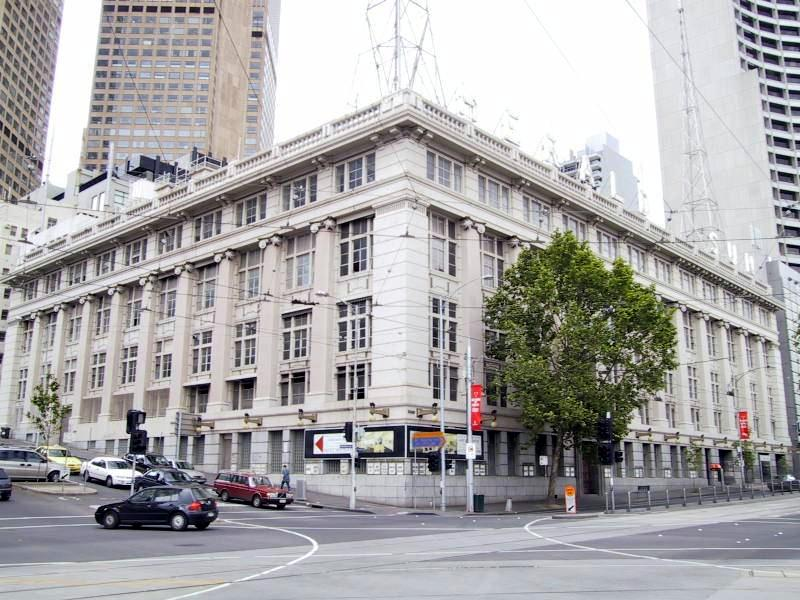
Herald & Weekly Times Building, prior to the addition of the skyscraper Eight Exhibition Street

=== Listed buildings ===
- Cooper's Inn Pub (1853)
- Former London Chartered Bank (1859)
- Former Mickveh Yisrael Synagogue and School (1877)
- Her Majesty's Theatre (1886)
- Friendly Societies House (1891)
- P Ng Hong Nam Building (1910)
- Herald & Weekly Times Building (1921)
- Comedy Theatre (1928)

=== Skyscrapers ===
- Reserve Bank of Australia building (1973)
- Collins Place (1981)
- SX1 (Southern Cross Tower) (2004)
- Australia Post Headquarters (2009)
- Telstra Corporate Centre (1992)
- Ernst & Young Tower (2005)
- Marriott Hotel
- Rydges Hotel
- Mantra 100 Exhibition (formerly the Pacific International)
