= Eastern Market, Melbourne =

Eastern Market
- Interactive map of the Eastern Market area

General information
- Status: Demolished
- Type: Public food, produce, entertainment and flea market
- Location: Melbourne, Victoria, Australia
- Coordinates: 37.8126°S 144.9700°E
- Completed: 1847
- Demolished: 1960
- Owner: City of Melbourne

The Eastern Market (also known as Paddys Market) was one of the three markets established in central business district of Melbourne, Victoria, Australia in the 1840s. It operated from 1847 until the demolition of its buildings in 1960.

The Market began as a general second-hand market but went through several changes of use over its 113 years of operation including as a fruit and vegetable market, entertainment precinct and town square. It declined in popularity and importance as the Queen Victoria Market took away trade from both the Eastern and Western Market.

== History ==
=== Establishment ===
Early planning in the early years of Melbourne called for several market spaces to be created within or near the central grid of streets laid out by surveyor Robert Hoddle.

At the time Melbourne was under the administration of New South Wales and in 1841, commissioners were appointed to find sites for a future market in Melbourne. In 1846 three sites were gazetted for this purpose:

- 11 acres for a cattle market
- a one-acre site for a 'general market' (the Western Market on a block on the corner of William and Collins streets)
- a two-acre site for a 'general market' (the Eastern Market on a block on the corner of Bourke and Stephen – later Exhibition – streets).

The two smaller markets can be seen in Frederick Proeschel's 1853 'Mercantile' map of Melbourne with the annotation showing the Eastern Market had sections for hay, straw and fruit and housed a jail on its south-eastern corner (presumably the 'old female gaol, situated within the market area' referred to during redevelopment in 1859).

In a discussion at the Melbourne Town Council it was stated that 'between 1 September 1848 and 31 August 1849' income and expenses for the three markets were:

- Cattle Market – receipts £937 13s 1½d, expenses £168, 18 per cent
- Eastern Market – receipts £370 12s 8d, expenses £78, 20 per cent
- Western Market – receipts £275 2s 1d, expenses £78, 30 per cent

Despite the Western Market appearing to be the least profitable of the three, at a Council meeting the following month, Alderman Johnston argued 'the Eastern Market was a losing concern and...would most assuredly fall'. While this didn't eventuate supporters of the two general markets ensured there was lively debate about the future of both into the 1850s.

In 1871 a writer for The Australasian recalled the early years of the market in less than flattering terms:

It was originally a dreary waste with an ugly looking gaol shrinking away in the farthest corner of it, as if ashamed both of its purpose and of its appearance. Then hawkers, miscellaneous dealers, and houseless new arrivals pitched their tents upon it, and spread their motley merchandise along the edge of the footpath to allure the attention of passers-by. One summer morning as I turned out of Spring-street into Bourke-street I saw a whiff of flame spring from one of the tents and flash from end to end with inconceivable rapidity. It is no exaggeration to say that by the time I reached Stephen-street the encampment was a heap of ruins, and the owners of the tents were surveying their blackened ite with such a look of incredulity and amazement that there was quite as much of the ludicrous as of the pathetic in the incident. After this, I think, no more tents were suffered to be erected; but hay and corn factors set up their sentry-boxes on the scene of the fire; and then stall keepers were permitted to utilise the vacant ground; and there might be found the strangest assortment of damaged provisions to be met with outside of the New Cut, the Whitechapel-road or the High-street, Shoreditch. There were cheeses strong enough to waft their odour to Carlton, dried fruits that had been honeycombed by insects, salt fish of perdurable toughness, tins of jam and bottles of pickles with the shabbiest of anonymous labels, sides of bacon of wonderful antiquity, and a conglomerate of so-called dates which appeared to have been cemented together with paste blacking. Who bought those things? And, oh! by whom were they consumed? Sometimes I fancy that the vendors, finding no market for such unconsidered trifles, were driven to consume them themselves, and so perished miserably.

=== 1850s & 1860s ===
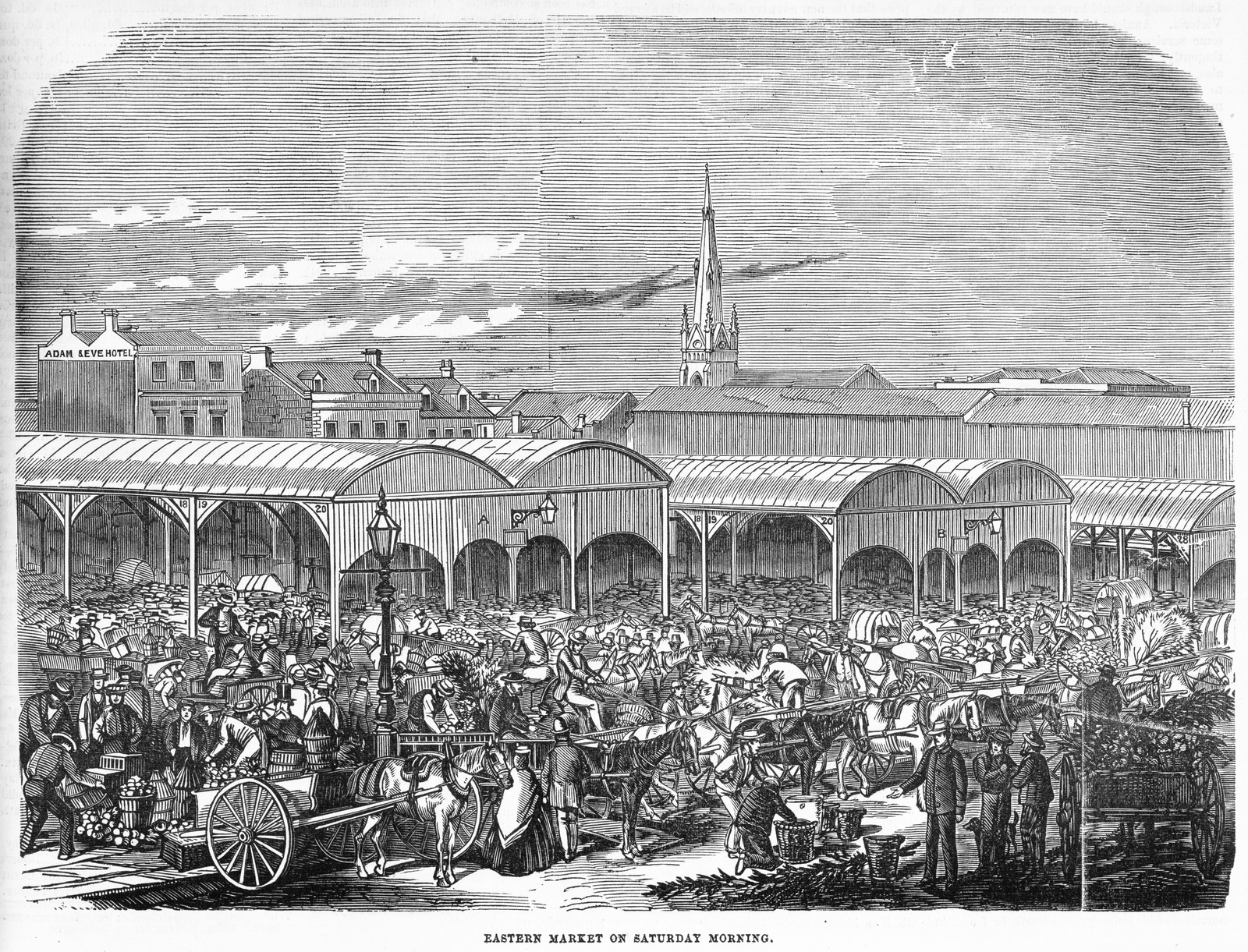
Wood engraving by Charles Frederick Somerton depicting a scene at the Eastern Market on a Saturday morning in 1862.

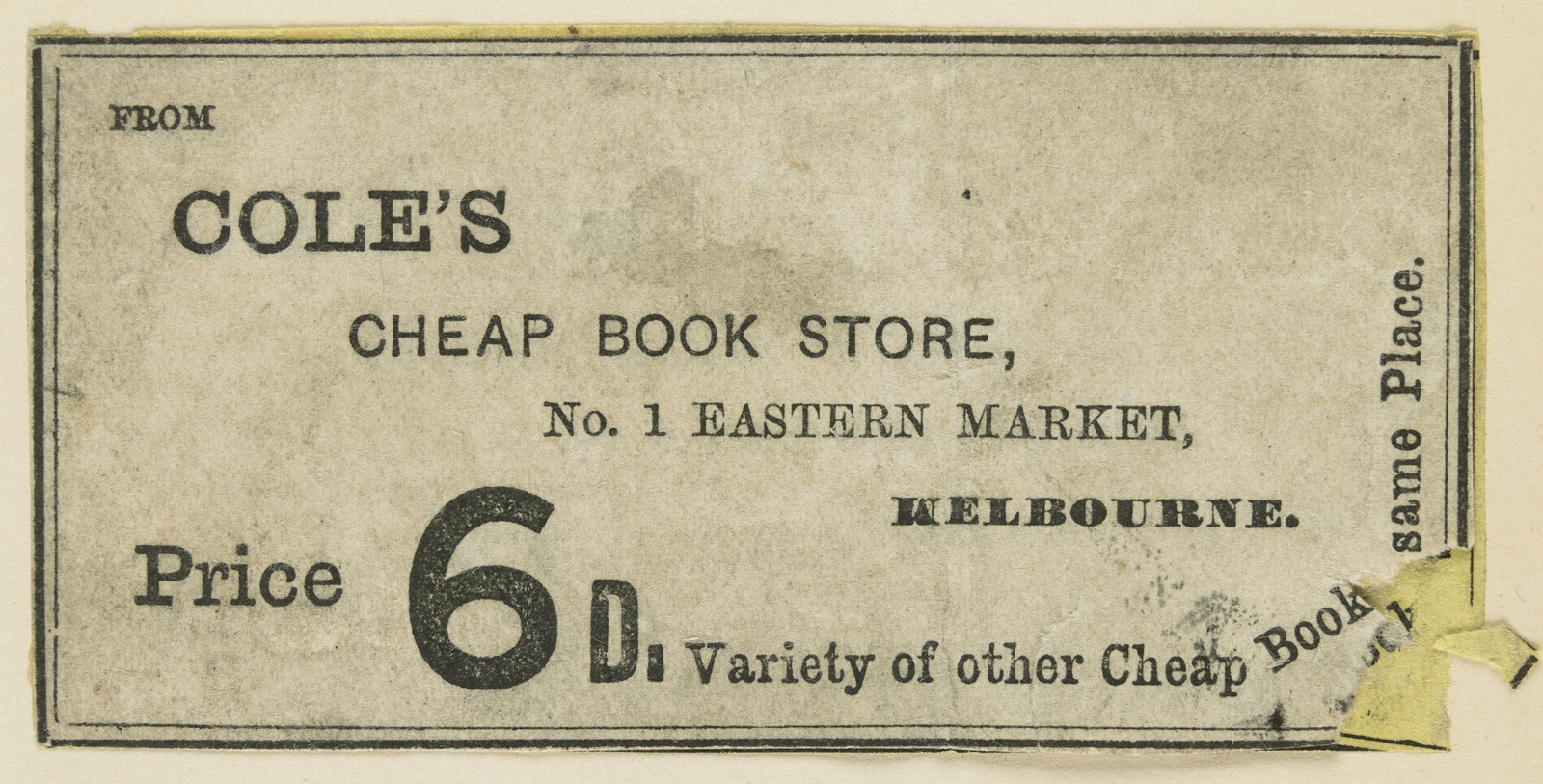
Ticket from the very first Cole's Book Store, which was located at the Eastern Market.

Descriptions of the Eastern Market from 1854 mention 'wooden buildings' erected 'for a temporary period under peculiar circumstances' and 'a gigantic wooden structure, a tunnel over the new weigh-bridge' which had 'a most frightful and enormous steep roof'. Nicholas Chevalier's 1862 wood engraving shows a crowd of people socialising in the market forecourt at night. While an 1864 hand colored lithograph by James Buckingham Philip titled 'The Eastern Market From The Top Of Whittington Tavern' sets the daytime scene with commercial activity around the four large markets sheds.

During the construction of the sheds ('210 feet long and 40 feet broad...substantially built and roofed with corrugated iron') The Argus described the Eastern Market's facilities and operation:

These sheds... are divided longitudinally into three compartments, the centre one, slightly raised, being devoted solely to purchasers. Into the side compartments, subdivided laterally by the supporting columns and numbered, market-carts will be backed, each subdivision holding two. The regular occupants of these will be the market-gardeners, who now pursue their avocation in the streets, much to the inconvenience of passengers whose business is other than the purchase of family comestibles. There is at present accommodation in the new market for 198 carts. At 9 o'clock in the morning the salesmen will be supposed to have finished their business, for the sheds must be cleared before half-past 9. On Wednesdays and Saturdays the hay markets will be held up to 2 o'clock on each day. On Saturday evenings, shortly after dusk, the whole of the sheds will be occupied by a guerrilla body of traders, who each pay a shilling per night for a standing 7½ feet wide.

It was also mentioned that application had been made to the Government for the recently vacated women's jail building in the south-east corner of the block and that it was hoped "at some future period, when finances are more flourishing than at present" the bricks from the jail, and the redevelopment, would be used "to build a row of shops, which are to face forward" onto Exhibition Street.

Two years later and the Eastern Market, wrote The Argus, was called 'our Covent Garden' (a reference to the famous market at Covent Garden in London established by the Duke of Bedford in the 1600s). Produce arrived from the 'many acres of land, within an easy distance of the city' that were:

under cultivation by market gardners – at Moorabbin, Dandenong, the Plenty, Heidelberg, Northcote, Merri Creek, Kew, Hawthorn, Richmond and Keilor. Our market site is within one-fourth as extensive a site as Covent Garden and when, as on a brisk market morning, it is attended by 700 drays loaded with produce, it affords a pleasureable surprise to any visitor who was previously unaware that a market of like pretentions was to be found in Melbourne. Some details of the quantities of the principal items may not be uninteresting... In the season about 1,200 loads of vegetables come into the market weekly (about seven or eight hundred weight each), consisting of every variety of vegetables known to Europeans, and the greater part of them in greater perfection than in the London markets; 500 geese and turkeys, 1,000 ducks and fowl, 1,000 dozen eggs, 100 suckling pigs, with an altogether unascertained but very appreciable number of rabbits, wild fowl, guinea fowl, pigeons, &c.; nearly half a ton of fresh butter is sold here every week, and honey in considerable quantities is brought through this channel before the public.

The availability of such a large public space also saw the establishment of the Eastern Market 'as a people's forum, the site of open-air services, meetings, lectures and political demonstrations'. After the extension of voting rights to all white men in 1858 a meeting was held there to lobby for an extension of time for voter registration before the next election. And 'between 5,000 and 6,000 persons' attended an 1860 meeting to debate laws that would open up Crown Land for selection.

=== 1870 to 1899 ===
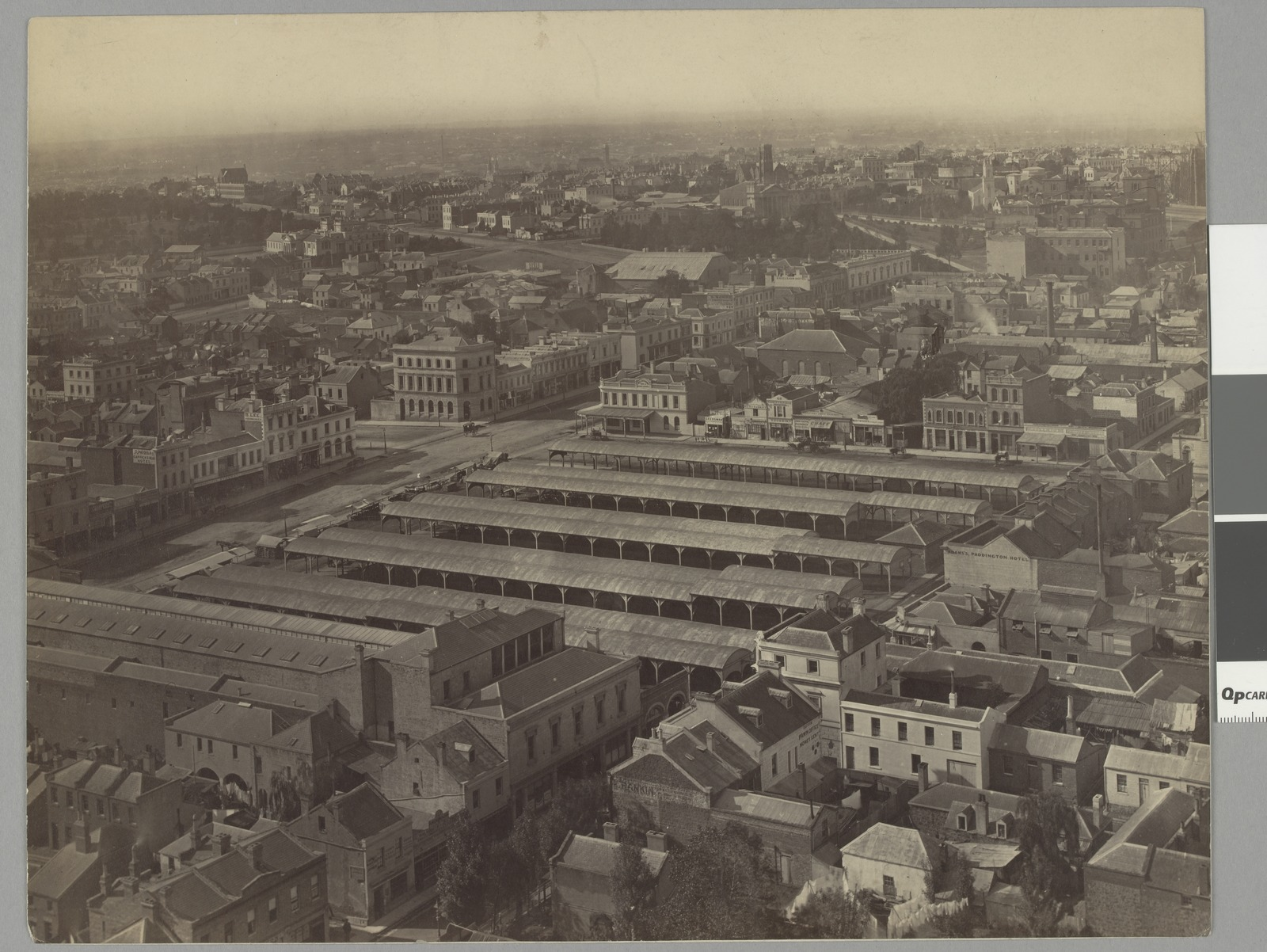
Aerial view of the original Eastern Market sheds prior to the sites renovation in 1879.

In 1870, and again in March 1871, tenders were called for the design of new market buildings but it wasn't until January 1877 that architects Reed and Barnes were commissioned. In March 1877 tenders for construction were called with the bid from Messers. Nation and Co. accepted shortly after at a contract price of £77,223 13s for an estimated 18 months work.

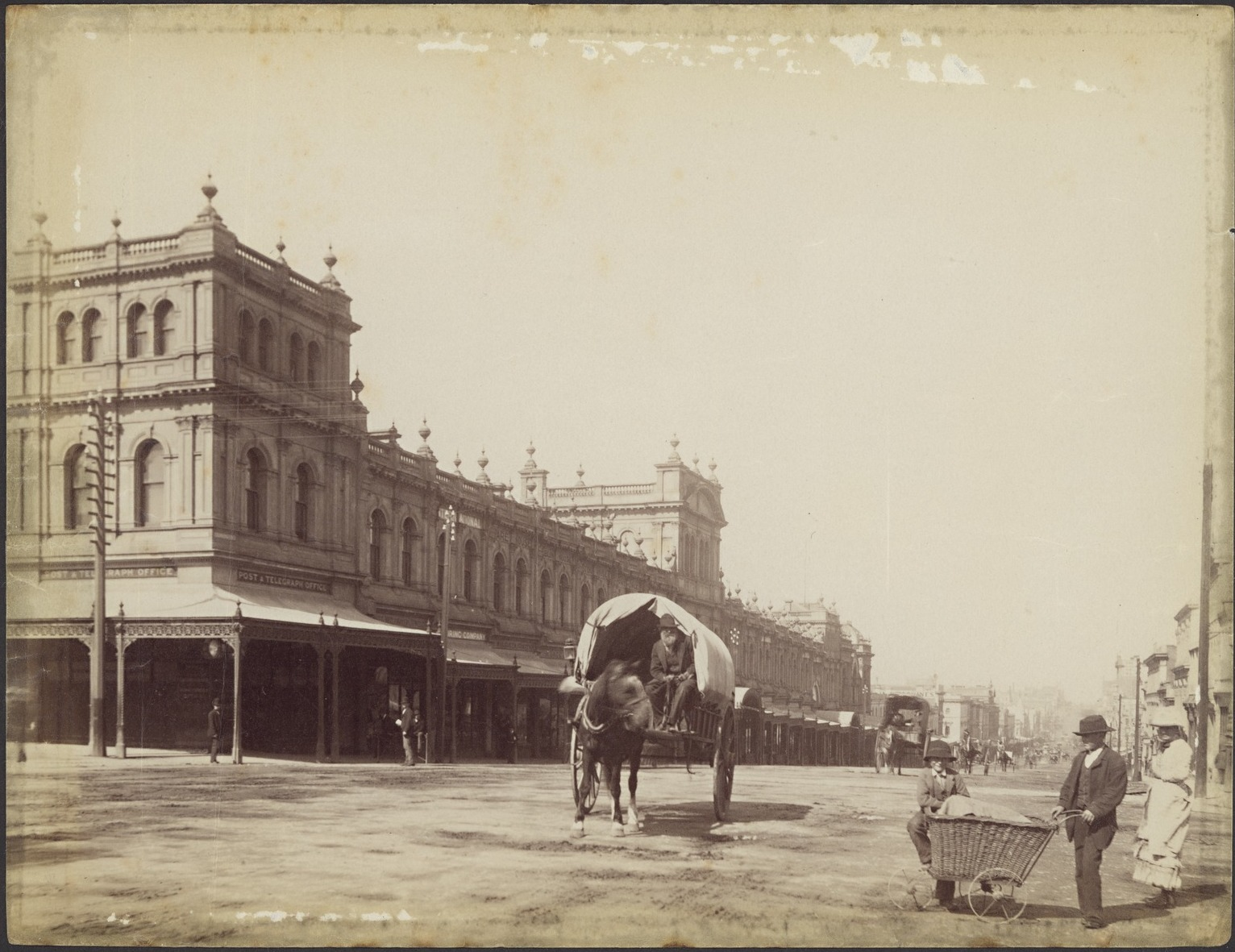
Eastern Market, Bourke St East (ca. 1876-1894) State Library Victoria, H2008.59/4

The new Eastern Market building was described in great detail by the Australasian Sketcher starting with its 'under floor...and extensive cellaring' (including 'a fountain to enable stall-holders to wash their vegetables'), 'the upper floor, or market proper' with space for 'enclosed stalls, 53 in number' and bordering this, on two sides, double-story shop rows facing onto Bourke and Stephen streets. They add 'The buildings are not lovely to look upon, but they are useful' and 'A commodious market, with ample accommodation for buyers and sellers, has long been wanted.' Engravings from the period show the exterior shop rows, the curved roof and pillars of the interior market space and an artist's impression of Saturday night scenes.

However, within a year of the new building's opening, that traders and customers who moved their business to Queen Victoria Market during the Eastern Market's lengthy redevelopment were not returning, with the Argus in 1880 reporting:

The handsome building erected by the City Corporation, known as the Eastern market, does not appear up to the present time to have answered the purpose for which it was intended. The market gardeners will not come there, but still prefer to go to the Victoria Market, and the tenants of the stalls inside the building complain that they are doing so little business that they cannot pay their rents. This complaint is certainly borne out by the appearance of things, for out of the 51 stalls round the sides of the building, no less than 24 are vacant, and during the day not more than a dozen persons are to be seen in the building.

A letter to the editor of The Argus on 10 February 1881 made the assertion that 'the market traffic should never have been removed' to the Queen Victoria Market and that the decision to do so 'was the result of a deep-laid scheme of log-rolling at the expense of the ratepayers'. The only redress, they argued, was 'that the Victoria Market, being now a wholesale market only, shall be strictly prohibited from any retail transactions whatever, and shall be closed punctually at 8am, at which hour all wholesale trade is finished.' The editorial response in the same edition suggested that design of the 'new' building was at fault:

What with outside shops and inside stalls, the proper area of the Eastern Market place has been so curtailed that carts cannot be allowed to occupy stands therein. In designing it, the idea was that they would enter, deposit their loads, and then pass out. Market gardeners, however, refused to fall in with this arrangement. They dislike unpacking articles which may be sold for delivery elsewhere, and they refuse to recognise the reasonableness of asking them to employ men and boys to take their carts and horses into the open streets, there to stand exposed to wind, rain, and the elements generally, until business is over. We venture to think that if the Corporation is intent on restoring the Eastern Market site to popularity, it will have to abolish a large number of the interior stalls, and make what provision it can for carts and those who wish to sell from them.

However, by April of that year, with no resolution to the issue of the two markets, even The Argus was airing its doubts:

When we call to mind what has been done, the influences which have been, and doubtless are still, at work, and when we find gentlemen intimately acquainted with corporation matters evidently suspicious as to the intentions of those immediately concerned in dealing with the market places, we may be forgiven if we assume that there is something going on that does not meet the public eye.

Entrepreneur EW Cole who had established a popular bookshop in the earlier market, and moved to nearby larger premises, offered to rent the whole of the market in 1881, to which the City of Melbourne agreed. He engaged a band, spent a comparatively large sum on advertising and installing electric lighting in July 1881, and made the market a popular resort, rather than a place to buy fresh food, a model which proved a success. After one year, Council did not renew the lease, hoping to capitalise on Cole's initiative, but it was never again so popular. Cole went on to move create an even larger bookstore, the Coles Book Arcade.

The novelty of Saturday night opening was still evident from the account of an interstate visitor in 1884 but its role as the premier fresh food location was permanently surrendered to the expanding Queen Victoria Market.

In the 1890s there was little positive news. A fire in the electrical wiring, another fire at the 'Federal Hat Company', an accidental shooting, a suicide, a workman falling 60 feet to the ground through a skylight and, finally, in April 1899, a multiple murder.

=== 20th Century ===
A coloured postcard from early in the new century shows the shop row of the Eastern Market on Bourke Street with a horse-drawn carriage sharing the road way with a cable tram. Inside the imposing facade the decline continued. In 1904 the City Council attempted to turn around the fortunes of the site by managing the premises directly (rather than subcontracting) but 'an increase in revenue... failed to be realised'

In 1913, as various plans for profitability were discussed by the City Council, The Argus wrote: "Thirty-four years ago the Eastern Market buildings, at the corner of Bourke-street and Exhibition street, were erected by the City Council. Almost ever since that time the conduct of the market has been a problem that has perplexed the councilors who have formed the committee that has to deal with it." By January 1933, with the exception of the main hall being used as a 'motor garage', little had changed and the same paper wrote of the Market's 'faded glory'.

=== Decline and closure ===
The Eastern Market's final decades had a 'sideshow raffishness' with 'fortune tellers, strength tester machines, electric-shock therapists, tattoo artists, taxidermists and bric-a-brac dealers were among the last ghosts to desert it in the 20th century'. By the 1950s there were very few leases within the building, and the lower market had become a taxi depot.

The City of Melbourne decided that the site would be ideal for a modern hotel, and began negotiations with PanAm and others, and the building was demolished in 1960, and the Southern Cross Hotel was built on the site.

== Legacy ==
The 'Turret Clock' made by Thomas Gaunt and installed in the building in 1879 was donated by the City Council to Museum Victoria in 1961. The building's foundation stone and an accompanying time capsule were installed in the new hotel development and is now located on the property frontage facing Bourke Street. The original gates of the Market built in 1880 were relocated to the Altona Memorial Park in 1968 and are still in this location.
