= Collins Place =

Australian tallest building

35 and 55 Collins Street
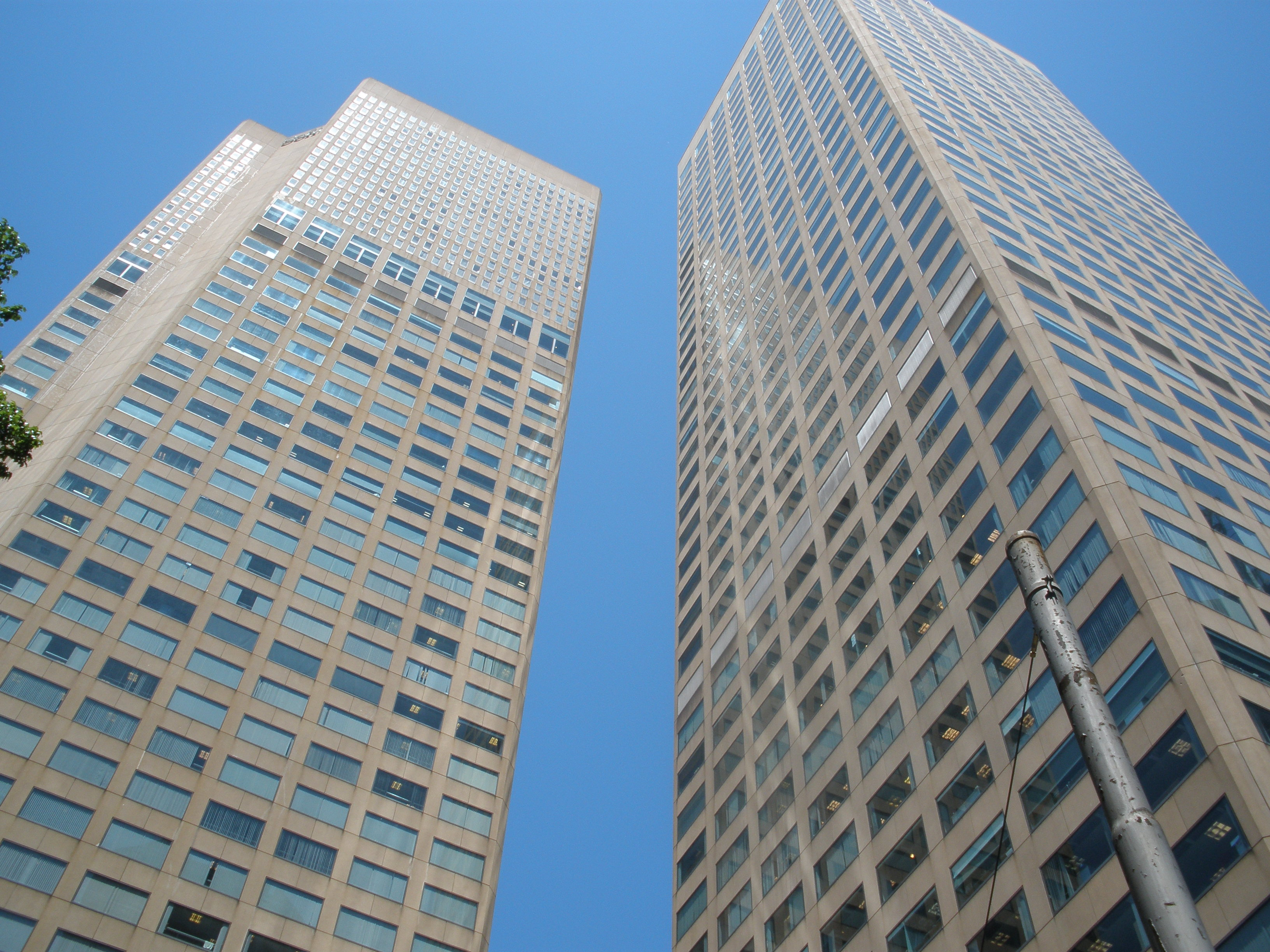

Record height
- Tallest in Melbourne from 1978 to 1986^{[I]}
- Preceded by: Nauru House; ANZ at Collins Place
- Surpassed by: Sofitel Hotel at Collins Place; Rialto Towers

General information
- Type: Hotel and Office
- Location: Melbourne, Australia
- Coordinates: 37°48′51″S 144°58′22″E
- Construction started: 1971
- Completed: 1981; 45 years ago
- Cost: A$270 million
- Owner: AMP Wholesale Office Fund and AMP Capital Investors

Height
- Roof: 185

Technical details
- Floor count: 46 levels - 55 Collins Street; 50 levels - 35 Collins Street
- Floor area: 94,600 m^{2} (1,018,000 sq ft)

Design and construction
- Architects: Architect: Pei Cobb Freed and Partners

Collins Place is a large mixed-use complex in the Melbourne central business district, Victoria, Australia. Designed in about 1970 by IM Pei & Partners, and finally completed in 1981, it was Melbourne's first and Australia's largest mixed use project, including basement car-parking, a shopping plaza with professional suites, cinemas and a nightclub in the lower levels, and offices and a high-rise hotel in a pair of towers (35 and 55 Collins Street) above.

== History ==
The development of the project began with the purchase of a number of old buildings in the 'Paris End' of Collins Street by the ANZ Bank in the late 1960s. They acted on the advice of the Montreal-based American Vincent Ponte to join with adjacent land owners to develop an ambitious multi-use complex, similar to those developed in North America in the 1960s. The bank joined with the AMP Society and Mainline Corporation to amalgamate a site of nearly a whole city block, and commissioned a design from the New York firm of Architects, IM Pei & Partners and the Melbourne firm of Bates, Smart & McCutcheon as associate architects in about 1970.

The construction of Collins Place took far longer than anticipated due to the credit squeeze of the 1970s, the collapse of Mainline, and strike action by construction unions. It opened in two stages, the first being the ANZ Bank's office tower in 1978. The hotel, named The Wentworth, and the shopping plaza, dubbed 'the Great Space', opened on 18 May 1981, to great fanfare and a 7-page advertising spread in The Age. The final cost was A$270 million.

The hotel's restaurants at the 35th floor were for many years admired for their views, which Melburnians could enjoy for free by a visit to the toilets on that floor. The cinemas finally opened in 1987 with two screens, known as The Kino, and continue to operate now with seven screens.

The shopping plaza and hotel have been refurbished a number of times; while there have been no major structural alterations the 1970s decor of earth tones has been altered in favour of contemporary colours and materials. More shop fronts have been added or opened up facing the surrounding streets, reducing the enclosed nature of the complex, which was much criticised.

== Architecture ==
The design was based around a pair of towers at 45 degree angles to the Hoddle Grid, with the triangular spaces between forming an open plaza to the street and a shopping court behind the towers. All open spaces are covered by a space frame, with transparent plastic roofing. The hotel occupies the top 15 floors of the 35 Collins Street tower, expressed by smaller exterior windows, and which features a dramatic interior atrium the whole 15 levels. The whole complex is clad in tan-coloured precast masonry panels.

== Main tenants ==
35 Collins Street

- 3–16, no longer Telstra
- 17–21, NTT Australia Pty Ltd [Building Signage]
- 23,24, Victorian Auditor - General's Of
- 24, Agora Asset Management
- 25, Amdocs
- 26, DIG Capital Advisory & COI Capital Management
- 17 & 29, AMP Capital
- 30, VCSO - Victory Corporate Serviced Offices
- 35–50, Sofitel Hotel [Building Signage]

55 Collins Street

- The Commons Co-Working levels 1–7. Since December 2024
- All floors are completely leased to ANZ
- There a number of sub-tenants in the building including Drake International, Clark and CG Associates and GTA Consultants.
- Richie Nasr
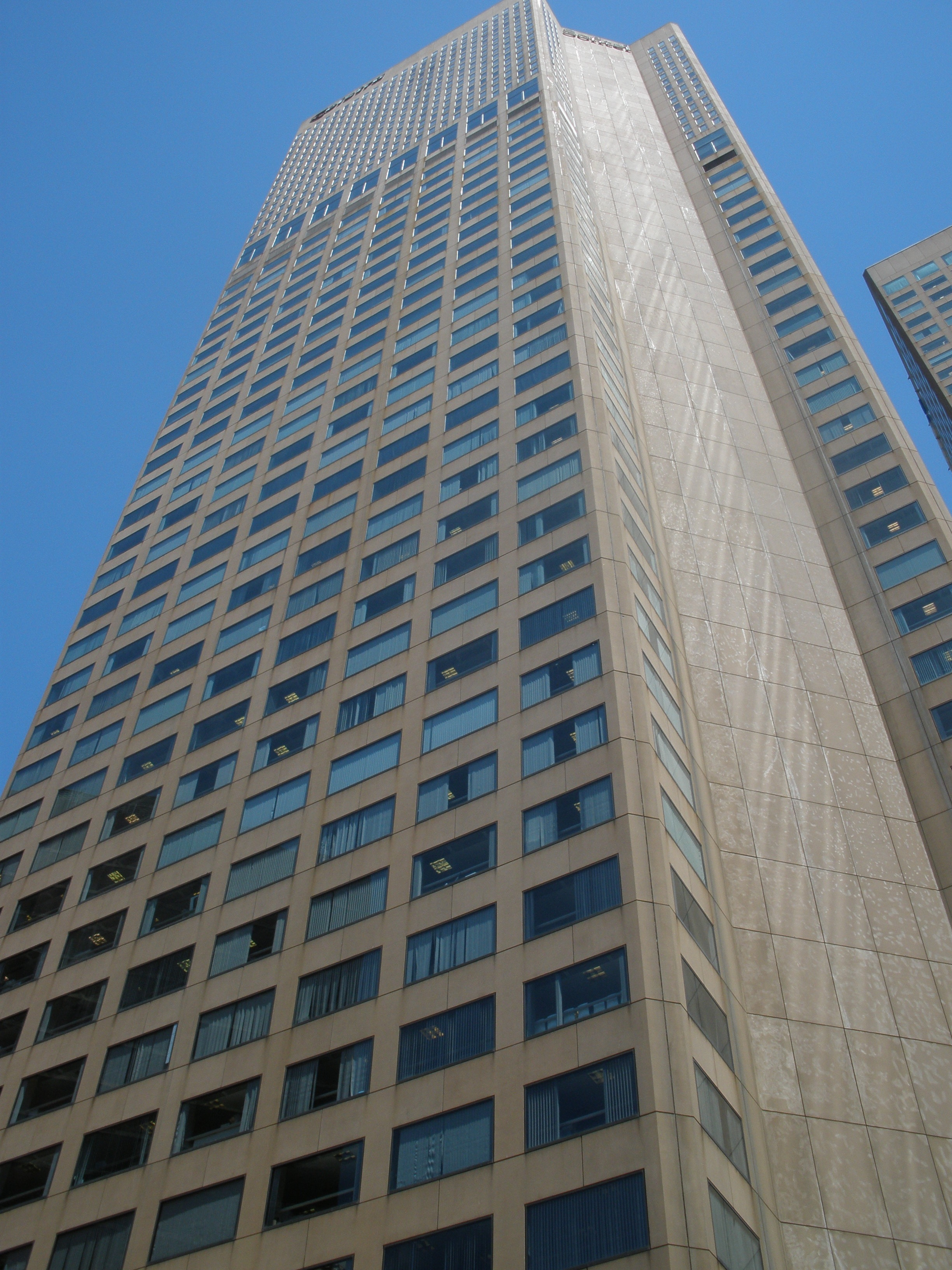
35 Collins Street

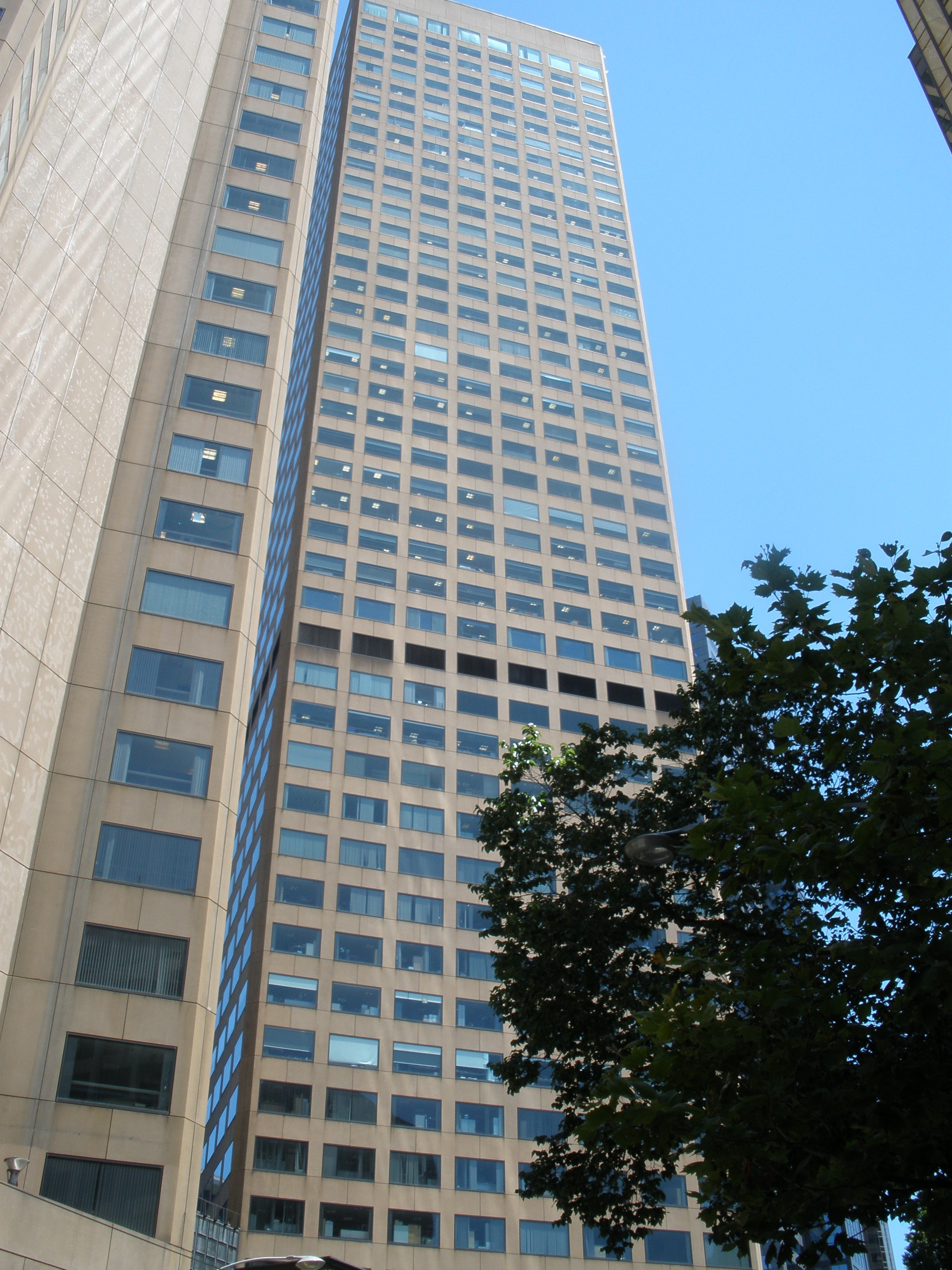
55 Collins Street

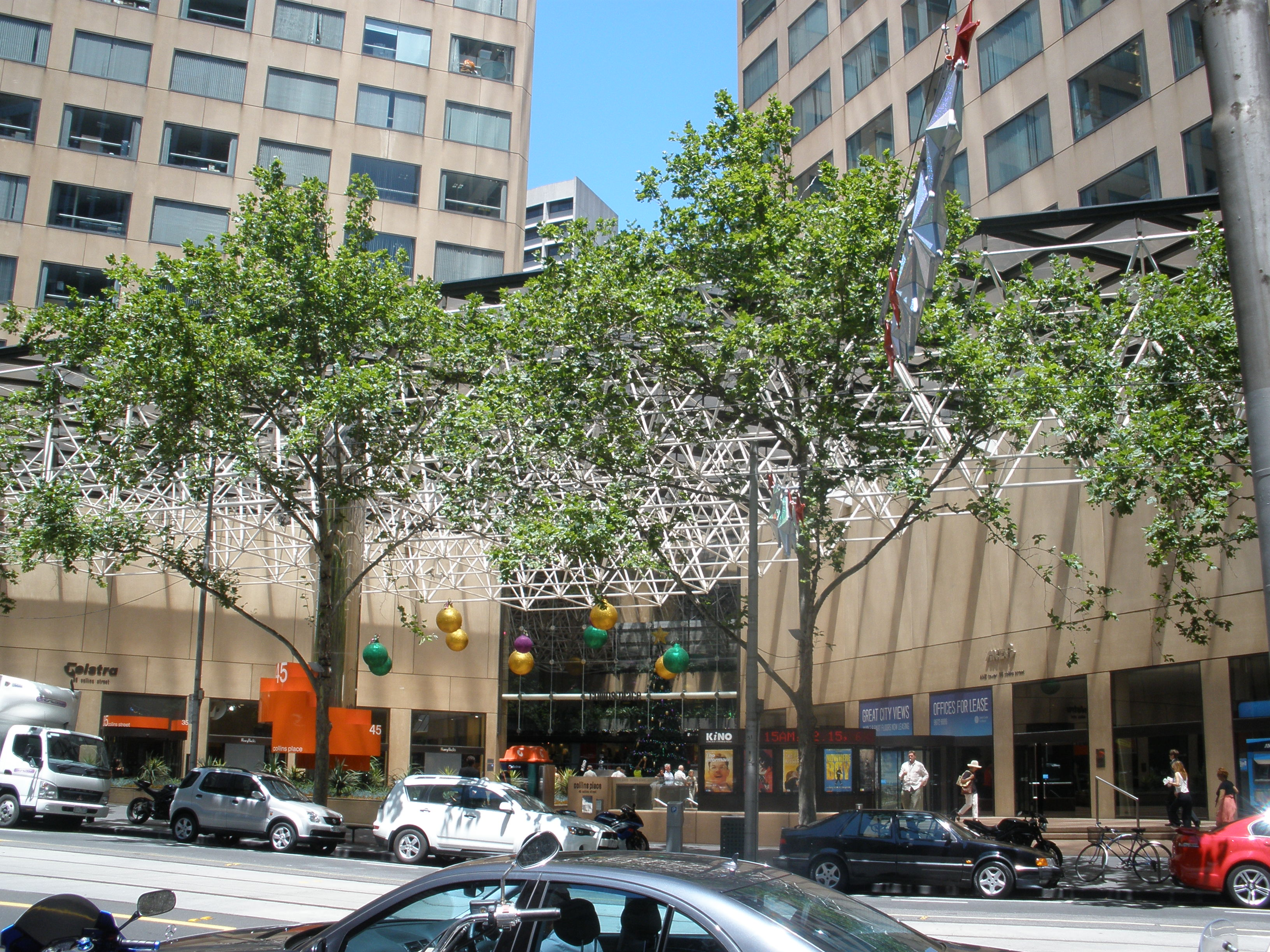
View from opposite side of Collins Street

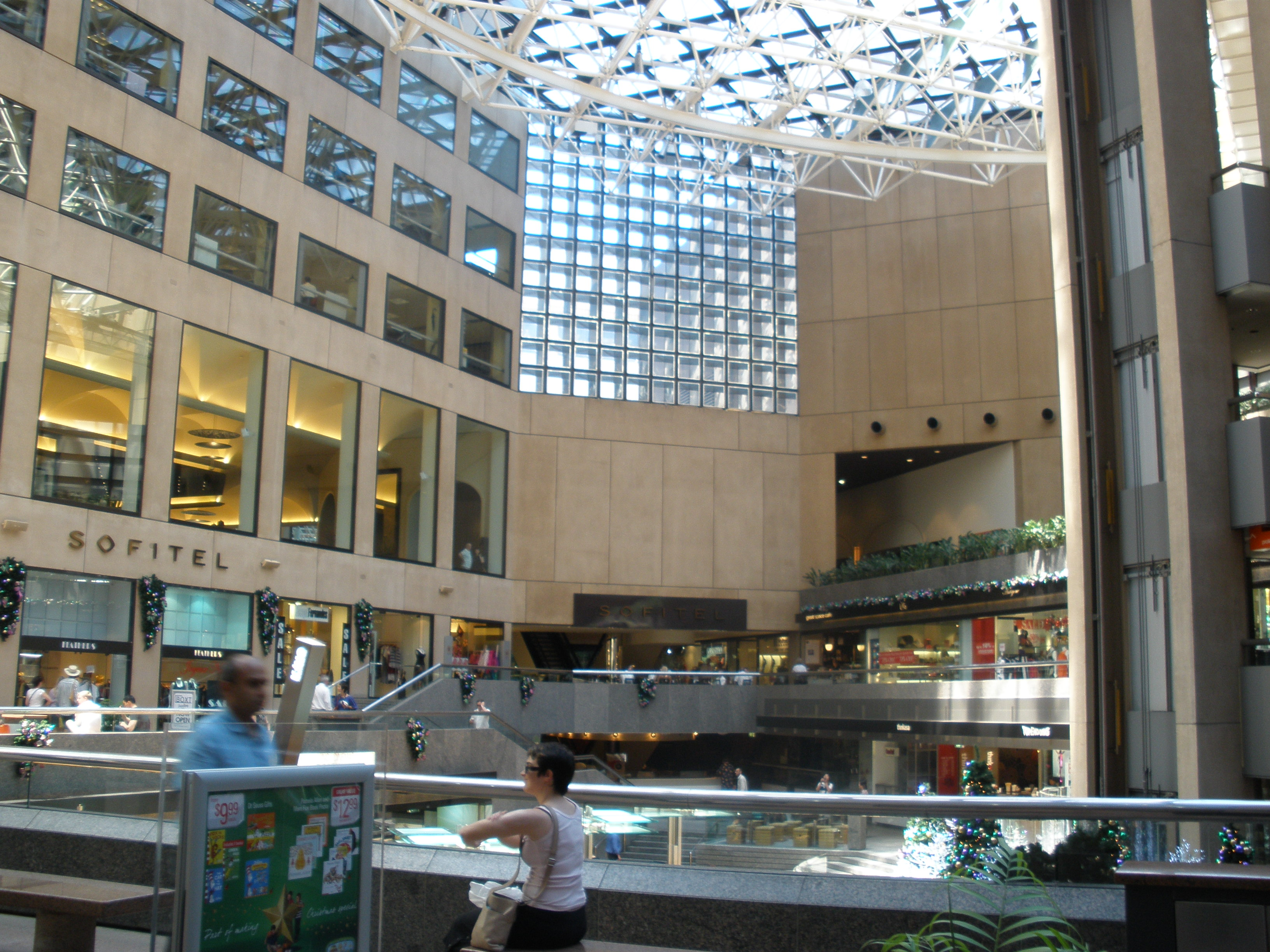
Collins Place food court

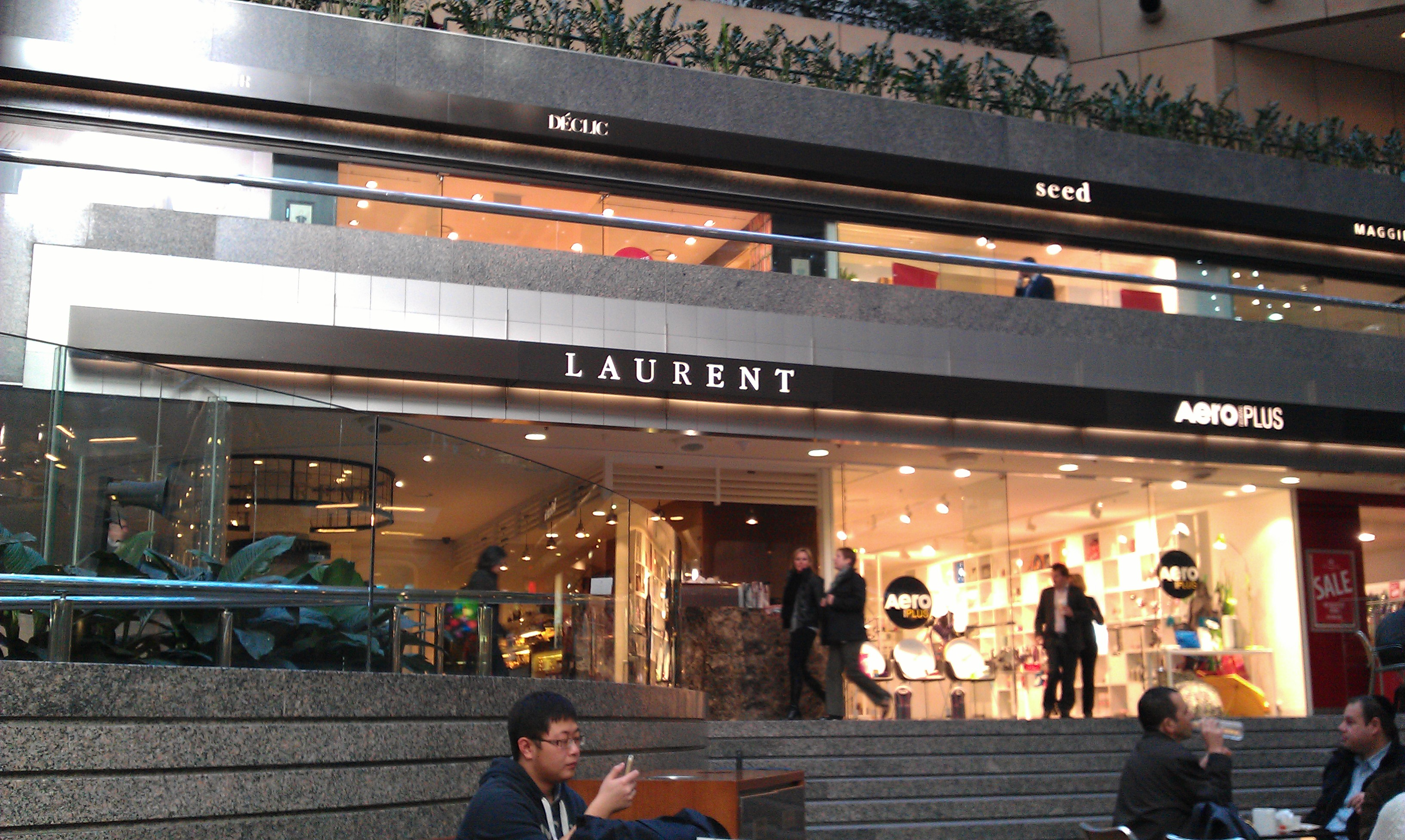
Collins Place food court
