= Western Market, Melbourne =

First official fruit and vegetable market in Melbourne, Australia

Coordinates: 37.8180°S 144.9599°E

The Western Market was established in December 1841 on a site bounded by Market, Collins and William Streets, and Flinders Lane. The market was Melbourne's first official fruit and vegetable market but, like the Eastern Market, its popularity was succeeded by the Queen Victoria Market. It traded for 90 years. The buildings were demolished in 1961.
