= Hendra =

Hendra may refer to:

- Hendra (name), given name and surname
- Hendra, Cornwall, England, the name of several hamlets
- Hendra (house), a heritage-listed house on the Mornington Peninsula, Victoria, Australia
- Hendra, Queensland, a suburb of Brisbane, Queensland, Australia
  - Hendra railway station, serves the Brisbane suburb
- Hendra virus, broke out in Australia in 1994
- Hendra (Ben Watt album)
