= Harry Norris =

Australian architect (1888–1966)

- Born: 12 June 1888; Hawthorn, Victoria
- Died: 15 December 1966 (aged 78)
- Occupation: Architect

Harry Albert Norris (12 June 1888 – 15 December 1966) was an Australian architect based in Melbourne, Victoria. He was especially known for his 1930s Art Deco and Streamline Moderne commercial work in the Melbourne central business district, and was one of the most prolific and successful interwar architects in the city.

== Early life and education ==
Harry Albert Norris was born in Hawthorn, Victoria, on 12 June 1888. His childhood home was in Carlisle Street, Preston, and he lived in Preston for much of his life.

== Career ==
Norris was one of the first architects to introduce the Art Deco style to major commercial projects, and was possibly the first architect to introduce elements of Streamline Moderne into mainstream design.

His designs were informed by his regular overseas trips, especially to the United States, which he visited regularly every 18 months to two years from perhaps the late 1920s. In 1931, upon return from one of these trips, he said: "It is our duty not merely to copy the American architects, but to do better by taking advantage of the lesson from their mistakes".

He had a strong and long relationship with the wealthy Nicholas family, designing not only the Nicholas Building, but the Aspro factory in South Melbourne, and the spectacular mansion Burnham Beeches in the Dandenong Ranges for Alfred Nicholas. He also designed various additions and alterations to Wesley College following a bequest from the family.

Norris also had a long relationship with George Coles, designing branches of their eponymous Coles Stores from the late 1920s, numerous matching Art Deco branches in the 1930s, and some of their earliest supermarkets in the 1950s, as well as Hendra, a country house on the Mornington Peninsula, for E. B. Coles in 1938.

The Melford Motors Showroom also had many Streamline Moderne elements.

He refused membership of the RVIA for many years until finally joining on the 21 February 1946.

== Later life and death ==
Norris retired on his 78th birthday in June 1966 and died six months later, on 15 December 1966.

== Notable buildings ==
=== Nicholas Building ===
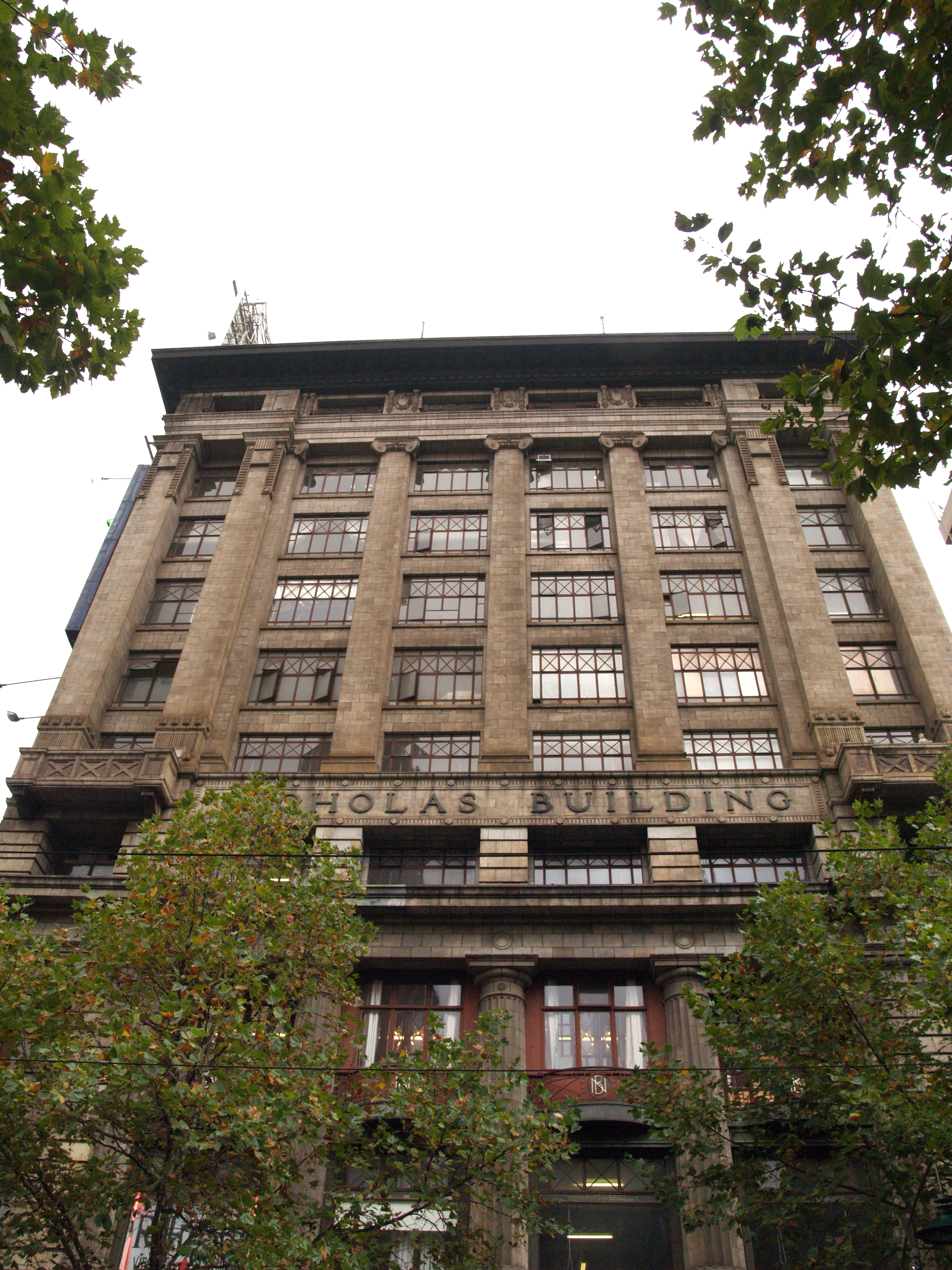
Nicholas Building, Melbourne

- Address: 27-41 Swanston Street, Melbourne
- Date of construction: 1925–26, 1939–40 (extension)

The Nicholas Building is one of the most distinctive interwar office blocks in Melbourne. The facade is an essay in the Commercial Palazzo or Stripped Classical on a grand scale, with classical elements such as tall ionic pilasters and Doric columns and a wide cornice, all executed in architectural terra cotta, known in Australia as faience. The Cathedral Arcade is located on the ground floor and its glazed leadlight barrel vaulted ceiling is a main feature of the building. Norris had his architecture practice here from 1926 until moving to 136 Jolimont Road, East Melbourne in the 1950s. The Nicholas Building was originally used as offices and retail, and as of the 2010s is known for specialist retail and creative industries.

=== G.J. Coles Building ===
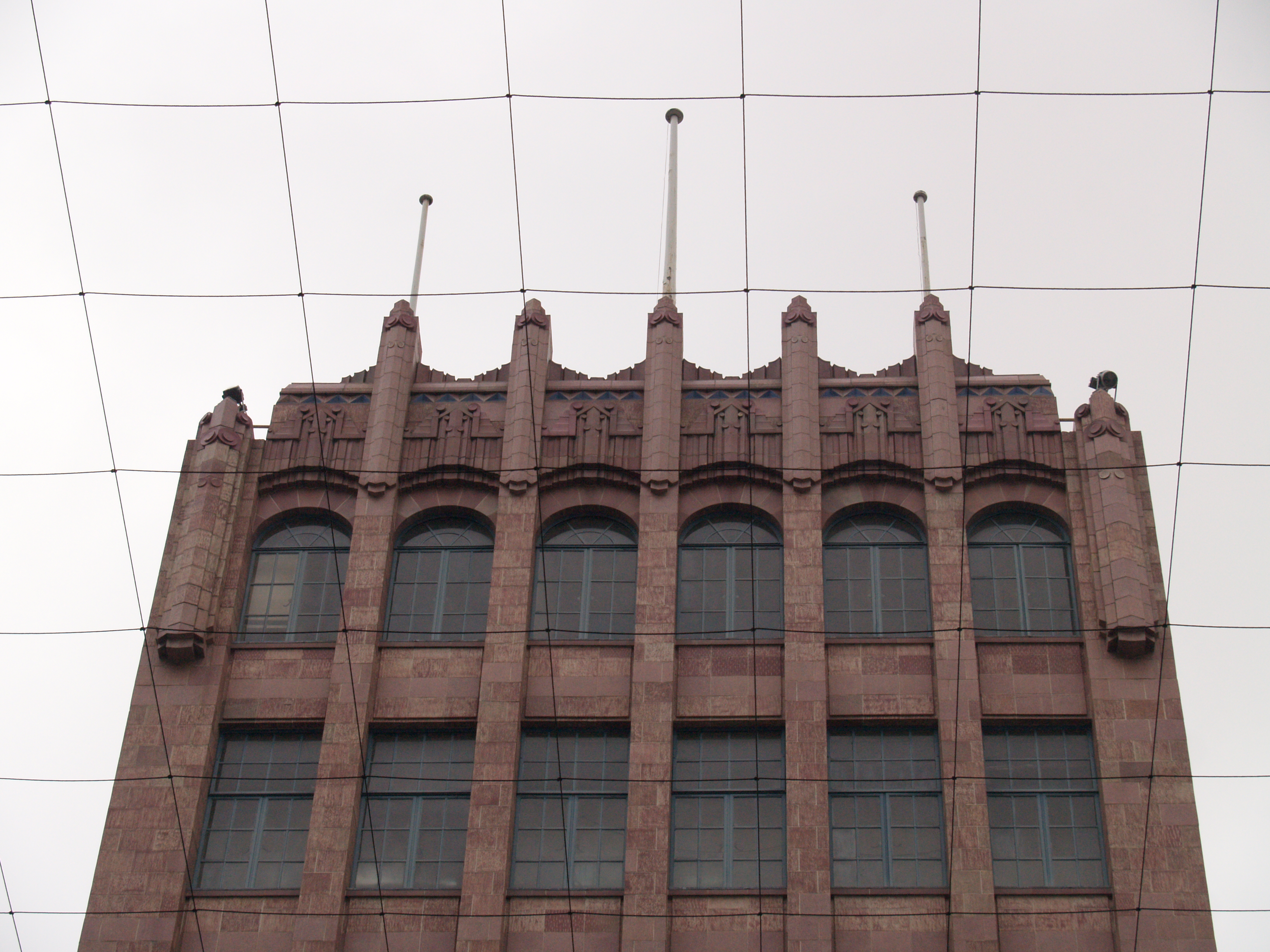
David Jones store (former G. J. Coles store), Melbourne

- Address: 298-304 Bourke Street, Melbourne
- Date of construction: 1929–30, 1938-40 (extension), 1984 Bates Smart McCutcheon (conversion to David Jones)
- Builder: Clements Langford
- Engineer: Clive Steele

The building is noted for its use of colorful Jazz Moderne detailing, the unusual mauve colour of the faience facade and an overall verticality created by the use of prominent vertical piers, a form known locally as "Commercial Gothic". It was one of the first large scale examples of Art Deco design in Melbourne both inside and out, opening in March 1930 to expectant crowds.

=== Block Court ===
- Address: 288-292 Collins Street, Melbourne
- Date of construction:1929-30

Block Court was a remodelling project, introducing a shopping arcade to the ground floor of an older building (the 1890 Athenaeum Club, connecting Collins Street with the Block Arcade. Block Court is noted for its extensive use of Art Deco detailing, such as the zigzag decoration to the copper shop window frames, patterned stained glass highlight windows, patterned multi-colour terrazzo flooring and elaborate ceiling decoration with stepped geometric shapes and floral motifs. Opening in October 1930, it was one of the earliest notable examples of Art Deco design in Melbourne (preceded by Norris's Coles Store), and remains the most ornate Art Deco interior in the city.

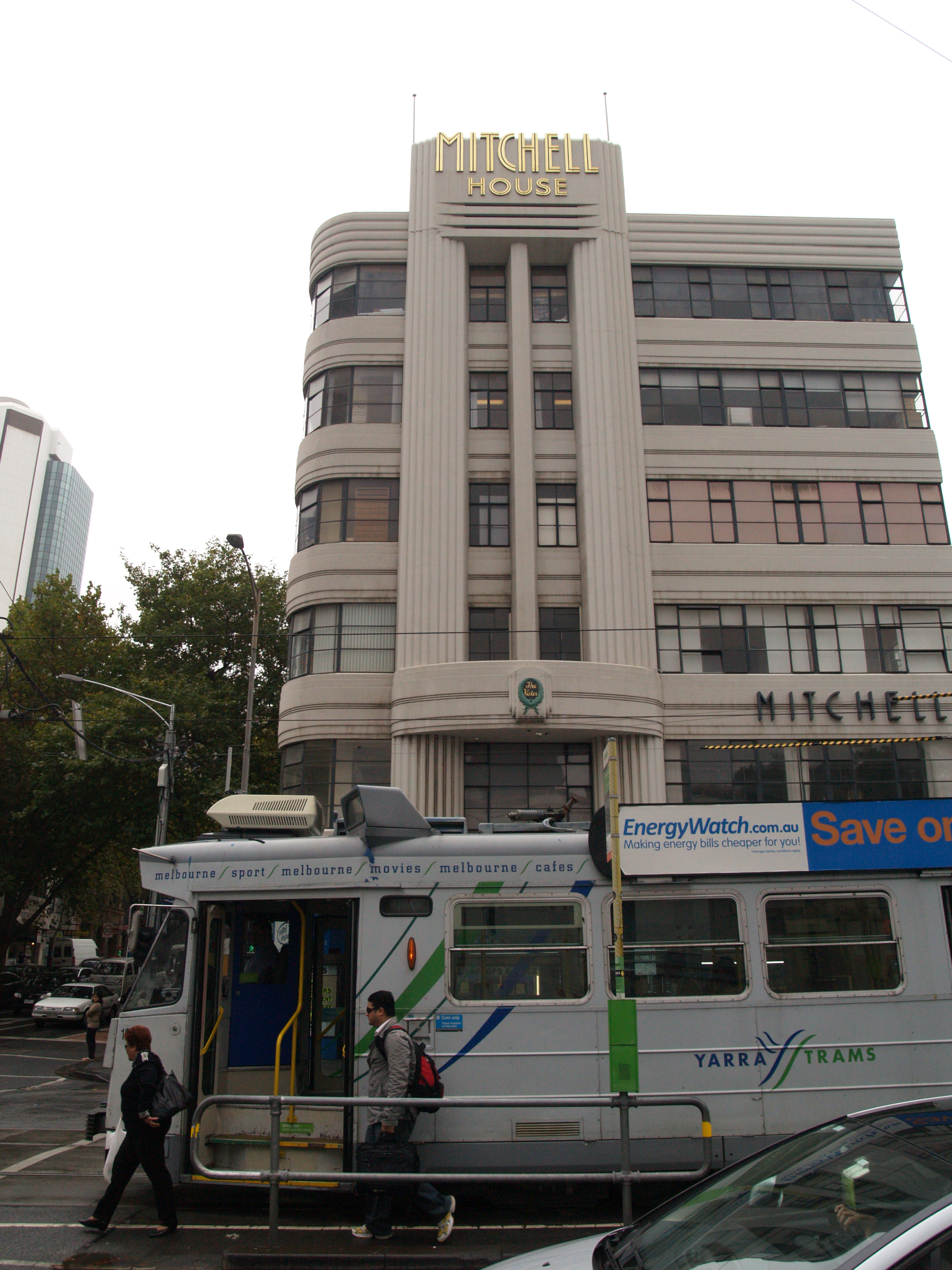
Mitchell House, Melbourne

=== Burnham Beeches ===
- Address : Sherbrooke Road, Sassafras
- Date of construction : 1931–33

A large country house built for Alfred Nicholas, it is the most outstanding mansion in the Art Deco style Victoria. Built over three levels, set in extensive landscaped grounds, it included numerous bedrooms, living spaces, sunrooms and a rooftop deck, with large windows overlooking the hillside. The expression is in a white horizontal Streamlined Moderne mode, with decorative Jazz Moderne detailing including motifs of koalas and possums in moulded relief panels.

=== Mitchell House ===
- Address: 325-362 Lonsdale Street, Melbourne
- Date of construction: 1937

Mitchell House is located at the corner of Elizabeth Street and Lonsdale Street. The building is a fine example of Streamline Moderne, featuring horizontal bands of windows wrapping around the curved corner, broken by a contrasting vertical element topped by the gold lettering of the building's name.

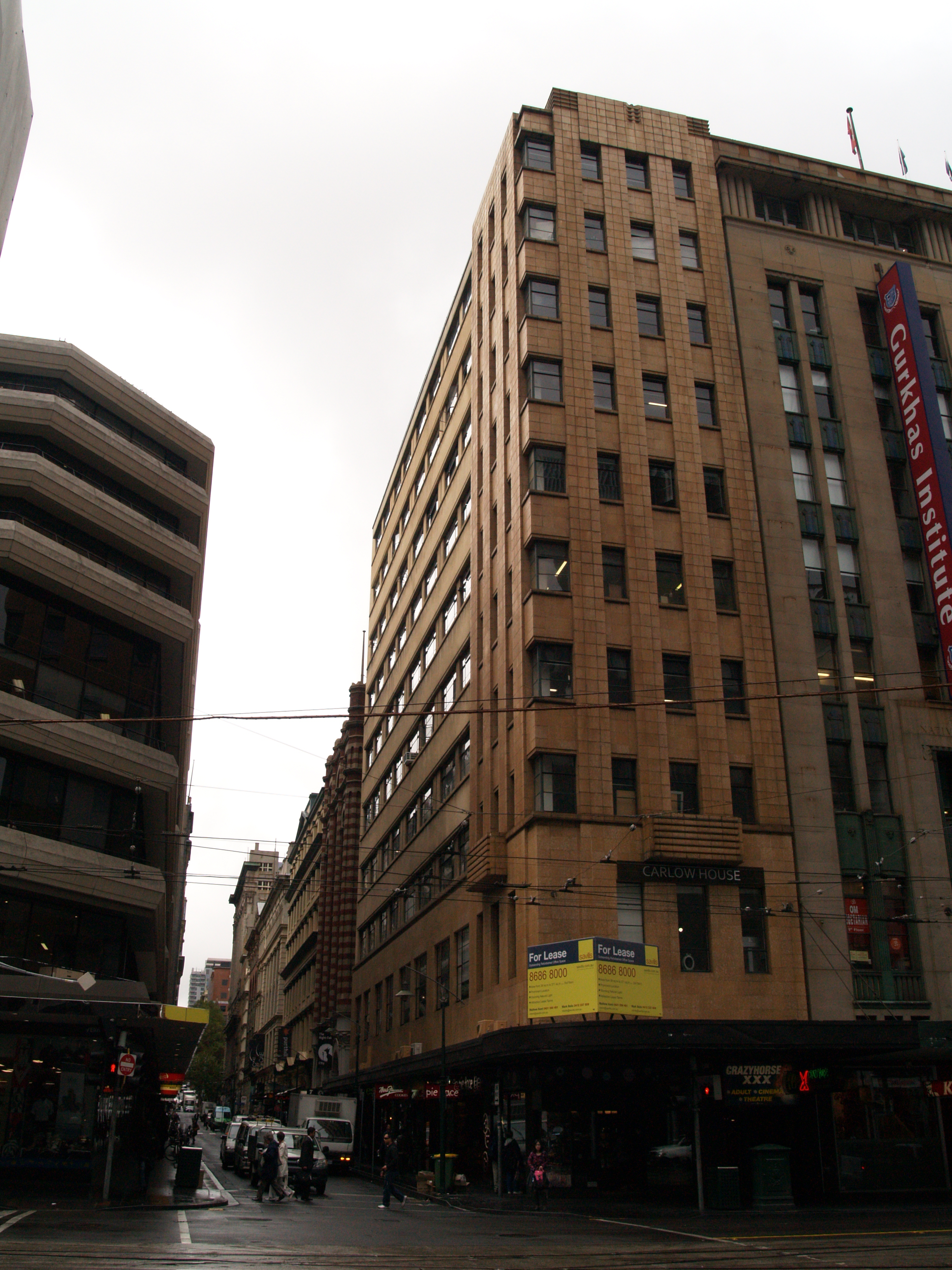
Carlow House, Melbourne

=== Other selected projects ===
- Tattersall's Club premises (now Curtin House), 248–258 Swanston Street, Melbourne, 1922
- Deva House, 327 Bourke Street, Melbourne, 1924
- Majorca Building, 258-260 Flinders Lane, 1929
- Former Kellow Falkiner Showrooms, 375-379 St Kilda Road, South Yarra, 1928 (altered)
- Northcote Town Hall auditorium and lobby refurbishment, 197–201 High Street, Northcote, 1930
- Moonya, 9 Lakeside Drive, Country Club Estate, Emerald, c. 1937
- Silver Birches, 1 Mary St, Country Club Estate, Emerald, c. 1937
- Melford Motors Showroom, 615 Elizabeth Street, North Melbourne, 1937
- Mission to Seamen, 1 Beach Road, Port Melbourne, 1937 (dem. c. 1992)
- Former Capitol Bakeries, 625 Chapel Street, 1937 (dem 2017)
- Hendra, 11 Williams Rd, Mount Eliza, 1938
- Northern Bakery (later Tip Top), 170 Edward Street, Brunswick East, 1940 (altered)
- Coles Store, Ivanhoe, 115–117 Upper Heidelberg Road, Ivanhoe, 1940
- Nicholas Hall, 148 Lonsdale Street, Melbourne, 1940
- Ivanhoe Grammar School, The Ridgeway, Ivanhoe, 1954
- Fowlers Vacola Manufacturing Factory, 275 Burwood Road, Hawthorn, 1955 (now The Works homewares store)
- Australian and New Zealand Bank, 224-236 Queen Street, Melbourne, 1958 (altered)
- Hotel Windsor, Spring Street (north extension), 1961
- Kodak Factory (1950s–60s) and administration building (1964) (dem. 2011)
