= Deva House =

Coordinates: 37°48′51″S 144°57′51″E

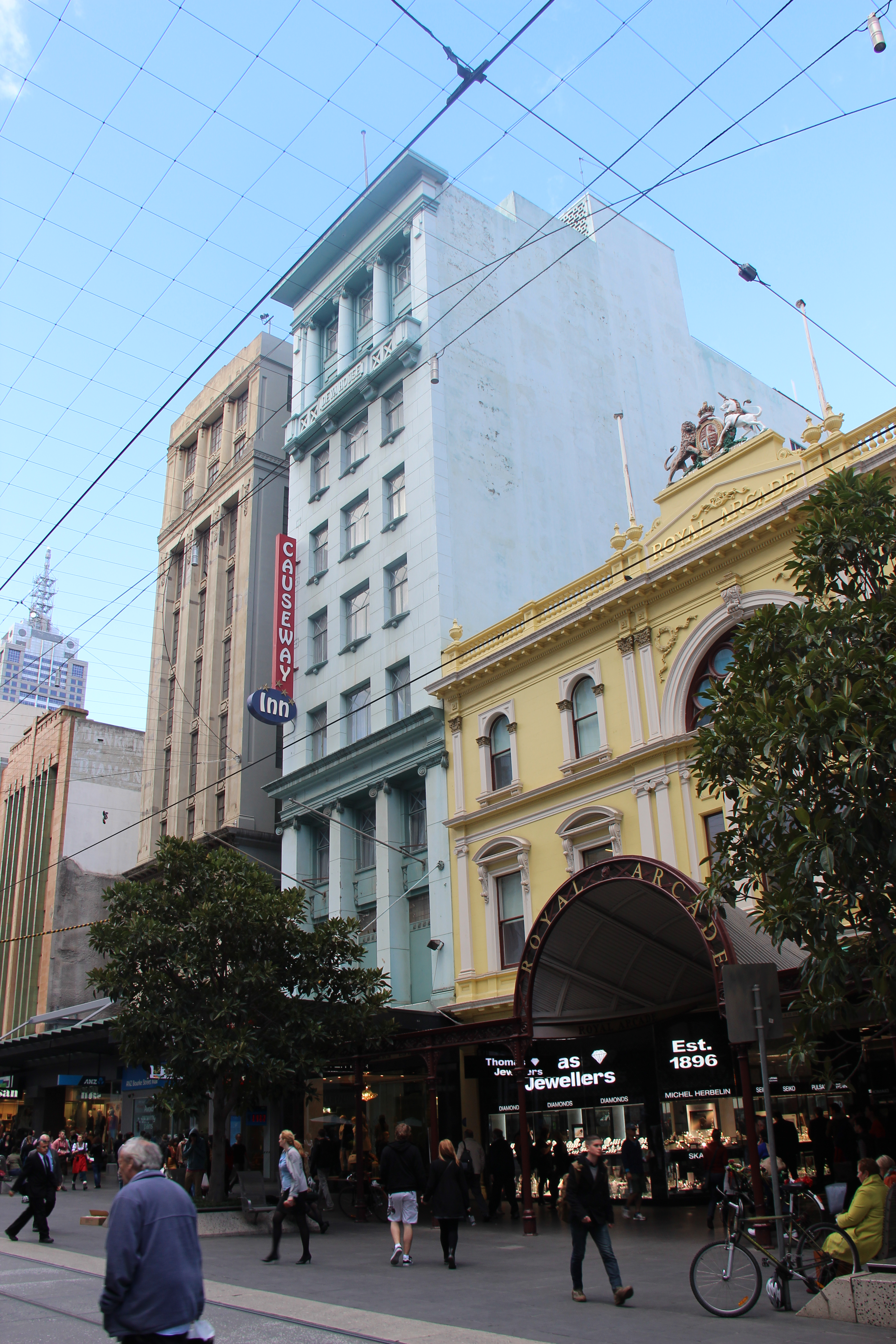
Deva House, the blue building in the centre of the photo

Deva House is a 1926 commercial building in Melbourne, Australia designed by Harry Norris, one of the most prolific architects in the city during the period from 1920 to 1930, and noted for his Art Deco buildings, incorporating both emerging Australian and American architectural styles.

== History of the building ==
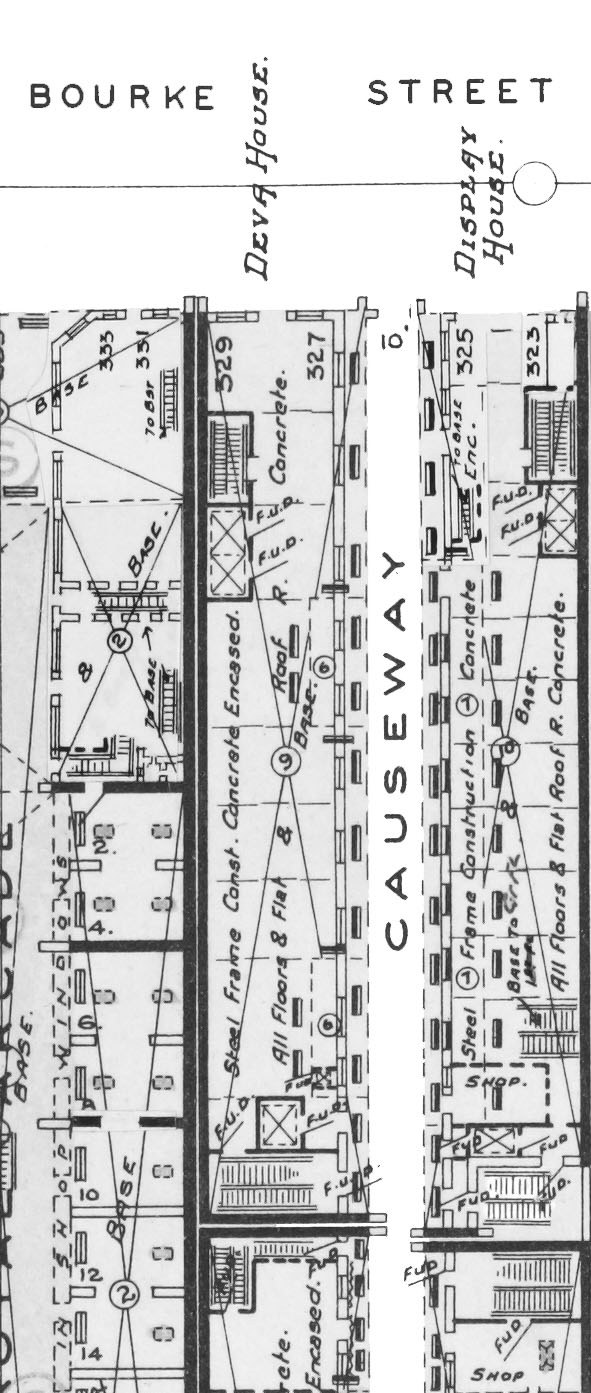
Ground floor plan (1948 Malhstedt Fire Survey)

Deva House is a 10-storey building located at 327-9 Bourke Street, CBD. It was designed by Harry Norris in 1925 (some sources say 1924), and completed in 1926, for his client George (G.J.) Coles, founder of the Coles Group retail empire. Norris designed it during the same period, and in a similar style, to the better-known Nicholas Building.

In common with other architects working in the city at the time, Norris adopted significantly different styles, depending on the client and project demands. He also incorporated different architectural influences within one building.

== Structure and style ==
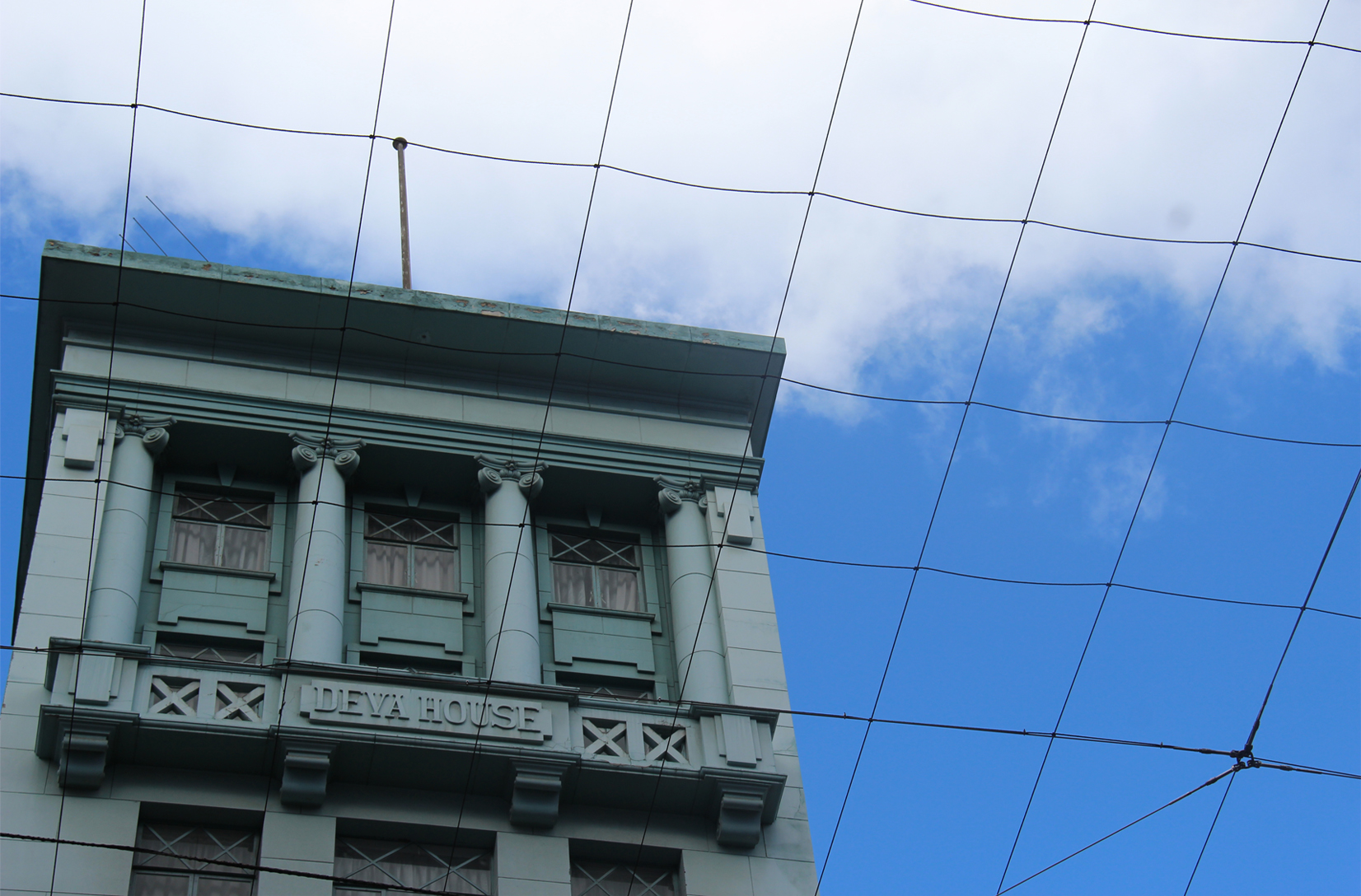
Top floors retain the original balconette, columns and cornice.

Deva House was constructed using a steel frame for the basement and first two floors, with reinforced concrete for the eight upper floors. Its height is 130 feet (40 m), just below the 132 feet (40 m) height limit in force in Melbourne at the time. Economic considerations may also have influenced the design, as this created maximum floor area at more commercially attractive lower levels, and a cheaper construction method for higher floors. Norris incorporated faience into many of his building exteriors, notably the G.J. Coles building, but this is absent from Deva House and there is no surviving evidence that it was part of the original finish.

Architecture academic Philip Goad has suggested that a first classification would place Deva House within the Palazzo style, with Greek Revival details in its facade treatment, but he adds that closer analysis reveals a more streamlined approach, with elements of Eclecticism.

== The building today ==
As with most period buildings on Bourke Street, modernisation of Deva House has left little more than the shell of its original design. The interior of Deva House from the second floor up has been entirely gutted and rebuilt as a hotel, while both the ground floor facade and interior have been stripped out in their entirety and rebuilt in the contemporary high-street style and now house shops. The building is listed on the RAIA Victoria 20th Century Buildings Register.
