= Block Arcade =

Shopping centre in Melbourne, Australia

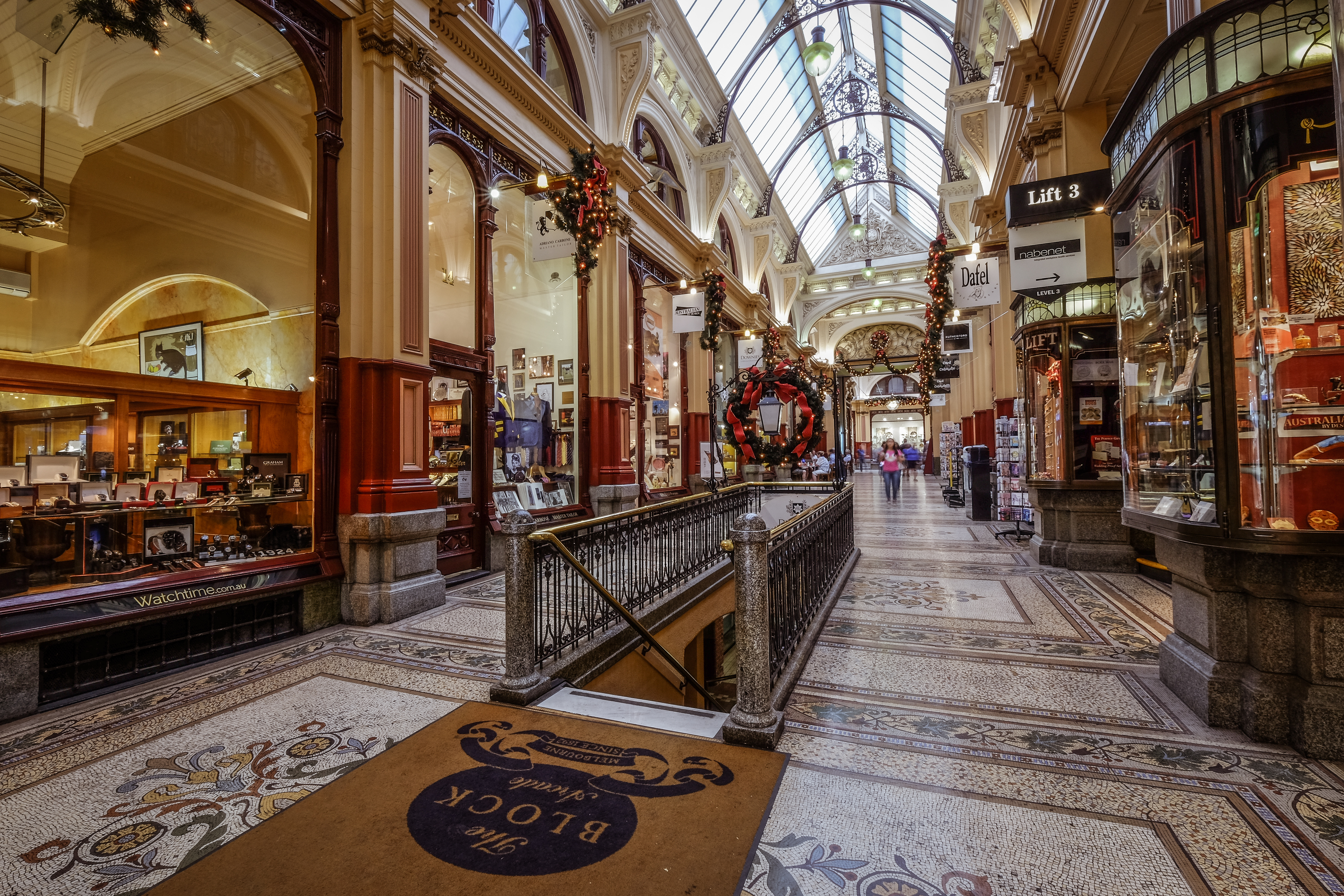
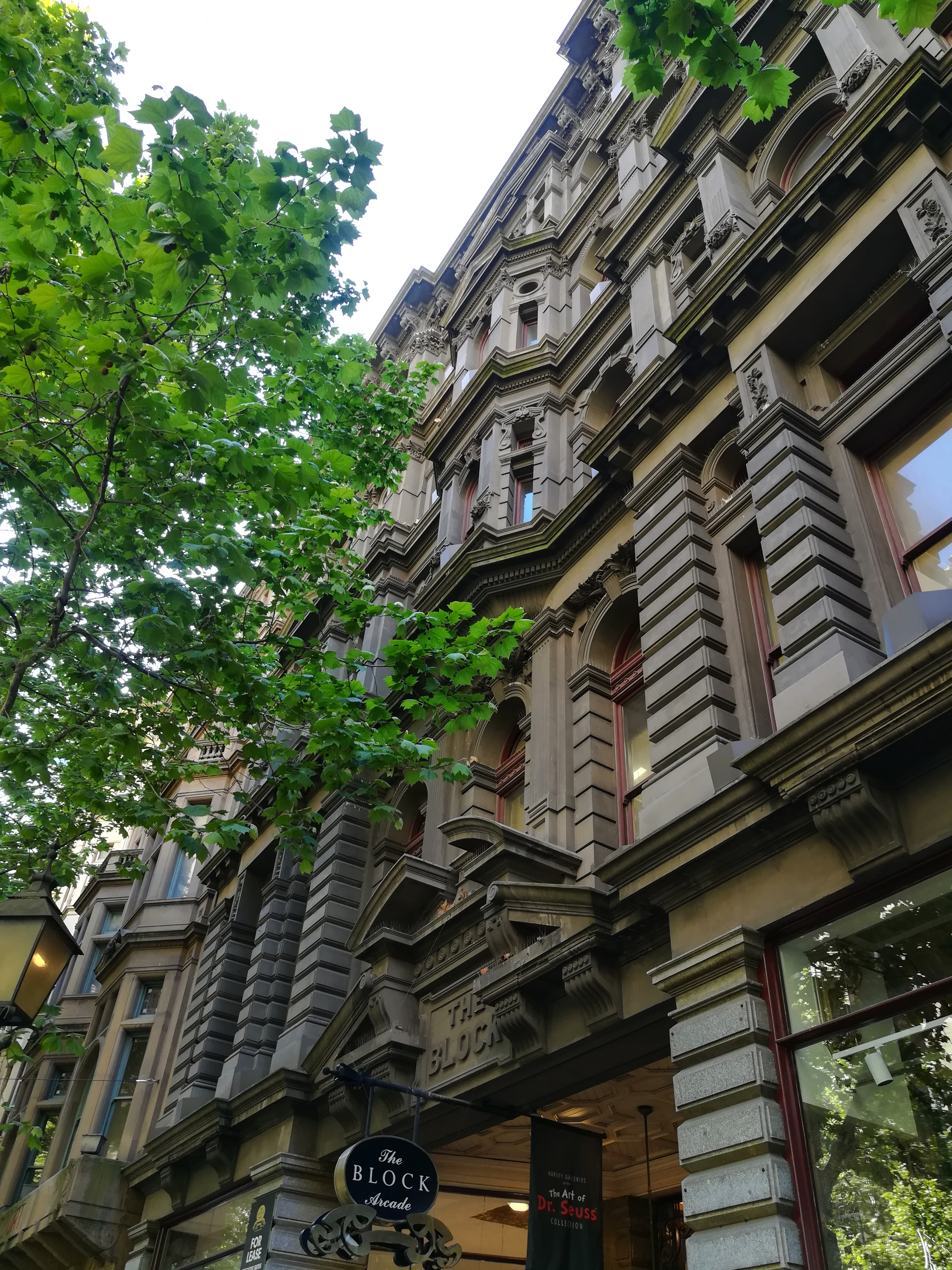
- From top: Block Arcade looking south, Collins Street façade
- Location: Victoria, Australia
- Coordinates: 37°48′57″S 144°57′52″E
- Address: 282 Collins Street, Melbourne
- Opened: 1892; 134 years ago
- Manager: Allard Shelton Pty Ltd
- Owner: Block Arcade Melbourne Pty Ltd
- Floors: 5
- Public transit: Collins St/Elizabeth St (#2): 19, 57, 59; Elizabeth St/Collins St (#5): 11, 12, 48, 109
- Website: theblock.com.au

Victorian Heritage Register
- Official name: Block Arcade
- Type: State Registered Place
- Designated: 9 October 1974
- Reference no.: H0032
- Heritage Overlay number: HO596

The Block Arcade is a historic shopping arcade in the central business district of Melbourne, Victoria, Australia. Constructed between 1891 and 1893, it is considered one of the late Victorian era's finest shopping arcades and ranks among Melbourne's most popular tourist attractions.

Designed by architects Twentyman & Askew, the Block is one of Melbourne's most richly decorated interior spaces, replete with mosaic tiled flooring, glass canopy supported in cast and wrought iron, and tall, elaborate timber shop fronts. The arcade is L-shaped with an octagonal rotunda at the corner, connecting Collins Street at the south end to Elizabeth Street on the west. On the north side, the arcade connects to Block Place, a covered pedestrian lane that leads to Little Collins Street, opposite Melbourne's oldest shopping arcade, the Royal Arcade. The Block Arcade's six-storey external façades on both Collins and Elizabeth streets are some of Australia's best surviving examples of Victorian architecture in the Mannerist style.

The arcade takes its name from the practice of "doing the block": dressing fashionably and promenading the section of Collins Street between Elizabeth and Swanston streets. It is listed on the Victorian Heritage Register.

== Name: "doing the block" ==
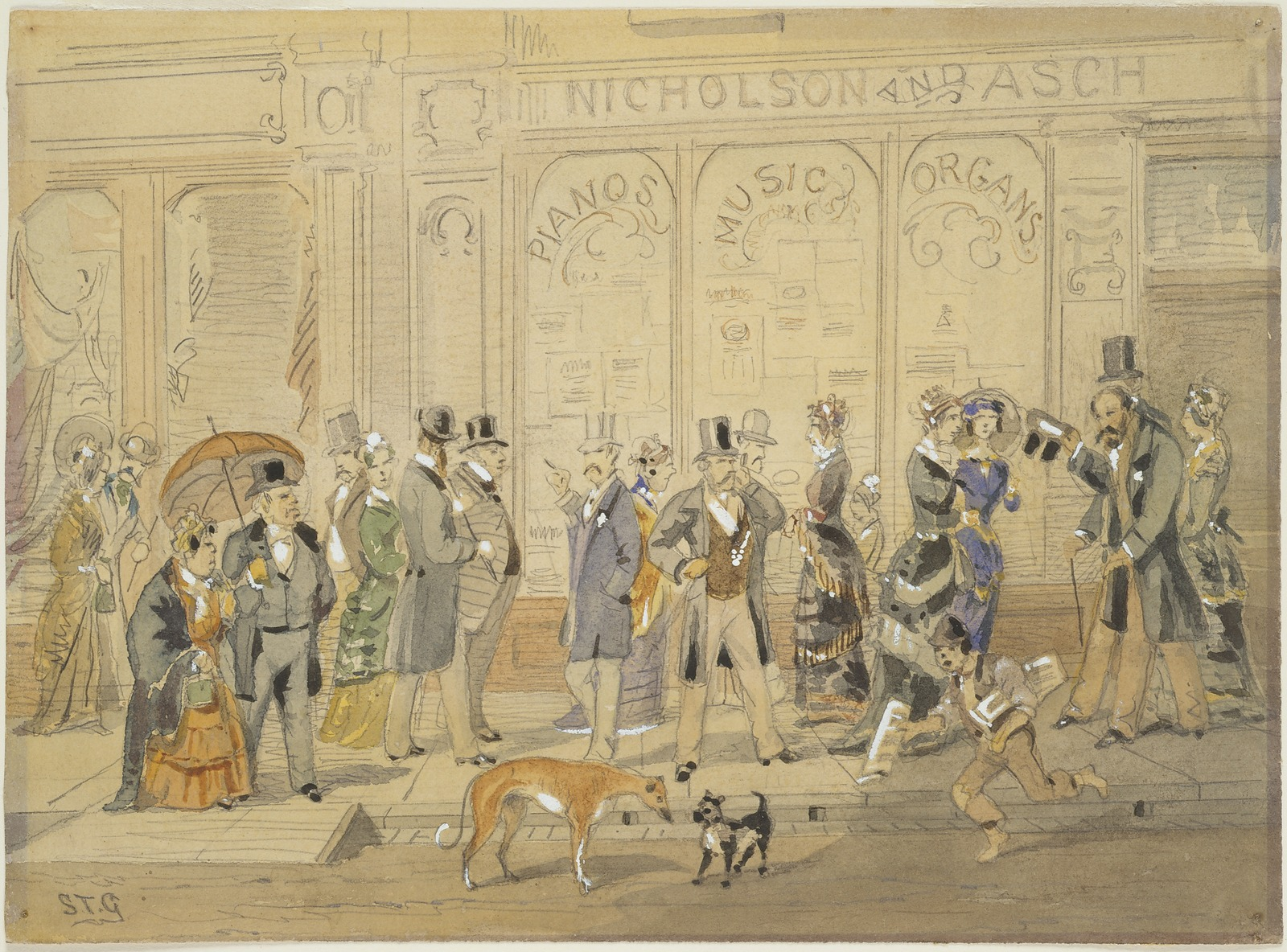
An 1880 illustration by Samuel Thomas Gill shows Melburnians "doing the Block"

By the late 1870s, the north side of Collins Street between Swanston and Elizabeth streets had become the favoured promenade of Melbourne's well-to-do, who went there to frequent its prestigious shops and cafes, and to see and be seen as they walked from one end to the other. This practice became known as "doing the block". (Note: Not to be confused with the Australian expression "doing ones block" — to get extremely angry)

Author Fergus Hume described "doing the block" in his novel The Mystery of a Hansom Cab, first published in Melbourne in 1886:

It was Saturday morning and fashionable Melbourne was 'doing the block'. Collins Street is to the Southern city what Bond Street and the Row are to London, and the Boulevards to Paris... Carriages were bowling smoothly along, their occupants smiling and bowing as they recognized their friends on the side walk... Portly merchants, forgetting Flinders Lane and incoming ships, walked beside pretty daughters; and the representatives of swelldom were stalking along in their customary apparel of curly brimmed hats, high collars and immaculate suits. Altogether it was a pleasant and animated scene...

== History ==
=== The site ===
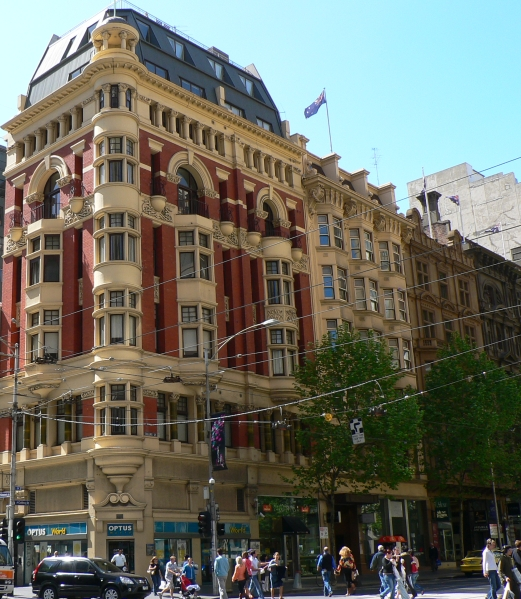
The Block Arcade forms an 'L' shape around Alston's Corner.

On 1 June 1837, the first auctions of blocks in what is now the Melbourne CBD took place. The block now occupied by the Collins Street portion of the arcade was purchased by William Briscoe & Son. The Briscoes Bulk Grain Store occupied the site from 1856 to 1883, building a large new premises in 1877.

In 1883, the building was sold to the George brothers' George & George Federal Emporium, established in 1880 a few doors up, who refurbished the interior for their expanding drapery business (which would eventually become Georges Store). Financier and landboomer Benjamin Fink was a director of the company, and by 1888 had plans to relocate the store and create an L-shaped arcade in the area, and began buying up properties. In 1888 Fink bought the Equitable Co-operative store at 162 Collins Street, and made it a branch of George's.

=== Construction ===
At 6:15 pm on Friday 13 September 1889, a huge fire gutted the Georges Emporium, causing over AU$400,00 worth of damage, and accelerating Finks plans, with George's consolidated at the new site.

The fire occurred at the height of the land boom of the 1880s, when Melbourne grew enormously and many large and elaborate hotels shops and office blocks rose in the city. The fire allowed the City Property & Co Pty Ltd (principal shareholder Benjamin Fink) to proceed with plans to create a sumptuous arcade on this central site, hiring architects Twentyman & Askew to design it, announced in January 1890, with the name 'The Block' revealed soon after. The Collins Street leg was built first, which was completed by late 1891, to little fanfare, with the grand opening of the whole arcade on 7 October 1893.

The Collins Street leg has an angled kink because the site narrows part way up due to the presence of a narrow laneway on the west side. Originally known as Carpenters Lane, the City Property Co successfully petitioned to roof it, creating a covered access from the Block Arcade to Little Collins Street. This in turn led to the development of shops in the lane, which was soon renamed Block Place. In 1902, Royal Arcade, which has been a dead end, was opened through to Little Collins Street creating a covered walk from Collins right through to Bourke Street.

The design is often said to have been inspired by the 1870s Galleria Vittorio in Milan, which has a similar domed crossing, but on a much vaster scale.

=== Ownership changes ===
In the 1986, the arcade was purchased by the Time Corporation for AU$15 million. By 1991, Westpac took over the mortgage and sold the building to the Kearney family in 1993 at public auction. The Kearneys undertook extensive refurbishment, repairing the mosaic floors, repainting the interior in heritage colours, and renovating the office spaces above.

In 2014, the Cohen family purchased the Block Arcade. The Cohen family have had long ties with Melbourne which date back to the 1840s, when Trevor Cohen's great-great-grandfather struck one of the first leases in Melbourne, for the ground floor of the nearby 'Cashmore's Corner' on the northeast corner of Collins and Elizabeth Streets, and where his great-grandmother was born. The Cohens are passionate about the precinct, and continue to maintain the Block Arcade to its former glory with an eye for detail.

=== Block Court arcade ===
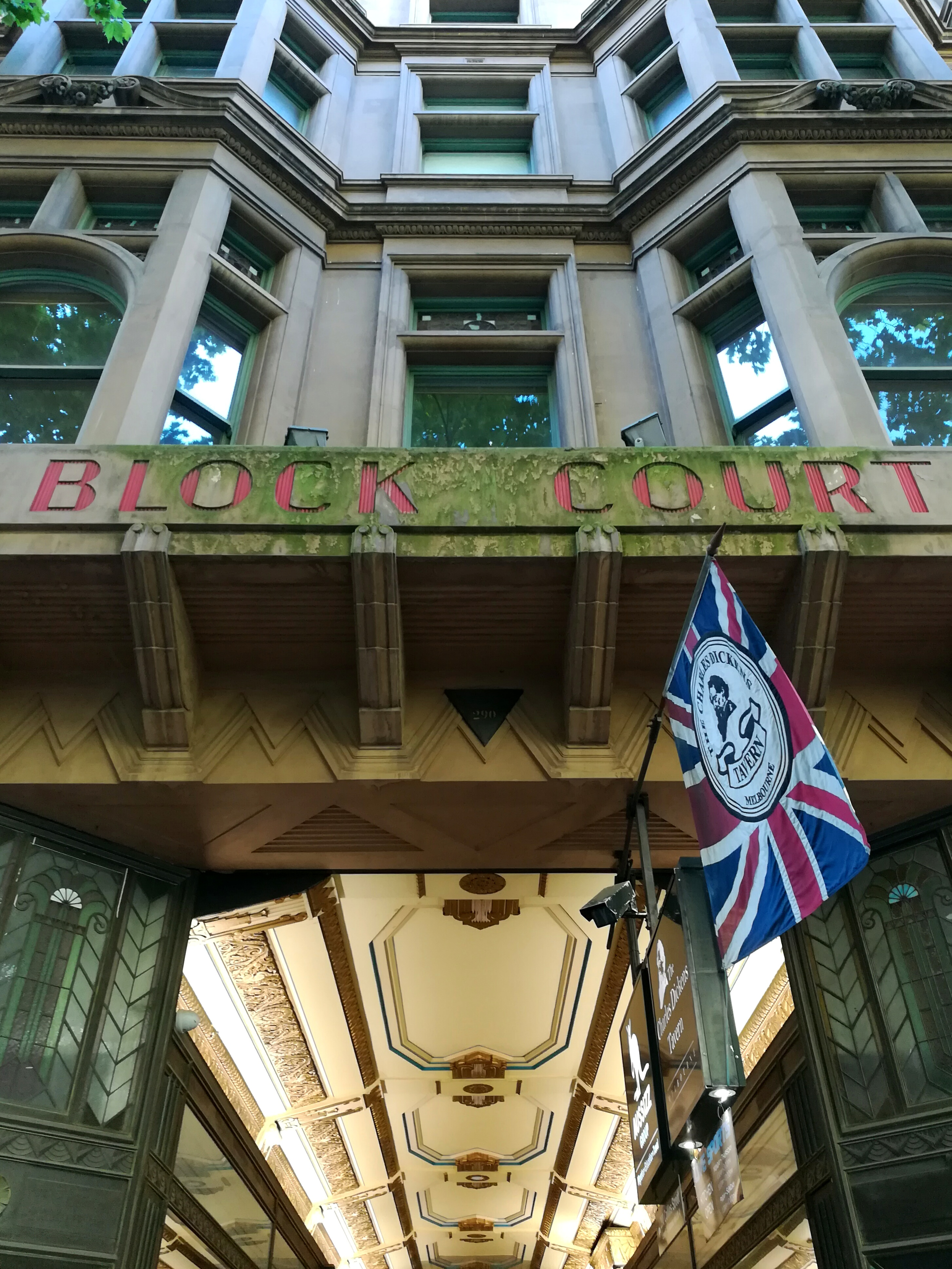
Block Court arcade entrance

The building adjacent to the Block Arcade at 288-292 Collins Street was built in 1890 as the Athenaeum Club, and in 1930 the ground floor was converted into an arcade. The works were designed by noted architect Harry Norris, and the arcade is one of the earliest, and most elaborate, Art Deco interiors in Melbourne. This arcade originally connected through to the Block Arcade with the removal of one of the shopfronts in the Elizabeth Street wing. At some point this building was bought by the owners of the Block Arcade, and they are still in the same ownership. In the 1990s, as part of the restoration of the Block Arcade, the shop was reinstated, and the north end of the Block Court arcade was altered to create a large area shop (by removing the shopfronts and installing a false floor and ceiling) . In 2016, the Block Court arcade was partially restored to create a bank, uncovering the floor and ceiling, with access through the rear to a laneway and then into the Block Arcade. In mid 2024 the bank left and the shopfronts were fully reinstated.

=== The Barcade Boys ===
In its heyday, The Block Arcade was a well known as a hangout for a young larrikin gang called "The Barcade Boys," who dealt drugs by day and hired prostitutes by night. Their presence became so notorious that shopkeepers in the Block Arcade petitioned for increased police patrols to curb the escalating crime. Among the ranks of The Barcade Boys were smaller-time standover crews and larrikin gangs who reportedly idolised notorious figures like Squizzy Taylor and Snowy Cutmore, emulating their style and criminal ambition in the heart of the city.

== Notable shops ==
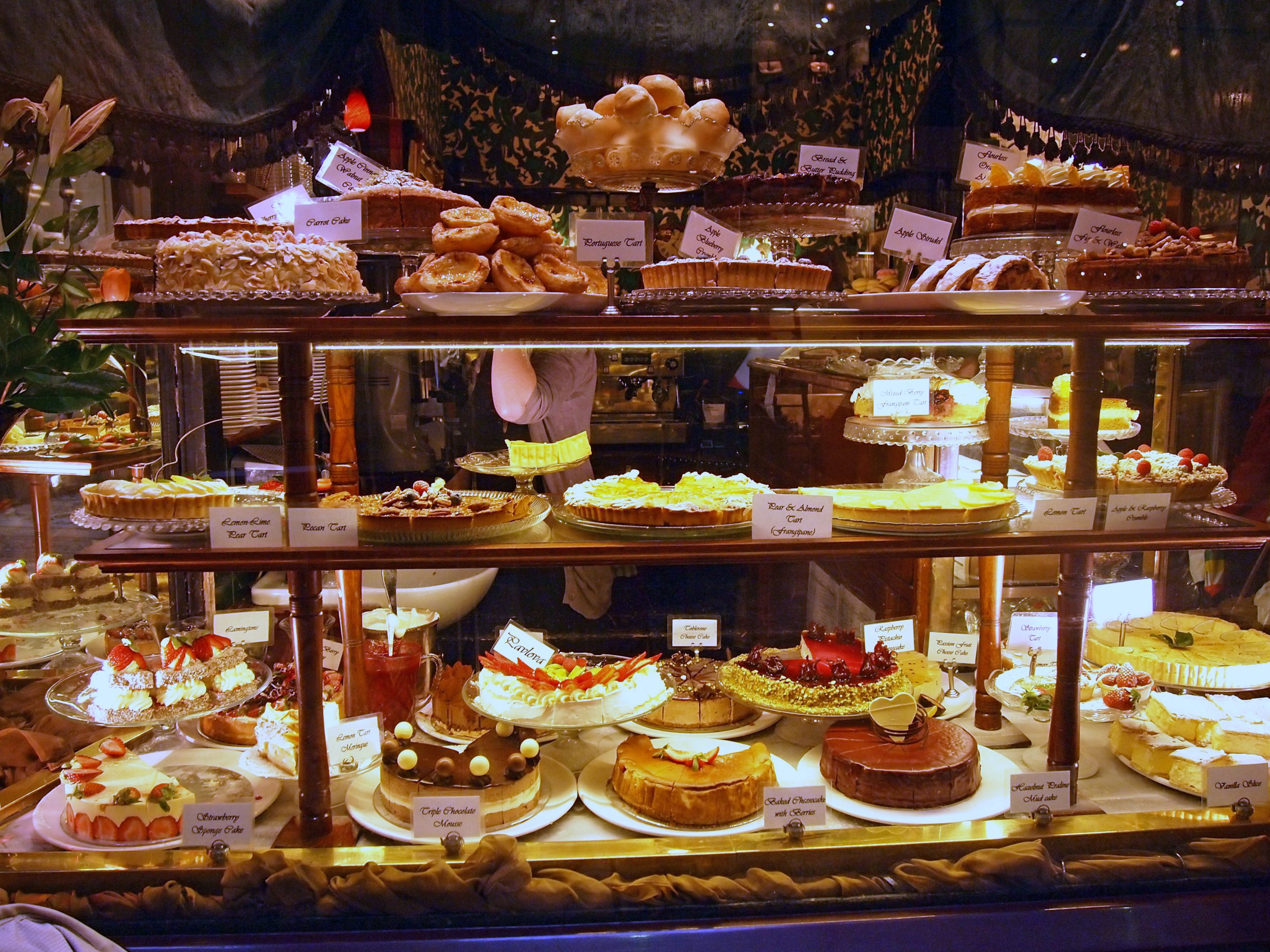
Hopetoun Tearoom window

The Hopetoun Tea Rooms opened in 1894, established by 'society girl' Miss Chrissie Robertson, 'daintily appointed' and intended for her society friends who did not wish to patronise ordinary tea rooms. Moving to the current rooms in 1907, it was redecorated in 1976 in Victorian style, with emerald and black wallpaper, and velvet ceiling hangings, designed by interior designer Murray Sheldrick. The Hopetoun Tea Rooms are sometimes confused with the tea room located in the rotunda of the Ladies Work Association, a charity for upper-class women who had fallen on hard times, which operated from 1891-c1900, and whose patron was Lady Hopetoun. The business went into receivership in 2020, and along with the right to the name was sold to a new owner who opened a new Hopetoun Tea Room in Bourke Street, with the arcade tea rooms reopened by the Cohen family as The Tea Rooms 1892.

The Singer Sewing Machine Company moved into the shop on the eastern side of the Collins Street entrance in 1902, where it remained for many years. The shop was popular with female patrons, and sewing classes were run in the basement. Phillip Goatcher, scenic artist, was commissioned to paint an elaborate mural on the ceiling, still in place.

In the shop to the left of the Collins Street entrance, the Block Arcade also housed the first Kodak store in Melbourne, the camera company from Rochester, New York. Kodak allowed the average person to take photographs and promoted the arts of photography to the general public, and the store sold parts, cameras, and equipment to both amateurs and professionals. It retains an elaborate pressed metal ceiling.

== Gallery ==
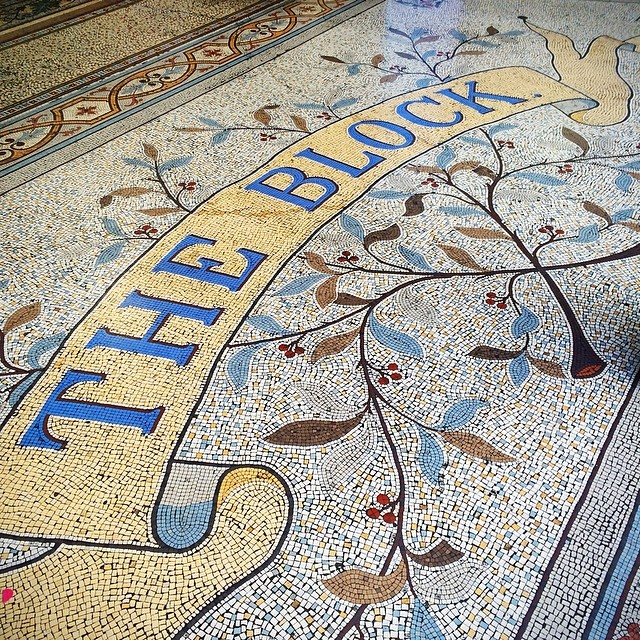
Detail of the mosaic tile floor

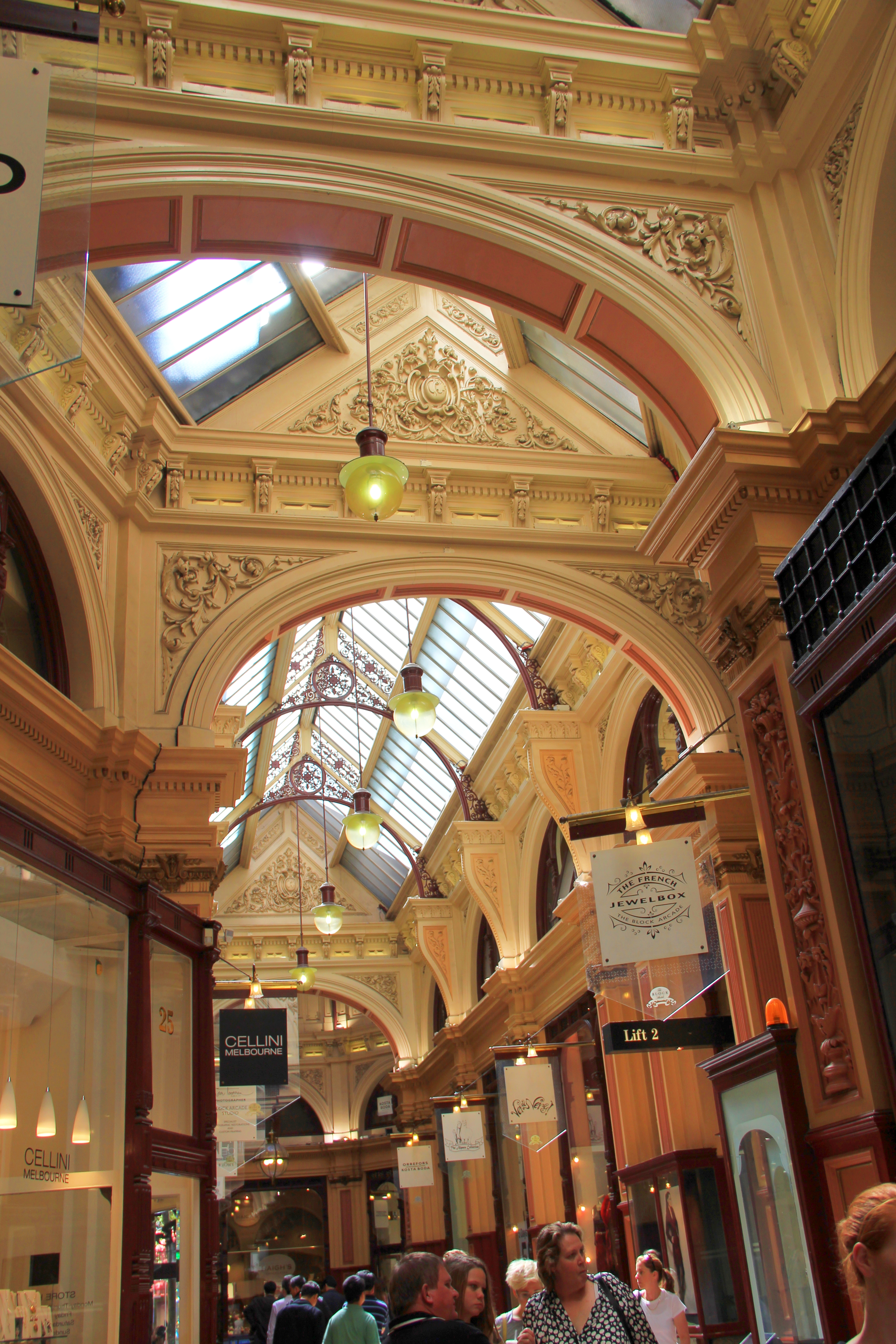
Decorative arches

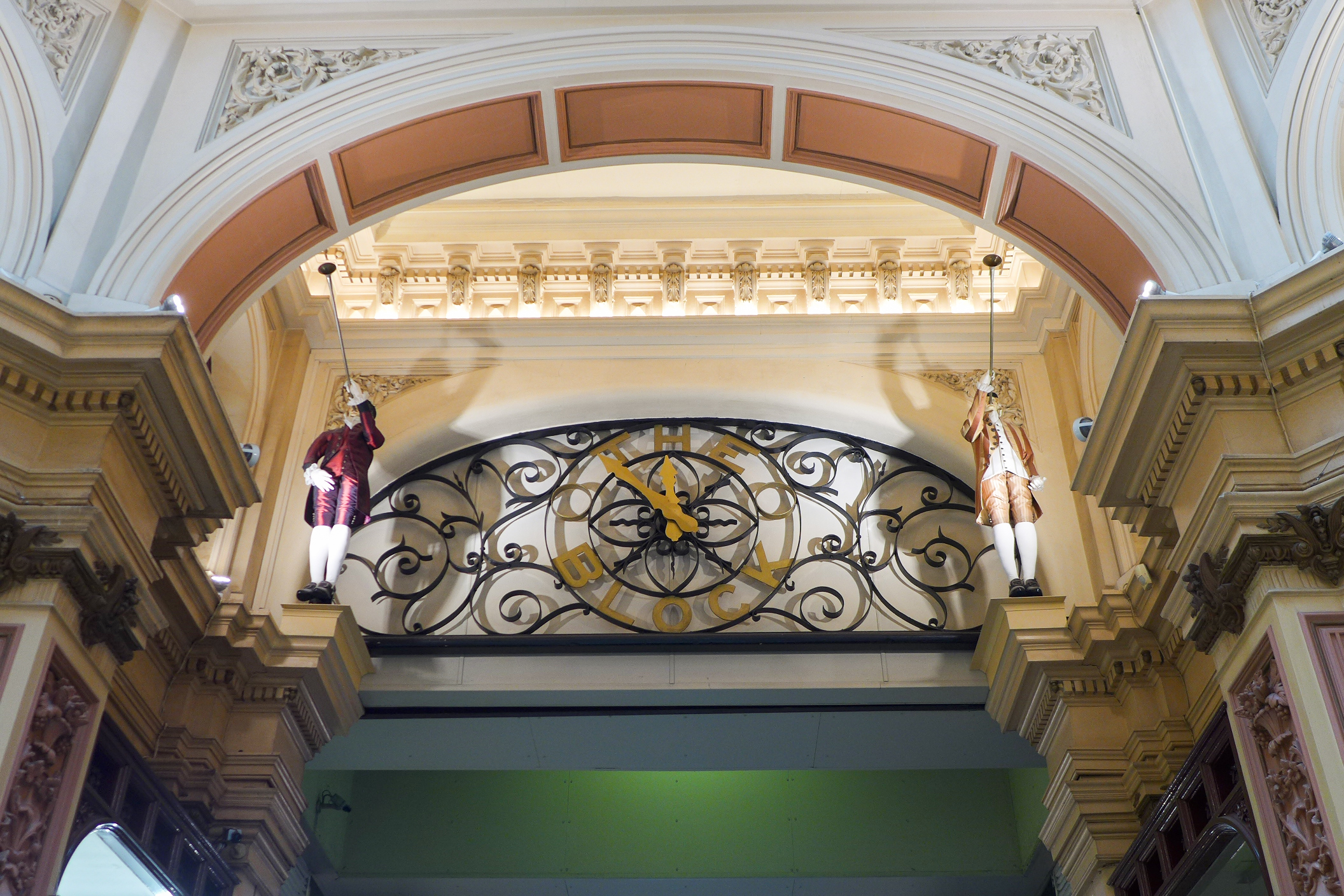
Clock

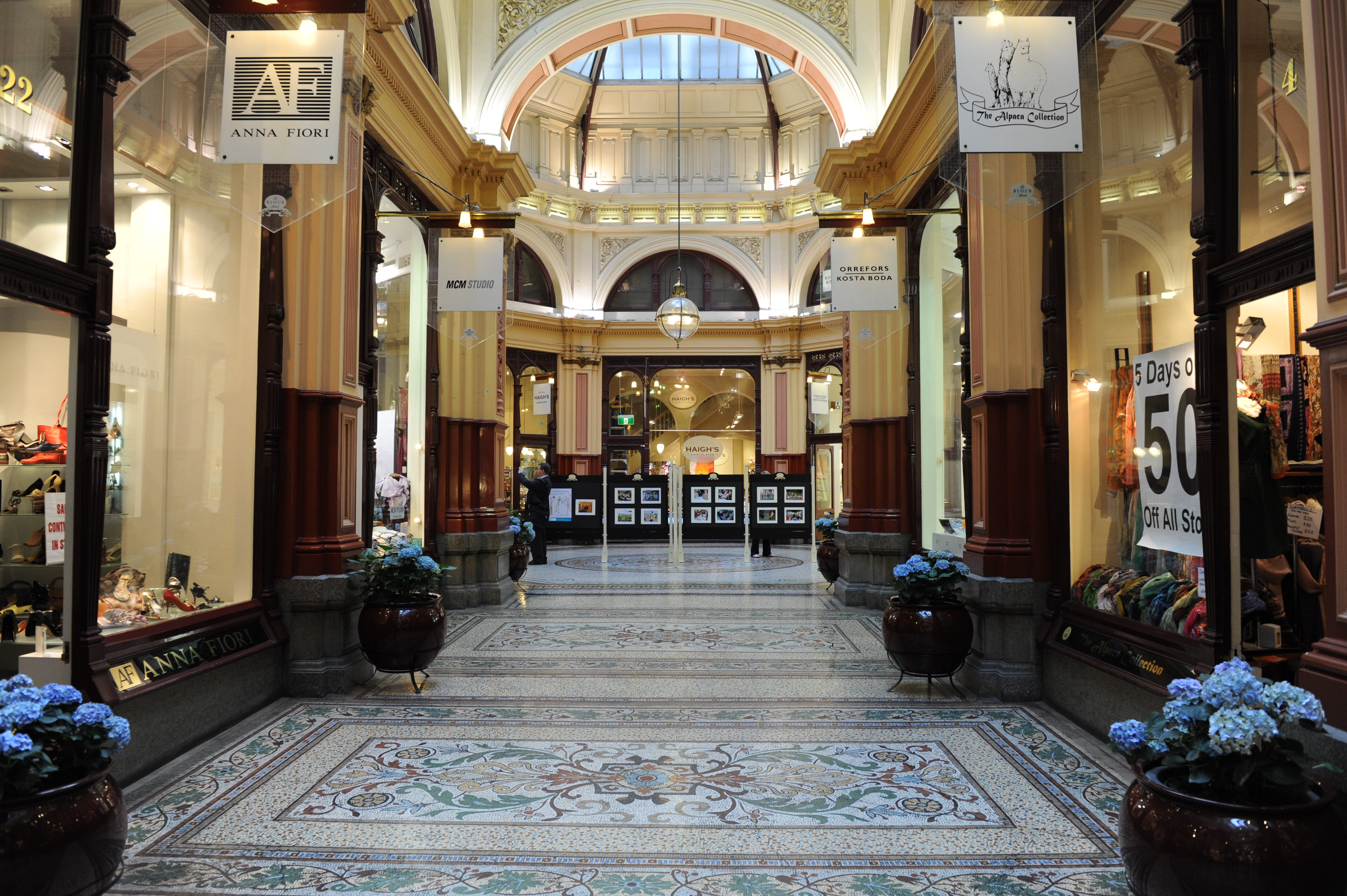
Collins Street leg

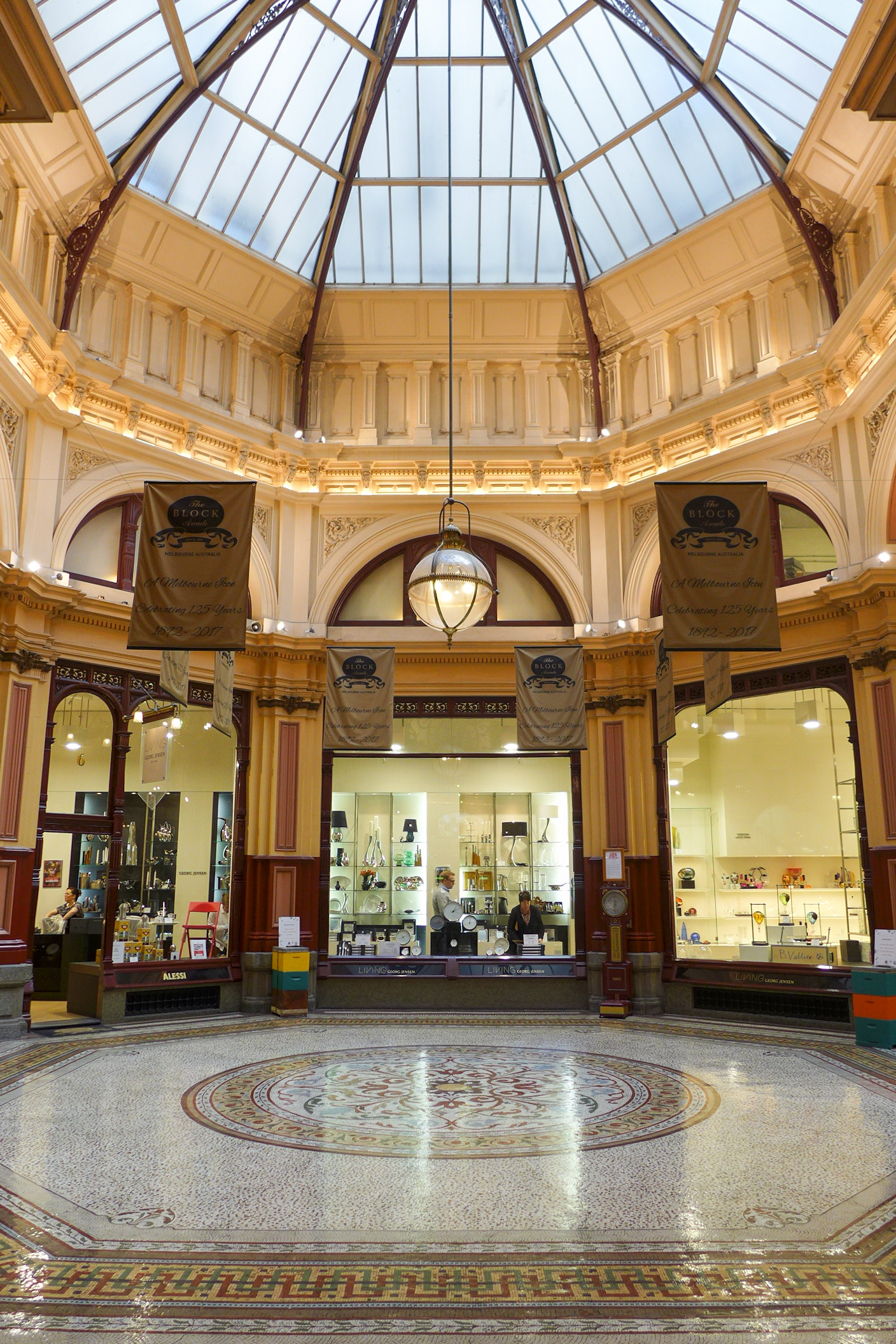
Central rotunda

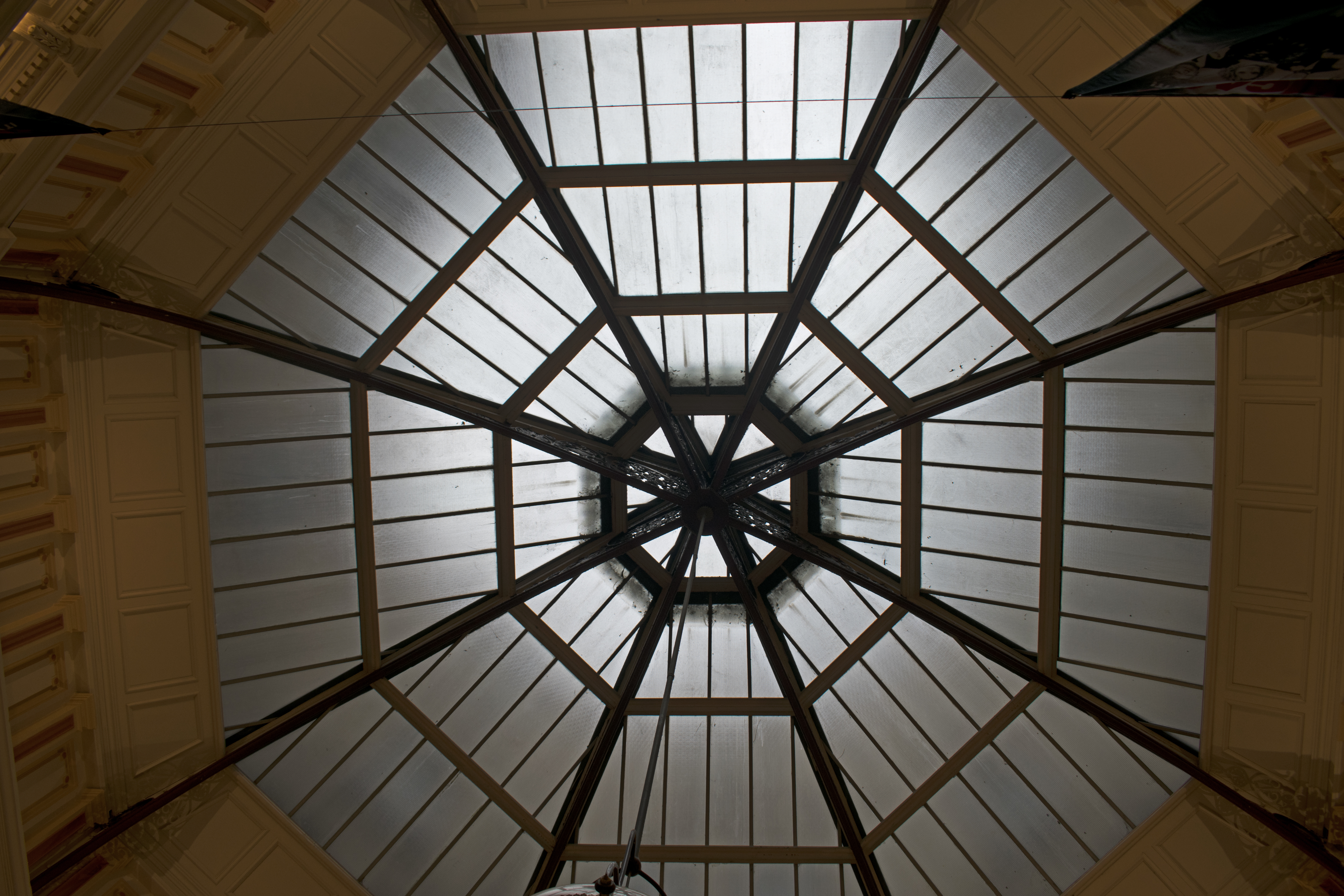
The dome of the central rotunda

== See also ==
- Architecture of Melbourne
- Lanes and arcades of Melbourne
