= Burnham Beeches, Sherbooke =

Heritage-listed house in Melbourne, Victoria, Australia

Burnham Beeches
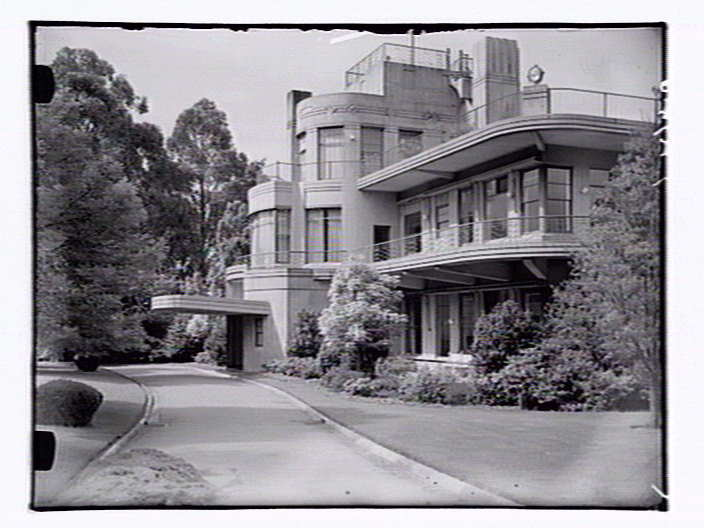
- The house in 1947

- Location of the house in Greater Metropolitan Melbourne
- Etymology: Burnham Beeches, Buckinghamshire

General information
- Status: Completed
- Type: House
- Architectural style: Streamline Moderne
- Location: Sherbrooke Road, Sherbrooke, Dandenong Ranges, Melbourne, Victoria, Australia
- Coordinates: 37°52′30″S 145°21′26″E
- Year built: 1933–1934
- Completed: 1934; 92 years ago

Technical details
- Material: Bricks; limestone; reinforced concrete
- Floor count: Three

Design and construction
- Architect: Harry Norris

Victorian Heritage Register
- Official name: Burnham Beeches and the Alfred Nicholas Memorial Gardens
- Type: Registered place
- Criteria: A, D, E, H
- Designated: 27 March 1991
- Reference no.: H0868
- Heritage overlay no.: HO5
- Categories: Farming and Grazing; Parks, Gardens and Trees; Residential buildings (private); Transient Accommodation; Science

Register of the National Estate
- Official name: Burnham Beeches & Alfred Nicholas Memorial Garden
- Type: Defunct register
- Designated: undated
- Reference no.: 100526

The Burnham Beeches is a mansion and its associated gardens, located on Sherbrooke Road in Sherbrooke, in the Dandenong Ranges, in the eastern suburbs of Melbourne, in Victoria, Australia. Built in 1930 on the traditional lands of the Wurundjeri people, the house was built for Alfred Nicholas, a sales magnate for the Australian subsidiary of Aspro.

The house was added to the Victorian Heritage Register on 27 March 1991 in recognition of its historical, architectural, and aesthetic significance; and was also added to non-statutory lists by the Victorian branch of the National Trust on 29 October 1987 and the now defunct Register of the National Estate on an unknown date.

== Etymology ==
The property was named after the English National Forest of Beech trees in the county of Buckinghamshire, near the location of Nicholas' Aspro factory in England.

== History ==
=== Colonial history ===
Land in the Parish of Monbulk was opened to selection in 1893 and the area now forming the place was first selected that year. Using provisions of the Land Act 1890, gardener and bee-keeper Henry Seaby selected approximately four hectares (ten acres) in August 1893 which comprised much of the land Alfred Nicholas later used for his terraced garden. Another gardener, Gerald Watt, selected just approximately four hectares (ten acres) at the same time where Nicholas later constructed his ornamental pond. Tourism in the Dandenongs increased sharply with the construction of guest houses in the first decades of the twentieth century. This was aided by the access afforded by the new narrow gauge railway link with Emerald and Gembrook and, in the 1920s, by the popularity of motor vehicles.

=== Nicholas family acquisition ===
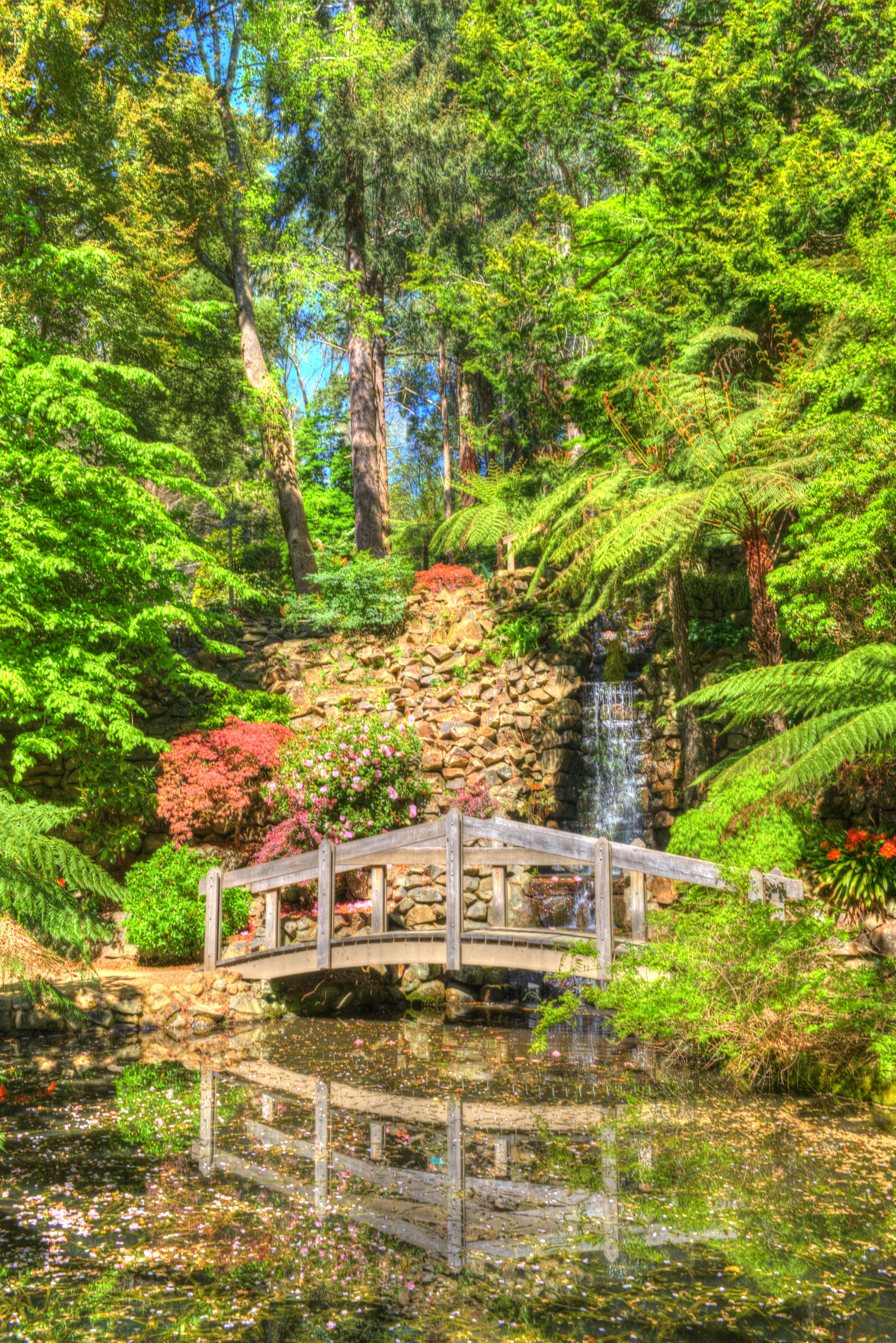
Alfred Nicholas Memorial Gardens

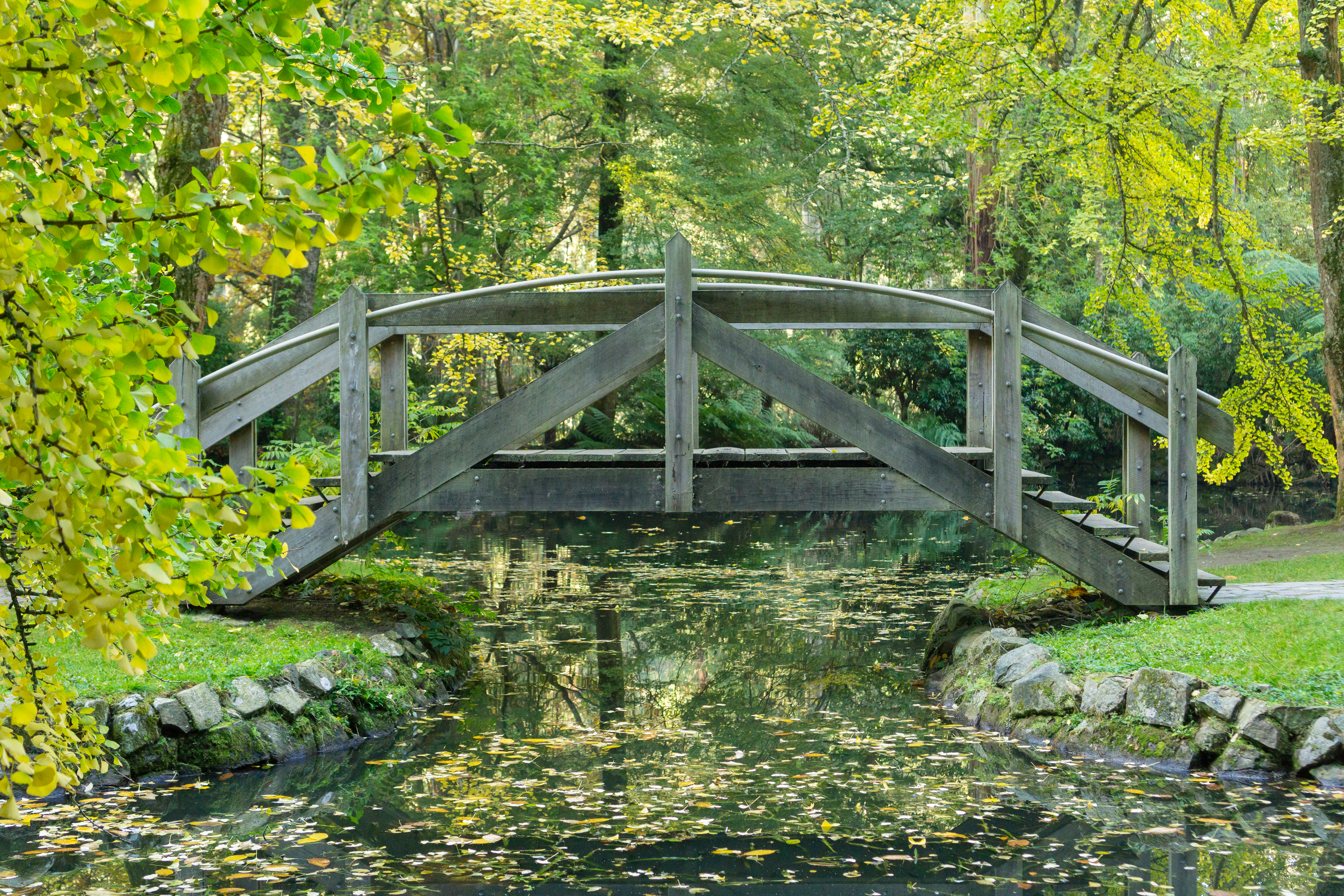
Lake at the gardens

The land for Burnham Beeches was acquired by the prominent Melbourne merchant and Aspro manufacturer, Alfred Nicholas, from 1926. Several adjacent properties were acquired together with an area of land held on permissive occupancy from the Crown Lands Department. In total, the Burnham Beeches property comprised approximately twenty-four hectares (sixty acres). The architect was Harry Norris, who had toured Europe and America in 1929 for G. J. Coles to research the latest elements in chain-store design and construction before he finalised the plans for Coles store No. 12, the Bourke Street store. Nicholas and Norris were neighbours in Melbourne, and Norris was engaged to design a house with the brief that it was to have “fresh air, sunshine and an outlook of command, yet under control”.

There was much interest in the completion of the main residence, with the Nicholas family being prominent members of Melbourne society at the time. The Age, reporting on construction progress, was complimentary of the design, stating that ‘much ingenuity was shown in accordance with present day tendencies in designing this massive but simple home’. It was ‘a well-conceived adaptation of a style which came into prominence on the Continent and in America during 1931-32.’ The architecture of the house is understood to have been influenced by the desire to allow as much light and air as possible into the rooms, as well as a preference for a modern, ‘daring’ style. Harry Norris’s design incorporated numerous characteristics of the Streamline Moderne style, including strong horizontal lines with a central vertical element, curved, cantilevered balconies, and wide expanses of glazing, supported by the reinforced concrete construction. Internally, luxurious fixtures and fittings were installed, including in bathrooms, door furnishings as well as in heating and refrigeration.

The internal planning included a huge lounge, music room, study and dining on the ground floor, sunrooms to both ground and first floor, with bedroom suites to the first floor. Staff quarters and a theatrette were included in the basement level. The Australian Home Beautiful, in the first of a series articles dedicated to the property through the 1930s, declared Burnham Beeches to be ‘a wonder in the hills’. The 1934 article was a detailed survey of the rooms, including the bedrooms, sunrooms, lounge and rooftop. The house was described both as a ‘gigantic aeroplane come to rest on the hilltop’ and as a ‘towering bulk of a great battleship with turrets, masts and a searchlight’. Aside from transport metaphors, the house was ‘from any viewpoint’, ‘unusual and extremely interesting’. The views gained from the interior spaces were of particular note, with the writer observing ‘the bewildering vista’ gained from the vast lounge windows, with the sunrooms ‘command[ing] the springlike morning sunshine, and every beautiful view is accessible through the huge plate windows’. Each view was ‘literally exclusive’, ‘particular to one window in one home on one mountain’. Harry Norris was quoted, describing the key aspects to the brief, that Nicholas wanted ‘fresh air, sunshine and outlook at command and under control’.

The writer concluded that: ‘Burnham Beeches’ will always be a source of interest and of curiosity to outsiders, whether they are visiting tourists or merely passers-by. It is so large, so conspicuous and so intriguing that this is inevitable …

The garden progressed while the main residence was being constructed. Percy Trevaskis, to whom Nicholas was introduced at the 1929 Chelsea Flower Show, was brought out as head gardener to superintend the gardens at Burnham Beeches. A gardener's cottage was erected to the west of the main residence for the use of Mr and Mrs Trevaskis. Nicholas had ‘very definite views’ on the planning of the Burnham Beeches landscape, with garden curator Hugh Linaker also consulted in the development of the gardens and park. More than sixty workers were engaged from 1929 to create what the Australian Home Beautiful proclaimed in 1935 were ‘the most wonderful gardens in the Southern Hemisphere’:

"It is remarkable in configuration … The slope is laid out in parkland and paddocks; the dip is ribbed with terraces, threaded with pathways and planted with thousands of wonderful trees … [Nicholas] encouraged the idea of boldness; of developing the marvellous possibilities for landscape architecture on the grand scale, and of making Burnham Beeches one day a useful arboretum for the State. [The garden plan] aims at the transformation of the whole area into a cultivated park … From gardens all through the hills Mr Nicholas has bought growing trees … he bought complete the abandoned garden of a burned-out house. Maples, hollies, cedars and poplars of all ages and sizes have been lifted…"

— Australian Home Beautiful, 1935.

In 1933, 150 trees were imported from England. To honour the name of the estate, the planting of both green and copper Beech was accentuated, many being planted in the grounds and on the roadside nature strips. The extensive garden included distinct areas of rockeries, crazy paved pathways, lawn and terracing to the rear of the house, leading to what would become the forest, with its paths, rockeries, and water features. Along with the mature trees and plants from other private gardens, specimens were acquired from the nearby Nobelius nursery. Along with the formal garden and parkland areas of the property, Burnham Beeches incorporated extensive farm and other outbuildings, including cattle pavilion, stables, hot houses, motor garage and machinery shed.

The ornamental lake was constructed c. 1937 – c. 1939, although Alfred Nicholas died on 26 February 1937 and he presumably never saw the lake filled.

==== Mountain retreat ====
Burnham Beeches was designed as a comfortable mountain retreat for the Nicholas family, and its numerous entertainment and recreational facilities are evidence of both the wealth of the property’s owners, and the intent to have every recreational convenience for the family’s use. Along with an urban residence and a seaside holiday house, a country or mountain retreat in areas like the Dandenong Ranges or Mount Macedon was a typical status symbol for wealthy gentry in the nineteenth century and into the first half of the twentieth century. The acquisition of a country seat, as noted by Heritage Alliance, was in the ‘best English tradition’ for a man of Nicholas’s wealth and status. The house was initially a weekend or holiday retreat for the family, with the family making it a primary residence as Alfred’s health deteriorated.

The house incorporated numerous areas for recreation and relaxation for the individual family members, including the extensive lounge room on the ground floor, the sunrooms on each level, the music room, dining room, as well as the basement level theatrette. Beyond the residence itself, the property incorporated the indoor pool and squash court, accommodated in a low pavilion annexe immediately to the south-east of the residence, as well as the garden, tennis court, tan horse riding track, the lake for fishing and boating, and a croquet lawn. Social events were held at the property, including a dance in honour of Nicholas’ nieces in November 1934, where the ‘grounds were converted into a veritable fairyland’. Charitable fundraising events were also held, including the annual opening of the gardens in aid of the Australian Red Cross. Aside from more formal or public events, the property was regularly attended by personal visitors for tennis, lunch or tea, particularly those of the teenaged Nicholas children. A final family event was held in the gardens at Burnham Beeches in February 1940, the wedding of daughter Margery, attended by notaries including the then Prime Minister, Robert Menzies.

==== Working farm ====
The relative isolation of the site and a desire by Alfred Nicholas for the Burnham Beeches to be economically viable, saw the development of large and diverse farming activities at the broader property, including livestock, dairy and poultry, flowers and other crops. The produce from the farm both sustained the household in terms of food and brought in some income with sales at local markets. Buildings associated with farming at Burnham Beeches included the cattle pavilion, calf shed, pigsty, chicken coop, and greenhouses, along with extensive vegetable gardens, orchards and paddocks. Many of the household and farming staff were accommodated on site, including the staff quarters in the basement of the residence, and timber cottages.

=== Institutional use of the Burnham Beeches estate ===
Nicholas died in 1937 and was survived by his widow, Isabel and two children. He resided at Burnham Beeches for less than four years. From the 1940s, Burnham Beeches was used increasingly for institutional use as the Nicholas family relocated their lives from their mountain home. Isabel Nicholas and her children remained at the site until c. 1941, when the two children were each married, Maurice in late 1937 and Margery in 1940. Maurice constructed a new residence on a property adjacent to the Burnham Beeches, called Strathalbyn.

With the outbreak of war, the Melbourne Children's Hospital approached Isabel Nicholas about the use of Burnham Beeches as a potential site to relocate some of the hospital’s patients and services. Although negotiations were ongoing, it was not until late 1941 that the family was informed by the hospital that the site would be required, and alterations were to be undertaken. Changes made to the residence included the removal of carpet and the upgrade to the sewerage system, as well as the removal of all furniture and installation of medical equipment. The hospital occupied the property until mid-1943.

After the hospital’s departure, Isabel Nicholas did not return to the property until 1949, following repairs and redecoration works to the house. The cottage known as Stringers Cottage, situated to the south-west of the house and which accommodated friends of the Nicholas family, was destroyed by fire in 1948. However, despite her return in early 1949, Isabel soon based herself again in Melbourne, after Maurice sold Stathalbyn in 1950.

After its brief reoccupation as a residence, Burnham Beeches was converted to the newly established Nicholas Institute for Medical and Veterinary Research from 1955 until 1981. Alterations for this new use were undertaken by architects Yuncken, Freeman Brothers, Griffiths & Simpson and building contractors G. A. Winwood Pty Ltd. The institute was opened in December 1955 by Prime Minister Menzies, who declared the conversion from residence to research facility, ‘a stroke of imaginative genius’.

The residence’s rooms were used as reception area (former lounge), staff cafeteria (former dining room), lecture theatre (theatrette), library (former sunroom) and laboratories. Outbuildings were used for the accommodation of animals used for testing.

=== Alfred Nicholas Memorial Gardens ===
It was during the institute’s occupation of the site that the gardens were excised from the property and donated to the Shire of Sherbrooke in 1965 (subsequently transferred to the Victorian Government), forming the Alfred Nicholas Memorial Gardens. There was considerable controversy in July 1968 when the Shire removed almost 100 mature Australian mountain ash trees from the entry to the Alfred Nicholas Memorial Gardens. one hectare (three acres) of the garden (including the section cleared by the Council in 1968 and the Upper pools) was leased during 1971-73 to the Robson and Koslowski families who ran a miniature village known as ‘Kindyville’ on the lawn beside the front drive.

In August 1973, the Alfred Nicholas Memorial Gardens was transferred to the Forests Commission. A research station for the study of the Mountain Ash and various insect pests was established on the site and drawings for the extant brick building were signed by Hugh Flockart, Public Works Department Senior Project Architect, on 30 October 1973. A curved shed adjacent to the research station building was erected to study the effects of sirex wasp in pinus timber. A nursery was established on the cleared eastern portion of the site in conjunction with the Hamer Arboretum. Much new planting was undertaken during this time.

=== Contemporary use ===
Burnham Beeches was purchased by businessman, restaurateur and hospitality expert, John Guy, who converted the former residence and institute into a hotel, including removal of laboratories, offices and the staff canteen and some original internal partition walls. Burnham Beeches Country House opened in April 1983 and comprised five hotel suites, kitchen and bar, and patisserie, bakery, kitchen and cellar, as well as the 100-seat restaurant in the former ground floor lounge for which the site became known. Subsequently, the indoor pool annexe was removed and an additional two multistorey wings were constructed adding 48 new hotel suites, as well as function rooms, and new swimming pool.

Management of the Alfred Nicholas Memorial Gardens was transferred to the Department of Conservation, Forests and Lands in 1985. Much work was done including the renewal of bridges on the ornamental lake, restoration of the entry gates and general maintenance and rejuvenation of the gardens. The residence was extended in 1986 resulting in the destruction of the Nicholas swimming pool and tennis court.

The property was sold again in 1987, the commencement of a period of changing ownership and an uncertain future for Burnham Beeches. Aman Resorts operated the Burnham Beeches Country House until 1990, when it was acquired by Raymond Hall and Michael Wilson in 1990. The hotel was last operated by Adrian Zencha (Aman Resorts) in 1991. A group of investors commenced works in 2005 but ceased those works in 2008.

In early 1992, the hotel was closed for a programme of major refurbishment. Since this time, there have been numerous proposals for the redevelopment and occupation of Burnham Beeches. These have included retirement living, tourism and other hotel operations, which failed to eventuate for a variety of financial, planning and approval reasons.

The hotel continued to operate under the ownership of Burnham Beeches (International) Pty Ltd, closing in 1992 for extensive planned renovations. An auction of hotel furniture, crockery, fittings and other items was held in June 1992. Although permits for the renovation works were issued by both the Shire of Sherbrooke and the Historic Buildings Council in 1991, the building was vacant from mid-1992. The property was purchased in 2010 by investor Adam Garrisson (Oriental Pacific Group). and chef and restaurateur Shannon Bennett. The pair proposed to utilise the buildings and grounds to create a "sustainable resort" with hotel, spa, wellness centre, villas, café, bakery, function areas and restaurant. The ambitious proposal, with much residential accommodation included, proved to be contentious because of the possible adverse impact on existing residents and the overall very special nature of the Sherbrooke/Dandenongs region; there were also concerns over health and safety issues such as traffic management and bushfire response. The proposal was rejected pending further information at the Yarra Ranges Council meeting of 11 August 2015.

In March 2019, Burnham Beeches was transformed into an art installation by street artist Rone aka Tyrone Wright, ahead of its conversion into a luxury hotel scheduled to begin in mid-2019. This did not eventuate and the mansion remains vacant, despite ongoing proposals for redevelopment.

In 2022, the property was purchased by Trenerry Consortium.

== Description ==
Burnham Beeches and the Alfred Nicholas Memorial Gardens, a three-storey Streamline Moderne mansion (designed by Harry Norris and built in 1933-34) with interwar outbuildings, set within an extensive landscaped garden. It includes the estate’s early and highly intact gardens (now the Alfred Nicholas Memorial Gardens), which features a massive, terraced rockery, an ornamental lake constructed on a tributary of Sassafras Creek, and an extensive collection of imported and locally transplanted specimen trees. It also includes an interwar cottage and remnant farm and other structures related to the operation of the place. The lines are said to be reminiscent of an ocean liner. The zig-zag motif was used as decoration on the decorative wrought-iron work and the balcony balustrades. The exterior of the house was of reinforced concrete, painted white and decorated with Australian motifs of koalas and possums in moulded relief panels.

A 1980s pamphlet stated that the house included a “private theaterette with talkie equipment”, an “electric pipe-organ” in the music room, orchid houses, a dairy with “prize Jersey cows”, and the gardens included artificial waterfalls, a lake and floodlighting at night.

== See also ==
- Architecture of Melbourne
- List of gardens in Victoria
- List of places on the Victorian Heritage Register in the Shire of Yarra Ranges
- Nicholas Building
