= Aspro =

Aspro or ASPRO may refer to:

- ASPRO chronology, a dating system of the ancient Near East used for archaeological sites ("Atlas des sites du Proche-Orient")
- Aspro convention, a contract bridge bidding convention
- Aspro Parks, a Spanish leisure corporation
- USS Aspro, the name of more than one United States Navy ship
- Aspro (fish), a genus of fish, now synonymous with Zingel
  - Zingel asper, a species of fish previously named Aspro vulgaris and Aspro apron
- Aspro, a brand name; see History of aspirin

== See also ==
- Asptro convention
- Astro convention
