= Hendra (house) =

Heritage-listed house in Melbourne, Victoria, Australia

- Location of the house in Greater Metropolitan Melbourne
- Interactive map of the Hendra area

General information
- Status: Completed
- Type: House
- Architectural style: Inter-war Old English; Streamlined Moderne
- Location: 11 Willams Road, Mount Eliza, Mornington Peninsula, Melbourne, Victoria, Australia
- Coordinates: 38°10′28″S 145°05′28″E
- Completed: 1938; 88 years ago
- Client: Sir Edgar and Dame Mabel Coles

Technical details
- Material: Rendered bricks; shingle roof; terracotta
- Grounds: 27 hectares (67 acres) (1939–1994); 1.7 ha (4.2 acres) (since 1994)

Design and construction
- Architect: Harry Norris

Victorian Heritage Register
- Official name: Hendra
- Type: Registered place
- Designated: 21 December 2000
- Reference no.: H1907
- Heritage overlay no.: HO249
- Category: Residential buildings (private)

Hendra is a house located at 11 Willams Road in Mount Eliza, on the Mornington Peninsula, in the south eastern suburbs of Melbourne, in Victoria, Australia.

Built in 1938 on the traditional lands of the Bunurong people, the house was added to the Victorian Heritage Register on 21 December 2000 in recognition of its historical and architectural significance; and was also identified for adding to a non-statutory list by the Victorian branch of the National Trust on an unknown date.

== Description ==
Hendra is a single-storey brick residence constructed in 1938 as a country house for Sir Edgar Barton Coles (E.B. Coles), one of the six brothers of Sir George (G.J. Coles), and Edgar's family. Designed by the prominent commercial architect, Harry Norris, the house exterior was completed in an unusual mix of the Inter-war Old English style with Streamlined Moderne detailing. The house is constructed of rendered brick with a massive, steeply pitched terracotta shingled roof.

Hendra is historically significant for its association with the Coles family, whose chain of retail stores became a household word across the nation from the 1920s. Built for Sir Edgar, who was for 23 years the company secretary, the house was designed for comfortable family living and entertaining. Its layout, with staff quarters, swimming pool and large reception rooms, reflected a way of life that disappeared after World War II.

The Coles family often opened Hendra for various charity and social events.

Initially set on 27 hectares (67 acres), the land was subdivided in 1994, with the house set on 1.7 hectares (4.2 acres) when it was purchased by Greg Farmer, a property developer, in 2006 for A$4.825 million, who then completed a major renovation. Farmer sold Hendra in 2014 for $7.25 million – with seven bedrooms, six bathrooms, a master bedroom with an ensuite and dressing room, a tennis court and swimming pool – purchased by Min Zhang, wife of Jianping Fu. In late 2014, a modern addition to the property was proposed, designed by Architeria Architects.

== See also ==
- Architecture of Melbourne
- List of places on the Victorian Heritage Register in the Shire of Mornington Peninsula
