= Curtin House =

Commercial building in Melbourne, Australia

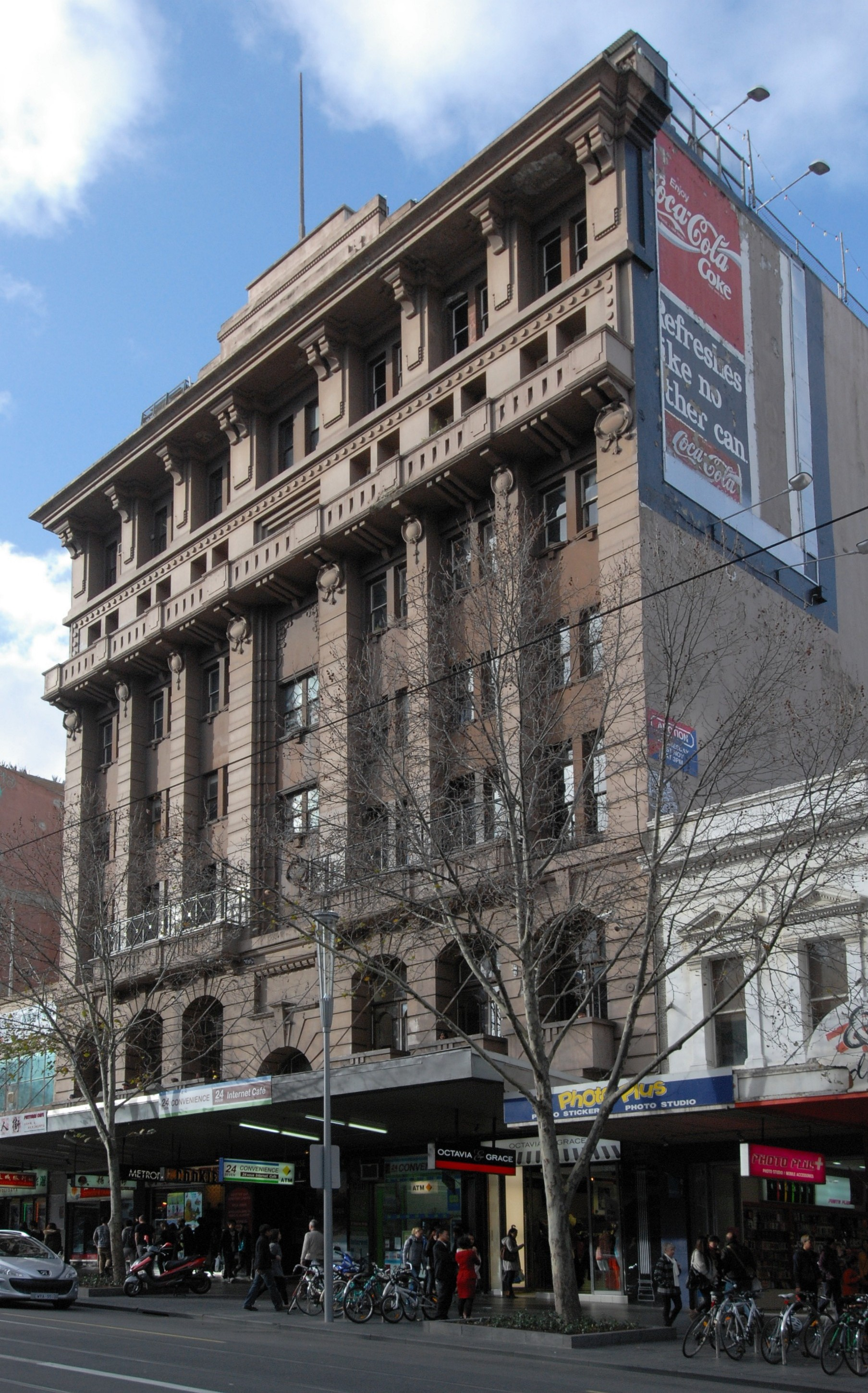
- Former names: Tattersall's Club; Tattersalls Building

General information
- Architectural style: Art Nouveau
- Location: 248–256 Swanston St, Melbourne, Australia
- Coordinates: 37°48′43.2″S 144°57′54.7″E
- Opened: 1922
- Cost: £50,000

Dimensions
- Other dimensions: Frontage of 81 ft 5 in to Swanston St. by a depth of 88 ft on the southern boundary and 66 ft on the north side. It has a rear frontage of 50 ft 8 into Tattersalls Lane.

Technical details
- Structural system: Structure of reinforced concrete (as placed by the Steel Form Supply Co P/L)
- Floor count: 6
- Floor area: 21,360 sq. ft.
- Lifts/elevators: Single lift within open cage encircled by stairs.

Design and construction
- Architect: Harry Norris
- Architecture firm: Harry Norris
- Civil engineer: Hawkins & Bendixsen

Curtin House is a six-storey Commercial Palazzo style building on Swanston Street in the Melbourne city centre, built in 1922 for the Tattersalls Club with offices to rent, and transformed in the early 2000s into a 'vertical laneway', with a range of specialist retailing, dining, and entertainment spaces occupying every floor and the roof.

== History ==
Curtin House was built in 1922 as the Tattersalls Club, on the site of Nunans's Buildings destroyed by fire on April 13, 1921. The fire claimed one victim, Miss Gertrude K Riley. Morton Parker Pimentel, director of Federation Films on the third floor, was accused of having started the fire deliberately, but the evidence was slight.

The Tattersalls Club building contained shops on the ground floor, bar and dining room and meeting rooms on the next two floors for the Club members, who were from the horse racing world, and offices to let above. It was one of the first major works of architect Harry Norris, who went on to design many important city buildings in the interwar years. The Club either disbanded or merged with another club and left the building in 1937, when their rooms were put up for lease with the bar and other fitting sold off in 1940.

In the late 1930s and early 1940s, the building housed the offices of the Victorian Branch of the Communist Party and its youth wing the League of Young Democrats. As supporters of Stalin, who had made a pact with Hitler, the CPA Australia was anti-war, and so seen as unpatriotic, and their offices and library here were famously raided on 17 June 1940 minutes after the Federal Cabinet decided to ban the party, 'seizing enough literature to fill two vans'. The League of Young Democrats had been spared, but were also raided on 25 February 1941 minutes after it too was declared illegal by Cabinet.

By 1948, the name had been changed to Curtin House, when it was reported as having become the new home of the National Secretariat of Catholic Action, which included a range of Catholic organisations and a bookshop, in the old Club rooms on the first floor. It is presumed that the new name commemorated the wartime Labor Prime Minister John Curtin, who had died in office in 1945. He was a lapsed Catholic, but it is not known exactly why or when the name was changed.

In 1967, it was leased by the Academy of Modern Greek (the Academy), a private Greek language school established by a group of community leaders to address the language, history and culture learning-needs of the school-aged children of the growing Greek community. Spiro Liolios was appointed Principal of the Academy and within a few months, he and his wife, Koula Liolios, took over the ownership of the school. The school flourished under their educational leadership and was the largest Greek school in Melbourne for many years, outgrowing all six floors of Curtin House by 1977; subsequently moving to the Theosophical Society Building, 187 Collins Street, Melbourne, where it continued to operate successfully until the 1990s.

During the 60s and 1970s, Spiro Liolios also operated a number of other businesses within the building, such as Golden Guide Publishing, which distributed the free community telephone book and community services guide, the Greek Golden Guide, to the Greek community; as well as the Italian Golden Guide, to the Italian community. He also established (with his accountant, Andrew Petrakis, as partner) and successfully operated a secretarial college, Swanston College, offering typing, shorthand, and office administration certificate and diploma courses. Spiro and Koula Liolios also successfully operated the Academy Interpreting and Translating for many years. All from within the six storeys of Curtin House.

Through the 1980s and 1990s, Curtin House was occupied by a range of business and organisations attracted by the cheap rent, such as the Genealogical Society, and eventually used for pop up exhibitions and not quite legal residential space. The esteemed May Downs School of Dance ran classes on level 6 in the early 80’s.

Famous residents included Barrie Kosky and Chunky Move dance company's artistic director Gideon Obarzanek.

== Transformation ==
In 2000 it was bought by group of investors led by Tim Peach. Following some restoration the rejuvenated Curtin House was progressively leased to a range of 'creative industries' and multiple food and entertainment venues. In 2003, the first to open was the bar-cum restaurant Cookie, occupying the high-ceilinged former club room on the first floor, developed by Camillo and Monika Ippoliti. The design by Phillip Schemnitz retained the main surviving features and combined them with careful interventions, and won a Hall of Fame gong in the 2018 Eat Drink awards. Melbourne's first rooftop cinema simply called Rooftop Cinema opened in 2006, and the Toff in Town live music and performance venue opened on the second floor in 2007.

Other tenants include Metropolis Bookstore which relocated from St Kilda in 2001. In 2019. tenants included the four street level shops, Cookie, the Toff, Metropolis, a rare record store, a hair salon and two clothes retailers on the 3rd floor, another clothes retailer, an architecture office, and brand designer in the 4th floor, a whole floor residence on the 5th, and Mesa Verde restaurant on the 6th, and the Rooftop Bar and Cinema.
