= Cathedral Arcade =

Shopping arcade in Melbourne, Australia

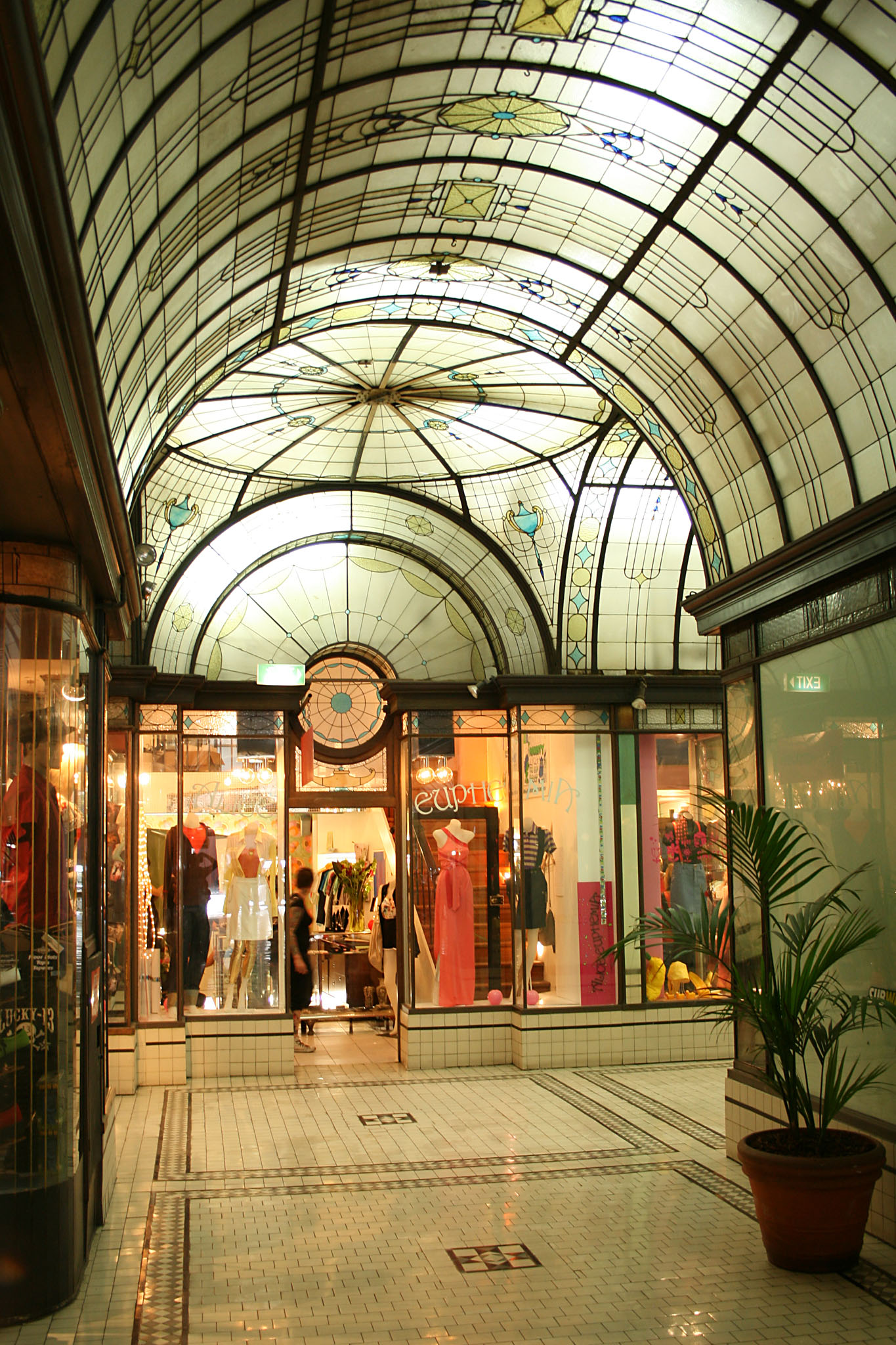
- View of Cathedral Arcade looking west from Swanston Street
- Location: Victoria, Australia
- Coordinates: 37°49′0″S 144°58′1″E
- Address: 37 Swanston Street, Melbourne
- Opened: 1926; 100 years ago
- Public transit: Town Hall; City Square/Swanston Street (#11): 1, 3, 5, 6, 16, 64, 67, 72

Victorian Heritage Register
- Official name: Nicholas building
- Type: State Registered Place
- Designated: November 1, 2007
- Reference no.: H2119
- Heritage Overlay number: HO745

Cathedral Arcade is a heritage shopping arcade in Melbourne, Victoria, Australia.

The L-shaped arcade, connecting Swanston Street to Flinders Lane in the Melbourne central business district, was created in 1926 as part of the Nicholas Building, an early interwar palazzo "skyscraper" designed by Harry Norris.

The arcade retains most of its original features, notably the highly detailed leadlight arched ceiling and the shopfronts. The tiled floor is more recent. The leadlight ceiling was cleaned and repaired by Geoffrey Wallace Stained Glass in 2015.

The building with its arcade is listed on the Victorian Heritage Register.
