= USS Aspro =

Two submarines of the United States Navy have been named Aspro after the aspro, a fish found abundantly in the upper Rhone River.

- USS Aspro (SS-309), a Balao-class submarine, served during World War II.
- USS Aspro (SSN-648), a Sturgeon-class submarine, served during the Cold War.
