= Hendra (name) =

Hendra is a name of both Indonesian and Cornish origin. Notable people with the name include:

Surname:

- Lawrence Hendra, pictures and prints expert for BBC's Antiques Roadshow
- Imay Hendra (born 1970), Indonesian badminton player
- Tiffany Hendra (born 1971), American actress and television personality
- Tony Hendra (1941–2021), British actor and author

Given name:

- Hendra Aprida Gunawan (born 1982), Indonesian badminton player
- Hendra Bayauw (born 1993), Indonesian footballer
- Hendra Gunawan (1918–1983), Indonesian artist
- Hendra Ridwan (born 1985), Indonesian footballer
- Hendra Setiawan (born 1984), Indonesian badminton player
- Galang Hendra Pratama (born 1999), Indonesian motorcycle rider
