= Nicholas Building =

Building in Melbourne, Australia

Coordinates: 37.8167°S 144.9668°E

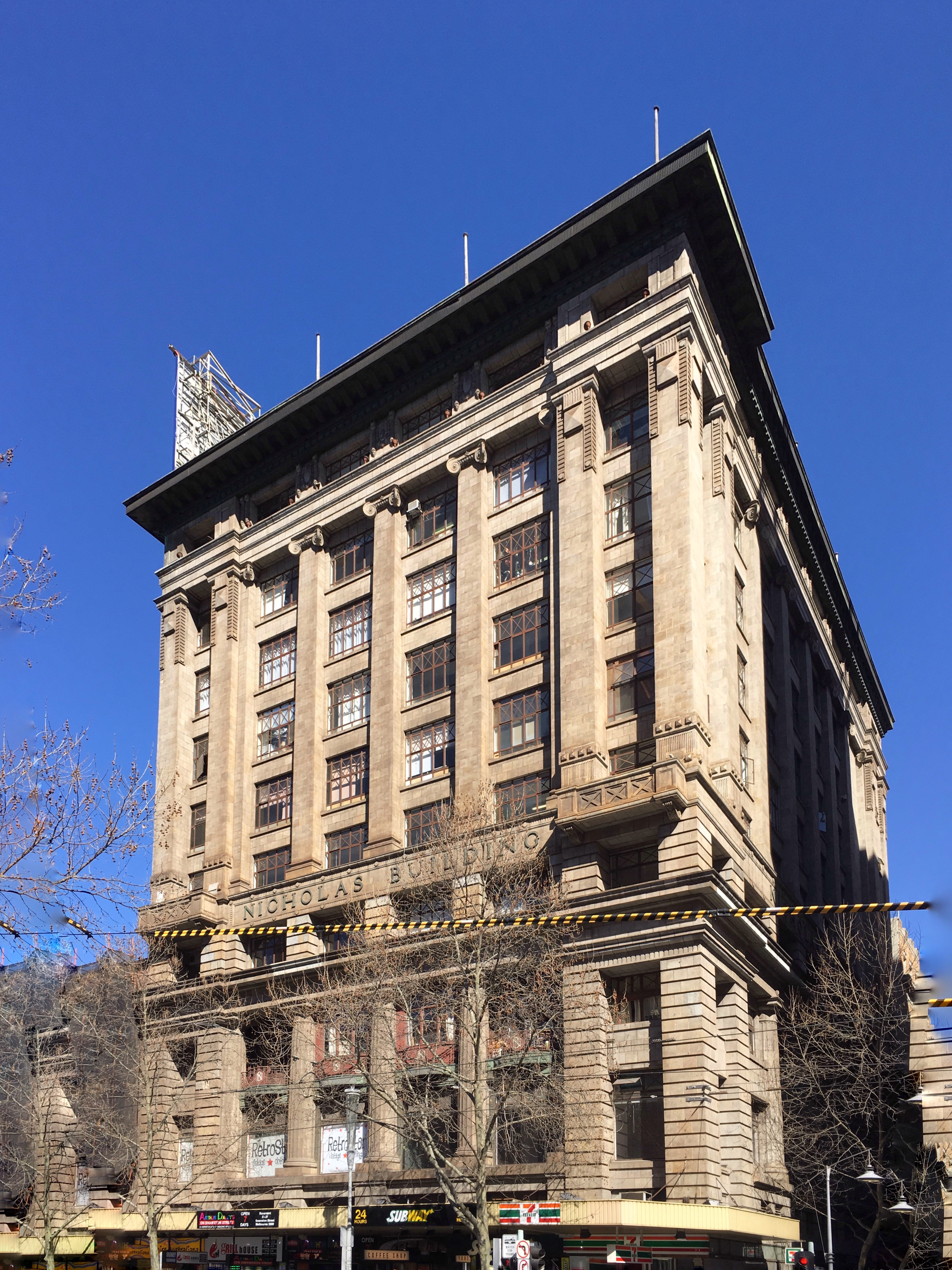
The Nicholas Building in 2018.

The Nicholas Building is a landmark historic office and retail building located at 37 Swanston St, at the intersection of Swanston Street and Flinders Lane, in the Melbourne central business district, Victoria, Australia. Designed by architect Harry Norris and completed in 1926, it is the grandest example in Melbourne of what is known as 'Commercial Palazzo' style, featuring a solid base, vertical middle floors, and a large cornice. It has housed a range of small businesses, and is now known for its creative industry tenants such as fashion designers and artists and specialist retailers. It had the longest operating manual lifts in the city, and the ground floor Cathedral Arcade is one of the most notable 1920s interiors in the city. The building is listed by the National Trust and by Heritage Victoria.

== History ==
The Nicholas family, headed by Alfred Nicholas, built their fortune on the production of Aspro, a replacement for the German-made aspirin when it became unavailable during World War I. The Nicholas company never occupied the building; it was instead built as a speculative office building development. It was completed in 1926, and designed by architect Harry Norris. Norris established his architecture practice in the building, remaining until his retirement in 1955. The building has two main facades, the one to Swanston Street the most imposing. On its completion it was hailed as a 'modern skyscraper'.

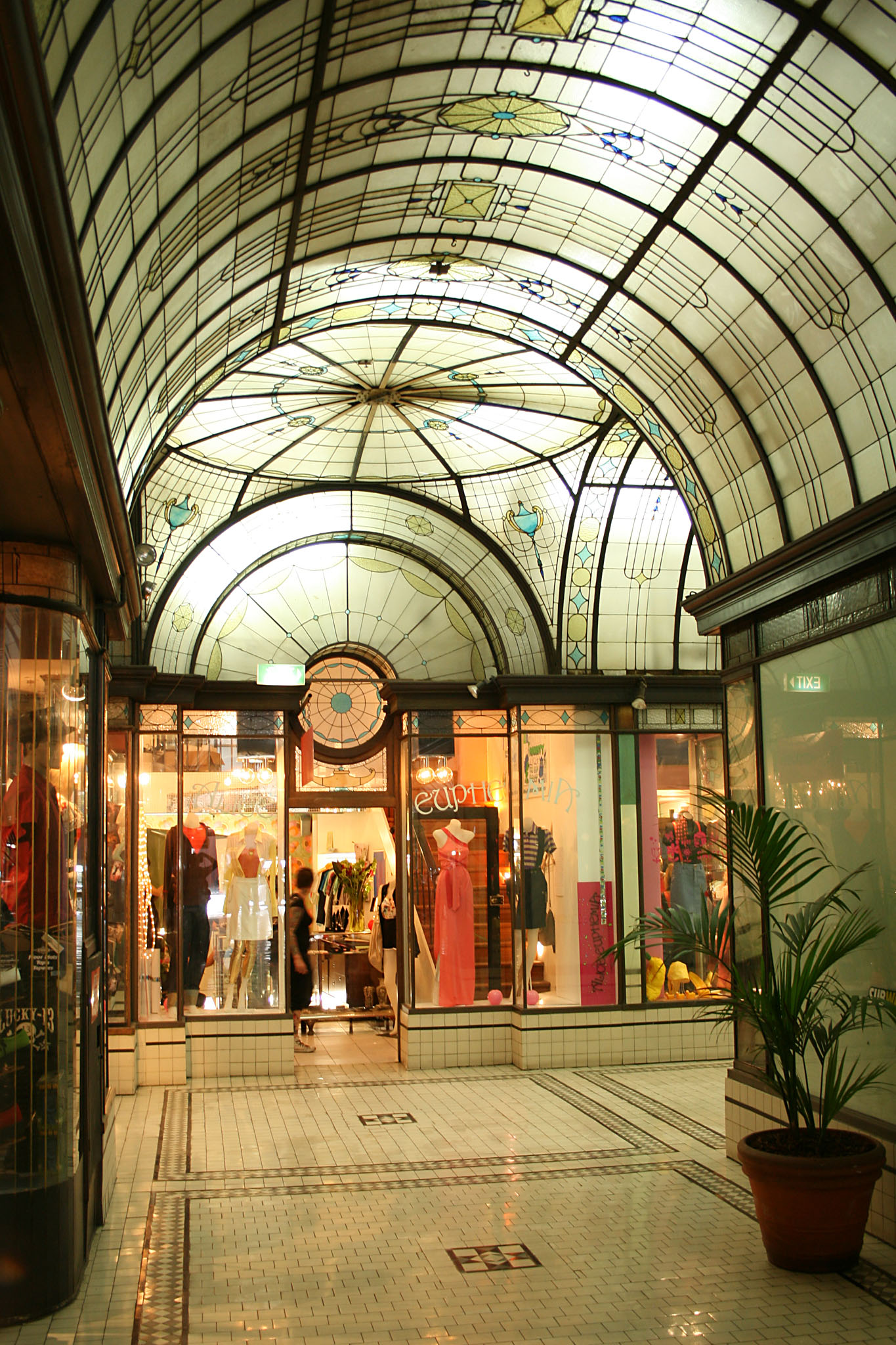
Cathedral Arcade in 2007

The Cathedral Arcade, named after the Cathedral opposite, is L-shaped, with the lifts and stairs to the upper floors opening off it. The arcade features the original finely detailed shopfronts, and a leadlight barrel vaulted glass ceiling. The first floor was also developed as shops, complete with leadlight shop fronts matching those of the ground floor.

From 1926 to 1967 a Coles department store occupied the basement and part of the ground floor. In 1939, a five level Victorian era building to the south was replaced by a lower three storey extension, also designed by Norris, extending the area of the Coles store. Some time after this, the rooms above on that side, which only opened onto the internal light well, were opened up with windows to the south. From the 1950s on, that wall sported various painted or neon signs, with larger ones supported on a framework on the roof, all removed by 2020.

The building was home to various businesses, at first many associated with the Flinders Lane garment trade, and later commercial artists, medical practitioners and architects. By the 1990s the small rooms and relatively cheap rent attracted creative industry practitioners and specialist retailers, some of whom still serve the fashion industry, and it became renowned as one of Melbourne's 'vertical lanes'.

Valerie (Vali) Myers (1930-2003) had a studio on the seventh floor from 1995 until her death in 2003; she was a dancer and artist who moved to Paris in 1949 and lived and worked in Positano and New York before returning to Melbourne in 1993.

The 2003 novel Shantaram, by one of Australia's most wanted fugitives Gregory David Roberts, was written in the building. In 2003, a stencil, believed by UK artist Banksy, was painted on the building, on the corner of Swanston Street and Flinders Lane. A piece of plastic was put up over the work to protect it from the elements but it was later painted over by city council workers, upsetting the art community.

Before undergoing modernisation in 2012, the Nicholas Building was home to the last manually operated lift in Melbourne.

In 1964 it was purchased by the Anglican Church as an investment, who then sold it in the 1970s to a consortium of families from the wealthy suburb of Toorak, who put it on the market in June 2021. This led the Nicholas Building Association to campaign to raise funds in order to rescue the current use of the building as a creative hub from commercial development.

As a result, some artists in the community have raised awareness that the lack of protection for the use of buildings can have adverse effects in protecting heritage:

"However, usage is rarely safeguarded - heritage protection is mainly concerned about the look of a building. And mainly concerned about how it looks from the street. Interiors are mostly disregarded unless there's some aspect about it that has gathered some public fame. In other words, heritage protection is superficial at best and fairly ineffective in protecting what is worth protecting. Safeguarding a city entails much more than protecting the 'decorative' features of a façade."

A reported sale to a social enterprise in 2022 did not appear to eventuate by 2023.

In 2017 the 1939 Coles extension was demolished along with many other buildings to the south as part of the development of Town Hall Station, part of the Melbourne Metro project. In December 2022 a 10-storey office development to be built over the station site was announced.

== Architecture ==
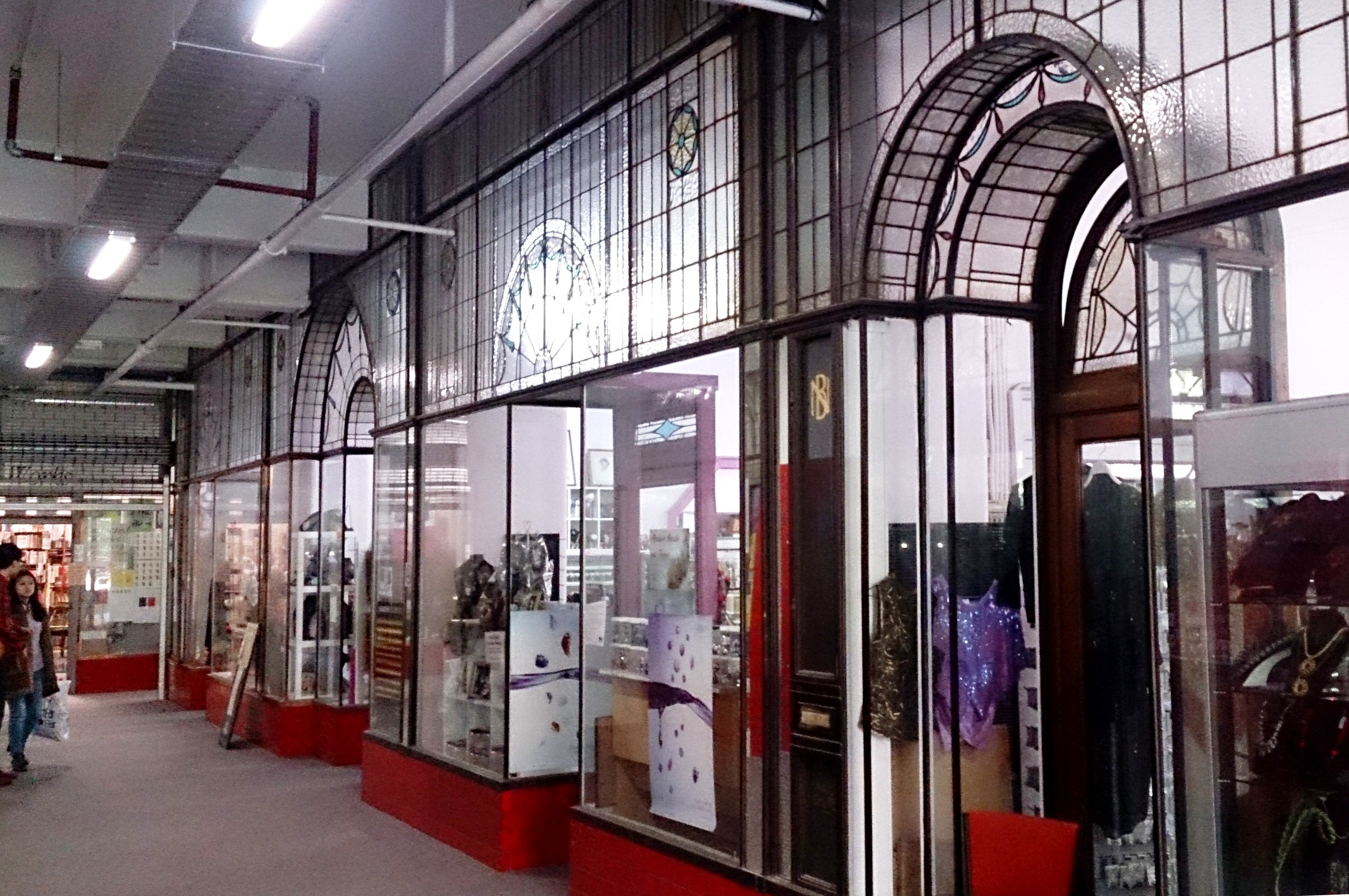
Shopfronts in the first floor 'arcade' in 2015

The Nicholas Building was built to the then height limit of 132 ft (40.3 m), in force from 1916 to 1957. Following the style of American 'Beaux Arts' or Classical revival, the exterior has a base of four floors, supported by piers and Doric columns, while giant order Ionic pilasters divide the upper façade into bays, and the top is defined by a wide cornice. The corners are given added emphasis with solid piers projecting slightly forward.

The main facades are clad in grey terracotta faience designed to give the appearance of stone, manufactured by Wunderlich as ‘Granitex’, chosen for its durability and ease of maintenance, since it was promoted as able to 'self-clean'. The rear and south facades are unadorned.

A steel-frame structure was used for the first three floors with reinforced concrete on the upper floors, a lower cost structure where space was not a priority. The offices above the second floor are planned around a light well that runs down to the roof of the second floor.

== In popular culture ==
The building is referenced in the song "Elevator Operator" on Australian musician Courtney Barnett's 2015 album Sometimes I Sit and Think, and Sometimes I Just Sit.

== See also ==
- Cathedral Arcade
- Burnham Beeches
- Architecture of Melbourne
