= George Coles (businessman) =

Australian businessman (1885-1977)

Sir George Coles
- Born: George James Coles; 28 March 1885; Jung Jung, Victoria, Australia
- Died: 4 December 1977 (aged 92); Australia
- Occupations: Entrepreneur; retailer; company director; benefactor; soldier
- Known for: G. J. Coles & Co. Ltd
- Parents: George W. Coles (father); Elizabeth Mary née Scouler (mother)
- Relatives: Jim Coles; Sir A. W. Coles; David Henry Coles; Sir K. F. Coles; Sir E. B. Coles; Sir N. C. Coles
- Military career
- Allegiance: Australia
- Branch: Army
- Service years: 1917–1918
- Rank: Lance corporal
- Service number: 3369
- Unit: 60th Australian Infantry Battalion
- Conflicts: World War I

Sir George James Coles CBE (28 March 1885 – 4 December 1977), known as G.J. Coles, was an Australian entrepreneur who founded what became the Coles Group, a large retail shopping empire and chain store group in Australia.

== Early life ==
Coles was born as the first of ten children in Jung Jung, Victoria (now Jung, between Horsham and Murtoa) to shopkeeper George W. Coles and Elizabeth Mary Coles (née Scouler (Note: Other sources have Scoular, Souter, but may be discounted.)). His mother died following the birth of her eleventh child in 1900. Coles's father re-married, to Ann Cameron "Annie" Topp of Buninyong, on 20 August 1902.

George Coles was educated at Beechworth College.

== Career ==
George worked in Melbourne and the country for a few years. In 1910, he purchased his father's shop in the Victorian town of St James, measuring 6.1 by 5.5 metres (20 ft × 18 ft), for A£4,500. He then moved to Wilmot, Tasmania (c.30 kilometres (19 mi) south of Ulverstone), where he opened yet another shop. George took trips to the United States and the United Kingdom to learn about the American and British methods of retailing.

In 1914, with brothers, Jim and Arthur, and capital of £2,000, George opened his first shop in Smith Street, Collingwood (Note: George's home address was 28 Smith Street, possibly connected to the shop, but one reference gives the shop address as 288 Smith Street.) with the slogan "Nothing over a shilling", which in the early 1930s became "Nothing over 2/6d". (Note: As the basic wage was then £2/11/8d per week or 1/4d per hour, the modern equivalent might be "Nothing over $30" but such comparisons have limited value.)

His brother, Arthur, enlisted with the First Australian Imperial Force (AIF) shortly after Australia joined World War I. Arthur was twice wounded and was repatriated in 1916. George enlisted with the 60th Battalion of the AIF in March 1917 and fought in France as a lance corporal, demobilised in November 1918. Brothers, Jim and David, were killed during the conflict. Their uncle Jim helped manage the store during their absences.

After the war, George and his brothers, Edgar, Kenneth and Norman, set about developing the Coles Group. In 1924 they opened the store at Deva House, Bourke Street, Melbourne. In 1927 they had nine stores, all in Victoria. In that year they first offered shares to the public. In 1938 G. J. Coles & Co. Ltd. had 86 stores across Australia and 168 in 1953. In 1976 the company had 576 stores and a staff of over 36,000.

George Coles was managing director of G. J. Coles & Co from 1923 to 1931, when, after some illness he handed the leadership role to Arthur, but remained as chairman of the board, despite very public opposition to his autocratic style, until 1956. He maintained membership on the board until 1976, when he retired.

=== Philanthropy ===
With his role in the company reduced, George Coles devoted time and energy to philanthropic and political causes. He served as a director of The Alfred Hospital and, from 1933, as its honorary treasurer. He was an active member of St John's Anglican Church in Toorak. He was an active member of Rotary and president of its Melbourne club in 1934. He helped found the Institute of Public Affairs, and was its president in 1965.

With fellow businessmen, R. M. Williams and Samuel Hordern, Coles helped found the Equestrian Federation of Australia in 1951 to support Australia's 1956 Olympic Games equestrian team. Because of quarantine restrictions, these events were held in Stockholm, Sweden rather than the Olympic host city, Melbourne.

He served on the board of the Victorian Hospitals and Charities Commission from 1935 and was a director of the National Bank of Australia. He was an active member of the Royal Melbourne Golf Club and the Peninsula Golf Club, including a four-year term as president, the Athenaeum Club, the Victoria Racing Club and the Melbourne Cricket Club.

A Christian, Coles paid for Billy Graham's crusade to be publicly broadcast across Australian television; he enabled the Brotherhood of St Laurence to set up a retirement village at Seaford by purchasing the land; he financially supported Christian education in public and government schools; he helped fund a hall at his local church; and he assisted many charities and societies, such as the Boy Scouts and the Corps of Commissionaires, a support and welfare organisation for war veterans who have the responsibility for the Shrine of Remembrance.

=== Honours ===
Coles was appointed a Commander of the Order of the British Empire in 1942 in recognition of service to philanthropy. He was appointed a Knight Bachelor in 1957, in recognition of his service as a director of the National Bank.

Australia's National Portrait Gallery holds a portrait of Sir George by William Dargie, together with portraits of his brothers, Sir Arthur, Sir Edgar, Sir Kenneth, and Sir Norman, also painted by Dargie.

== Brothers ==
Coles' brothers were:

- James Scouler Coles (1 July 1888 – 10 August 1916), known as Jim Coles, was educated at Geelong College, helped brother George with his first store, joined the AIF in August 1915, served in France with the (2nd Division) 4th Field Artillery Brigade during World War I and was killed in action.
- Sir Arthur William Coles (6 August 1892 – 14 June 1982), known as A. W. Coles, joined the 6th Battalion in August 1914. He was twice wounded in action (at Gallipoli and in France) and was repatriated in 1916. He momentarily displaced George as chairman in 1936 in a coup and was made managing director. He was elected Lord Mayor of Melbourne in 1938 and re-elected twice. He was appointed to a number of highly public organisations and was knighted in 1960.
- David Henry Coles (July 1894 – 20 October 1917) had little to do with the business; he moved to Wilmot, Tasmania with his father after George took over the business. He served in Belgium with the (4th Division Artillery) 10th Field Artillery Brigade during World War I and died of wounds.
- Sir (Kenneth) Frank Coles (19 April 1896 – 2 April 1985), known as K. F. Coles, was knighted in 1957. He retired from the board of G. J. Coles & Coy. Ltd in 1976.
- Sir Edgar Barton Coles (3 June 1899 – 19 February 1981), known as E. B. Coles, first secretary of G. J. Coles & Coy. Ltd, drove much of the company's expansion and entry into television advertising. He was knighted in 1959.
- Sir Norman Cameron Coles (17 September 1907 – 24 November 1989), known as N. C. Coles, was born to George (senior)'s second wife, Ann Cameron, née Topp, and was mostly educated in Tasmania. He joined G. J. Coles & Coy. Ltd in 1924, was managing director between 1967 and 1975, and chairman of the board from 1968, and deputy chairman of K-mart (Australia) Ltd. from 1967. He was knighted in 1977.
