= Athenaeum Club, Melbourne =

Gentlemen's club in Melbourne, Australia

Coordinates: 37°48′51.99″S 144°58′15.39″E

Athenaeum Club
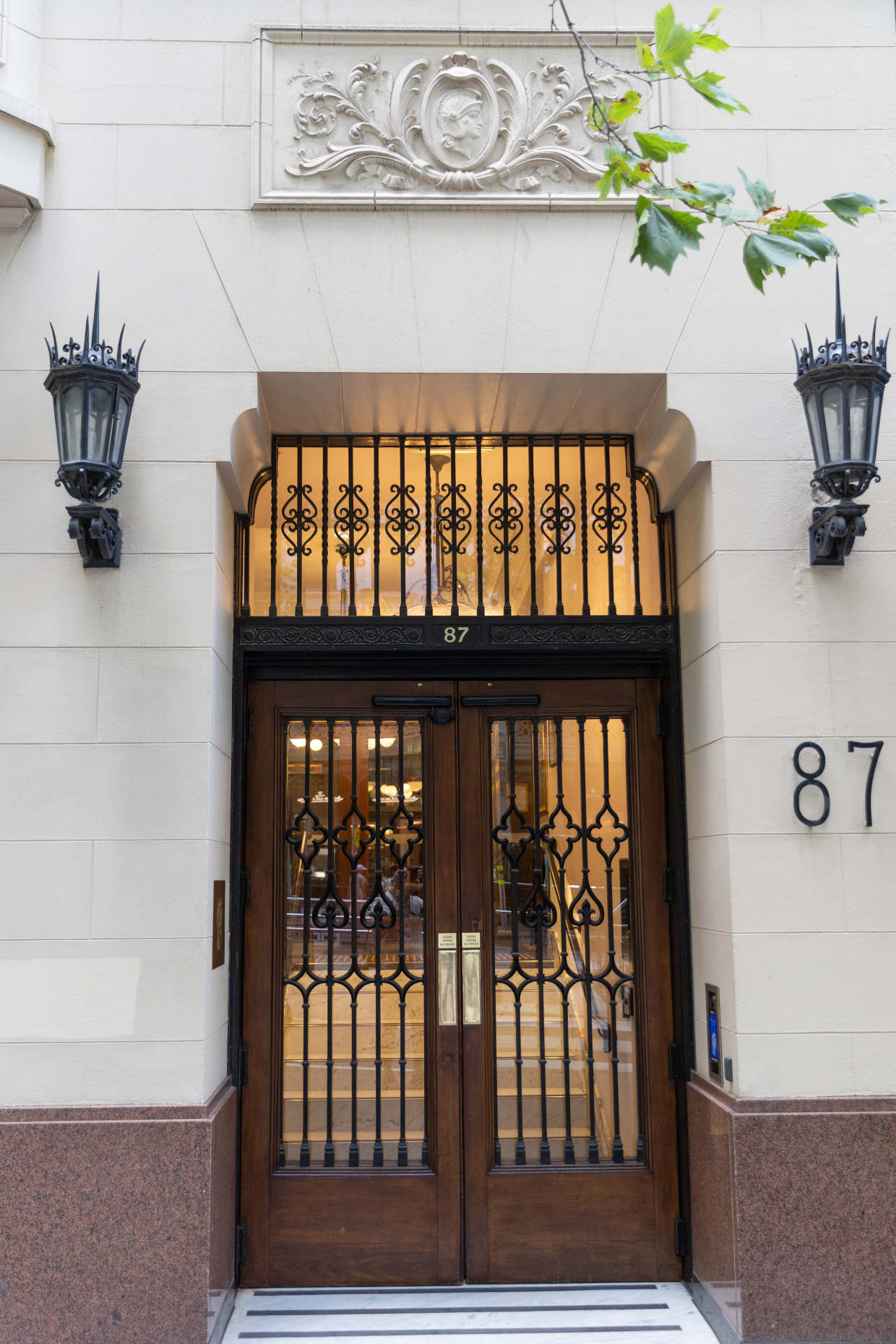
- Formation: 1868
- Location: 87 Collins Street, Melbourne

The Athenaeum Club is a private social club established in 1868 and located at 87 Collins Street in Melbourne, Australia. It celebrated its 150th anniversary in 2018.

It is known to be a powerful institution with quiet influence on the social fabric of the city. The club's membership is men-only and it is regarded as one of the most discrete and prestigious gentlemen's clubs in the country. Its membership list has long been seen to be representative of the Melbourne Establishment along with the eponymous Melbourne Club.

Admission is via invitation only and a substantial process of vetting is conducted on potential candidates upon him being proposed, seconded and refereed by current members. The club has a policy to not engage with the media regarding any speculations about the institution or its members.

The club maintains reciprocal arrangements with other elite clubs in Australia and major cities internationally including in London, New York and Paris.
