= Lanes and arcades of Melbourne =

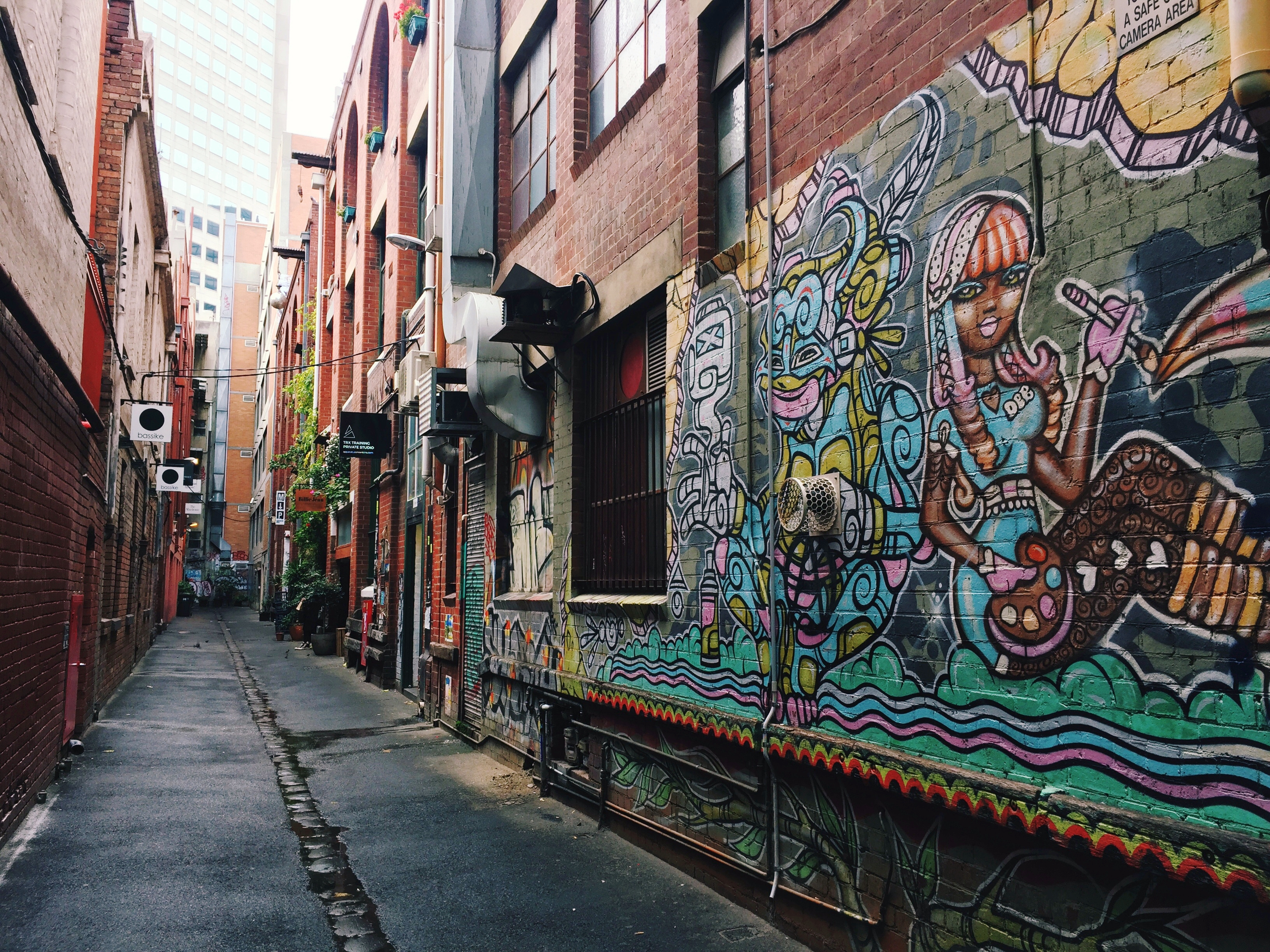
Rankins Lane

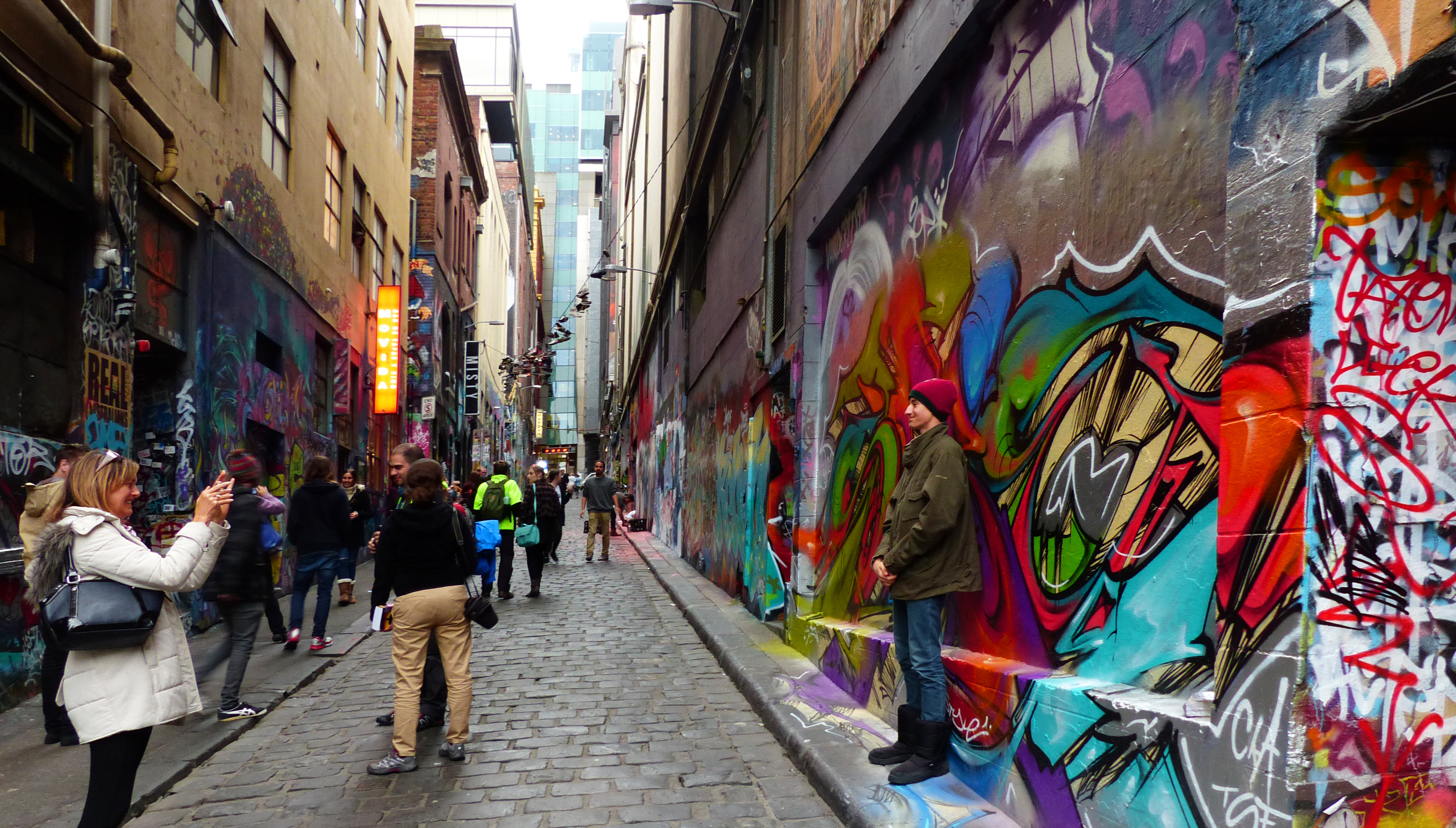
Hosier Lane

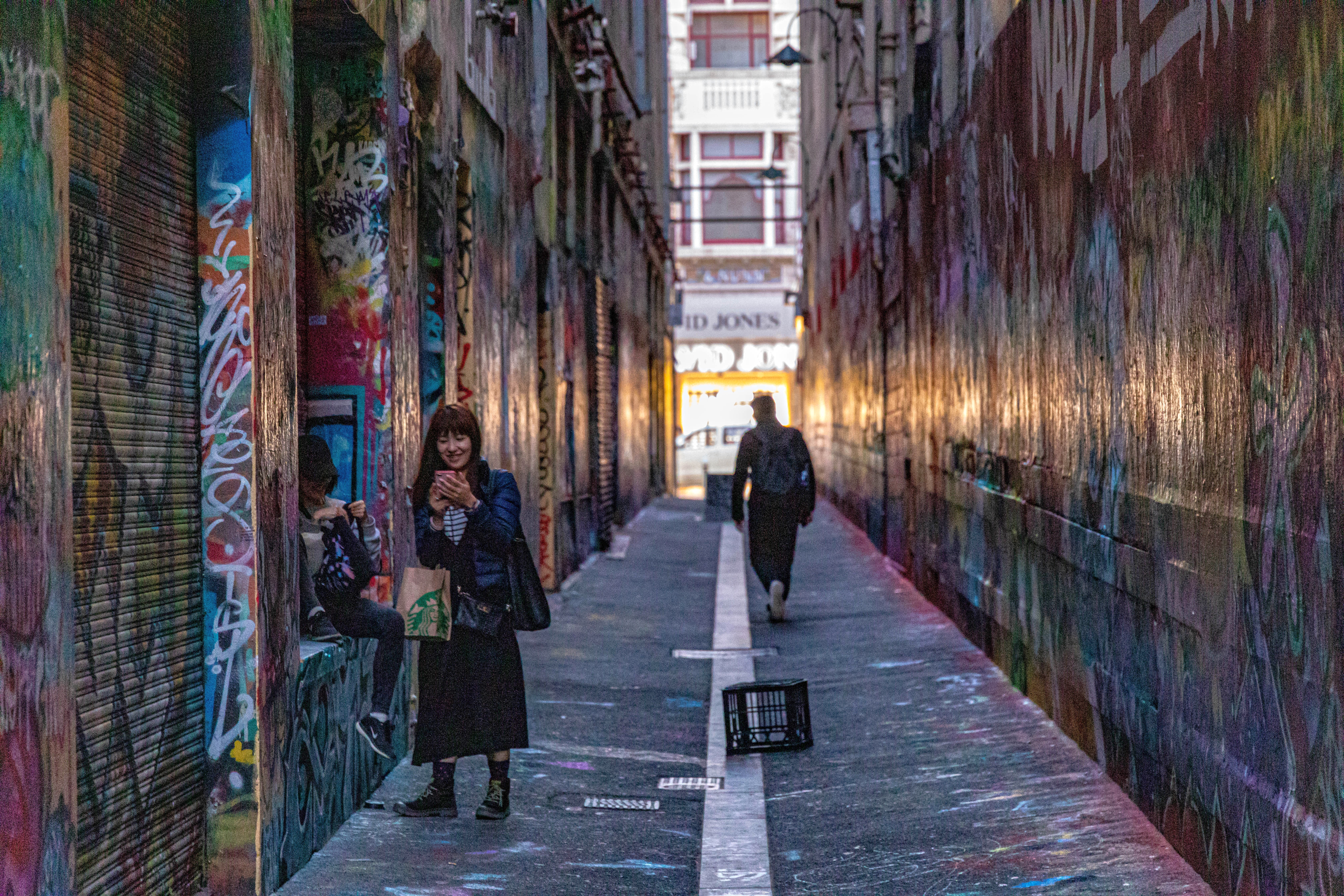
Union Lane

The Melbourne central business district in Australia is home to numerous lanes and arcades. Often called "laneways", these narrow streets and pedestrian paths date mostly from the Victorian era, and are a popular cultural attraction for their cafes, bars and street art.

The city's oldest laneways are a byproduct of Melbourne's original urban plan, the 1837 Hoddle Grid, and were designed as access routes to service properties fronting the CBD's major thoroughfares. By the 1850s gold rush, Melbourne had over one hundred lanes, some of which became associated with the city's criminal underbelly, notably those in the Little Lon district. Melbourne's shopping arcades, among the best known being the Block Arcade and the Royal Arcade, reached a peak of opulence during the late Victorian era. Since the 1990s, many lanes in Melbourne have become pedestrianised and undergone gentrification. Recognised today for their heritage value, they frequently feature in tourism promotions, and attract visitors from throughout Australia and the world. A number of laneways, such as Hosier Lane, are street art hotspots, and referred to as "laneway galleries".

St Jerome's Laneway Festival, often referred to simply as Laneway, is a popular music festival that began in 2004 in Melbourne's laneways.

== ACDC Lane ==
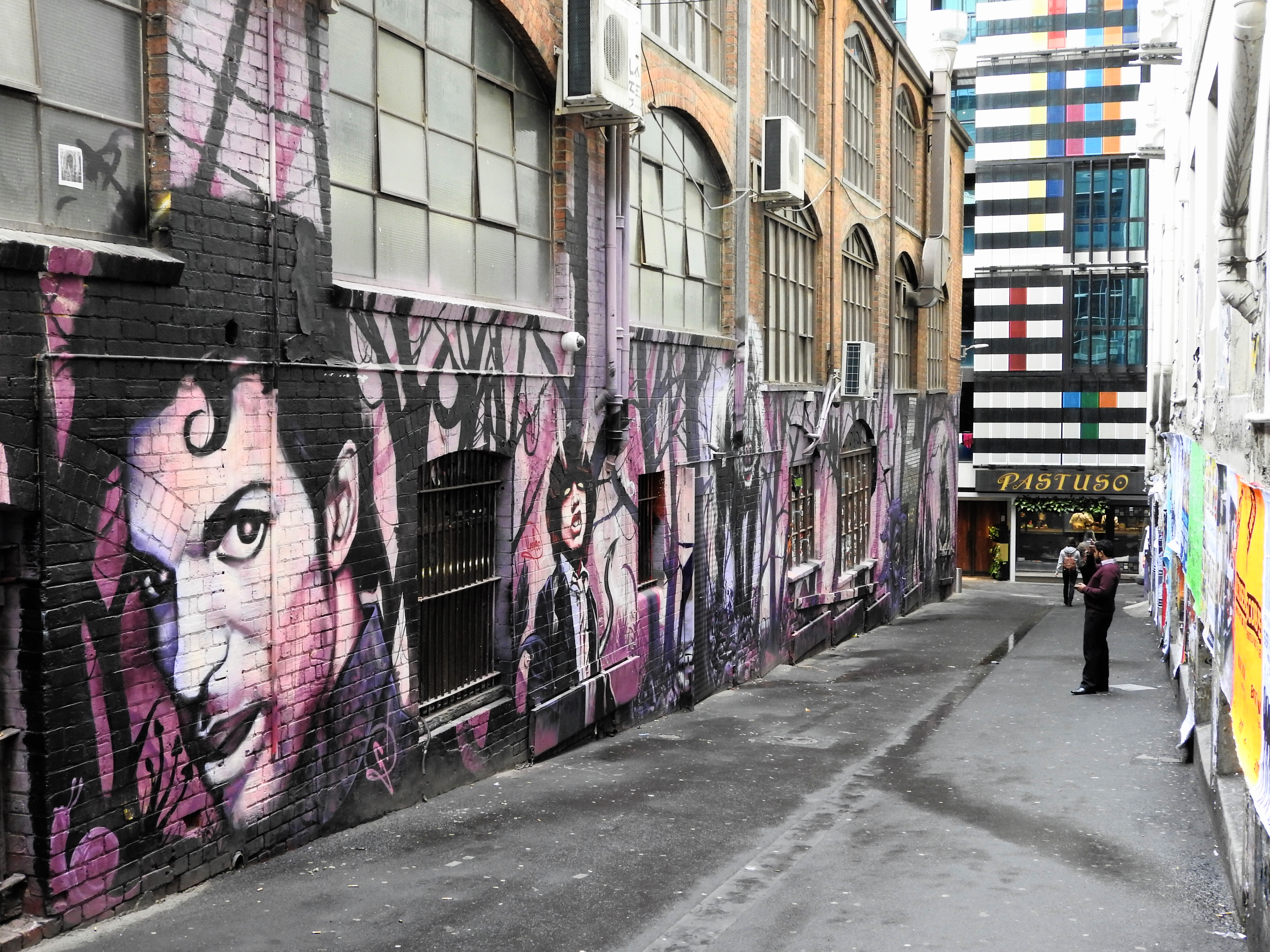
ACDC Lane

ACDC Lane is a short, narrow laneway, running south from Flinders Lane between Exhibition Street and Russell Street.

The street was formerly called Corporation Lane, but was renamed on 1 October 2004 as a tribute to Australian rock band AC/DC. The Melbourne City Council's vote to rename the street was unanimous. The trademark lightning bolt or slash ("/") used to separate the AC and the DC in the band's name contravened the naming policy of the Office of the Registrar of Geographic Names, so the punctuation was omitted on the street sign.

Melbourne's Lord Mayor John So launched ACDC Lane with the words, "As the song says, there is a highway to hell, but this is a laneway to heaven. Let us rock." Bagpipers then played "It's a Long Way to the Top (If You Wanna Rock 'n' Roll)." One month after the renaming, a lightning bolt was erected above and below the street sign.

Corporation Lane was chosen for renaming in part because the band filmed the music video for "It's a Long Way to the Top (If You Wanna Rock 'n' Roll)" on Melbourne's Swanston Street. ACDC Lane is near Swanston Street.

Other factors given include: AC/DC's status as cultural ambassadors for Australia, the band's ties to Melbourne, and the lane's position in the city's bar district.

== Amphlett Lane ==
Amphlett Lane is a lane off Little Bourke Street. It was renamed in honour of Chrissy Amphlett in 2014. Christina Joy Amphlett (/æmflət/; 25 October 1959 – 21 April 2013) was an Australian singer, songwriter and actress who was the frontwoman of the Australian rock band Divinyls. Amphlett died in 2013 of breast cancer and complications from multiple sclerosis. The laneway is nestled behind the Princess Theatre on Spring Street and the rear of the Palace on Bourke, and is, said Cr Doyle, "emblematic, being at the back of two theatres where Chrissy so famously performed".

== Bank Place ==
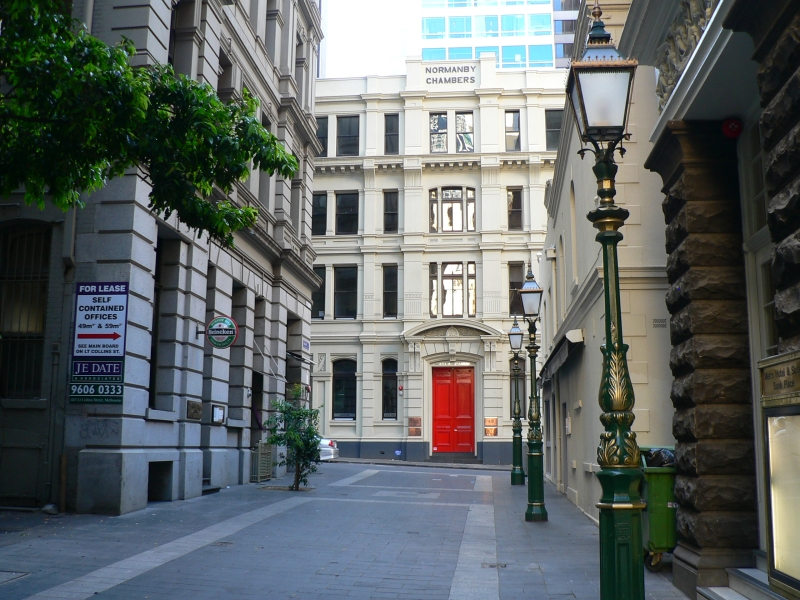
Bank Place

Bank Place is a short, narrow laneway, running south from Little Collins Street between Queen Street and William Street.

Located in the heart of the financial sector, Bank Place (which incorporates several smaller lanes, such as Mitre Lane) is an oasis of heritage pre-war buildings dating from the 1860s through to the 1920s. Looking north, a vista is framed by Normanby Chambers.

The precinct is subject to heritage restrictions, and some of the significant buildings include:

- Mitre Tavern, historic pub established in 1868 and remodelled in the Queen Anne style between 1900 and 1910. Mitre Tavern was a popular 'bohemian' hangout for many of Australia's most prominent artists of the early twentieth century, alongside the neighbouring Savage Club.

Some significant buildings include 12–16 Bank Place was built 1884 – 85 for Australia's first baronet Sir William Clarke. His son, Sir Rupert Clarke's mistress Connie Waugh is said to have lived there. The Melbourne Savage Club purchased the building in 1923. The building is classified by the National Trust of Australia (Victoria). Stalbridge Chambers built in 1891 is on the corner of Little Collins. Charter House is another notable old building in the lane.

The lane also includes several ornate heritage lamp posts and bluestone alleys.

Bank Place is home to several popular bars and cafes which serve many of the nearby office workers. Many of the taller old buildings have been converted into loft style apartments.

== Bligh Place ==
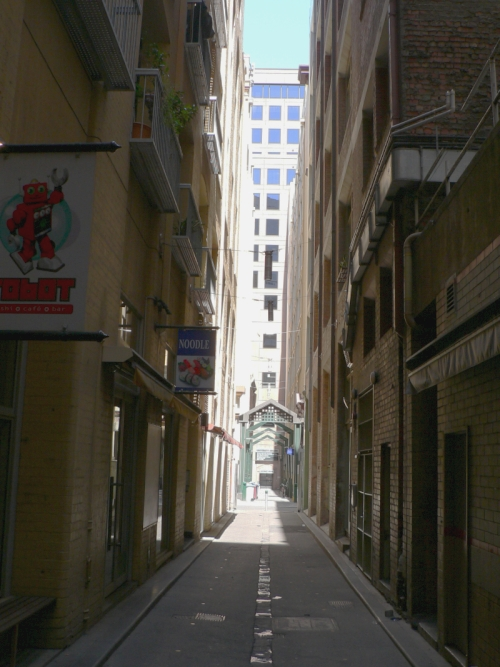
Bligh Place, looking South from the Deanery through to the University Arcade

Bligh Place is a short, quiet and narrow open laneway, running north from Flinders Lane between Elizabeth Street and Queen Street.

Located near Victoria University and the financial centre of Melbourne, Bligh Place is a short lane which connects across Flinders Lane with University Place and University Arcade through to Flinders Street. As such, it is popular with students and is currently flanked by some small noodle, sushi, cafes and wine bars.

The lane was developed in the 1990s following the location of Victoria University to the inner city campus and has a heritage building which was restored in the late 1990s on the eastern entrance and some converted warehouse lofts apartments. A vista is created by the Victoria University campus to the south on Flinders Street.

The lane is bitumen with a small strip blue stone cobbled gutter, has suspended overhead lighting and is unused by vehicular traffic.

== The Block Arcade ==
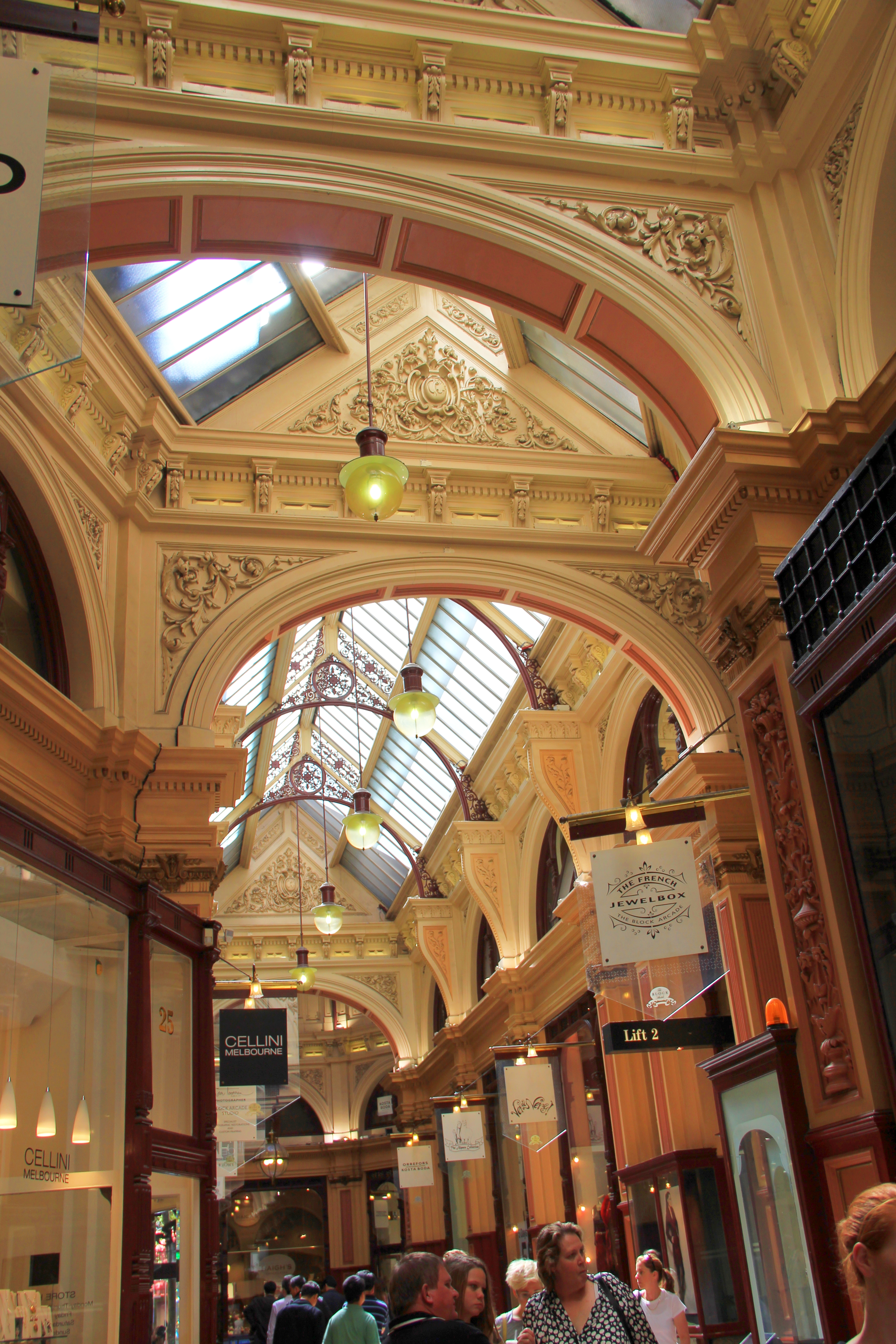
Block Arcade

The Block Arcade is a heritage shopping arcade that forms a short, narrow laneway, connecting Collins Street to Little Collins Street in the central business district of Melbourne. It is also connected to Elizabeth Street in the west, thus, forming a L-shaped arcade and connecting to Block Place through to the Royal Arcade.

Melbourne's Golden Mile heritage walk runs through the arcade.

The arcade which was erected between 1891 and 1893 was designed by architect David C. Askew whose brief was to produce something similar to the Galleria Vittoria in Milan. The result was one of Melbourne's most richly decorated interior spaces, replete with mosaic tiled flooring, glass canopy, wrought iron and carved stone finishings. The exterior façade of the six-storey office has near identical facades on Collins and Elizabeth Streets and is one of Australia's best surviving examples of the Victorian Mannerist style.

The arcade was formerly known as "Carpenter's Lane"; however, the precinct was widely known as "The Block". Once the works were complete, local shopkeepers successfully petitioned to have it changed to its present name.

It is a significant Victorian era arcade and is on the Victorian Heritage Register. Along with Melbourne's other main arcade, the Royal Arcade, and Melbourne's lanes, it is a tourist icon of the city.

== Block Place ==
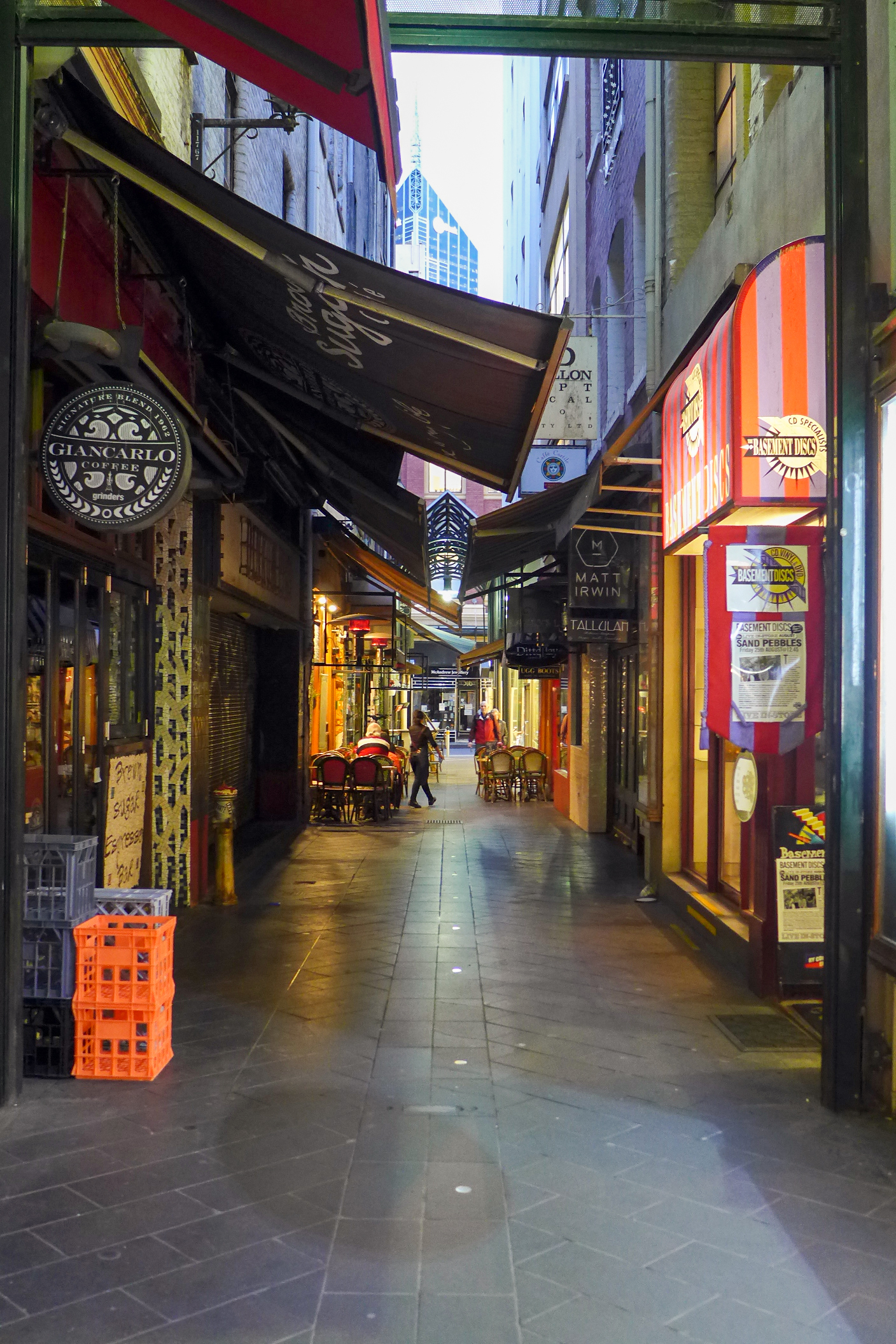
Block Place

Block Place is a short, narrow partially covered laneway, running south from Little Collins Street between Swanston Street and Elizabeth Street.

Block Place is a pedestrian only laneway that is trendy and popular with both Melbourne locals and tourists for its intimate alfresco cafes close to the shopping heart of Melbourne it is crowded with cafes and shops in a number of pre-war buildings. Cafe Segovia is one of a popular lunch destination and a popular record store is located in underground basements.

The lane joins with the heritage Block Arcade, a 19th-century covered shopping arcade. Block Arcade and Block Place form a T-shape running from Little Collins Street through to Collins Street and Elizabeth Street.

Royal Arcade is just across Little Collins and connects through to Bourke Street.

== Caledonian Lane ==
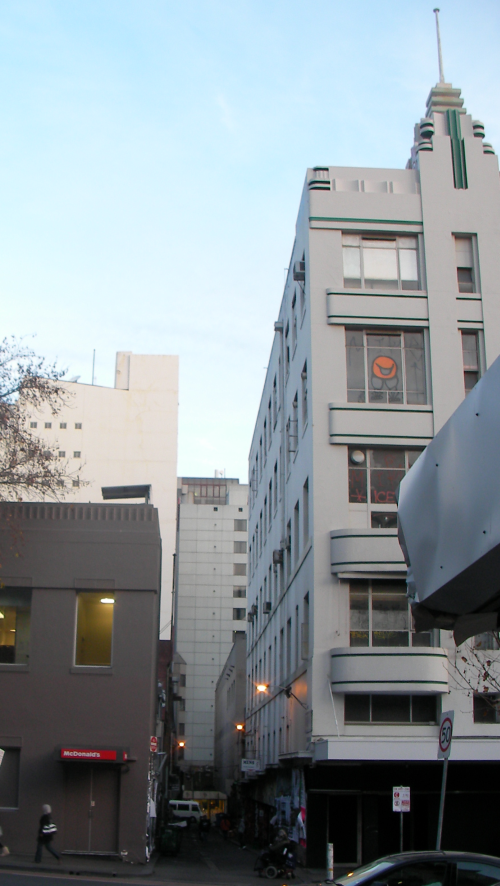
Caledonian Lane

Caledonian Lane is a short, quiet and narrow (4-metre wide) open laneway, running north from Little Bourke Street between Little Bourke Street and Lonsdale Street.

Caledonian Lane is most notable as the former home to the St Jerome's Laneway Festival. It is also notable due to controversial developments in 2009 involving the redevelopment of the Post Office precinct and Department Store precinct also involving the shutting down of both St Jerome's and the festival.

A consortium involving Myer and Colonial First State applied for exemption from the City of Melbourne Heritage Overlay to widen the lane by 4 metres to improve access for delivery trucks and in the process demolish the art deco landmark Lonsdale House in 2009. Permission was granted by both the City of Melbourne and the State planning minister Justin Madden MP on 24 July 2009 under controversial circumstances. In response to the demolition for the sake of lane widening, a preservation group called Save Lonsdale House formed in late 2009 despite protests the building was demolished in 2010 and the lane was widened.

Until 2004, Caledonian Lane was home to a number of small independent store owners, however the buildings were sold under vacant possession in 2007.

The lane is bitumen with a small strip blue stone cobbled gutter, has street lighting attached to Lonsdale House and is by both pedestrian and vehicular traffic, mainly delivery trucks. Caledonian Lane forms a vista toward both Loudon Place to the south and Drewery Lane to the north, both are almost directly opposite.

== Cathedral Arcade ==
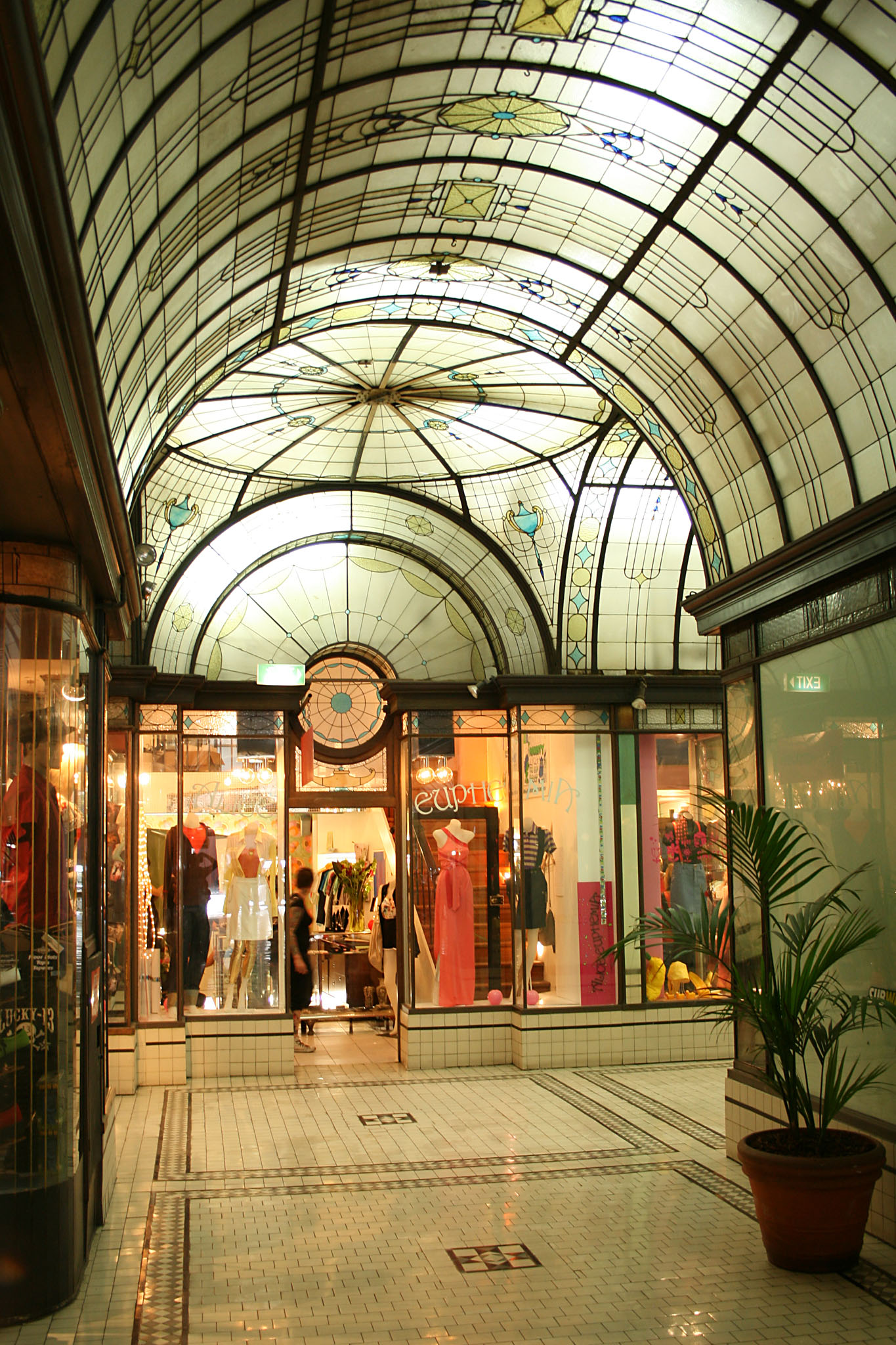
Cathedral Arcade

Cathedral Arcade is a heritage shopping arcade forming a short, narrow laneway, connecting Swanston Street to Flinders Lane. It is a T-shaped arcade, however one of the laneways terminates inside of the building.

The arcade is notable as it retains all of its original features. The arcade is fully covered by stained glass and leadlights, which forms a highly detailed arch leading to a central dome. The floors are decorated with ceramic tiles, and the shopfronts feature richly detailed wood panels.

The art deco arcade, which dates back to 1925 is part of the Nicholas Building designed by Harry Norris, is an early interwar palazzo skyscraper. The building itself, including the arcade is listed on the Victorian Heritage Register.

== Causeway Lane ==
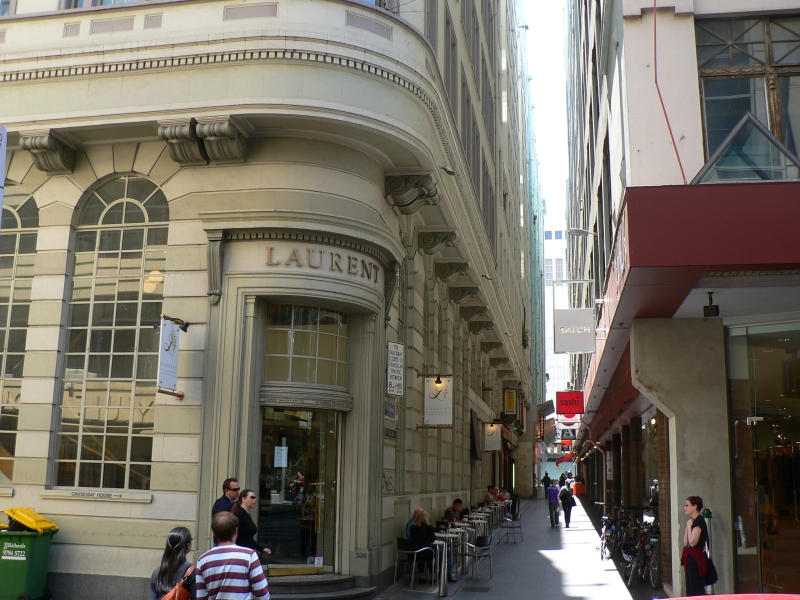
Causeway Lane

Causeway Lane (also known as The Causeway) is a short, quiet and narrow open laneway, running between Bourke Street Mall and Little Collins Street between Elizabeth Street and Swanston Street.

Located in the heart of the shopping precinct, the Causeway is currently flanked by some small boutique shops, indoor and outdoor cafes and sushi bars.

The lane is notable for the heritage listed former Union Bank a tall curved palazzo styled building constructed in the 1920s which has a mezzanine entrance at the corner of the lane. The building is now occupied by Laurent, an upmarket French patisserie.

The lane is bitumen and lined by the plain sides of some heritage buildings. It is closed to all vehicular traffic.

A vista is created at either end by the Emporium Melbourne on Bourke Street Mall and at the other by the postmodern facade of the Novotel on Collins.

== Centre Place ==
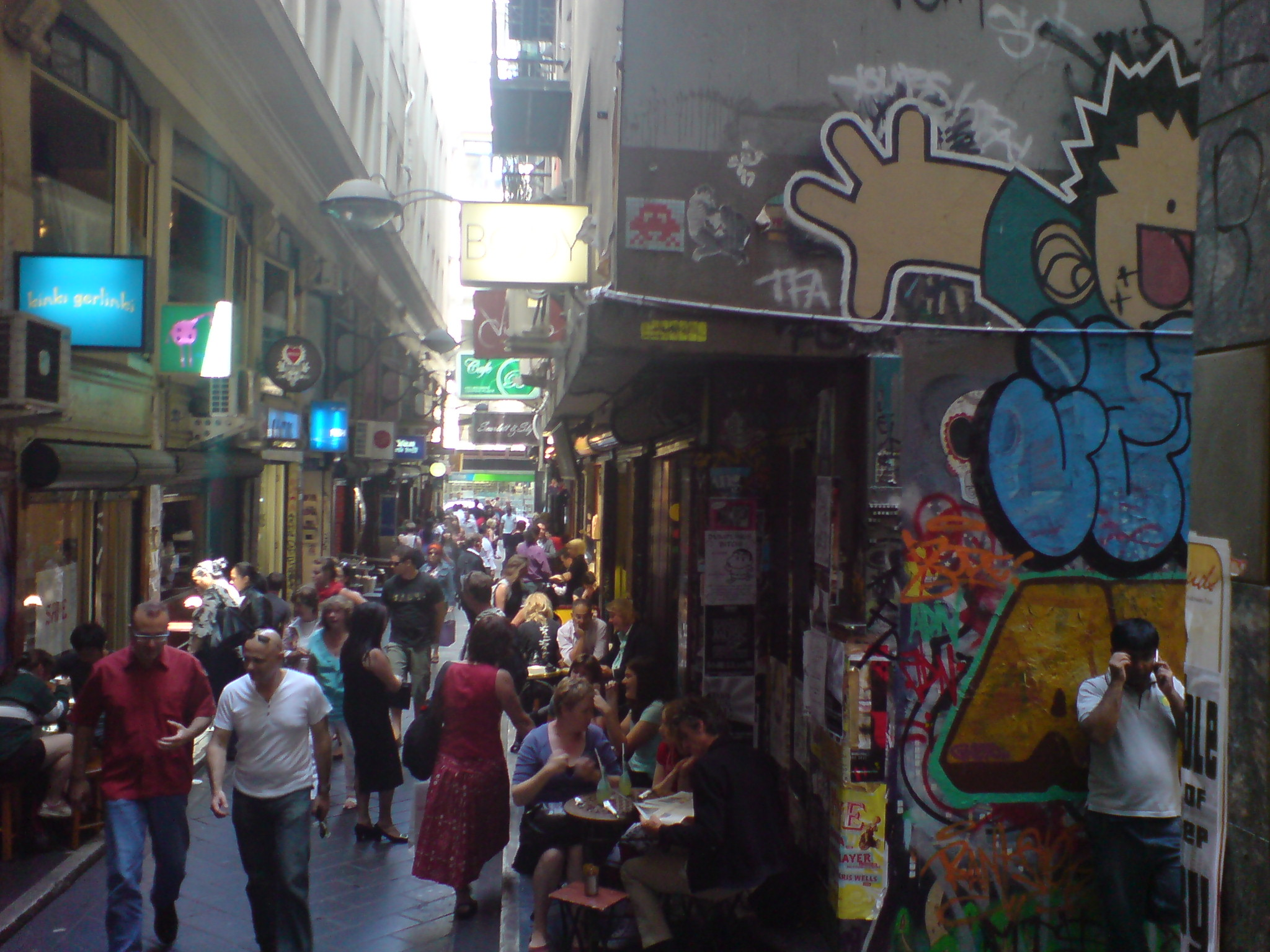
Centre Place

Centre Place is a busy laneway and arcade that runs between Flinders Lane and Collins Street.

The laneway is home to several bars, cafes, restaurants, boutiques, sushi bars and shops, as well as some of Melbourne's most iconic examples of street art and graffiti, particularly stencil graffiti, known as "City Lights". This precinct has been used in tourist promotion campaigns for the city.

== Corporation Lane ==
Many minor laneways in Melbourne are given the 'default' name "Corporation Lane". Often these "unnamed" laneways do not appear in street directories. Progressively some of these have been renamed to something 'novel', often commemorative. The most famous example is ACDC Lane. However several other examples exist, including Menzies Lane, East Melbourne.

Because of the number of 'Corporation Lanes', they are identified by number. For example, the lane that became Menzies Lane was previously listed as "Corporation Lane (No. 1161)". An article in The Age revealed that: "Of the 1556 laneways in the City of Port Phillip, for example, most are numbered but few are named."

== Croft Alley ==
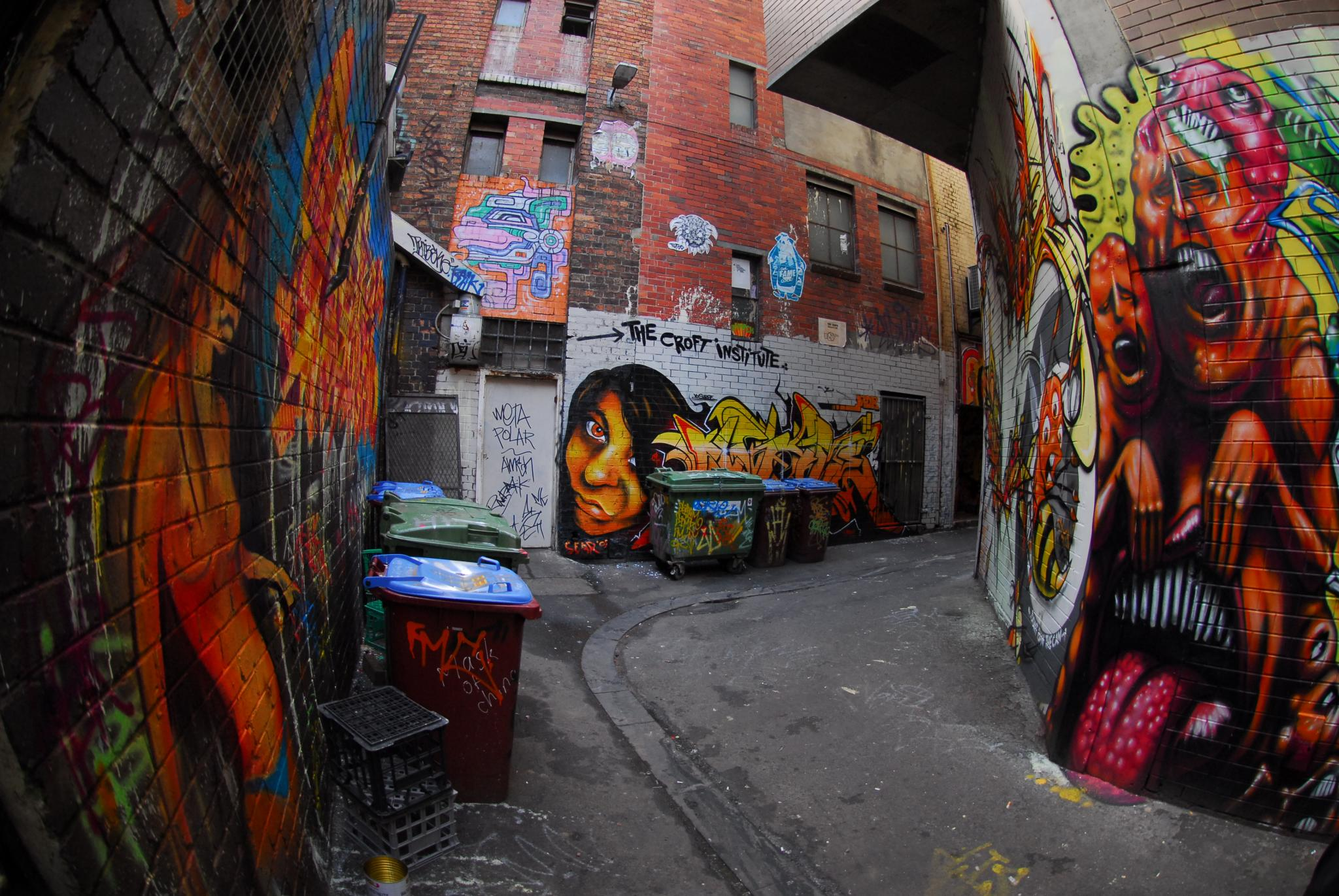
Croft Alley

Croft Alley is a narrow laneway in Chinatown, connecting Payne's Place and Little Bourke Street between Russell and Exhibition streets. In the 19th century, it also led to other laneways, but this section is now a dead end. Today it is primarily known for its bars and street art.

== Dame Edna Place ==
Dame Edna Place (formerly Brown Alley) is a lane off Little Collins Street. It was renamed in honour of Dame Edna Everage in 2007 and officially opened by the Lord Mayor John So. Dame Edna Place is opposite Royal Arcade and The Causeway, between the major roads, Elizabeth Street and Swanston Street; it was, until its renaming, a service alley for adjoining buildings. Dame Edna was not at the renaming ceremony but was represented by ten look-alike Dames.

== Degraves Street ==
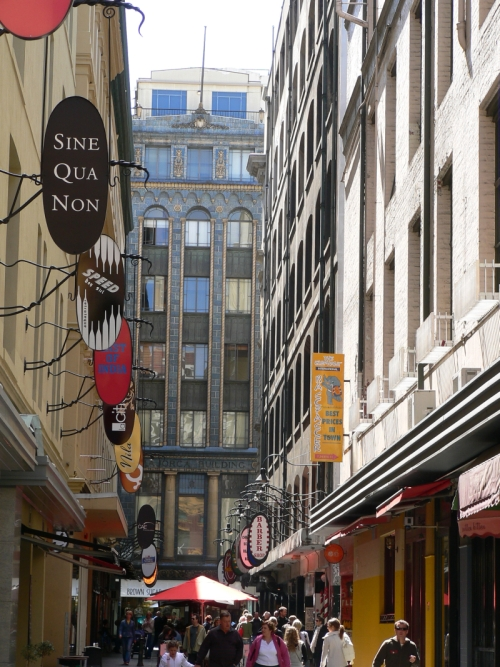
Degraves Street

Degraves Street is a short, narrow laneway, running north from Flinders Street to Flinders Lane.

It was named after Charles and William Degraves, pioneer merchants who settled in Melbourne from Hobart, Tasmania in 1849. William Degraves (1821–1883) was also a large-scale grazier and a member of Victoria's Legislative Council between 1860 and 1874.

The cobbled bluestone alley forms a busy alternative thoroughfare for commuters disembarking from Flinders Street station toward the shopping areas of The Block on Collins Street and Bourke Street Mall, loosely connecting with Centre Place, a similar lane just across Flinders Lane. The Degraves underpass was built in the 1950s, one of the few public works at the time, to allow pedestrians to get from Flinders Street Station to Degraves street rather than have to walk across busy Flinders Street. Degraves underpass is also home to Platform Artists Group, and frequently presents new works. Vehicles have only restricted access.

The lane features bars, cafes, and restaurants and many of the taller old buildings have been converted into loft style apartments in the 1990s, adding further life to the street.

Redevelopment of the Mutual Store in 2006 has further enhanced the lane with additional shops.

A vista up Degraves laneway is created by "Majorca House", an ornate 1930s building dressed in faience.

People use Degraves Street as a quick stop for a coffee before going to catch their train at Flinders Street station.

== Flinders Lane ==
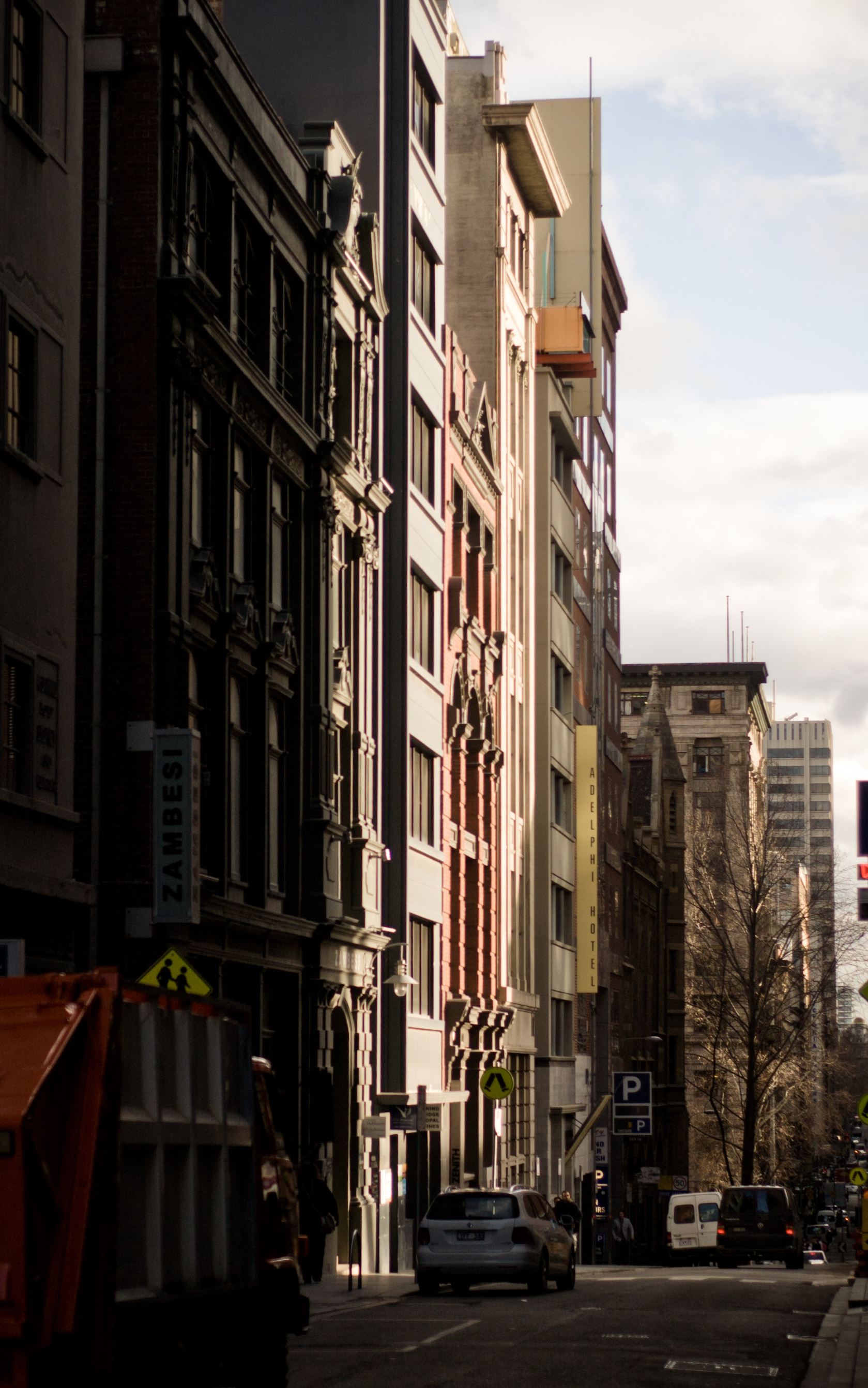
Flinders Lane

Flinders Lane is a minor street. The street runs parallel to and to the north of Flinders Street and as a narrow one way lane takes on the name of the wider main street. The street was the centre of Melbourne's rag trade for the middle decades of the 20th century and is still home to small boutique designers.

Despite the loss of some significant turn of the century buildings, it is now known for its "SoHo" atmosphere. Today, the area is home to many boutique hotels, "loft style" apartment conversions, cafes and bars as well as connecting with a number of smaller lanes, including Degraves Street, ACDC Lane, Manchester Lane and Centreway which weave their way through the city.

For a block between William Street and Market Street, Melbourne tram route 58 runs along Flinders Lane.

== Hardware Lane ==
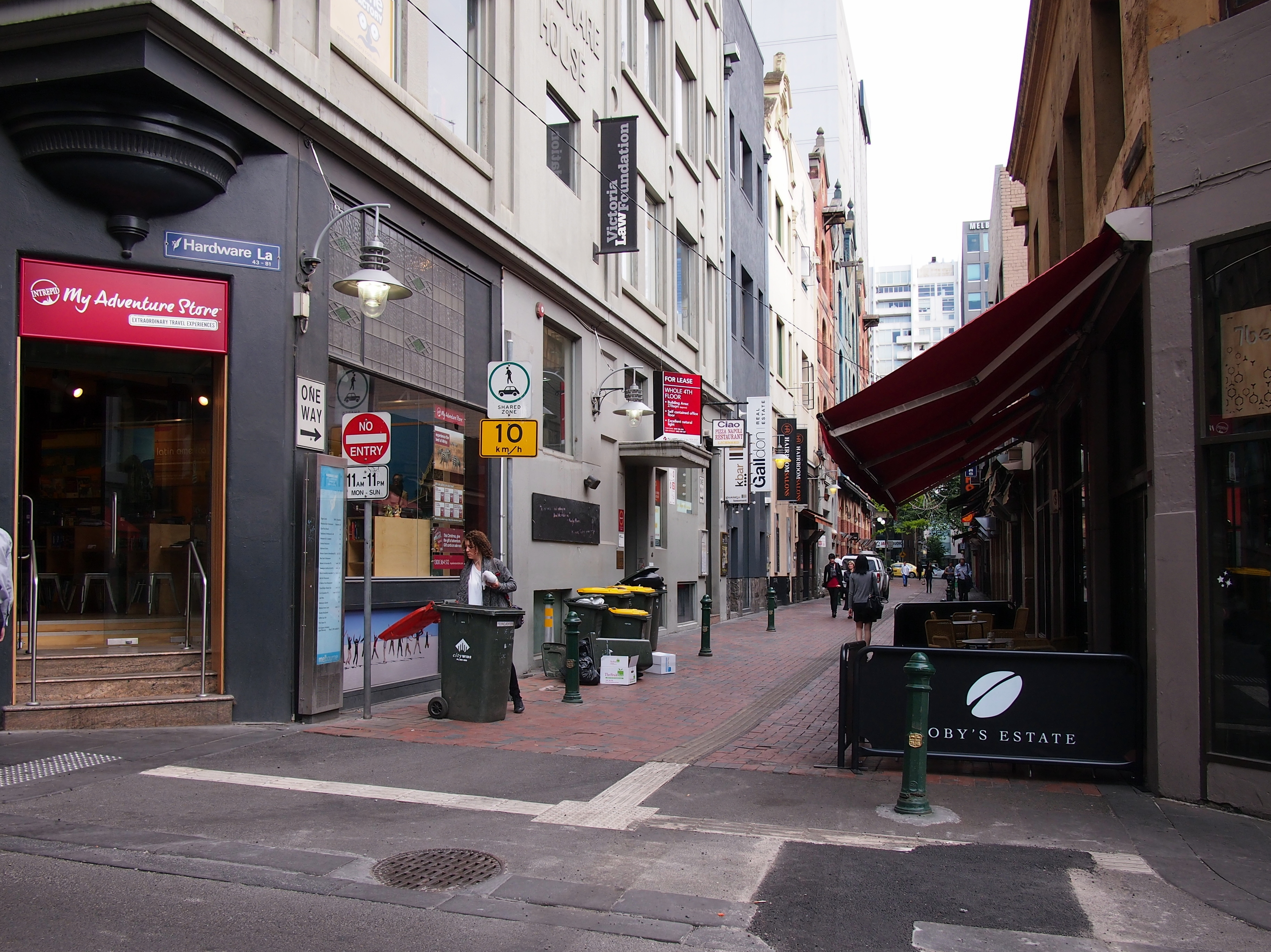
Hardware Lane

Hardware Lane runs roughly north–south between Bourke Street and Little Lonsdale Street. Restaurants and ski shops are located on the street, as well as hairdressers. A McDonald's franchise is located at the southern end of the street, with other fast food restaurants.

The lane is closed to traffic and at night live jazz entertains visitors to bars and cafés.

Named after Hardware House in the 1920s, Hardware Lane was built on land formerly occupied by Kirk's Horse Bazaar, a horse and livery trading centre built in 1840 by James Bowie Kirk The Stevensons Invest In The New Colony.

Dynon's Building at 63–73 Hardware Lane is a set of four warehouses designed by William Pitt, the designer of some of the finest gothic revival buildings in the city including Princess Theatre.

== Healeys Lane ==
Healeys Lane' is a cobblestone laneway in the central business district (CBD) of Melbourne, Victoria, Australia. Located on the CBD's northern edge between King Street and William Street, Healeys Lane runs north–south between Little Lonsdale Street and Lonsdale Street, close to Melbourne's legal precinct. Since September 2024, Healeys Lane has been the designated Koreatown of Melbourne.

== Hosier Lane ==
Hosier Lane is a bluestone cobbled vehicular and pedestrian laneway on the southern edge of the central city grid. Hosier lane is a much celebrated landmark mainly due to its sophisticated Urban art.

Hosier Lane lies opposite the entrance to the Atrium at Federation Square on Flinders Street, a prominent position in the city.

The lane has been noted for the quality and the often political nature of its art. It features in the state-sponsored book The Melbourne Design Guide and in Tourism Victoria's Lose Yourself in Melbourne advertising campaign, leading to questions about the dichotomy of Victoria's approach to graffiti. The graffiti-covered walls and art-installations have become a popular backdrop for fashion and wedding photography.

Hosier Lane is also known for its upmarket cocktail lounges including the popular Misty and MoVida. An open air cooking session with MoVida's chef Frank Camorra on Masterchef Australia season 2 showcased the lane as a major Melbourne attraction.

== Howey Place ==
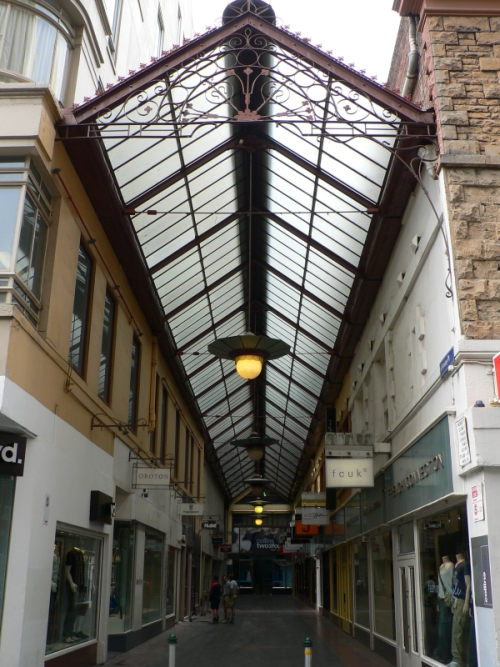
Howey Place

Howey Place, formerly known as "Cole's Walk" is a shopping arcade. The short, narrow covered laneway, running south from Little Collins Street between Swanston Street and Elizabeth Street.

Located in the heart of the shopping precinct, Howey Place is currently flanked with small designer fashion shops. It joins with the Sportsgirl Centre, a shopping mall at 234 Collins Street which runs through to Collins Street, as well forming an "L" shape toward the back of the Capitol Arcade which connects it with Swanston Street.

Motor vehicles are restricted access.

Before 1896, Howey Place was just a drab lane. In 1896, Edward William Cole, the developer of the famous Cole's Book Arcade, covered the lane with a glass canopy and created glass showcases along the street to attract tenants which included a Cole's wholesale bookstore, a toy department store and printing shop.

In the 1920s, the streamline moderne Presgrave building was incorporated into the lane.

Howey House, a tall art-deco building and part of the Collins Street in the 1930s once connected the lane to Collins Street via an open laneway, however Howey House was demolished in the 1980s for the construction of the Sportsgirl Centre, a modern shopping mall.

== Niagara Lane ==
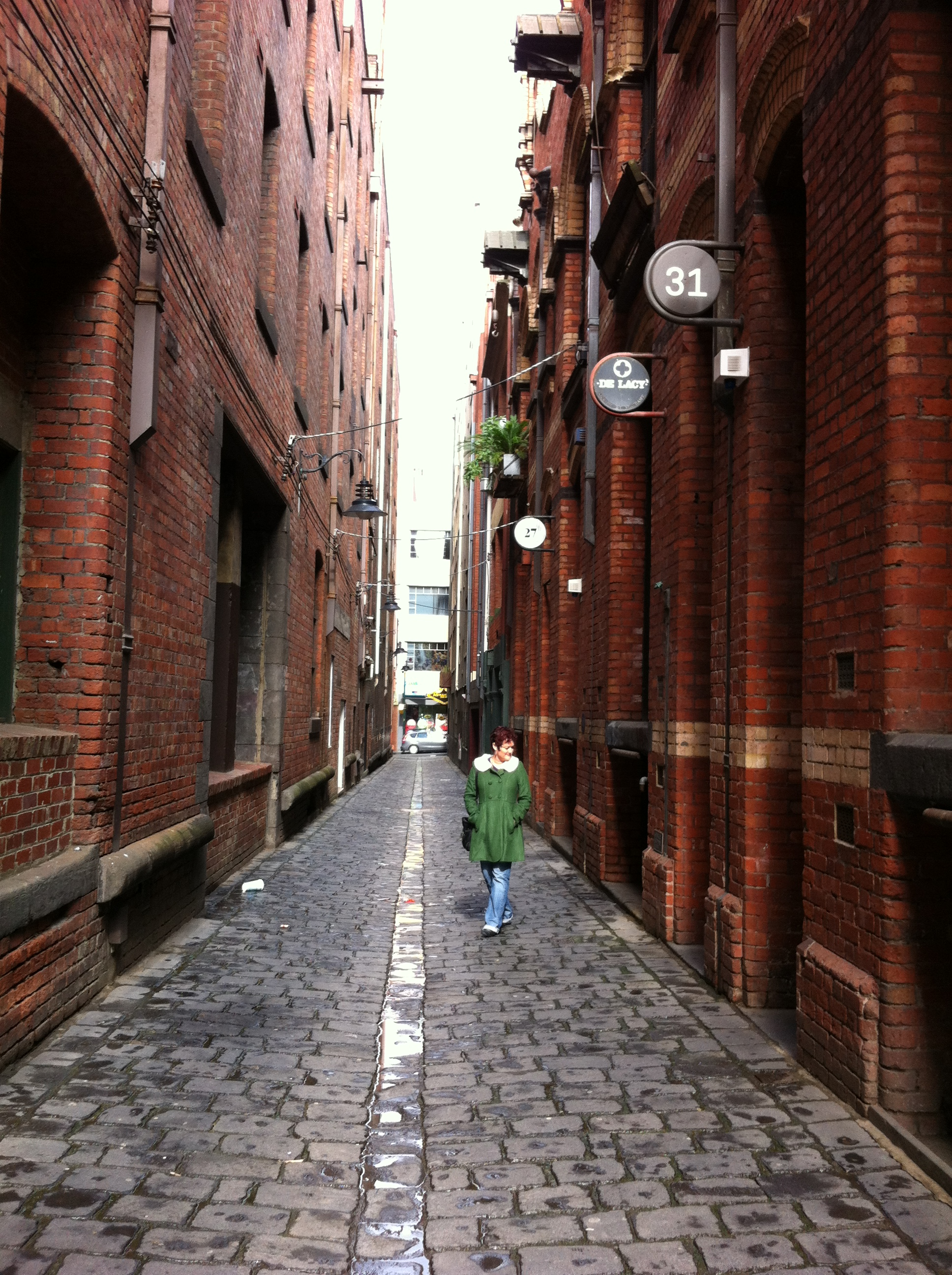
Niagara Lane

Niagara Lane is a small lane running roughly north–south between Bourke Street and Little Bourke Street. The lane is named after the Niagara buildings, early 20th century warehouses which feature their row of original pulley and hook stocking systems from horse and cart days.

The lane is lined by pre-war buildings, is cobbled in bluestone and is accessible to pedestrians and small vehicles. It has a southward vista dominated by the copper dome topped post modern tower 333 Collins Street and Eureka Tower.

On the western corner of Lonsdale Street is the Niagara Hotel. This facade of this 1870s hotel was modified and modernised in the 1920s.

== McKillop Street ==
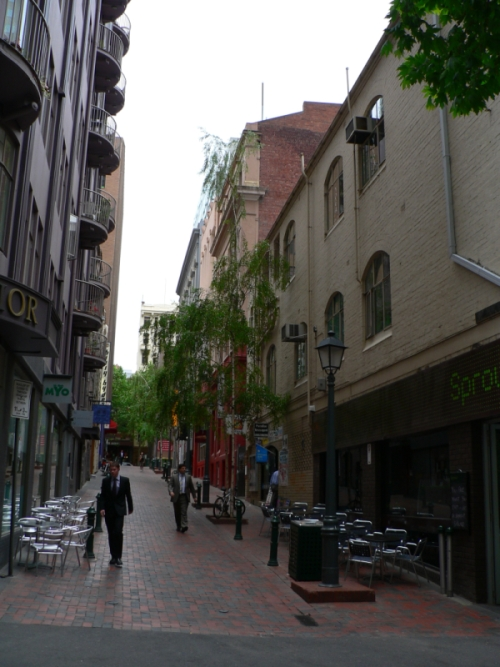
McKillop Street

McKillop Street is a short, quiet and narrow open laneway, running between Bourke Street and Little Collins Street between Queen Street and Elizabeth Street in the central business district of Melbourne.

Located between the financial centre and shopping precinct, McKillop Street is currently flanked by some small boutique shops and outdoor dining cafes.

The lane is paved with red brick, has several trees and heritage style lampposts along it and restricted access to cars. There are some heritage buildings converted into apartments along the street.

== Melbourne GPO ==
The Melbourne General Post Office or GPO, is a landmark building on the corner of Elizabeth Street and Bourke Street that was restored as a retail centre in 2004 and now forms a major arcade running from Bourke Street through to Little Bourke Street.

== Royal Arcade ==
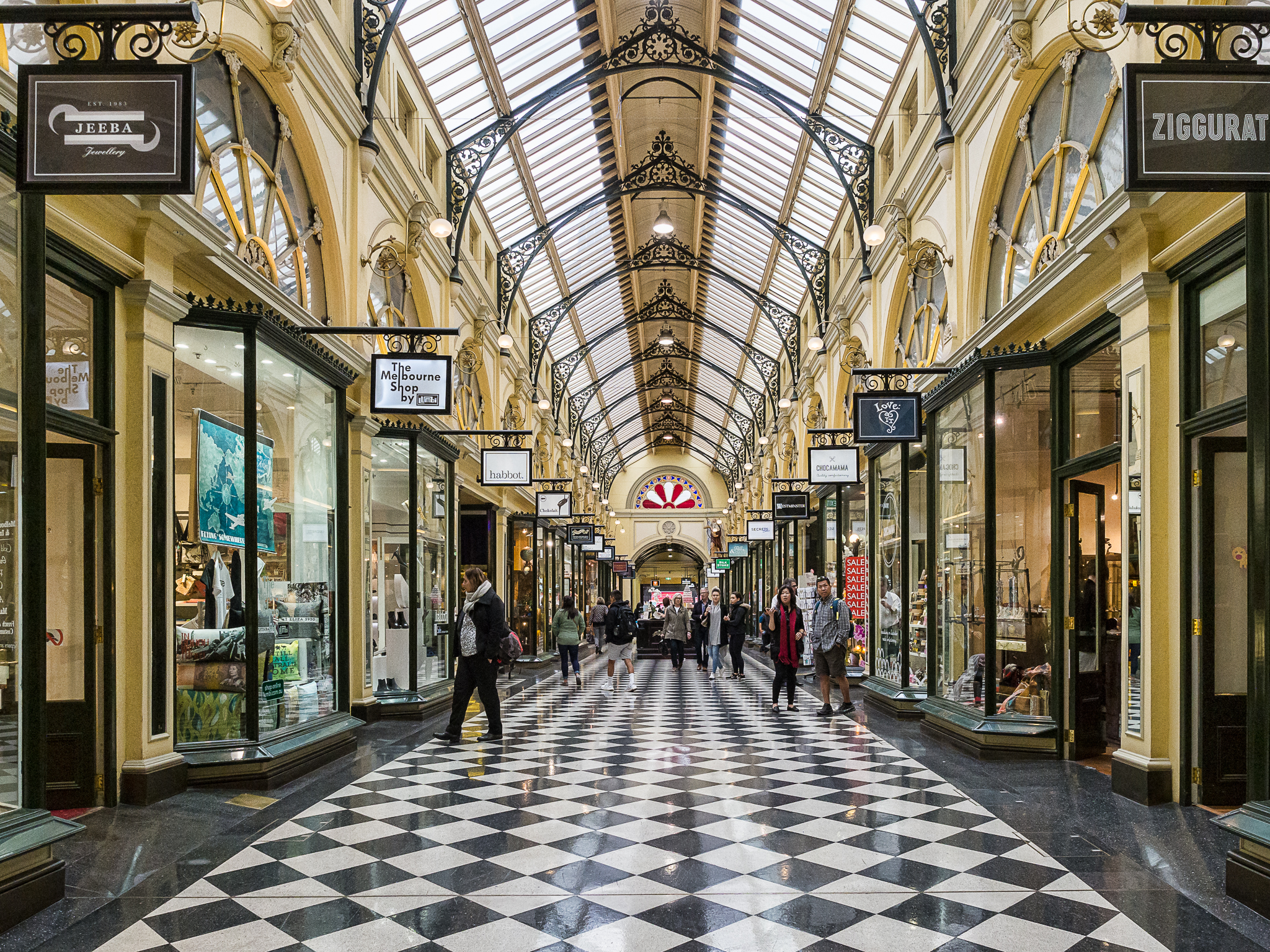
Royal Arcade

Royal Arcade is a heritage shopping arcade originally constructed in 1869, the arcade connects Little Collins Street to the Bourke Street Mall, with a perpendicular passage running to Elizabeth Street in the west. It also connects to the smaller Hub Arcade near the Little Collins Street end.

Originally designed by Charles Webb, the arcade features a high glass roof and windowed stores. At the south end, the arcade features effigies of mythical figures Gog and Magog and a clock which chimes each hour. The arcade was restored between 2002 and 2004 which resulted in additional natural light and consistency of the shopfronts.

It is a significant Victorian era arcade, recorded on the Victorian Heritage Register. In addition, Melbourne's Golden Mile heritage walk runs through the arcade.

Along with Melbourne's other arcade, the Block Arcade, and Melbourne's lanes, it is a tourist icon of the city. Royal Arcade is famous for its fashion stores as well as specialty stores such as tarot card reading store.

== Tattersalls Lane ==
One of the oldest laneways in Melbourne, Tattersalls Lane is located between Swanston and Russell streets, with the lane connecting Lonsdale Street to Little Bourke Street. The lane was named pre-1856 after the Tattersalls Hotel and Tattersalls Club located nearby. The lane is notable for its a mix of eateries, bars and ever-changing street art.

== See also ==
- Lanes and alleyways of Sydney
