= Block Place =

Street in Melbourne, Victoria

Coordinates: 37°48′55″S 144°57′51.5″E

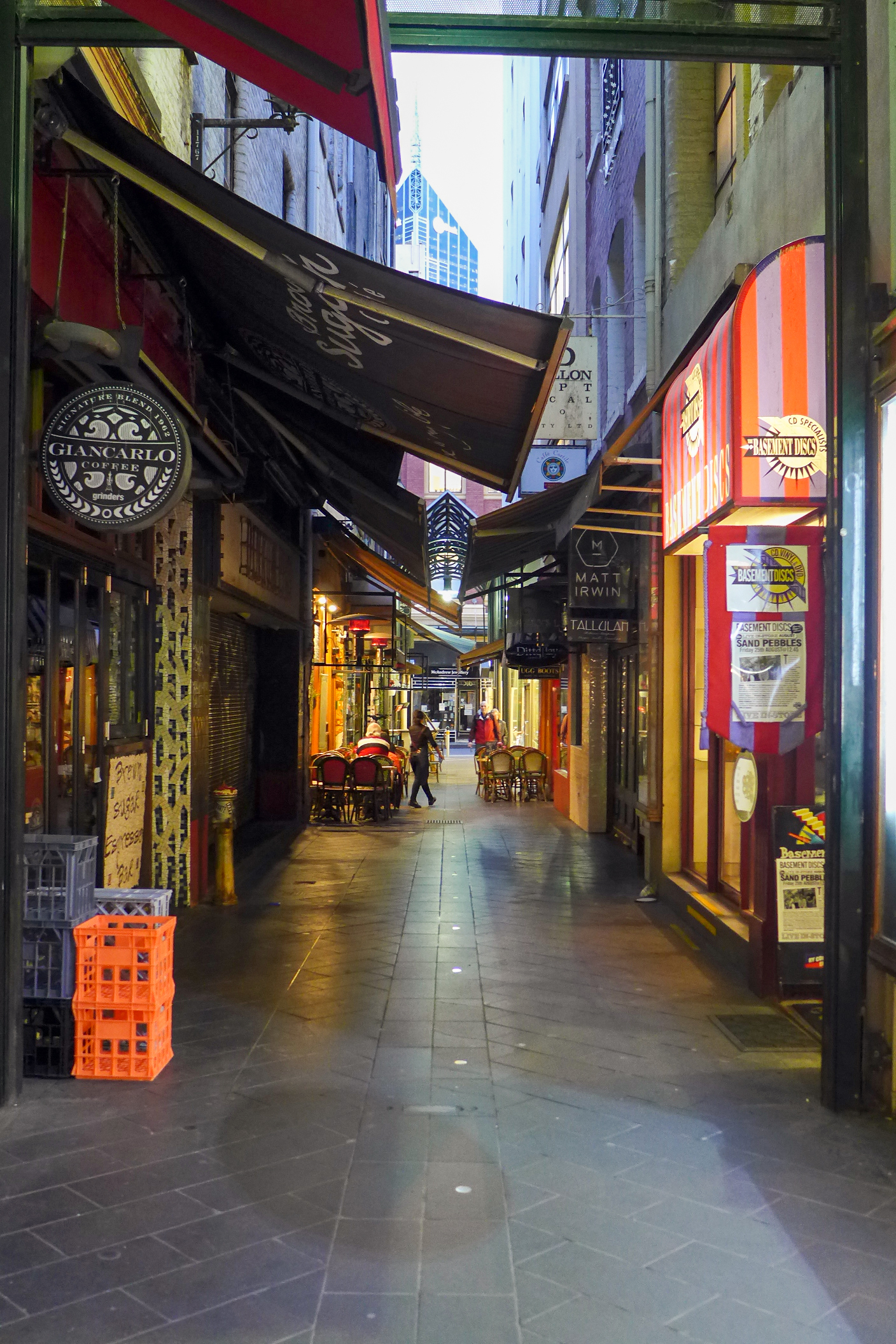
Block Place

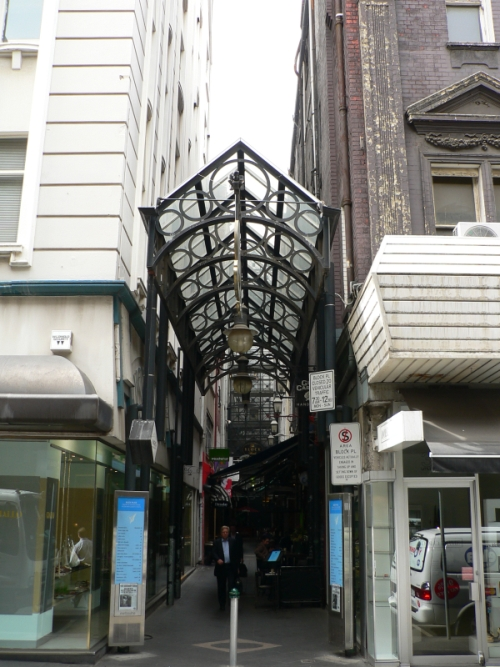
Block Place looking south from Little Collins Street

Block Place is a street in Melbourne. It is a short, narrow partially covered laneway, running south from Little Collins Street between Swanston Street and Elizabeth streets in the Melbourne central business district.

Block Place is a pedestrian only laneway that is trendy and popular with both Melbourne locals and tourists for its intimate alfresco cafes close to the shopping heart of Melbourne it is crowded with cafes and shops in a number of pre-war buildings. Cafe Segovia is one of a popular lunch destination and a popular record store is located in underground basements.

The lane joins with the heritage Block Arcade, a 19th-century covered shopping arcade. Block Arcade and Block Place form a T-shape running from Little Collins Street through to Collins Street and Elizabeth Street.

Royal Arcade is just across Little Collins and connects through to Bourke Street.
