= Hardware Lane =

Street in Melbourne, Victoria

Coordinates: 37°48′51″S 144°57′41.5″E

Hardware Lane Hardware Street
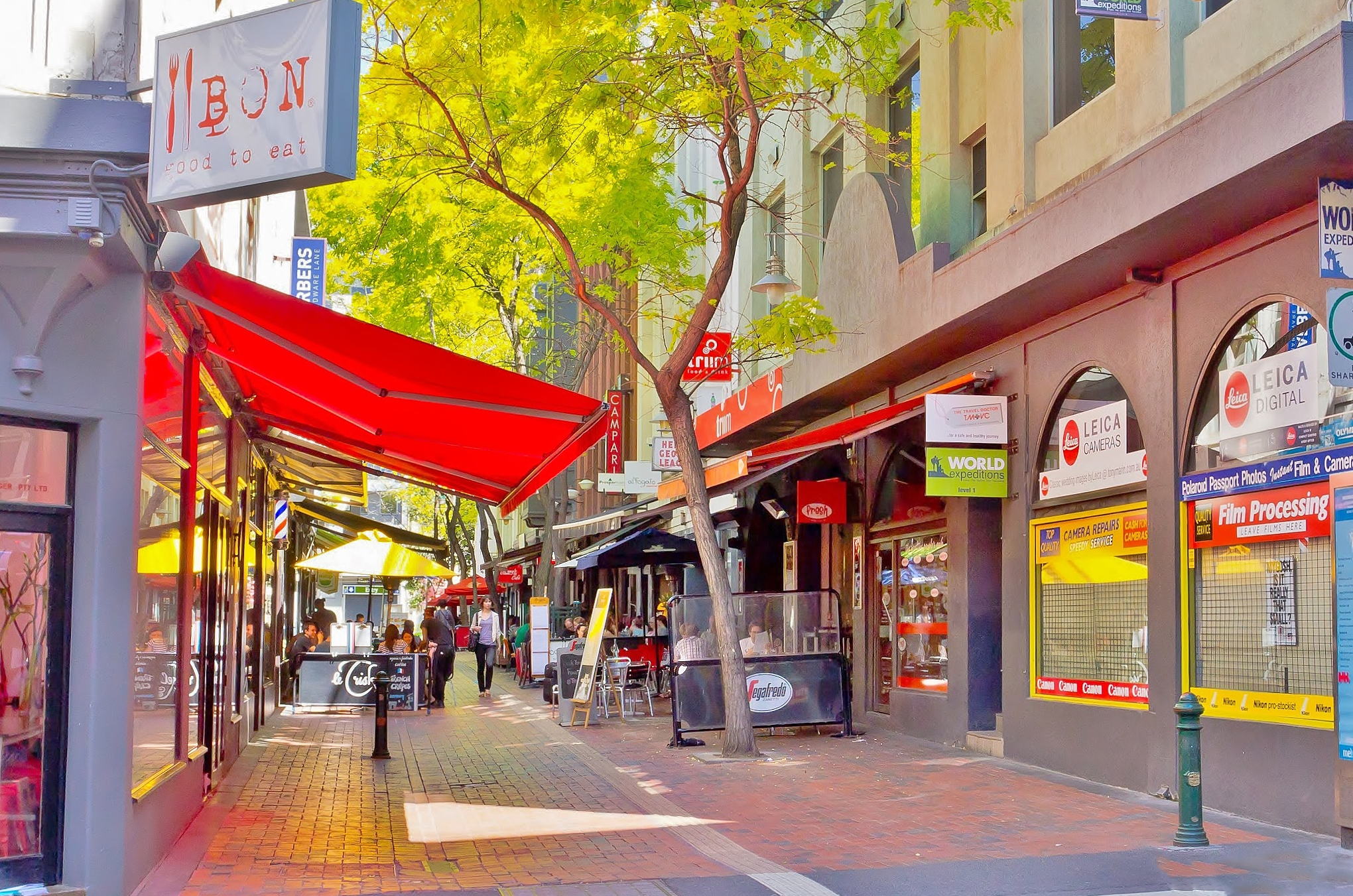
- Hardware Lane facing south towards Bourke Street

General information
- Type: Street
- Opened: 1837

Major junctions
- South end: Bourke Street
- Little Bourke Street; Lonsdale Street
- North end: Little Lonsdale Street

Location(s)
- Suburb(s): Melbourne central business district

Hardware Lane is a wide laneway in the Melbourne central business district, Australia. It runs roughly north–south between Bourke Street and Little Lonsdale Street. It changes name to Hardware Street between Lonsdale and Little Lonsdale Streets.

The lane is famous for its numerous restaurants and cafés, though also features hairdressers, fast food restaurants and retail shops. Hardware lane is a thriving example of Melbourne's famous laneway culture, with a distinctly European feeling and unique red brick paving.

The lane is closed to traffic between 11am-11pm and occasionally features nighttime live jazz performances.

== History ==
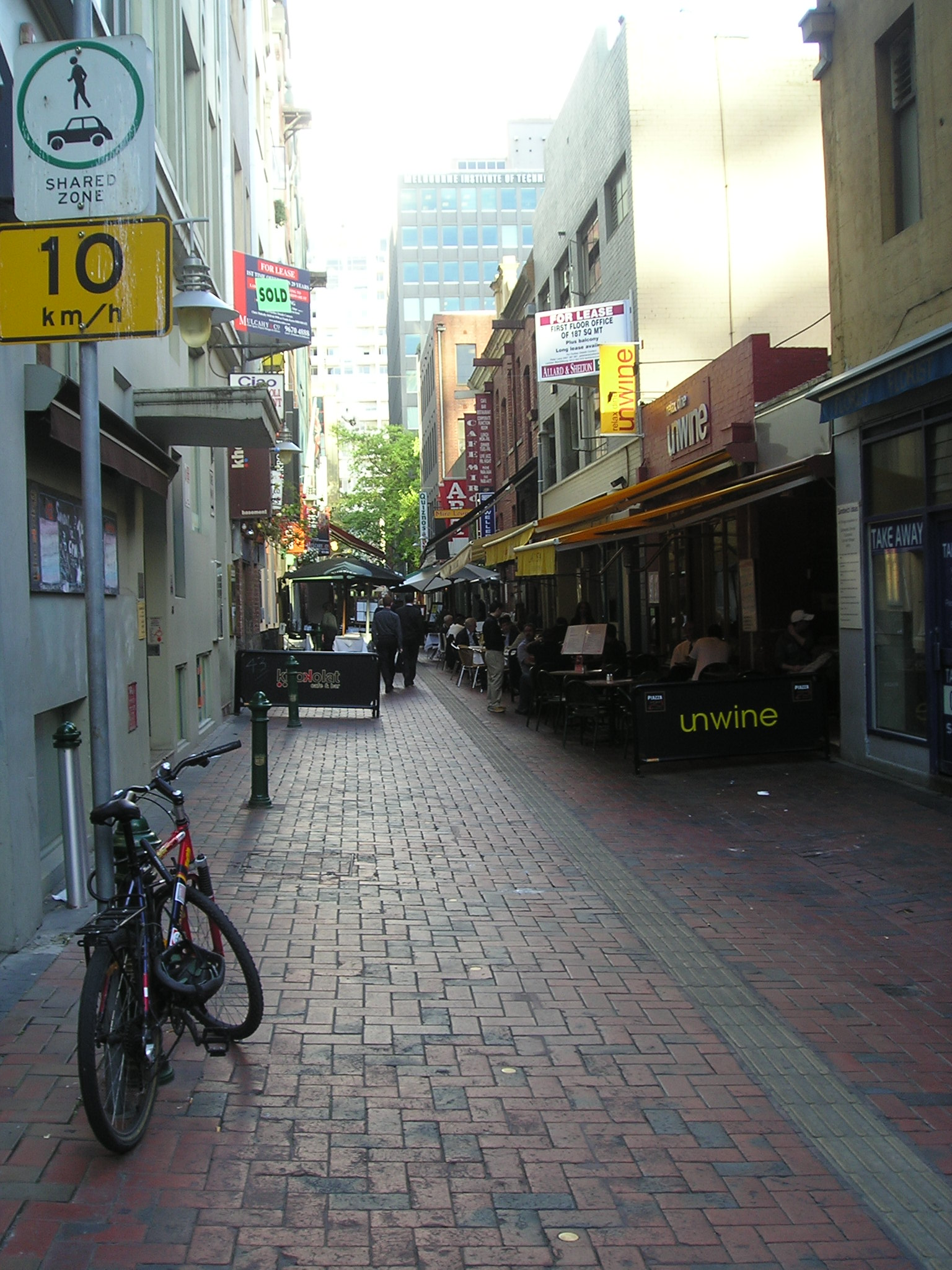
Hardware Lane

From 1857, the lane was known as Wrights Lane. In 1927 it was renamed Hardware Lane after Hardware House. The lane is on land formerly occupied by Kirk's Horse Bazaar, a horse and livery trading centre built in 1840 by James Bowie Kirk, and the first home of Melbourne's Tattersall's Club, where wagers with the big bookmakers were settled.

In 1895, Wrights Lane (as it was then known) was also home to several hotels. The Kirks Bazaar Hotel, which was first occupied in 1866, was located on the eastern corner of Little Bourke, whilst the adjacent corner featured the Governor Arthur Hotel. The Shamrock Hotel was situated at the opposite end of the lane, on the intersection with Lonsdale Street. There are no functioning hotels that remain on the modern Hardware Lane.

Dynon's Building at 63-73 Hardware Lane is a set of four warehouses designed by William Pitt, the designer of some of the finest gothic revival buildings in the city, including the Princess Theatre.
