= McKillop Street =

Street in Melbourne, Victoria

Coordinates: 37°48′55″S 144°57′42″E

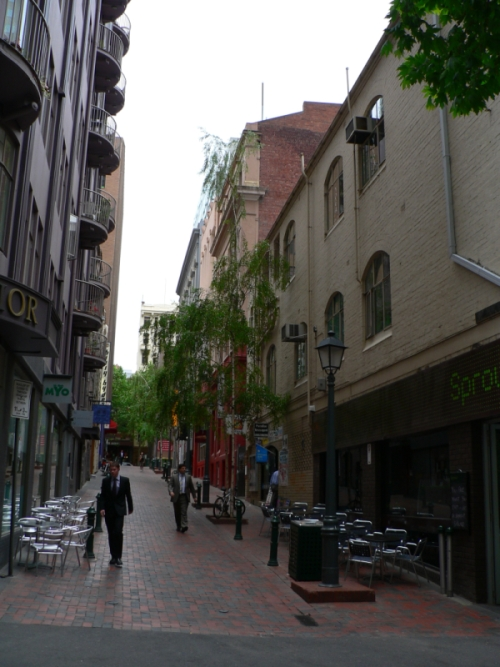
McKillop Street looking north from Little Collins Street

McKillop Street is a street in Melbourne, Victoria, Australia. It is a short, quiet and narrow open laneway, running between Bourke Street and Little Collins Street between Queen Street and Elizabeth Street in the Melbourne central business district.

Located between the financial centre and shopping precinct, McKillop Street is currently flanked by some small boutique shops and outdoor dining cafes.

The lane is paved with red brick, has several trees and heritage style lampposts along it and restricted access to cars. There are some heritage buildings converted into apartments along the street.
