= Royal Arcade, Melbourne =

Shopping arcade in Melbourne, Victoria

Coordinates: 37.8145°S 144.9641°E

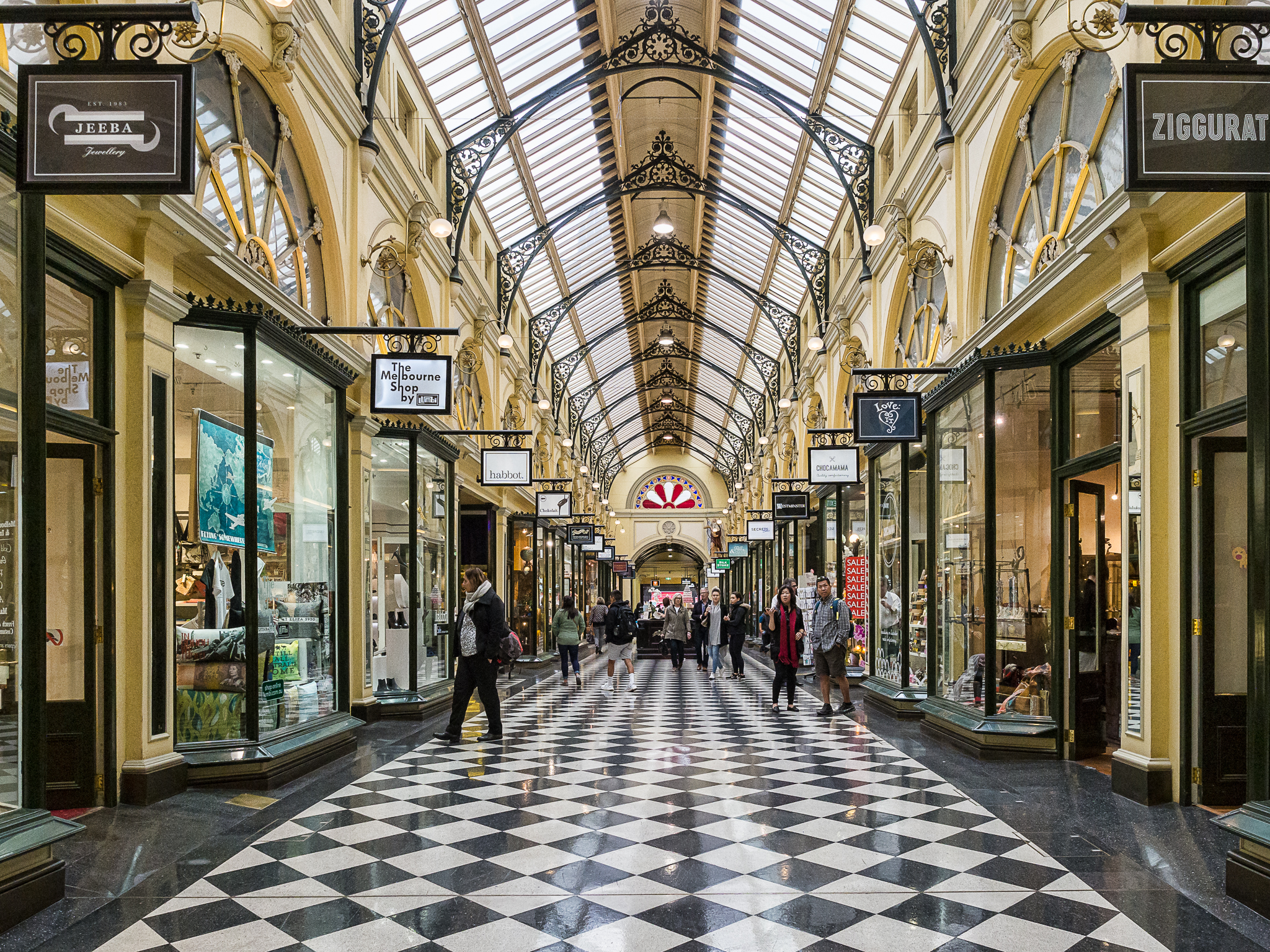
Inside the arcade looking north

The Royal Arcade is a historic shopping arcade in the central business district of Melbourne, Victoria, Australia. Opened in 1870, it connects Bourke Street Mall to Little Collins Street, with a side offshoot to Elizabeth Street. It is the oldest surviving arcade in Australia, known for its elegant light-filled interior, and the large carved mythic figures of Gog and Magog flanking the southern entry.

Along with Melbourne's other Victorian era arcade, the nearby Block Arcade, it is a tourist icon of the city, and forms part of the network of lanes and arcades in the CBD.

The arcade is listed on the Victorian Heritage Register, as well as by the National Trust of Australia. It also forms part of Melbourne's Golden Mile heritage walk.

== History ==
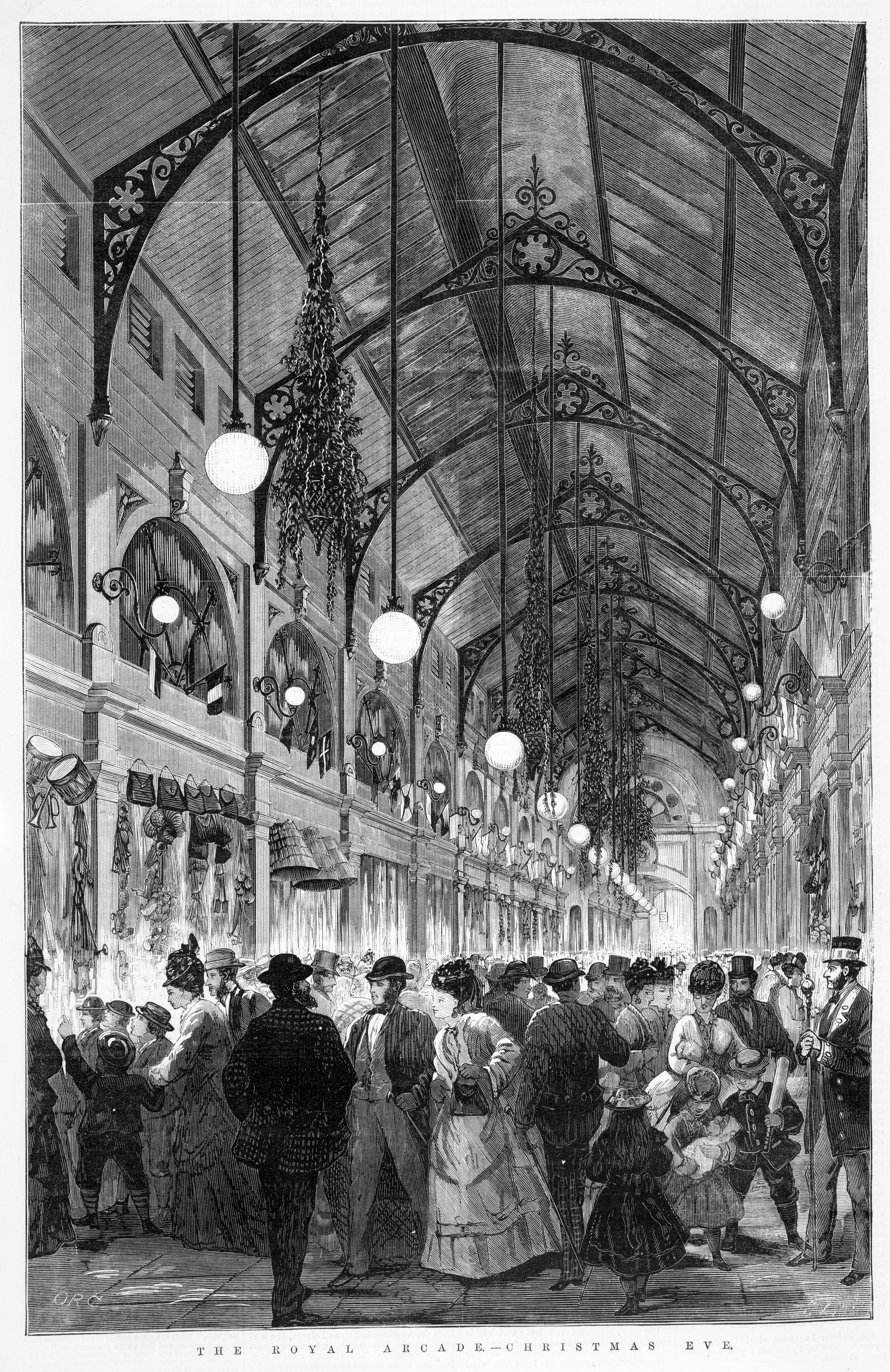
Royal Arcade on Christmas Eve, 1874

Designed by Charles Webb, who won a competition in 1868, it was formally opened by the Lord Mayor of the City of Melbourne on 2 May, 1870.

The arcade interior features a high glass roof supported on cast iron frames, and elegant bow fronted shopfronts, with arched windows to the storerooms above each shop. It originally featured central hanging lamps, flat shopfronts, a slate floor, and a fountain at the south end. One of the south end shops was occupied by a Victorian Turkish Bath.

The arcade's most famous features were added in 1893; at the south end, the carved mythical figures of Gog and Magog (based on those in London's Guildhall) flank the large 'Gaunt's clock', which triggers the arms of the figures to strike bells each hour. At the north end a figure of Father Time was also added. Gaunt was Melbourne's best known clock-maker at the time.

The shopfronts were all changed into bow fronted windows in 1890-1894, and in 1902, further alteration saw the creation of the large arched niche at the south end, and an extension was added to the west side through to Elizabeth Street. The shopfronts later altered again, creating a continuous line of widows forward of the original line, various central kiosks were added, and the black and white chequered marble floor was laid in 1934. In the 1950s, a connection was created to the short Hub Arcade to the west on Little Collins Street. In later decades some shopfronts were altered again, and a range of signage introduced. In the 1920s the cast iron verandah on Bourke Street was replaced by a cantilevered one, but was recreated in simpler form in the 1990s.

In 2002-04 a major refurbishment and restoration included the recreation the 1894 shopfronts, bringing a consistency to the shopfronts once more, and the facade was repainted in a yellow and white colour scheme, with gilded highlights.

== Gallery ==
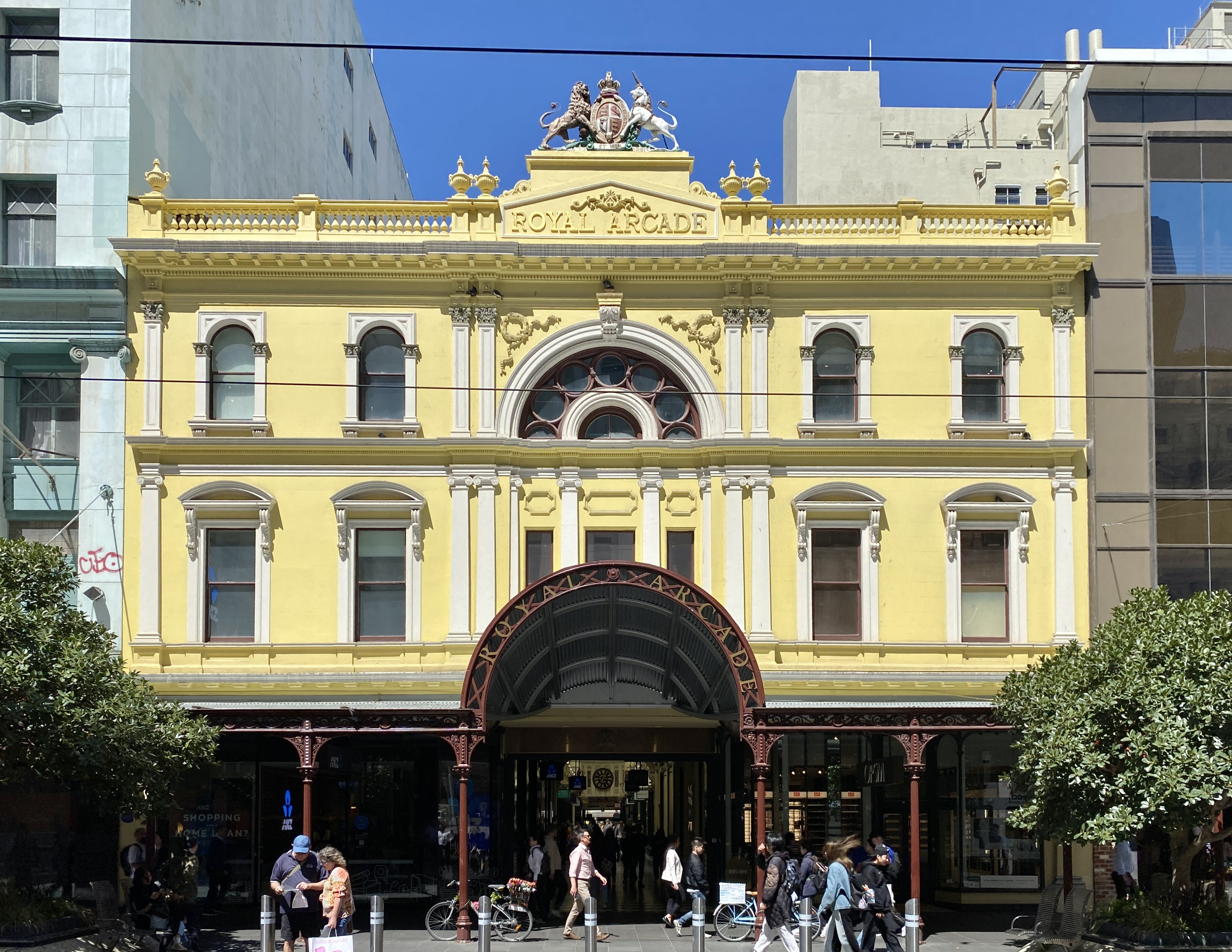
Bourke Street front

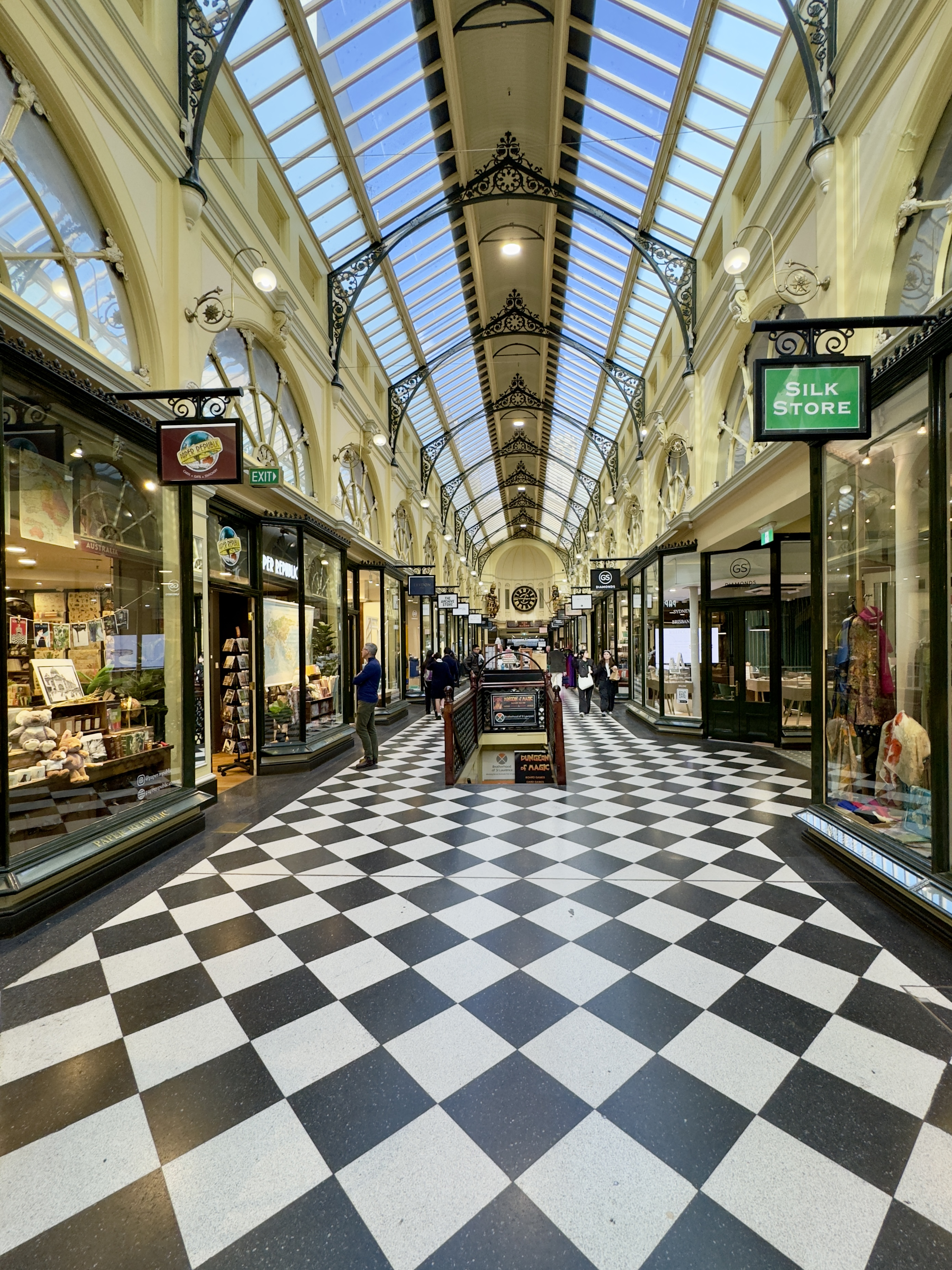
View looking south

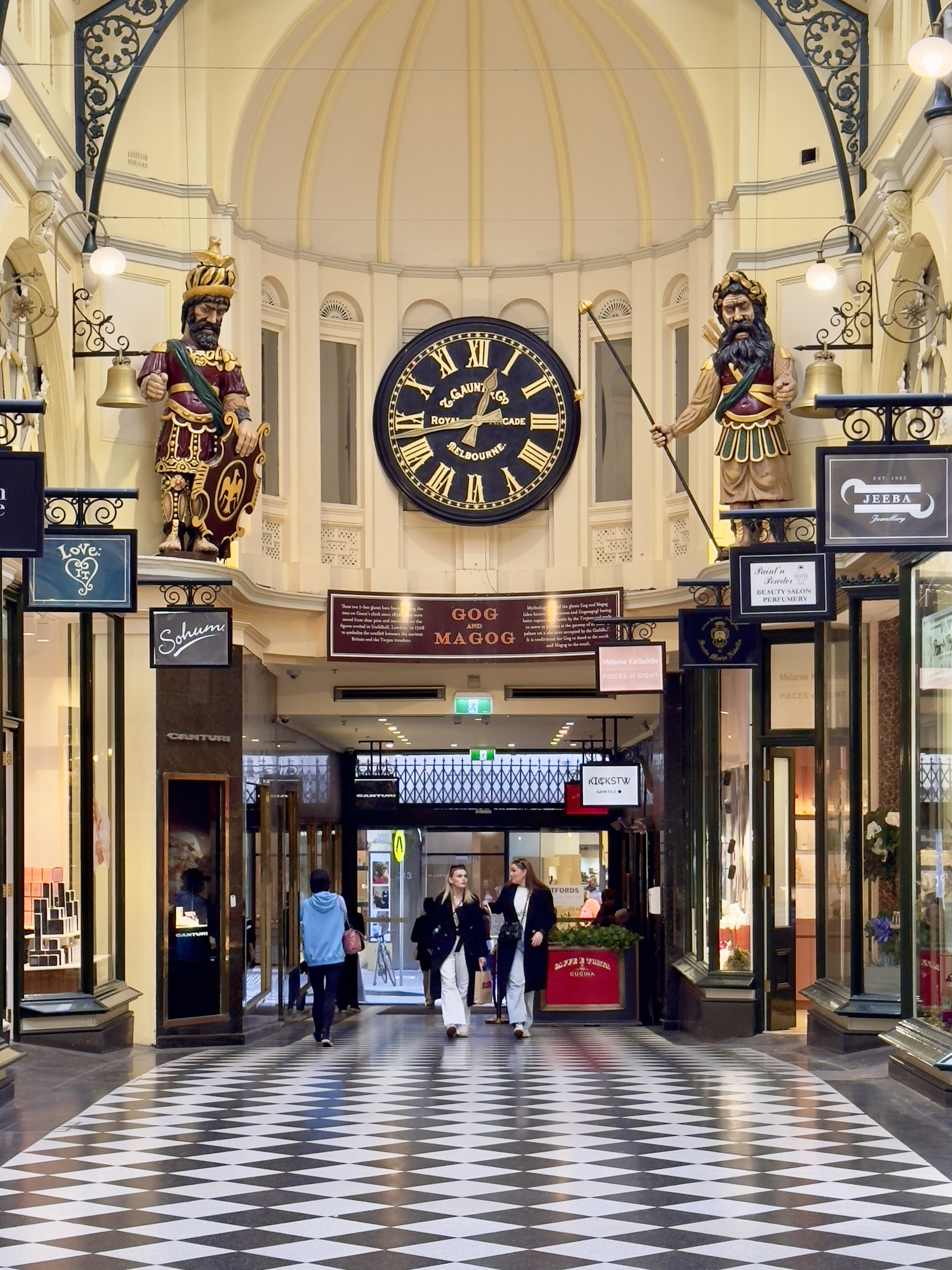
South end, featuring Gog & Magog

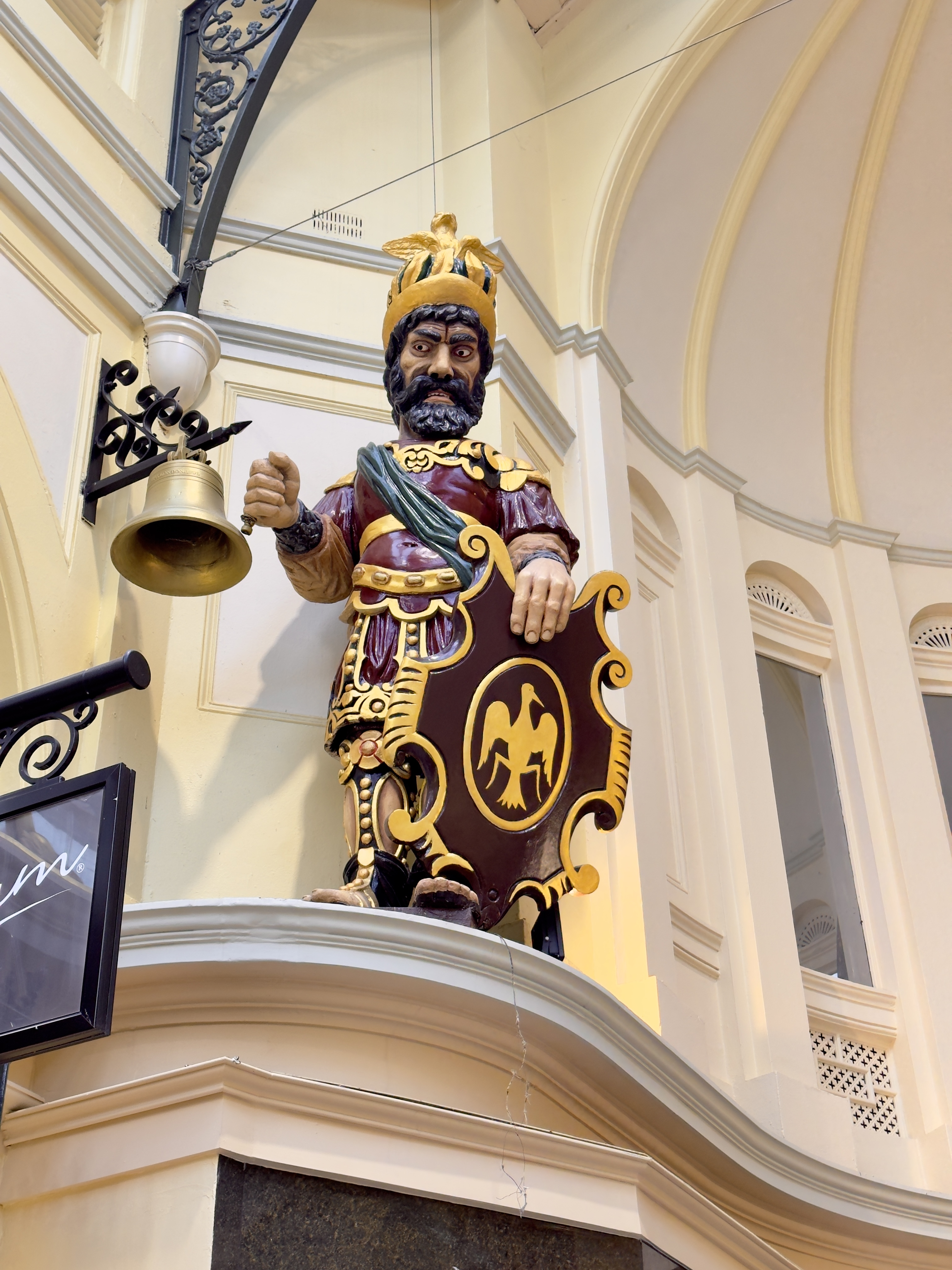
Magog

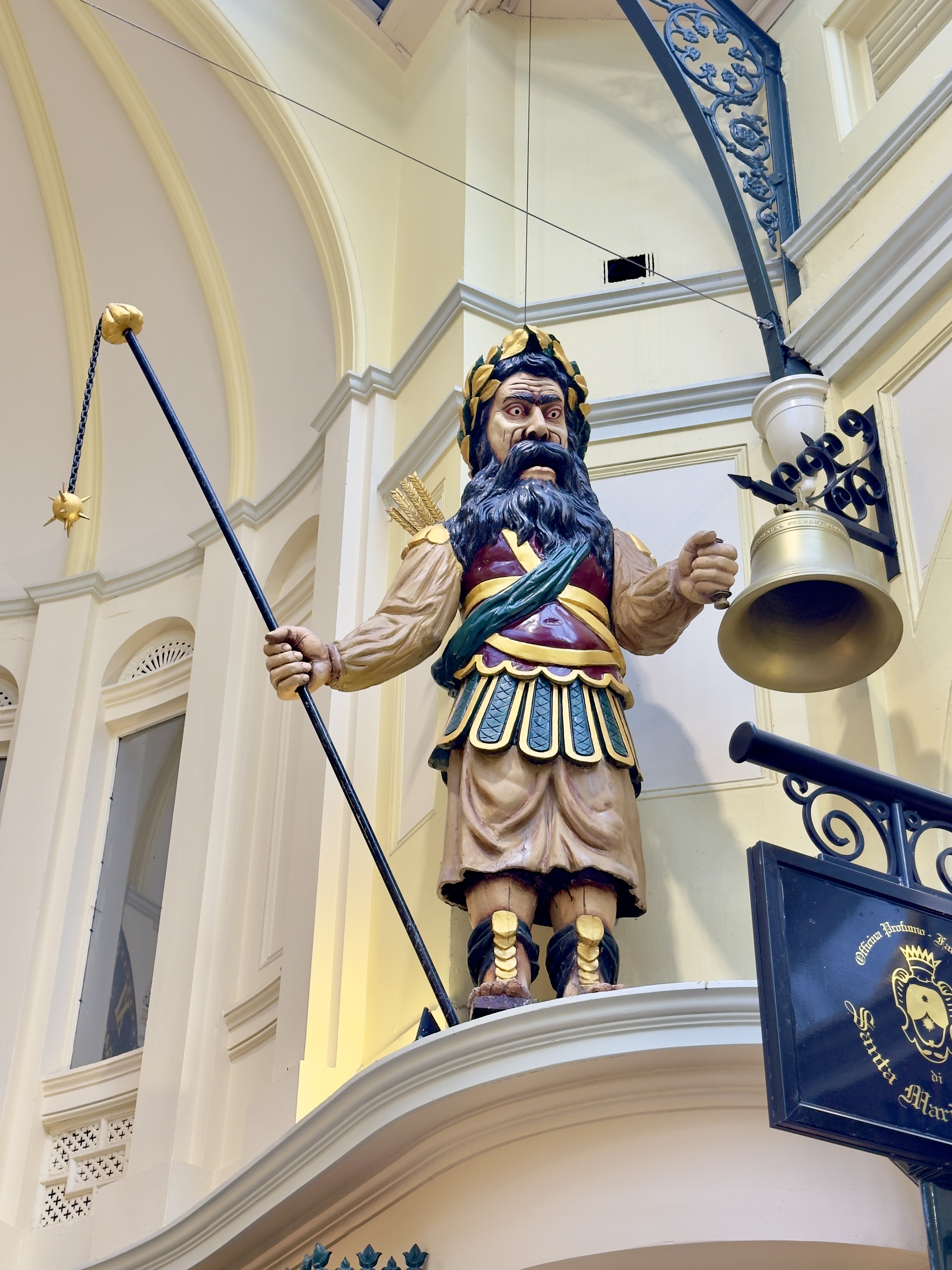
Gog

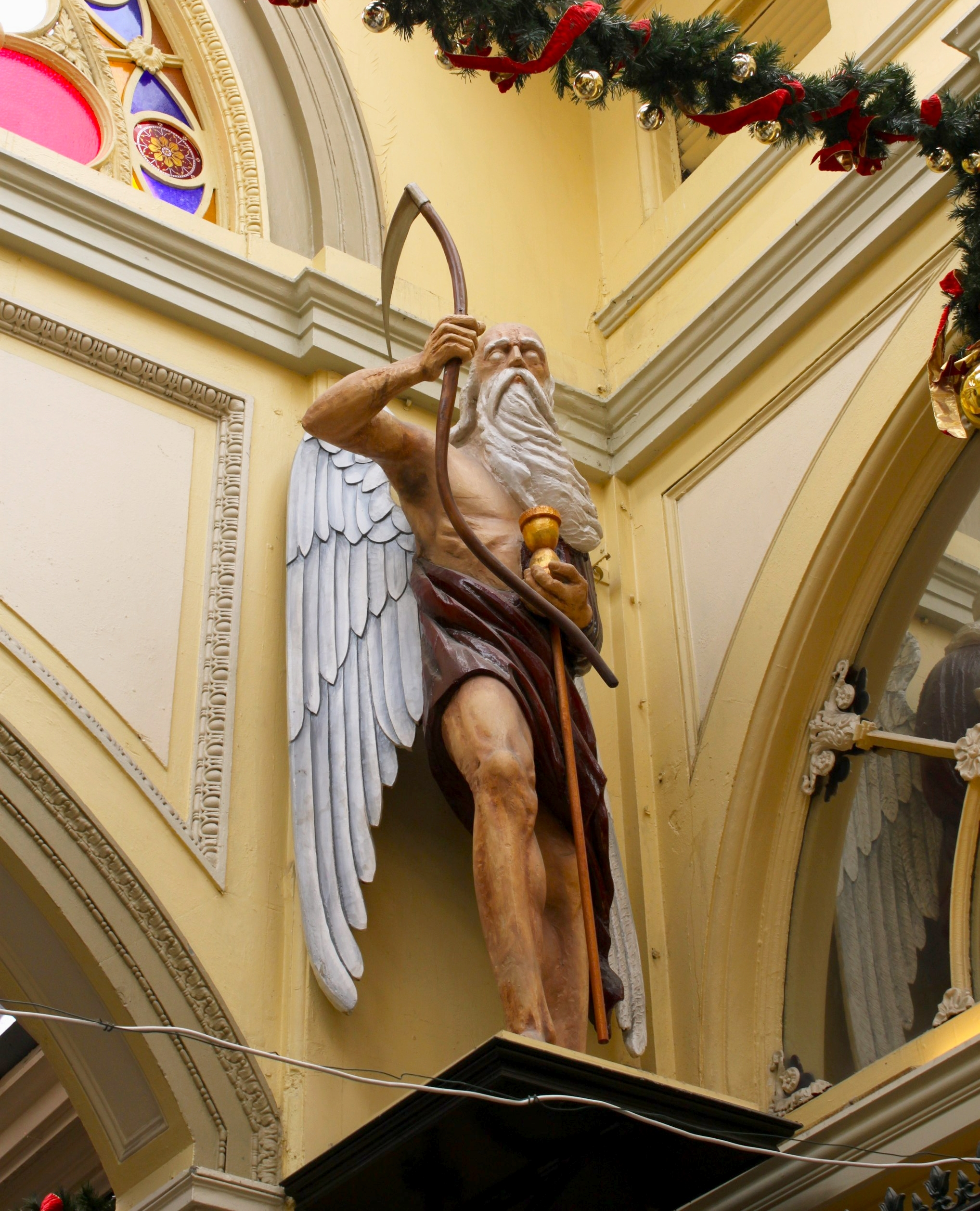
Sculpture of Father Time, north end

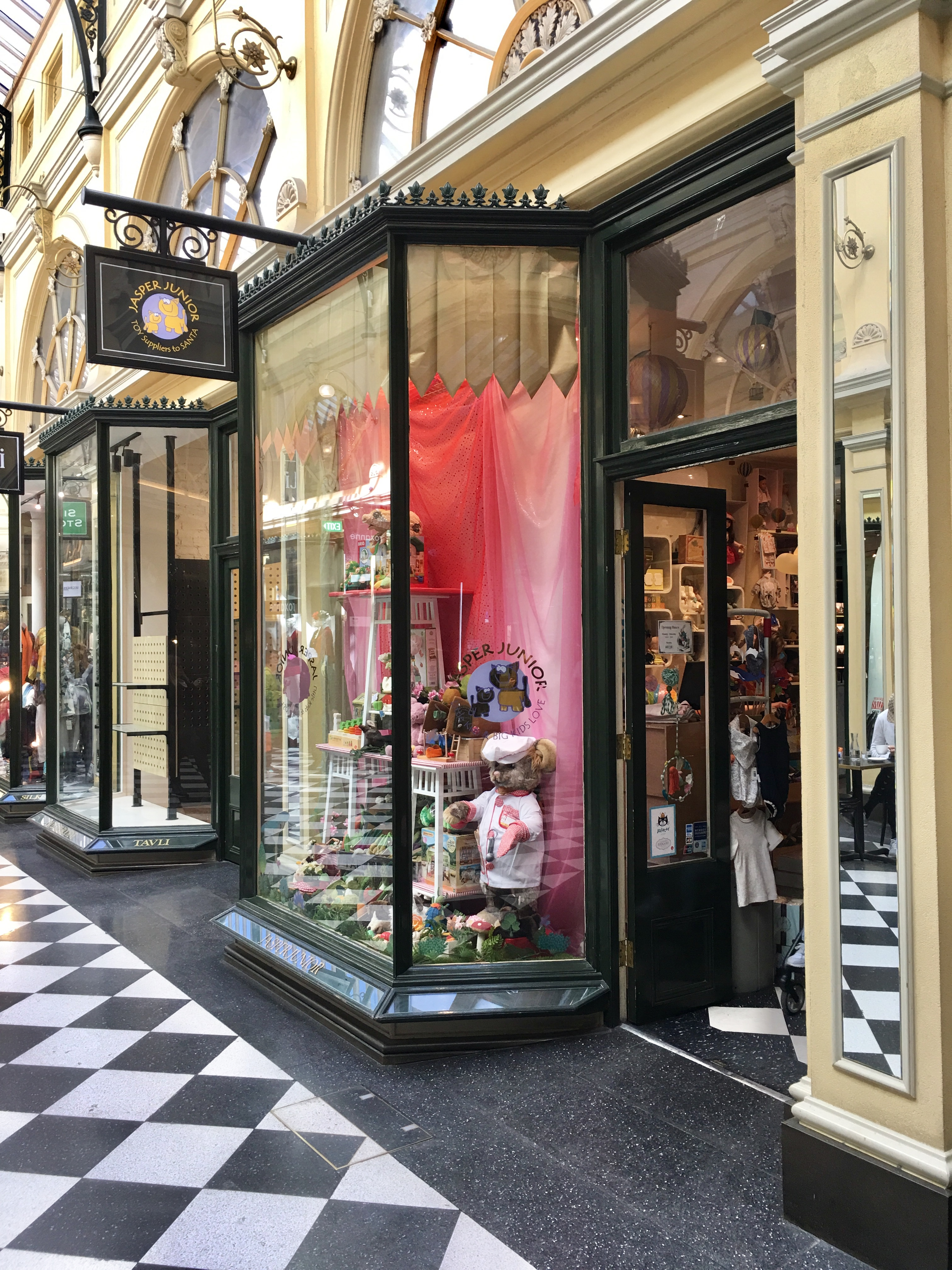
Bow fronted shopfronts

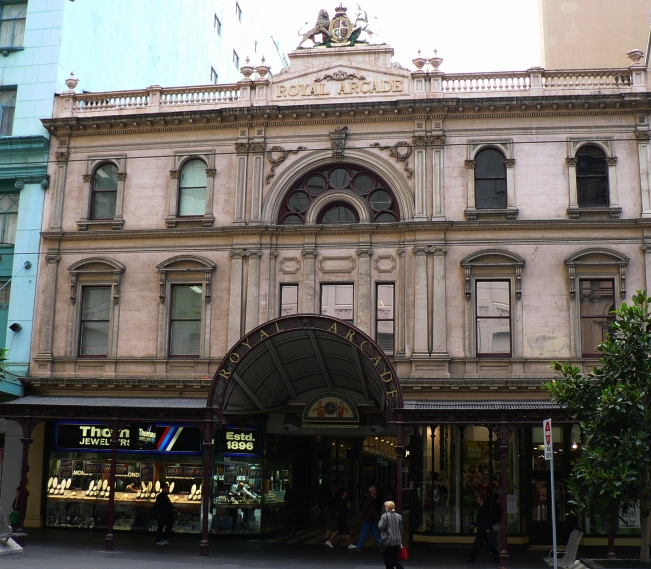
The Bourke Street Mall facade in 2006

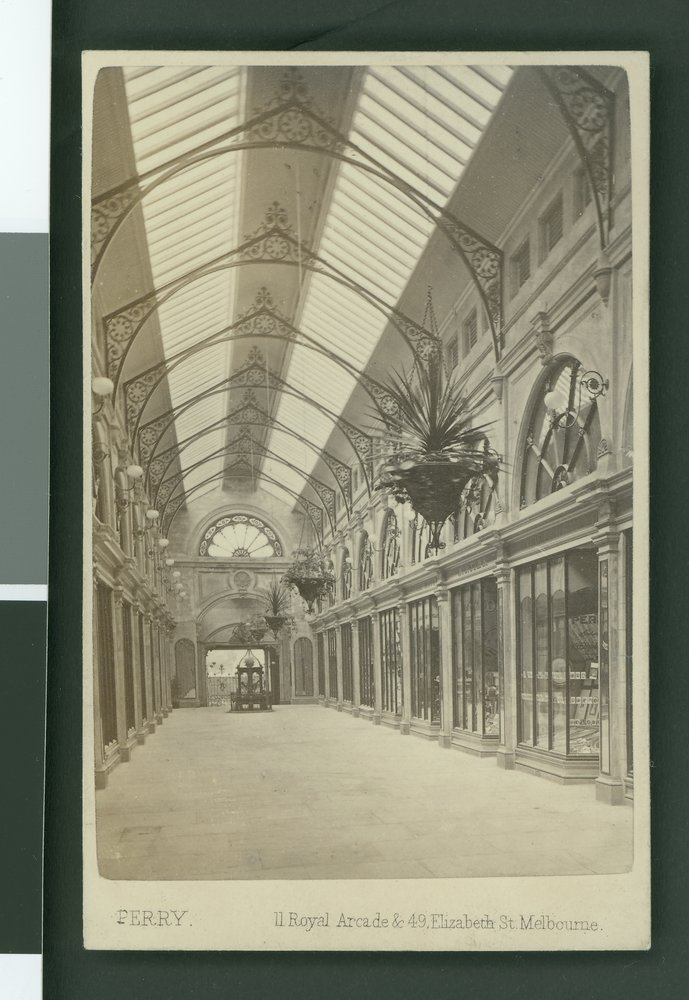
Interior, 1870

== See also ==
- Lanes and arcades of Melbourne
- Architecture of Melbourne
