= Howey Place =

Shopping arcade in Melbourne, Victoria

Coordinates: 37°48′55″S 144°57′55.5″E

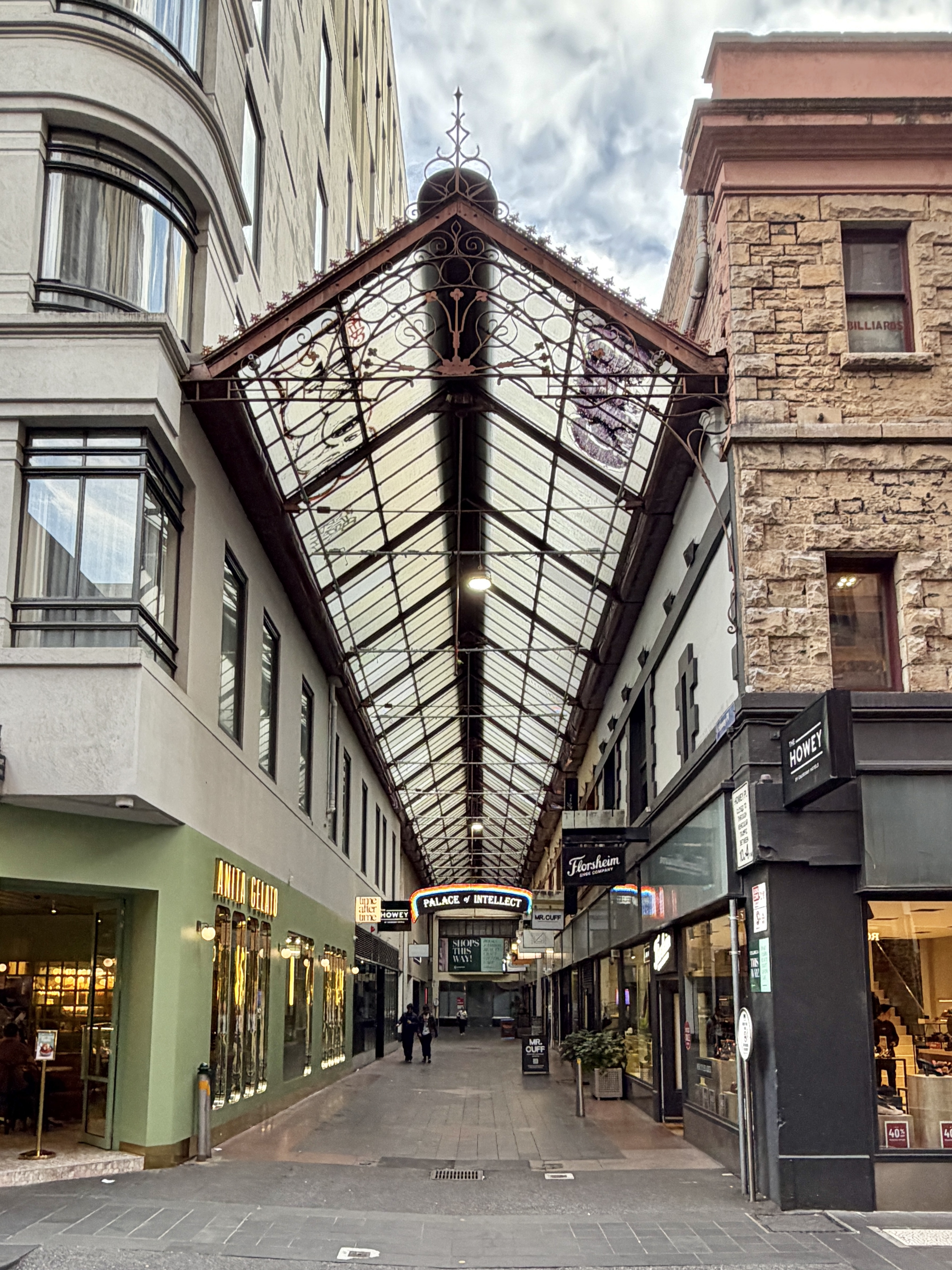
Howey Place looking south from Little Collins, 2026

Howey Place is covered pedestrian laneway in the central business district of Melbourne, running south from Little Collins Street between Swanston Street and Elizabeth Streetm, with a dogleg to the east.

Located in the heart of the shopping precinct, Howey Place is currently flanked with small retail outlets. A number of lanes and pedestrian walkways run off it, including Presgrave Lane, the Capitol Arcade which connects to Swanston Street, a shopping mall at 234 Collins Street which runs through to Collins Street, and the lobby/arcade of the Manchester Unity Building on the corner of Swanston and Collins Streets.

Access for deliveries and other vehicles is allowed at restricted times.

== History ==
Henry Howey of Goulburn, NSW bought three lots comprising about a third of this city block at the original land sales in 1837 for £128. After he and his family drowned on passage from Sydney, his property passed to his brother John Werge Howey and finally to his son Captain John Edwards Presgrave Howey. JEP Howey is best remembered as the man who built the Romney, Hythe & Dymchurch Railway in Kent, England.

Like most city blocks, the lots were quickly subdivided, with laneways providing access to the rear and sides of buildings. The Howey Estate properties were no different, but they retained ownership of many of the properties well into the 20th century, selling long leases rather than the land. This lane was created some time in the early 1850s, running next to an 1850s warehouse to the west (still standing), with the dogleg providing access to the rear of properties facing Collins Street. It was known as Howey Alley in 1853, and later as Howey Lane.

Edward William Cole, who had created the famous Cole's Book Arcade on Bourke Street in the 1880s, had extended it through the Little Collins Street, and in 1896 extended it further. He leased the 1850s warehouse adjacent to Howey Place, installing shopfronts, covered the lane with a glass canopy, and provided access through to Collins Street via a Collins Street shop. The 1850s warehouse housed wholesale books, a toy department, and a printing shop, and the lane became known as Coles Walk. Coles Book Arcade closed in 1928. Old maps show that access to Collins Street was then provided through Howey House at 244 Collins Street, as well as an arcade through Howey Court at 234-8 Collins Street, built in 1931.

In 1935, the Streamline Moderne Presgrave Building replaced older buildings on the east side of the lane, but kept the canopy in place.

In the 1980s Howey House and adjacent buildings were demolished for the construction of the Sportsgirl Centre, a modern shopping mall, which opened in 1991. The development retained a connection to Howey Place, which was refurbished with bluestone paving and new light fittings.

In 2022, a laneway activation program saw more small business occupy the once-empty shops, and in 2024 a colourful "Palace of Intellect" sign was added commemorating Coles Book Arcade.
