= Little Lonsdale Street =

Street in Melbourne, Victoria

Little Lonsdale Street Victoria
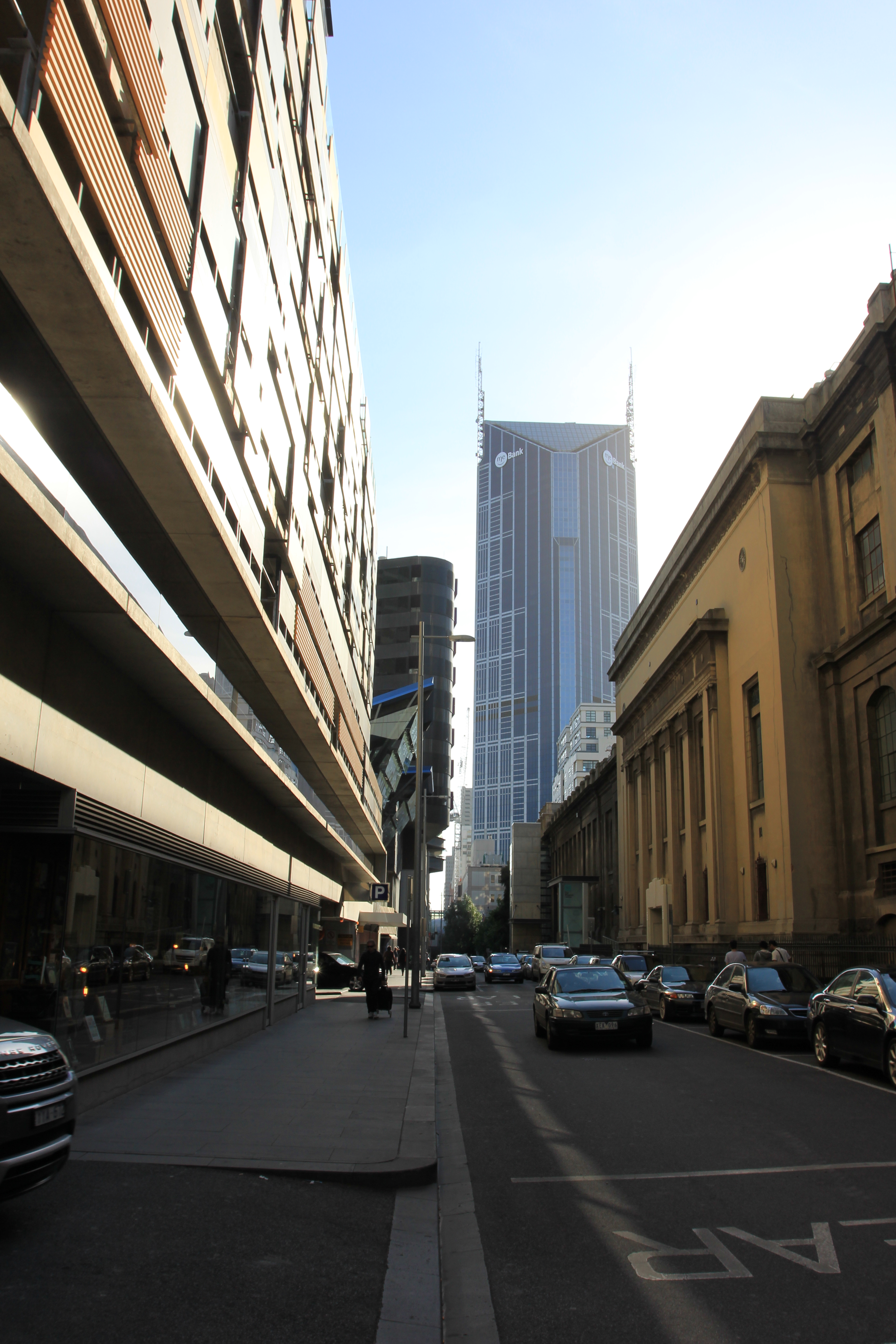
- Little Lonsdale Street in 2012
- Coordinates: 37°48′42″S 144°57′38″E

General information
- Type: Street
- Length: 2 km (1.2 mi)

Major junctions
- West end: Spencer Street; Melbourne CBD
- King Street; William Street; Queen Street; Elizabeth Street; Swanston Street; Russell Street; Exhibition Street
- East end: Spring Street; Melbourne CBD

Location(s)
- LGA(s): City of Melbourne
- Suburb(s): Melbourne CBD

Little Lonsdale Street is located in the centre of Melbourne, Victoria, Australia. A part of the Hoddle Grid, it runs roughly east–west. North of Lonsdale Street and south of La Trobe Street, Little Lonsdale Street's eastern end intersects with Spring Street while its western end intersects with Spencer Street. It was named after William Lonsdale, the first administrator and magistrate in Melbourne. Unlike the other little streets, it runs one-way in the easterly direction, not the west.

In the nineteenth century, the eastern end of the street ran through a notorious "red light district", known as "Little Lon". It was associated with prostitution, petty crime and "larrikinism".
