= Little Collins Street =

Street in Melbourne, Australia

Little Collins Street Victoria
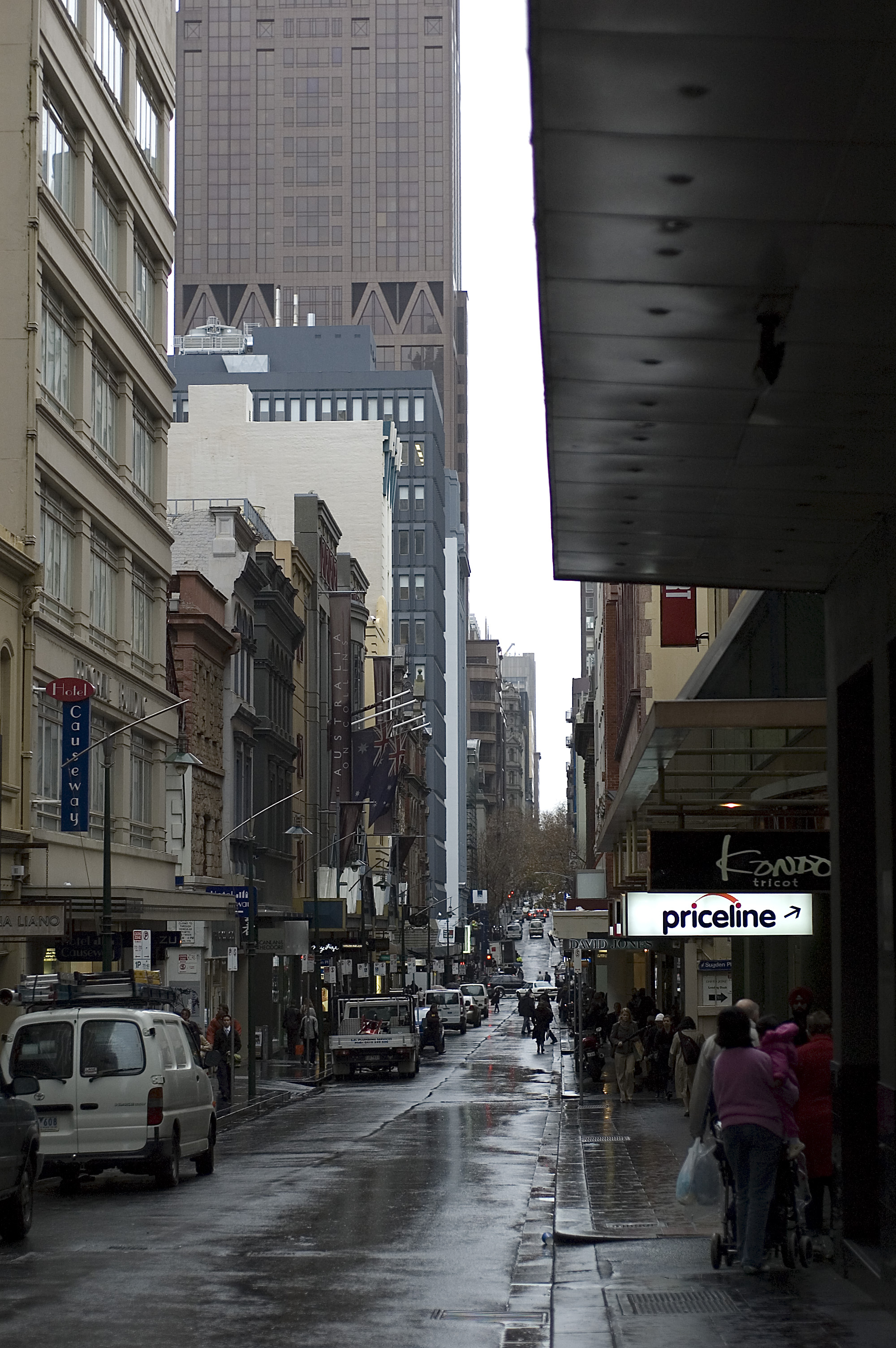
- Looking down Little Collins Street from Swanston Street. The large building is the former ANZ World Headquarters
- Coordinates: 37.8145°S 144.9661°E

General information
- Type: Street
- Length: 2 km (1.2 mi)

Major junctions
- West end: Spencer Street; Melbourne CBD
- King Street; William Street; Queen Street; Elizabeth Street; Swanston Street; Russell Street; Exhibition Street
- East end: Spring Street; Melbourne CBD

Location(s)
- LGA(s): City of Melbourne
- Suburb(s): Melbourne CBD

Little Collins Street is a minor street in the Melbourne central business district, Victoria, Australia.

The street runs parallel to and to the north of Collins Street and as a narrow one way lane takes on the name of the wider main street.

The street has many boutique shops, bars and hotels in lanes at the 'Paris End' and offices towards the Docklands end. Howey Place, Royal Arcade and The Causeway are notable arcades.

== Geography ==
Little Collins Street runs roughly from east to west and it bisects the CBD (known as the Hoddle Grid) along its long axis. Little Collins Street runs between the parallel Collins Street and Bourke Street streets.

The street has some notable buildings, including the CH2 (Council House 2 - the world's first Six star rating environmentally friendly building), Victoria Hotel, City of Melbourne buildings and ANZ Bank World Headquarters. On the corner of Little Collins Street and King Street is the city's first and only school, Melbourne City School, housed in a three-story bluestone heritage building.

At the western end is Bank Place, a significant old lane which provides pedestrian access to Collins Street between Queen and William streets. The block between Queen and William Streets has a large number of weekday cafes.

The section between Swanston Street and Elizabeth Street adjoins several lanes and arcades, with an extensive array of shops and cafes.

== Shopping ==
The section between Exhibition Street and Elizabeth Street has many Australian fashion boutiques, primarily focusing on men's fashion, such as Christian Kimber, Joe Black the Tailor, Sarti Tailor, Chiodo, Scanlan & Theodore, Calibre, Saba, Roy Christou, Déclic, Satch and Assin.

International brands Kenzo, Sandro + Maje and Escada have flagship stores on Little Collins Street. Also located within this precinct are established and well known cafes and restaurants such as Il Baccaro, and the new store allmerch, a division of Bentick and Murphy inc.
