= Danielle Whalebone =

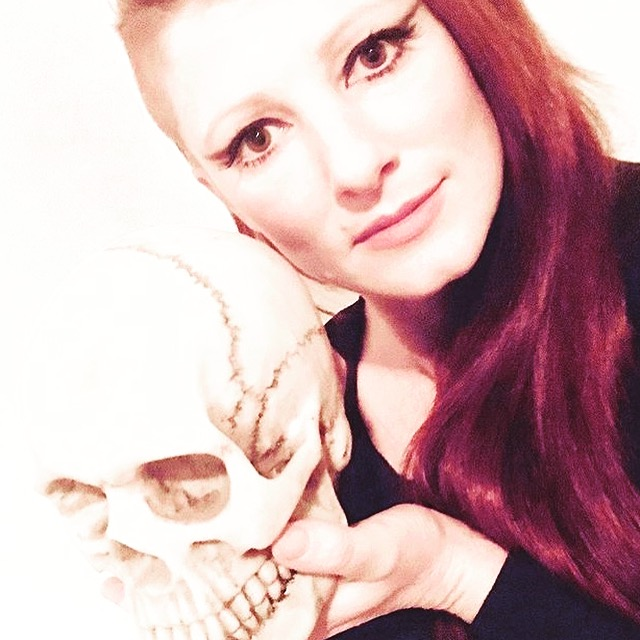

Background information
- Born: Melbourne, Victoria, Australia
- Genres: Alternative rock; Post Punk; Grunge; Pop; Goth
- Occupations: Musician, songwriter
- Instruments: Guitar, vocals
- Years active: 2011–present
- Label: Independent
- Formerly of: Animal Hands

Danielle Whalebone is an Australian rock musician, songwriter and guitarist, best known for forming post-punk band Animal Hands and her subsequent solo career. Whalebone wrote the songs for Animal Hands and received acknowledgment for her songwriting and vocals in the press having been likened to that of PJ Harvey but with a more underground punk/wave vibe. Melbourne's Beat Magazine described Whalebone as possessing a voice that can carry the band, overlaying her fuzzy guitar riffs, a sound very similar to that of Garbage and Magic Dirt. Whalebone states in an interview with What's My Scene Magazine that she is inspired by "unconventional women, poets, writers, film makers and artists". Whalebone gained acclaim for having taken on the daunting task of keeping punk and grunge alive in Melbourne with her distinct early nineties sound. The Dwarf magazine Whalebone was referred to as having the "balls to bring back the grunge". When asked to describe her music Whalebone replies "it's like black truffles because they are found in the dirt but are syrupy sweet" in an interview with 'What's My Scene magazine'.

== Career ==
=== 2011–2013 ===
Whalebone formed Animal Hands in 2011 and began recording an EP with her band in 2012.

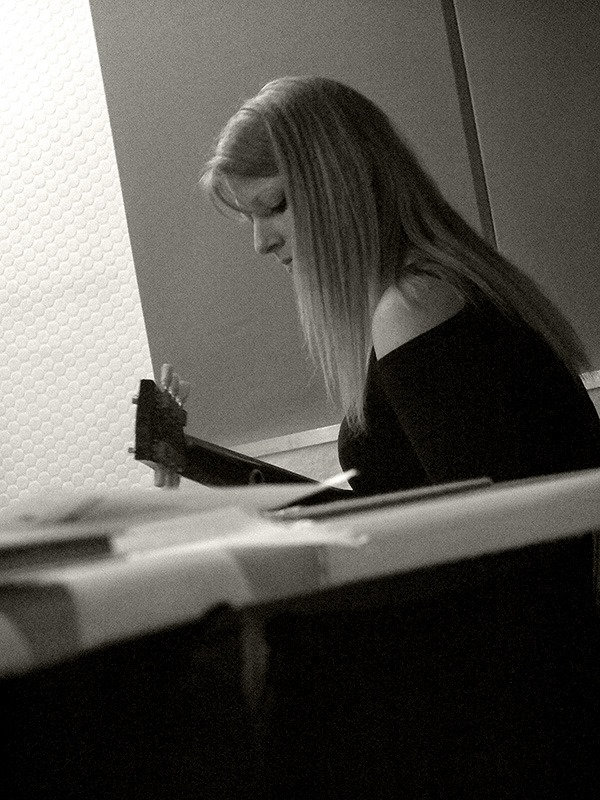
Danielle Whalebone Birdland Studios 2012

The EP was released at Cherry Bar located on ACDC Lane in Melbourne on 19 April 2013. The EP was recorded at Birdland Studios with prestigious producer Lindsay Gravina (Rowland.S Howard, Magic Dirt). The EP featured a cover track written by Matt Johnson (The The) the track was considered comparable to The Kills in a Review by Undercover FM/NEWS. Music reviewer Ali Speers also agreed 'This Is the Day' was 'a stand out cover'. Whalebone was praised for her ability to switch between a sweet as sugar voice and a growl in the track 'Defiance' and for showing all the self-abandonment of a punk rocker in the track "Paper Crown" in a review by The Dwarf Magazine. The first track on the EP 'Defiance' received airplay on radio station RRR 102.7 FM and LA talkback radio. It climbed Australias Triple J Unearthed charts. and received a review in Germanys OX magazine. The EP features the artwork of Lucy Hardie an Australian artist who specializes in fine pen and ink drawings.

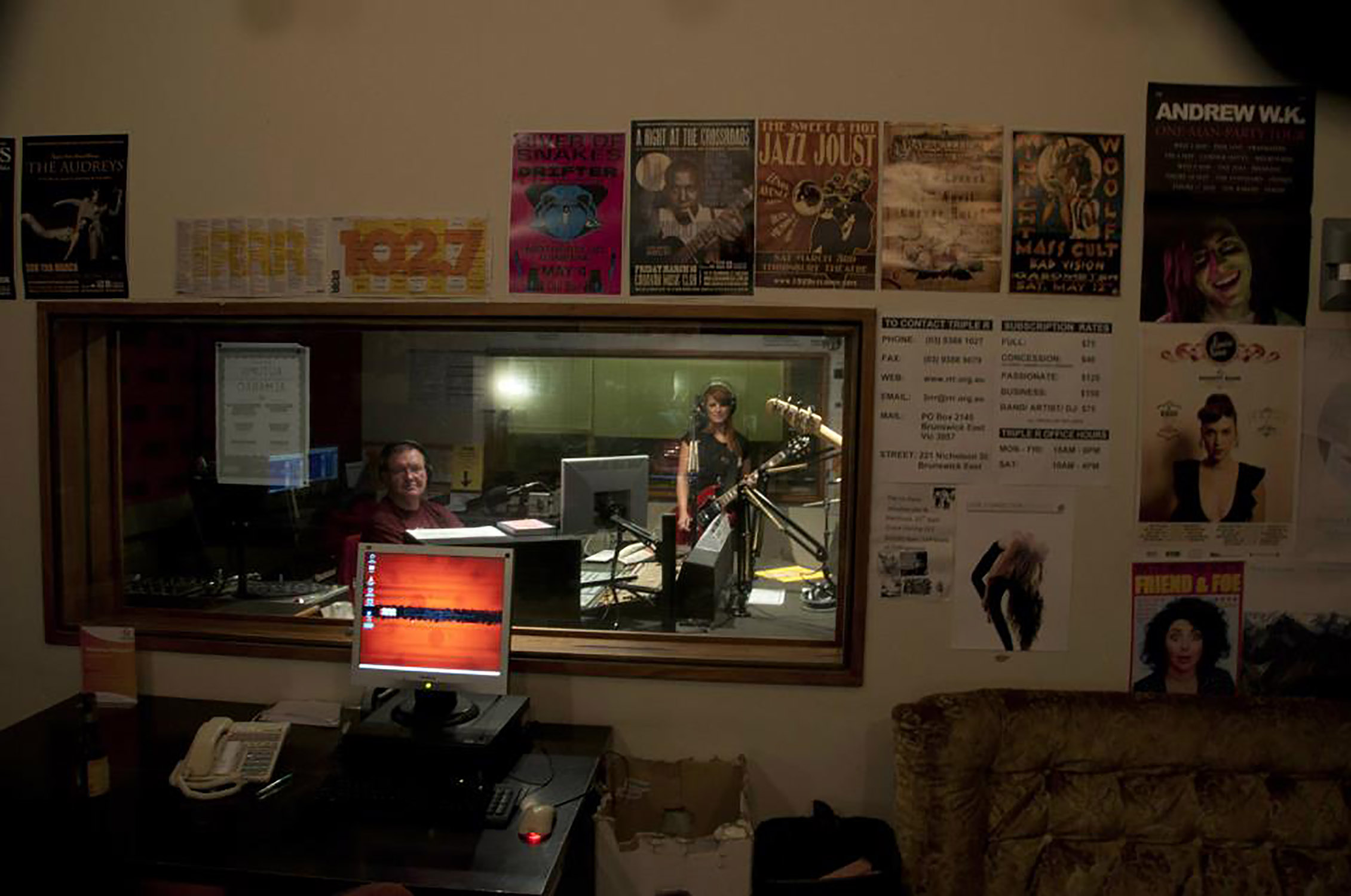
Danielle Whalebone Triple R

=== 2014–2015 ===
After undergoing a sequence of line up changes Whalebone's song "Roaring Girl" was released at Yah Yahs on the 13 September, 'Roaring Girle' is based on the life of Mary Frith, a woman who obtained a reputation as a Virago in the early 17th century. Whalebone was asked in an interview by Beat Magazine what it was like recording at Birdland she states "it was an incredible experience. Lindsay encourages us to push boundaries that we otherwise wouldn't have and as a result, we leave knowing we have given it our very best". 'Roaring Girle' debuted on Australian radio station and the band were special guests on PBS "Go for Broke" hosted by Ken Knievel. The single was also given a spin by presenter Ugly Phil O'Neil on Triple M "Homebrew". Whalebone followed the release with her band's first statewide tour. 'Roaring Girle' received national and international airplay and highly praising reviews. "Grunge is not dead! fronted by Danielle Whalebone has returned and the first single is a killer. "Roaring Girle" deep and hard-hitting. This is a track society has been crying for. Female empowerment at its finest."-Lunney, review Punk Globe Magazine.

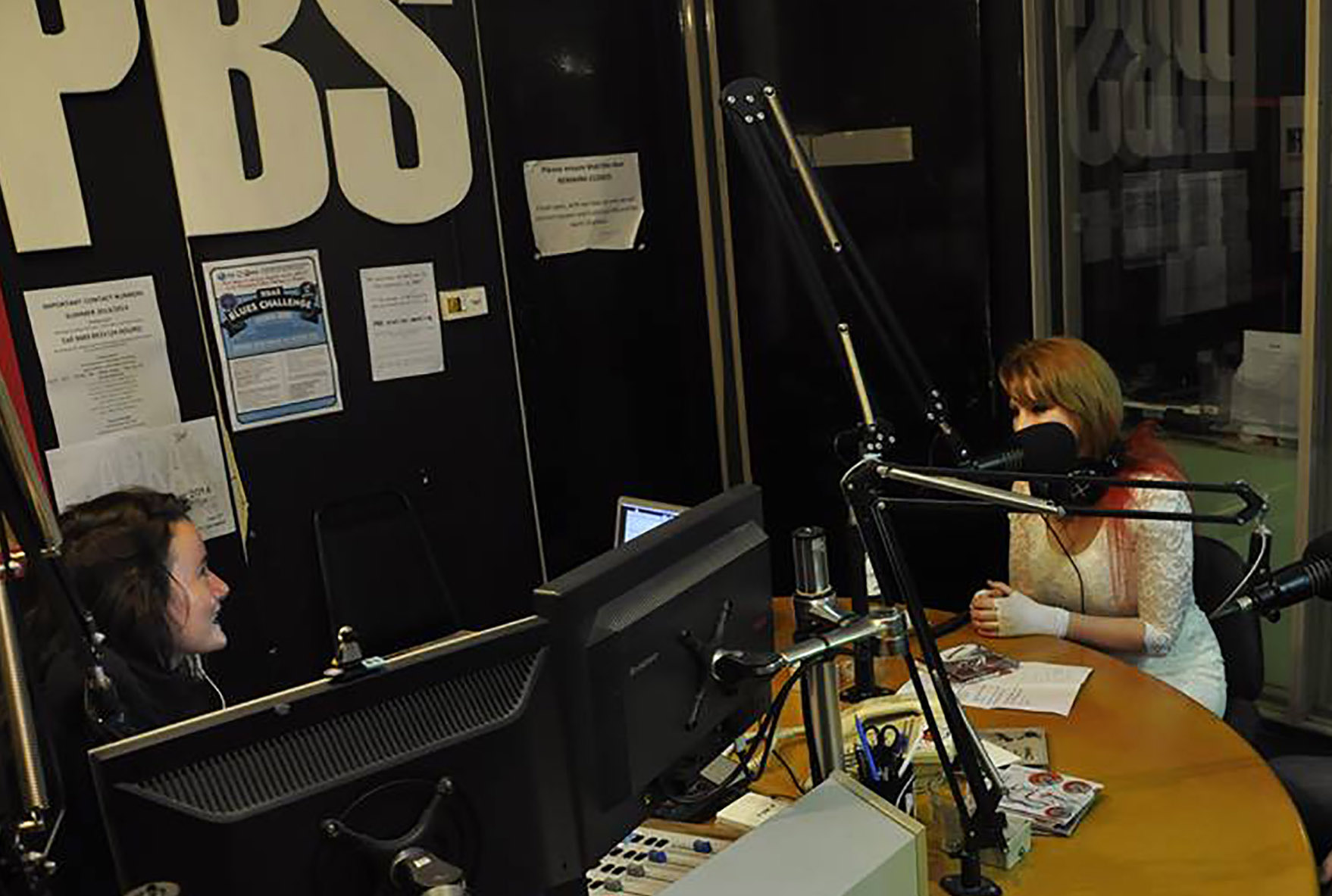
Danielle Whalebone PBS

Danielle's song "Edge of the world" was recorded at Birdland Studios and performed by her band Animal Hands, it was produced by Lindsay Gravina and was engineered by Brenton Conlan. It received airplay on RRR 102.7 FM "Breakfasters" hosted by Sarah Smith, Jeff Sparrow, Geraldine Hickey.

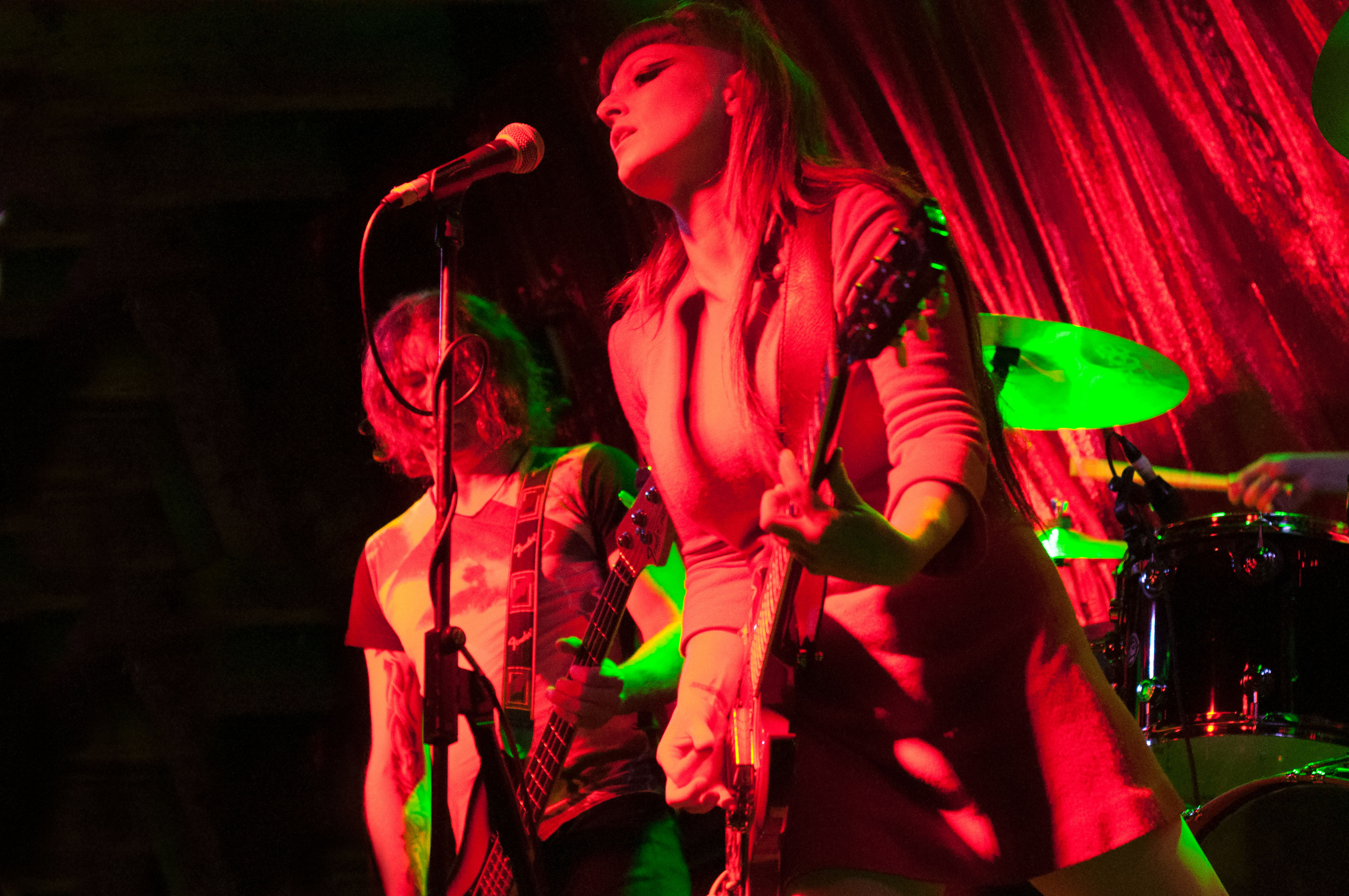
Danielle Whalebone - 'The Troggs World Tour'- Cherry Bar, 2016.

=== 2015–2018 ===
Whalebone hosted several residences for Animal Hands at Cherry Bar and was acknowledged for her work being nominated for Cherry Awards in 2015 and 2016 by Cherry Bar owner James Young. In 2016, Whalebone and her band supported The Troggs at the Cherry Bar. She also supported Dallas Frasca at the Northcote Social Club in 2016. Whalebone recorded the album Tonic Clonic at Birdland studios. Danielle described the experience as "feeling like a mortal amongst immortal giants."- Whalebone, interview Buzz Magazine Australia.

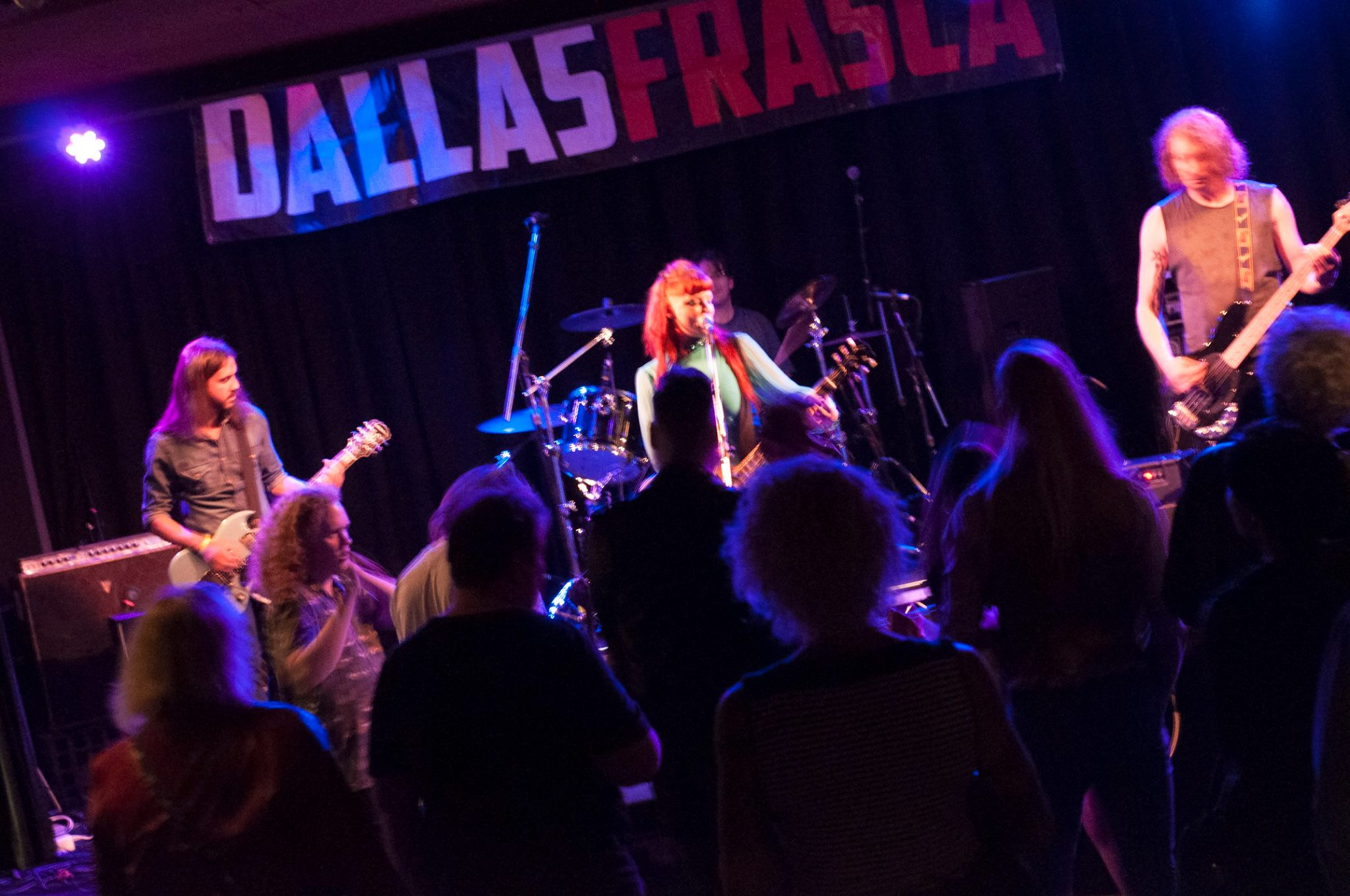
Whalebone's Dallas Frasca World Tour

Whalebone began recording the debut album Tonic Clonic in 2016, it was recorded over the space of two years. There was a lineup change one year into recording and Whalebone was joined by guitarist Kleber Croccia whose previous band "Volver" was featured in Rolling Stone in 2009 whilst playing the festival circuit in Brazil. Whalebone's songwriting was praised for the lead single "Hunger" executive producer Tommy Faith from Triple J radio said 'Hunger' had a "memorable vocal melody through this track and a charm about it that I didn't expect" "Hunger" was released at was released at 'The Tote' Melbourne, its release was promoted by Heavy Magazine in an interview with Danielle.

Whalebone's song "Mirror and The Blade" the second release off her band's album it received a review in New York "Grunge Cake Magazine" and in UK magazine "York Calling". Audiotox reviewed "Lead singer and guitarist Danielle Whalebone channels all our femme-punk favorites, think PJ Harvey-meets-Patti Smith-meet Bats for Lashes. The fuzzy guitar riffs and kick ass yet melancholic vocals create the ultimate nostalgia for those 90s grunge glory days, making us want to reach for our eyeliner and crank up our headphones." Whalebone released "Mirror & The Blade" at The Post Office hotel with special guests The Loveless. Overdrive Magazine promoted the night and gave the single a review. "Wax &Vanity" was the third single released from the album 'Tonic Clonic' Danielle's vocals were described as"sultry and haunting, she feels her words deeply" by Robb Donker writer for 'Americanpancake'. 'Tonic Clonic' was launched at Cherry Bar Friday 13 April 2018 and was followed by an Australian interstate tour with The Mercy Kills. The album received airplay on Triple R, PBS and 4ZZR.

=== 2018–2025 ===
In 2024, Danielle Whalebone released "Whispers of Shadows" a project that marked a significant departure from her earlier songwriting. The LP merges poetic lyricism with experimental soundscapes. Critics widely praised "Whispers of Shadows" for its innovation and emotional depth. Psychedelic Baby Magazine described the LP as "a poetic journey through light and darkness, demonstrating Whalebone’s ability to balance chaos and harmony in her music". While Son of Marketing highlighted its "haunting yet cathartic" sound. The project solidified Whalebone’s reputation as a versatile and boundary-pushing artist. The LP features a blend of alternative rock, experimental, and post-rock influences. The industrial sounds of "Ordinary Things" have a post-apocalyptic menace that contrast with that message and "Through the Keyhole" highlights Whalebone’s ability to craft haunting melodies paired with evocative, poetic lyrics. The instrumentation ranges from minimalist arrangements to layered, atmospheric soundscapes that draw listeners into the album’s emotional core."Whalebone's ability to grasp meaning out of the most commonplace thing gives profound expression is what makes this album great". Beat Magazine called it "a bold and introspective masterpiece," while Start Track praised its "ethereal beauty and emotional resonance." The album is "illuminated by the intermittent glimmers of a sometimes painful but always magnificent lucidity" The album’s experimental sound and themes have resonated with audiences and critics, furthering her reputation.
