= Animal Hands =

Australian rock band

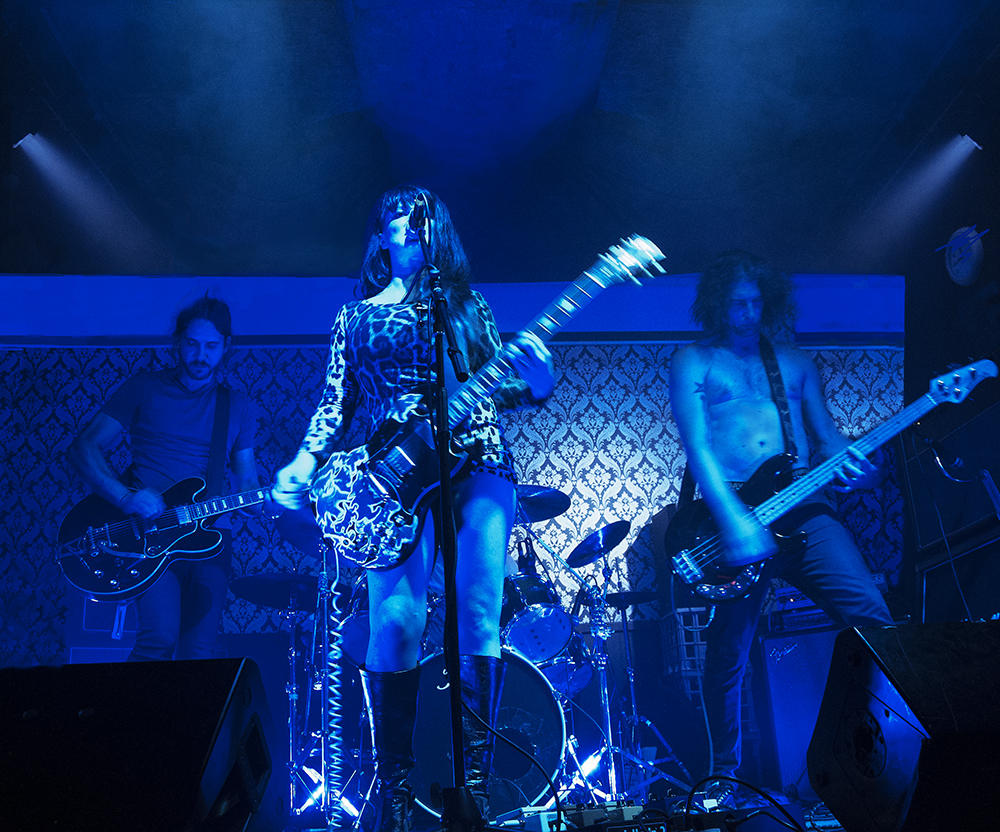
- Animal Hands performing in 2016

Background information
- Origin: Melbourne, Victoria, Australia
- Genres: Alternative rock; Grunge; Punk; stoner rock; hard rock
- Years active: 2011–present
- Label: Independent
- Past members: guitars - Kleber bass - Jamie O'Shea drums- Noosh!
- Website: www.animalhands.net

Animal Hands are an Australian rock band from Melbourne. The band's line-up includes founder and songwriter for the band Danielle Whalebone (lead vocals, guitar), alongside several musicians over the years. The album 'Tonic Clonic' featured Kleber Croccia whose previous band "Volver" was in Rollingstone magazine in 2009 whilst playing the festival circuit in Brazil. and also featured melbourne bass player Jamie O'Shea (Crying Sirens, The Bash Artists) and drummer Noosh! who all contributed to the songwriting.

== History ==
The band was formed by Danielle Whalebone in 2011 and ended in 2018, Animal Hands have been described as a band that has taken on the daunting task of keeping punk and grunge alive with their distinct early nineties sound. Danielle's song writing and vocals have been likened to that of P.J Harvey's but with a more underground punk/wave vibe. She has been regarded as possessing a voice that can carry the band, overlaying her fuzzy guitar riffs. It's a return to the early 90s grunge scene with vigour, a sound very similar to that of Garbage and Magic Dirt. The band has been regarded as having "enough balls to bring back the grunge, fronted by Danielle Whalebone, a woman with all the strength and grace of Adelita Srsen" -Lawler, Review The Dwarf. When asked to describe her music Danielle replies "it's like Black truffles because they are found in the dirt but are syrupy sweet."-Whalebone, interview with What's my scene magazine. The band name "Animal Hands" is derived from Australian crime film titles Animal Kingdom (2010) starring Jacki Weaver as "Smurf" the matriarch of a Melbourne crime family and Two Hands (1999) with Mariel McClorey as Helen who in retaliation for the death of her friend Pete shoots Pando and his gang dead. Danielle states that she is inspired by "unconventional women, poets, writers, film makers and artists" -Whalebone, interview What's my Scene Magazine. Danielle and her band have self-released an EP and two singles featuring the artwork of Lucy Hardie an Australian artist who specialises in fine pen and ink drawings.

=== Debut EP (2013) ===
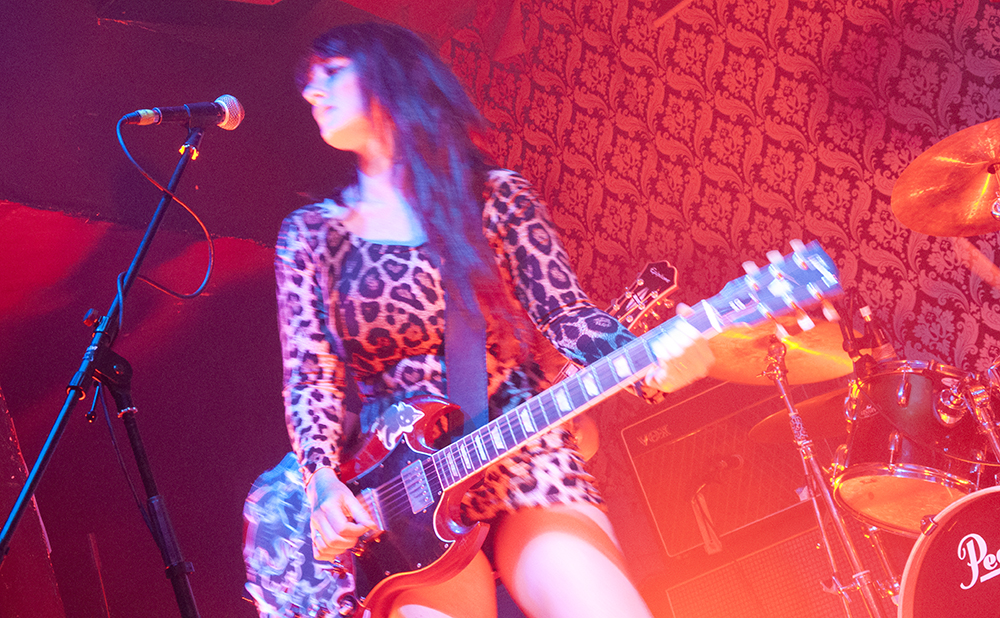
Danielle Whalebone- Last Chance Rock & Roll Bar, 2016.

Animal Hands released their self-titled EP at Cherry Bar located on ACDC Lane in Melbourne on 19 April 2013. The EP was recorded at Birdland Studios in Prahran with prestigious producer Lindsay Gravina (Rowland.S Howard, Magic Dirt). The cover art for the EP features artwork titled "Transmutation operation" by Lucy Hardie.

The EP featured a cover track written by Matt Johnson (The The) that was described as possessing "passion and emotion by the bucket load. The rhythm is less rigid and allows for guitar layering without getting besieged by arrogance. Deep warbling bass notes are the perfect foil for the vocals – which have eerie, murmuring undertones comparable to The Kills" (review Undercover FM/NEWS). Music reviewer Ali Speers of Tone Deaf agreed "This Is the Day" was a stand-out cover, the band's "Garage, grunge sounds working in juxtaposition to front woman Danielle Whalebone's crooning vocals, a great combination". "The opening track, 'Defiance' emphasises Whalebone's ability to switch between a sweet as sugar voice and a growl that you wouldn't wanna fuck with. 'Paper Crown' shows all the self-abandonment of a punk rocker. The striking cover art also deserves a mention, it is both morbid and beautiful much like the music." (Lawler, review The Dwarf Magazine).

The first track on the Animal Hands EP 'Defiance' received airplay on radio station RRR 102.7 FM and LA talk back radio. It climbed Australia's Triple J Unearthed charts, "inspiring anyone who longed for the grunge sound of the nineties to have a listen to "Danielle's deep beautiful voice" (Brummert, review OX-Magazine).

=== Single (2014) ===
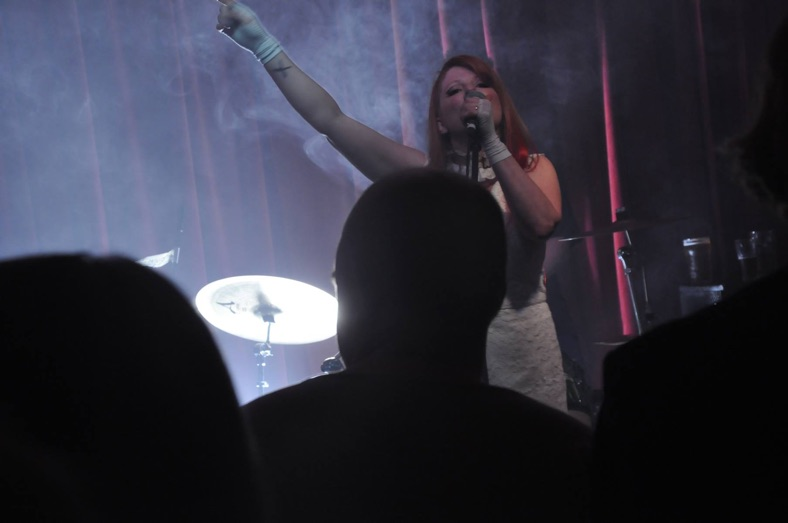
Danielle Whalebone -Yah Yahs, Melbourne. During the 'Roaring Girle Tour' 2014.

After undergoing a sequence of line up changes Danielle was eager to introduce her new band members. 13 September marked the release of Animal Hands single 'Roaring Girle'. The song being based on the life of Mary Frith, a woman who obtained a reputation as a virago in the early 17th century. "My band Animal Hands have just recorded at Birdland Studios with Lindsay Gravina and once again it was an incredible experience. Lindsay encourages us to push boundaries that we otherwise wouldn't have and as a result we leave knowing we have given it our very best". -Whalebone, interview Beat Magazine. 'Roaring Girle' debuted on Australian radio station and the band were special guests on PBS “Go for Broke” hosted by Ken Knievel. The single was also given a spin by presenter Ugly Phil O'Neil on Triple M "Homebrew". Animal hands followed the release with the band's first statewide tour. 'Roaring Girle' received national and international airplay and highly praising reviews. "Grunge is not dead! Animal Hands fronted by Danielle Whalebone has returned and the first single is a killer. "Roaring Girle" pairs the distinct gritty sound of Animal Hands, deep and hard hitting. This is a track society has been crying for. Female empowerment at its finest."-Lunney, review Punk Globe Magazine.

=== Single (2015) ===
Animal Hands single "Edge of the world" was recorded at Birdland Studios, it was produced by Lindsay Gravina and was engineered by Brenton Conlan. It received airplay on RRR 102.7 FM "Breakfasters" hosted by Sarah Smith, Jeff Sparrow, Geraldine Hickey.

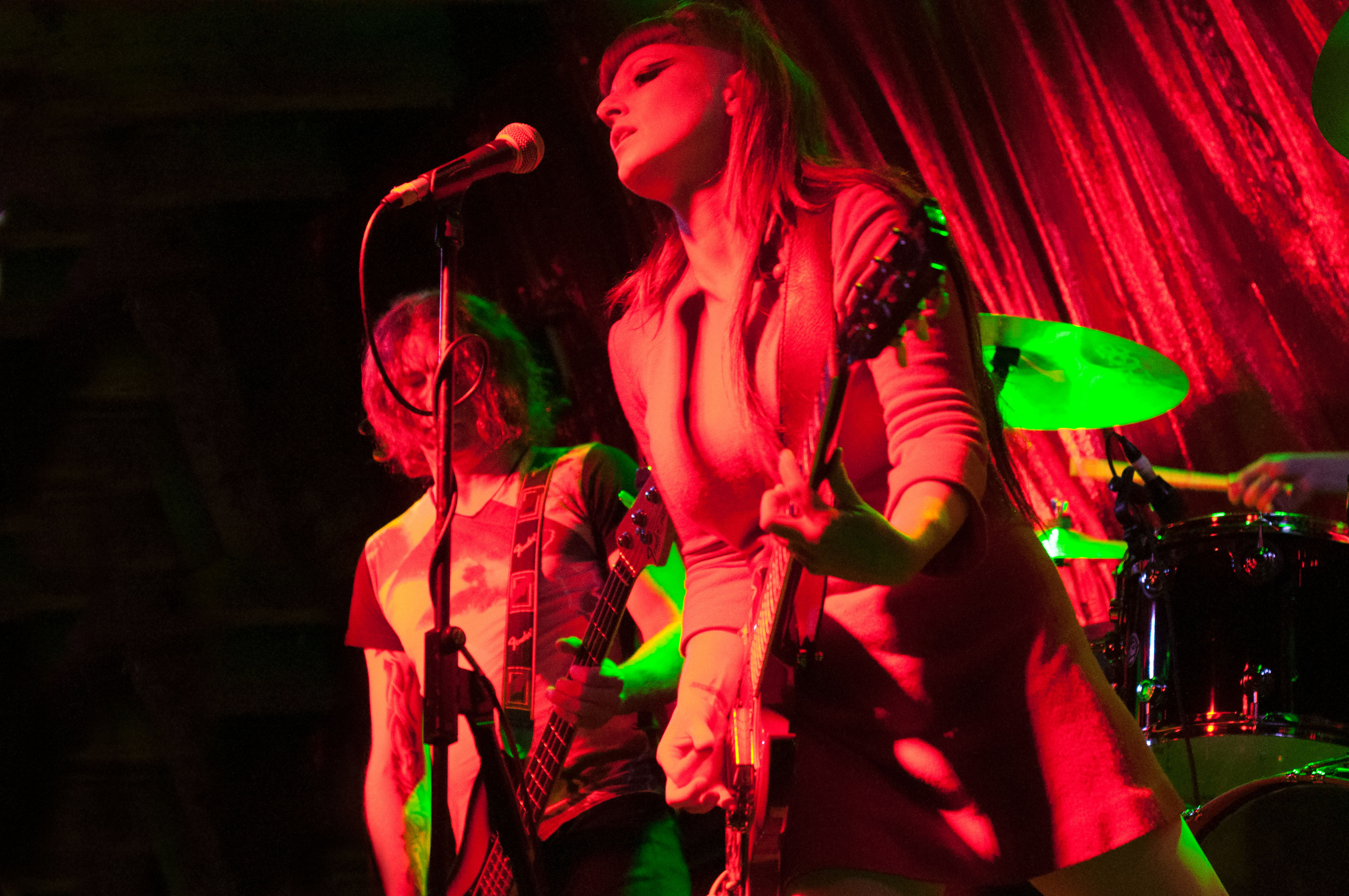
Animal Hands- 'The Troggs Tour'- Cherry Bar, 2016.

=== (2015–2017) ===
Animal Hands were nominated for Cherry Awards in 2015 and 2016 by Cherry Bar owner James Young. In 2016 Animal Hands supported The Troggs at the Cherry Bar. They also supported Dallas Frasca at the Northcote Social Club in 2016. The band began recording their debut album 'Tonic Clonic' at Birdland studios. When asked how was recording at a legendary space like Birdland Studios with a producer like Lindsay Gravina? Danielle replied "The best way to describe it is feeling like a tiny little mortal amongst these immortal giants, but over the course of the album it became like a second home. Never in a million years would I have thought I would have the opportunity to experience a place where so many albums and so many artists that I admire recorded. It's like a pressure cooker, you go in there and come out a different person. Just to be in a space that has housed so much creativity, is hard to let go of and I'm a little sad that it's moving."- Whalebone, interview Buzz Magazine Australia. In February 2017 the band released a behind the scenes insight into the making of their upcoming debut album on their YouTube channel “Get inside the Animal EP 4”. The footage was taken during Rehearsals at Bakehouse studios and whilst recording at Birdland studios.
