= Mulier =

Mulier is a Dutch surname. Notable people with the surname include:

- Pieter Mulier the Elder (ca.1610–1659), Dutch Golden Age painter
- Pieter Mulier II (1637–1701), Dutch Golden Age painter
- Pim Mulier (1865–1954), Dutch speed skater, and a leading figure in the sporting history of the Netherlands
- Rita Mulier (1934–2026), Belgian feminist author and economist

== See also ==
- Hic Mulier, a pamphlet, published in England in 1620
