= Burgomaster =

Archaic term for a mayor

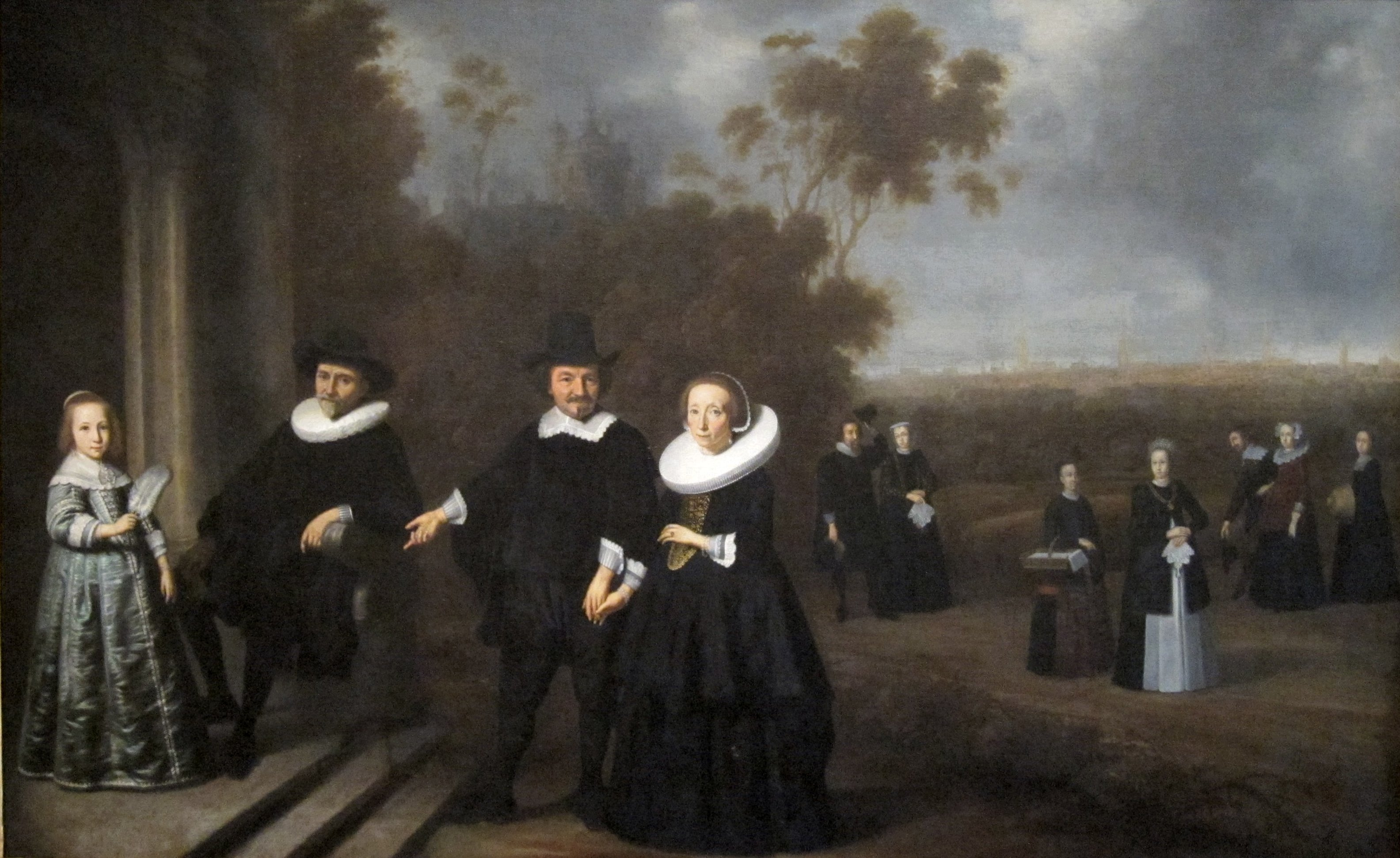
The Burgomaster's Family, possibly painted by Gerard Donck c. 1640

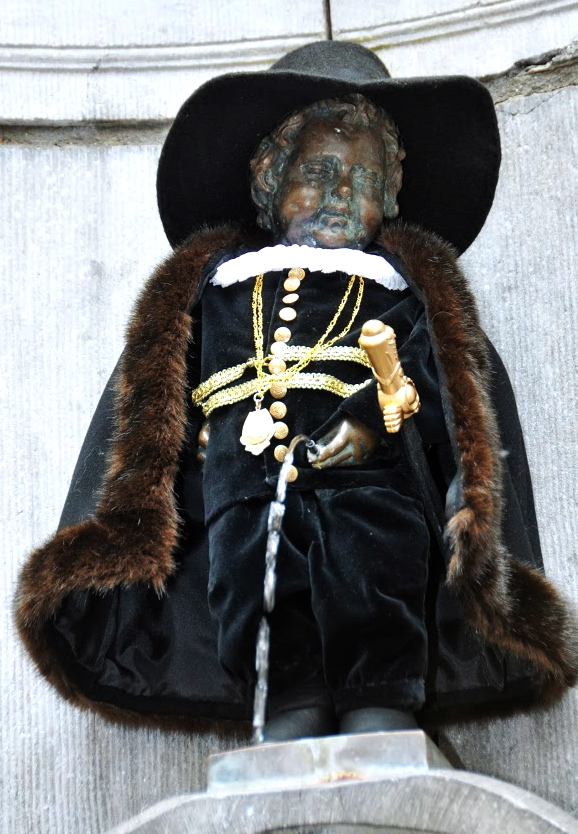
Manneken Pis dressed as a burgomaster from the Seven Noble Houses of Brussels.

Burgomaster (alternatively spelled burgermeister, lit. 'master of the town/borough/fortress/citizens') is the English form of various terms in or derived from Germanic languages for the chief magistrate or executive of a city or town. The name in English was derived from the Dutch burgemeester.

In some cases, burgomaster was the title of the head of state and head of government of a sovereign (or partially or de facto sovereign) city-state, sometimes combined with other titles, such as Hamburg's First Mayor and President of the Senate). Contemporary titles are commonly translated into English as mayor.

== Historical use ==
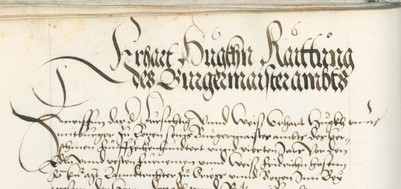
Caption of a Bürgermeisteramt from 1505 (burgomaster Erhart Huck of Bozen, South Tyrol)

- The title "bürgermeister" was first used in the early 13th century.
- In many free imperial cities such as Bremen, Hamburg, and Lübeck, the function of burgomaster was usually held simultaneously by three persons, serving as an executive college. One of the three would be designated burgomaster in chief for a year (called in some cases in German: präsidierender Bürgermeister; in presiding burgomaster), the second being the prior burgomaster in chief, and the third being the upcoming one. Präsidierender Bürgermeister is now an obsolete formulation, but can be found in historical texts up until the 19th century in some cases.
- In an important city, especially in a city state (Stadtstaat), where one of the Bürgermeister has a rank equivalent to that of a minister-president (governor), there can be several posts called Bürgermeister in the city's executive college, justifying the use of a compound title for the actual highest magistrate (also rendered as lord mayor), such as:
  - Regierender Bürgermeister (literally 'governing burgomaster', commonly translated as Mayor, sometimes as "Governing Mayor") in West Berlin and reunited Berlin, while in Berlin the term Bürgermeister without attribute – English Mayor – refers either to the mayor or to the two deputy mayors, and the mayors of the twelve boroughs of Berlin are called Bezirksbürgermeister, English borough mayor.
  - Erster Bürgermeister (literally First Burgomaster) in Hamburg
  - Bürgermeister und Präsident des Senats ('Burgomaster and President of the Senate') in Bremen
- Amtsbürgermeister (German; roughly translated: 'District Burgomaster') can be used for the chief magistrate of a Swiss constitutive canton, as in Aargau 1815–1831 (next styled Landamman).

== Contemporary use ==
=== By jurisdiction ===
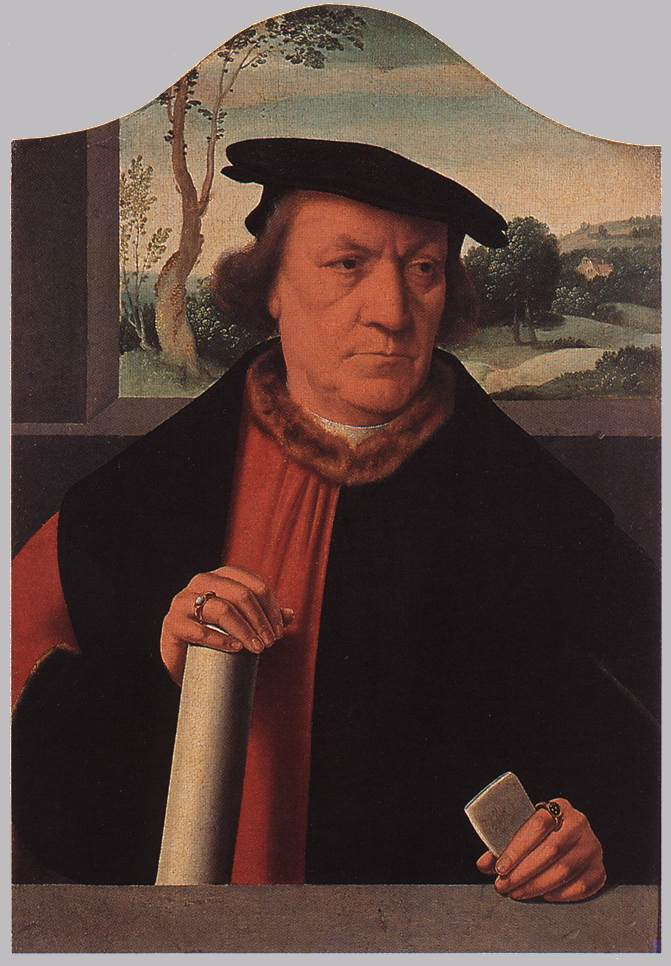
Arnold von Brauweiler, a German burgomaster, known in German as Bürgermeister

- Bürgermeister (literally: 'master of the citizens'), in German: in Germany, Austria, South Tyrol, and formerly in Switzerland. In Switzerland, the title was abolished mid-19th century; various current titles for roughly equivalent offices include Gemeindepräsident, Stadtpräsident, Gemeindeamtmann, and Stadtamtmann.
  - Oberbürgermeister ('Supreme Burgomaster') is the most common version for a mayor in a big city in Germany (it is not in use in Austria). The Ober- (lit. upper) prefix is used in many ranking systems for the next level up including military designations. The mayors of cities, which simultaneously comprise one of Germany's 112 urban districts usually bear this title. Urban districts are comparable to independent cities in the English-speaking world. However, also the mayors of some cities, which do not comprise an urban district, but often used to comprise one until the territorial reforms in the 1970s, bear the title Oberbürgermeister. It is often translated into English as lord mayor.
- Borgmester (Danish) The chairman of the city council and also has the power to officiate non-religious weddings at city hall.
  - Overborgmester similar to Oberbürgermeister is used in the biggest cities where lower offices are Borgmester of a specific subject (such as schools or roads), similar to ministers in a national government.
  - Amtsborgmester was previously used for the chairmen of the councils larger districts (that included multiple cities) that were known as Amter.
  - Regionsborgmester is now unofficially used for the chairpeople of the even larger Regioner that correspond to even larger areas similar to what was historically ruled by an Earl (Jarl). The entire country (excluding the Faroe Islands and Greenland) consists of only 4 to 5 Regioner.
- Borgarstjóri (Icelandic and Faroese)
- Borgermester (Norwegian (Bokmål))
- Börgermester (Low German)
- Burgomaestre (Spanish)
- Purkmistr (Czech)
- Burgumaisu (Basque)
- Borgomastro or Sindaco-Borgomastro (Italian): in few communes of Lombardy
- Burgemeester (Dutch); in Belgium a party-political post, though formally nominated by the regional government and answerable to it, the federal state and even the province. Mayor. In the Netherlands nominated by the municipal council but appointed by the crown. In theory above the parties, in practice a high-profile party-political post.
- Bourgmestre (French) in Belgium, Luxembourg and the Democratic Republic of the Congo
- Burgomestre (Portuguese)
- Bürgermeister (Estonian)
- Burmistras (Lithuanian), derived from German.
- Buergermeeschter (Luxembourgish)
- Polgármester (Hungarian), derived from German.
- Burmistrz (Polish), a mayoral title, derived from German. The German form Oberbürgermeister ('Supreme Burgomaster') is often translated as Nadburmistrz. The German-derived terminology reflects the involvement of German settlers in the early history of many Polish towns.
- Borgmästare, kommunalborgmästare (Swedish); the title is not used in Sweden in present times, the closest equivalent being kommunalråd (often translated to English as Municipal commissioner) or borgarråd (only in Stockholm City).
- Boargemaster (West Frisian)
- Pormestari (Finnish)
- Бурмістр (Ukrainian); presently unofficial, usage limited to certain western Ukrainian dialects. Derived from German via Polish usage.
- Бурмістр (Belarusian); used in Podlaskie Voivodeship.
- Bùrméster (Kashubian)

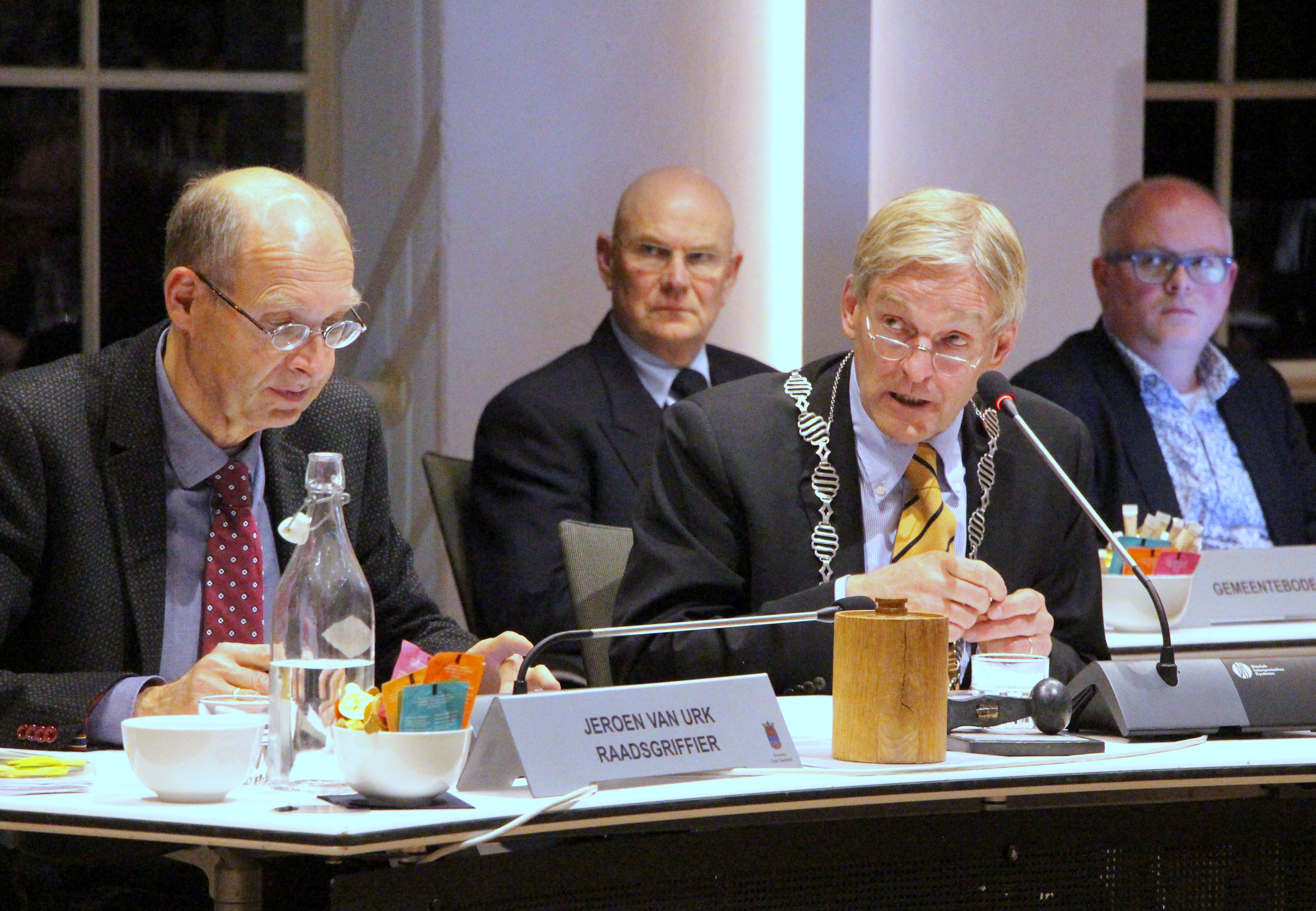
Session of the council of the community Oude IJsselstreek, eastern Netherlands: mayor Steven de Vreeze (right) as chairman of the council.

=== Low Countries ===
In the Netherlands and Belgium, the mayor (Dutch: burgemeester or French: bourgmestre) is an appointed government position, whose main responsibility is chairing the executive and legislative councils of a municipality.

In the Netherlands, mayors chair both the council of mayor and aldermen and the municipal council. They are members of the council of mayor and aldermen (Dutch: college van burgemeester en wethouders, B&W) and have their own portfolios, always including safety and public order. They also have a representative role for the municipal government, both to its civilians and to other authorities on the local, regional and national level.

A large majority of mayors are members of a political party. This can be the majority party in the municipal council, but there are many exceptions on this. However, the mayors are expected to exercise their office in a non-partisan way.

The mayor is appointed by the national government (the Crown) for a renewable six-year term. In the past, mayors for important cities were often chosen after negotiations (behind the scenes) between the national parties. This appointment procedure has been criticised because it was seen by some as undemocratic. Especially the party D66 had a direct election of the mayor as one of the main objectives in its platform. In the early 2000s, proposals for change were discussed in the national parliament. However, opponents of the status quo were divided between two alternatives: direct election of the mayor by the people or appointment by the municipal council. A constitutional change to direct election gained a majority in both chambers but failed to pass the final vote in the Senate in March 2005.

In the meantime, although the law remained the same, the practice changed. Nowadays, when a vacancy occurs, a special committee of the municipal council interviews (behind closed doors) candidates, which are pre-selected by the provincial governor (the king's commissioner). After advice by the committee, the council express its preferences to the minister of the interior, who almost always follows this recommendation.
