= Frans de Hulst =

Dutch Golden Age painter

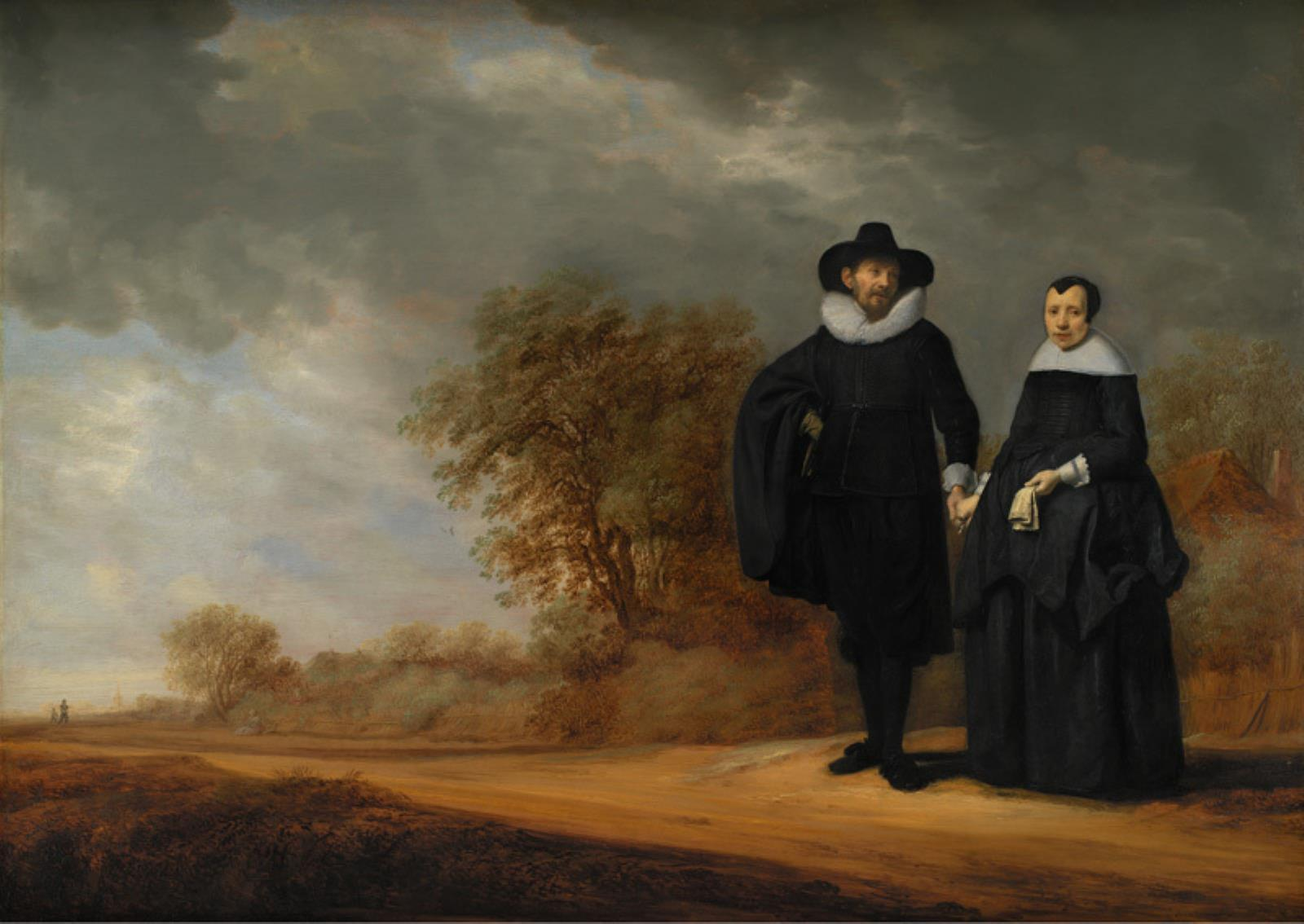
Burgomaster Cornelis Damasz van der Gracht and his Wife, Jopken Jacobs, in a Landscape, by Gerard Donck (figures) and Frans de Hulst (landscape) — c. 1635

Frans de Hulst (1610–1661) was a Dutch Golden Age painter.

== Biography ==
According to the RKD he was a pupil of Pieter Mulier I and became a member of the Haarlem Guild of St. Luke in 1631. He is known for beach scenes and landscapes in the manner of Salomon van Ruysdael and Jan van Goyen. He was born and died in Haarlem.

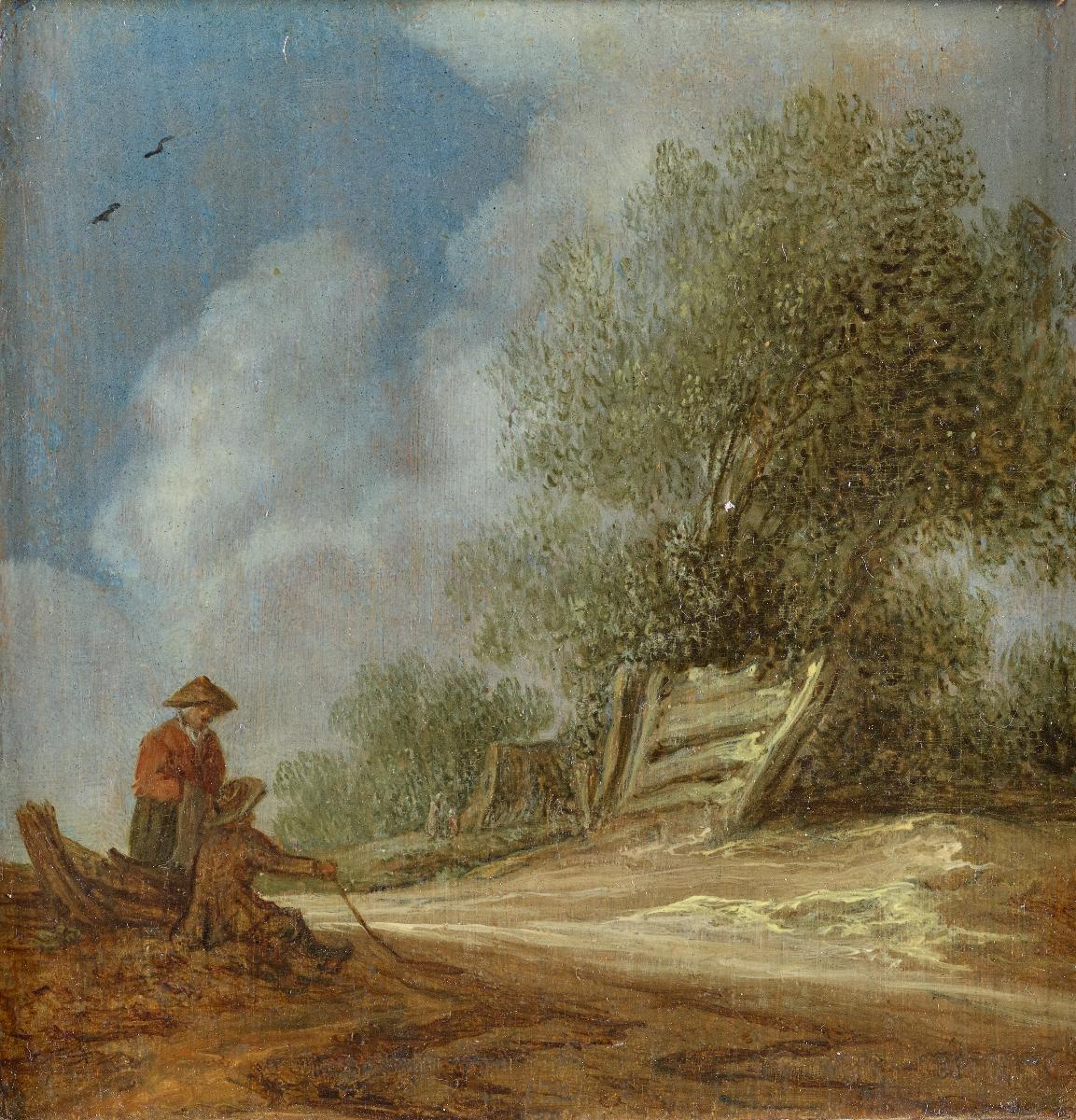
