= Haec-Vir =

Pamphlet published in 1620 in England

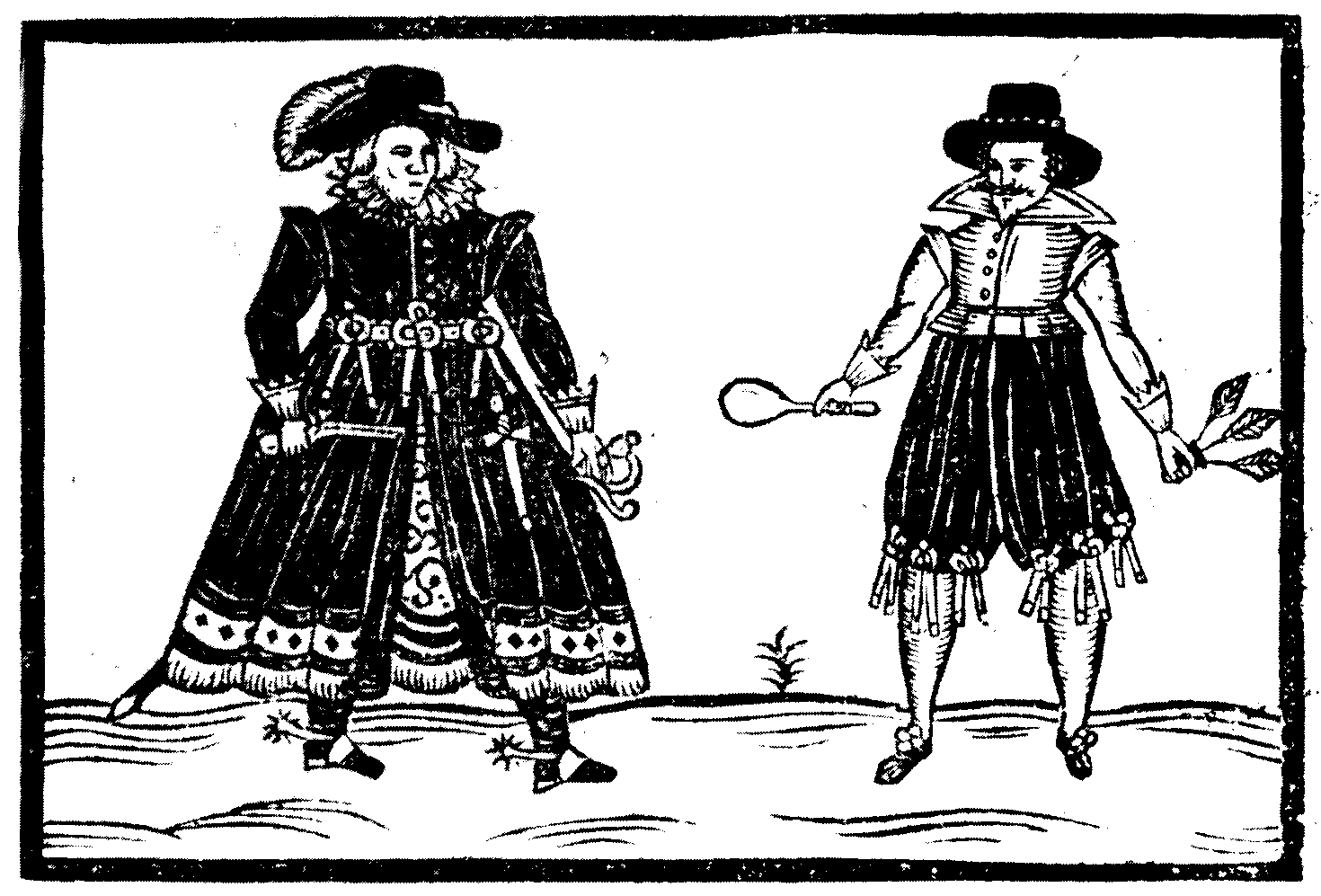
Illustration of the Womanish Man and the Man-Woman from Haec-Vir

Haec-Vir: or, the Womanish-Man was a pamphlet published in 1620 in England in response to the pamphlet Hic Mulier. Where Hic Mulier argued against cross-dressing, and more broadly women's rights, Haec-Vir defended those women who did not fit their expected gender role. The title (pronounced [hɛk vɜːr] in English Latin pronunciation) literally means "This [effeminate] Man" – haec being the feminine form of the demonstrative pronoun jokingly applied to the masculine noun. The pamphlet is designed as a dialogue between Hic Mulier (The Man-Woman, a female transvestite) and Haec-Vir (The Womanish Man, an effeminate man). The pamphlet is notable as an early expression of feminism in the Renaissance. Hic Mulier seems to abandon some of her previous ideals by stating that the only reason women are "overstepping their bounds" is because men have ceased to be "real men".

== The work ==
The pamphlet, printed by Eliot's Court Press for John Trundle in 1620, was sold at Christ Church gate in London, by bookseller Edward Wright. It appears to have been printed only once during the period. As a polemical riposte to Hic Mulier, it follows the outlines of the earlier pamphlet fairly closely.

The text opens with Haec-Vir, a dandy, mistaking the masculine Hic-Mulier for a knight. They clear up this mistake with a profusion of courtly language. Haec-Vir accuses the mannish woman of baseness, unnaturalness, shamefulness, and foolishness: he grounds his argument in traditional assumptions about social order and gender decorum. She replies, at first, with an argument for her own freedom as a human and for the relativism necessary in judging mutable customs. Her assertions, bolstered by quotations from Martial and Virgil, among others, are not in themselves less traditional than Haec-Vir's; their application to the question of women's freedom, however, may be considered somewhat uncommon for the period. Haec-Vir replies by referring to Deuteronomy's injunction against transvestism. This reference proves decisive as regards Hic-Mulier's early argument; however, she instantly attacks Haec-Vir for his own effeminacy—a charge which, given his earlier attack, he cannot refute. The brief colloquy ends with their mutual resolution to return to normative gender standards for behavior.

== Context ==
In the last decade of James I's reign, England appears to have witnessed a minor crisis of conscience over the issue of cross-dressing and other activities supposed to violate gender norms. It is possible that this crisis related to actual changes in behavior; Mary Frith, for instance, had recently achieved notoriety. However, such a trend in society has proven difficult to determine precisely.

What is clear is that a number of social and political developments made cross-dressing more threatening. The perception of political corruption and homosexuality at court on the one hand, and the rising intolerance and vehemence of the Puritans on the other, contributed to a heavily polarized social scene in which tolerance or compromise became progressively more difficult. As regards women, scandals such as the murder of Thomas Overbury revealed some women in a light that was conducive to misogynistic fears. As regards men, the long era of peace enforced by James's foreign policy was assumed to lead to "soft" men; there was, for some English people, a noted contrast between the delicate Jacobean courtier and the idealized martial courtier remembered from Elizabeth I's day. Finally, the promulgation of the Statutes of Apparel in 1574 may have served to remind some English people of the traditional limits on freedom of dress.

Because Haec Vir followed so quickly after the printing of Hic Mulier, scholar L. B. Wright believes the pair of pamphlets was designed by the bookseller to capitalize on controversy over the social position of women.

== See also ==
- Hic Mulier
- Masculinity
- List of transgender-related topics
