= Corporation Lane =

Default name for lanes in Melbourne, Victoria

In the City of Melbourne, Australia, many minor laneways are given the default name Corporation Lane. Often these laneways do not appear in street directories. Some have been renamed to something novel or commemorative, including ACDC Lane, and Menzies Lane.

Because of the number of thoroughfares named Corporation Lane they are identified by number. For example, the lane that became Menzies Lane was previously listed as Corporation Lane (No. 1161). A 2004 article in The Age reported that "of the 1556 laneways in the City of Port Phillip, for example, most are numbered but few are named."

== See also ==
- "What's in a Name? The Lanes of East Melbourne." East Melbourne Historical Society. 2008.
