= The Roaring Girl =

Jacobean stage play written by Thomas Middleton and Thomas Dekker, published 1611

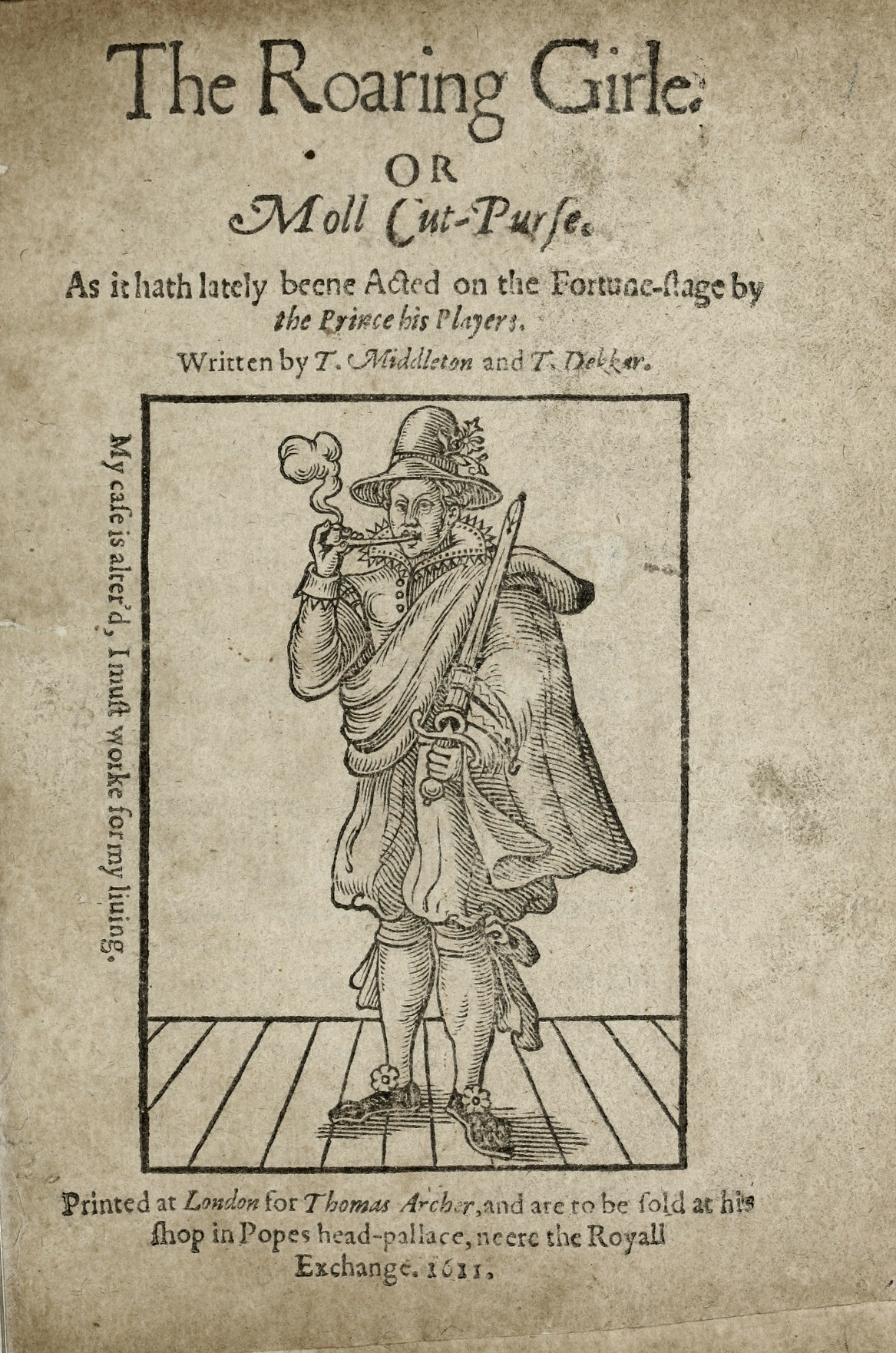
Title page of the first edition (1611)

The Roaring Girl is a Jacobean stage play, a comedy written by Thomas Middleton and Thomas Dekker.

The play was probably written c. 1610 and first published in 1611 in a quarto printed by Nicholas Okes for the bookseller Thomas Archer. The title page of the first edition states that the play was performed at the Fortune Theatre by the Prince's Players, the troupe known in the previous reign as the Admiral's Men. In the preface Middleton states that he composed his plays for readers as well as theatre audiences.

The Roaring Girl is a fictionalized dramatization of the life of Mary Frith, known as "Moll Cutpurse", a woman who had gained a reputation as a virago in the early 17th century. (The term "roaring girl" was adapted from the slang term "roaring boy", which was applied to a young man who caroused publicly, brawled, and committed petty crimes.) She was also the subject of a lost chapbook written by John Day titled The Mad Pranks of Merry Moll of the Bankside, which was entered into the Stationers' Register on 7 August 1610. Frith also appears in Nathaniel Field's Amends for Ladies, which dates from this same era of c. 1611. On the basis of documents from a surviving lawsuit, the actual Mary Frith seems to have been the type of person that Middleton and Dekker depicted. The real Mary Frith may have even stepped in once to play her own part as Moll in a performance of The Roaring Girl at the Fortune Theatre.

== Characters ==
- Moll – the Roaring Girl
- Sebastian Wengrave – a cunning young man, wants to marry Mary Fitz-Allard regardless of her social status
- Sir Alexander Wengrave – Sebastian's overbearing father who will let him marry only a woman with a large dowry
- Mary Fitz-Allard – a young woman
- Sir Guy Fitz-Allard – Mary's father
- Neatfoot – Sir Alexander's man
- Trapdoor – a spy
- Sir Adam Appleton
- Sir Davy Dapper – father of Jack Dapper
- Sir Beauteous Ganymede
- Lord Noland
- Jack Dapper – son of Sir Davy Dapper
- Gull – Jack Dapper's page
- Laxton – a gallant
- Goshawk – a gallant
- Greenwit – a gallant
- Tiltyard – a feather-seller
- Openwork – a sempster
- Gallipot – an apothecary
- Mistress Gallipot – Gallipot's wife, has an affair with Laxton

== Synopsis ==
=== Act I ===
==== Scene 1: Sebastian's chambers in Sir Alexander's house ====
Mary Fitz-Allard and Sebastian are in love, but their fathers will never permit the union, as Mary's father (Sir Guy) demands too large a dowry from Sebastian's father (Sir Alexander) for Mary's hand in marriage. However, Sebastian has a plan to enable the match: he will pretend to be in love with Moll Cutpurse, a notorious cross-dressing thief, and his father will be so worried that he will see marriage to Mary as the preferable alternative.

==== Scene 2: The parlour of Sir Alexander's house ====
Sebastian's father is worried about his son pursuing a grotesque "man-woman". Sebastian pretends to be outraged, and asks if his father would be happy if he married Mary instead. His father says no. Sir Alexander calls the spy and parasite Trapdoor, and sets him to follow Moll, get into her service, and find a way to destroy her. Trapdoor agrees.

=== Act II ===
==== Scene 1: The three shops open in a rank ====
A scene in the street. Various gallants are talking to the shopkeepers and flirting with their wives. The gallant Laxton flirts with Mistress Gallipot in the tobacco-shop. He does not actually like her much, but is keeping her on a string in order to get money from her to take other girls out. Jack Dapper, a young profligate, enters to buy a feather to show off with. Moll enters and Laxton takes a fancy to her, assuming that because she dresses as a man, she is morally loose. Laxton courts Moll; she agrees to meet him at Gray's Inn Fields at 3 PM. Trapdoor then presents himself to Moll and offers to be her servant. She is dubious but agrees to meet him in Gray's Inn Fields a bit after 3 PM.

==== Scene 2: A street ====
Sebastian's father is spying on him at home. Moll enters and Sebastian woos her. She is polite but rebuffs him: she is chaste and will never marry. He says he will try again later. She exits and Sir Alexander rebukes his son, saying that Moll will disgrace him because she is a whore and a thief. Sebastian says that there is no proof of those accusations. Sir Alexander exits, still more resolved to publicly shame Moll. Sebastian decides that he must confess his plan to her in hopes that he will get her to help him and Mary.

=== Act III ===
==== Scene 1: Gray's Inn Fields ====
Laxton enters for his rendezvous with Moll. She appears dressed as a man; he goes towards her but she challenges him to a fight: he has impugned her honor, assuming that all women are whores. He is wrong to assume so—and also wrong to treat whoring lightly, as it is a sin that many good women are forced to, for lack of an alternative. They fight and she wounds him; he retreats and exits, shocked. Trapdoor enters. Moll teases and taunts him, but she finally accepts that his motives are good and agrees to take him on as her servant.

==== Scene 2: Gallipot's house ====
Mistress Gallipot is continuing her covert affair with Laxton, which her husband does not suspect. He has sent her a letter asking for a loan of thirty pounds, which she does not have. She formulates a plan, tearing the letter and wailing. She tells Gallipot that Laxton is an old suitor, to whom she was betrothed before they married. She thought him dead, but now he has returned to claim his wife. Gallipot is horrified, as he loves his wife and has had children by her. She suggests buying Laxton off with thirty pounds and he agrees. Laxton enters. Mrs. Gallipot quickly apprises him of the situation and Gallipot offers him the money. Feigning anger at the loss of his "betrothed," he takes it and exits, musing on the deceitfulness of women.

==== Scene 3: Holborn Street ====
Trapdoor tells Sir Alexander what he has learned: Sebastian and Moll plan to meet at 3 o'clock in his (Sir Alexander's) chamber to have sex. They decide to trap her. Meanwhile, Sir Davy Dapper talks to Sir Alexander about his son, Jack, who is still wild and profligate, whoring, drinking, and gambling. Sir Davy has decided to teach his son a lesson: he will arrange to have Jack arrested, trusting a few days in the counter (the debtor's prison) to bring him to his senses. The sergeants enter and Sir Davy (pretending not to be Jack's father) gives them their instructions. Jack and his servant Gull enter, and are about to be set on by the sergeants; but Moll, who has been watching, warns him away. Jack escapes, and Moll mocks the police, who can do nothing.

=== Act IV ===
==== Scene 1: Sir Alexander's chamber ====
Sir Alexander and Trapdoor await Moll and Sebastian. Sir Alexander lays out diamonds and gold in the hope that Moll will try to steal them. Sebastian and Moll enter with Mary Fitz-Allard (who is disguised as a page). Moll, in on the plan, aims to help them. She plays on the viol and sings. She then sees the jewels but only comments on them, rather than stealing them.

==== Scene 2: Openwork's house ====
The citizens' wives discuss the gallants, agreeing that they don't really understand life, women, or relationships. A young man enters pretending to have a legal document calling the Gallipots to court for breach of contract. This is Laxton's doing—after the thirty pounds, he demanded another fifteen, and now he is asking for a hundred in order to hold his peace. Mistress Gallipot is shocked. Her husband wants to pay Laxton off again, but she feels forced by the enormity of the sum to confess that all this was a lie, that she was never betrothed to Laxton. Gallipot asks for an explanation. Laxton "confesses" that he had courted Gallipot's wife but had been refused, but that she promised she would always help Laxton out if he were in need; thus they concocted this story to get money. Gallipot believes them; Laxton is not punished, but ends up being their guest for dinner.

=== Act V ===
==== Scene 1: A street ====
Moll tells Jack how she saved him from the sergeants and he thanks her. He knows that his father set the law on him, and is amused at the idea that time in jail would cure him, when in fact jail just teaches people how to be worse. Moll has grown to suspect Trapdoor's honesty and has discharged him. Trapdoor enters, disguised as a soldier, but Moll sees through him. A gang of cutpurses enters to try to rob them, but Moll sees them off: she is known and feared by all rogues. Moll explains that she thinks it her duty to protect the honest through her knowledge of London's low-lifes.

==== Scene 2: Sir Alexander's house ====
Sir Alexander hears that his son and Moll have fled to get married. Sir Guy, Mary's father, gently mocks Sir Alexander, saying it is his fault for opposing the match with Mary. Sir Guy then offers to wager all his lands, against half of Sir Alexander's, that Sebastian and Moll will not wed. Sir Alexander takes the bet, declaring that anyone in the world but Moll would make a welcome daughter-in-law. A servant announces Sebastian and his bride; he enters, hand in hand with Moll. Sir Alexander is horrified, but demands Sir Guy's lands. The trick is then revealed: Mary is brought in as Sebastian's bride. Sir Alexander, vastly relieved, apologizes to both Mary and her father, and happily grants half his lands to the happy couple. Moll, asked when she will marry, says she never will. Trapdoor enters to confess that he was set on her by Sir Alexander, who promises never again to value someone according to public opinion.

== Authorship ==
Critics and scholars who have attempted to differentiate the shares of the two collaborators in the play have not reached a full consensus, though the general tendency has been to attribute the romantic main plot of Mary Fitz-Allard largely to Dekker, and the Moll Cutpurse subplot mainly to Middleton. David Lake, in his study of authorship problems in Middleton's canon, produces the following division of authorship.

Dekker: Act I; Act III, scenes ii–iii; Act IV, scene ii; Act V, scene i;
Middleton: Act II; Act III, scene i; Act IV, scene i; Act V, scene ii.

Lake also favours the view of Fredson Bowers that the play was printed from a manuscript in Dekker's autograph. Paul Mulholland emphasizes that "most scenes reveal evidence of both dramatists", while "Few scenes point conclusively to either dramatist as the main writer". He quotes with approval Cyrus Hoy's observation that "the designation 'Middleton and Dekker' is the only one appropriate for much of the play".

== Analysis ==
There is much speculation surrounding the impact of Moll Cutpurse's character within The Roaring Girl. Critics have discussed how she shapes gender relations, and how she represents a woman's situation in Early Modern England. Because she is a "man-woman", scholars have debated over Middleton and Dekker's use of this construct. The contradictory ideals Moll exposes throughout the play challenge her reputation and whether her ill-repute is deserved or not. Moll's male attire upholds her "female" modesty by literally covering her body. Her male attitude creates an identity of immorality regarding women having a male libido. Yet, she is chaste and not interested in pursuing relations with men (which is not to say that she is asexual necessarily). Her negative reputation is seemingly not deserved but is upheld throughout the play.

The Royal Shakespeare Company performed the play in 2014, with Lisa Dillon as Moll, and named a season of plays after it.

== See also ==
- Hic Mulier - a pamphlet published in 1620 in England that condemned cross-dressing.
- Haec-Vir - another pamphlet in response
