= Hic Mulier =

Pamphlet published in 1620 in England

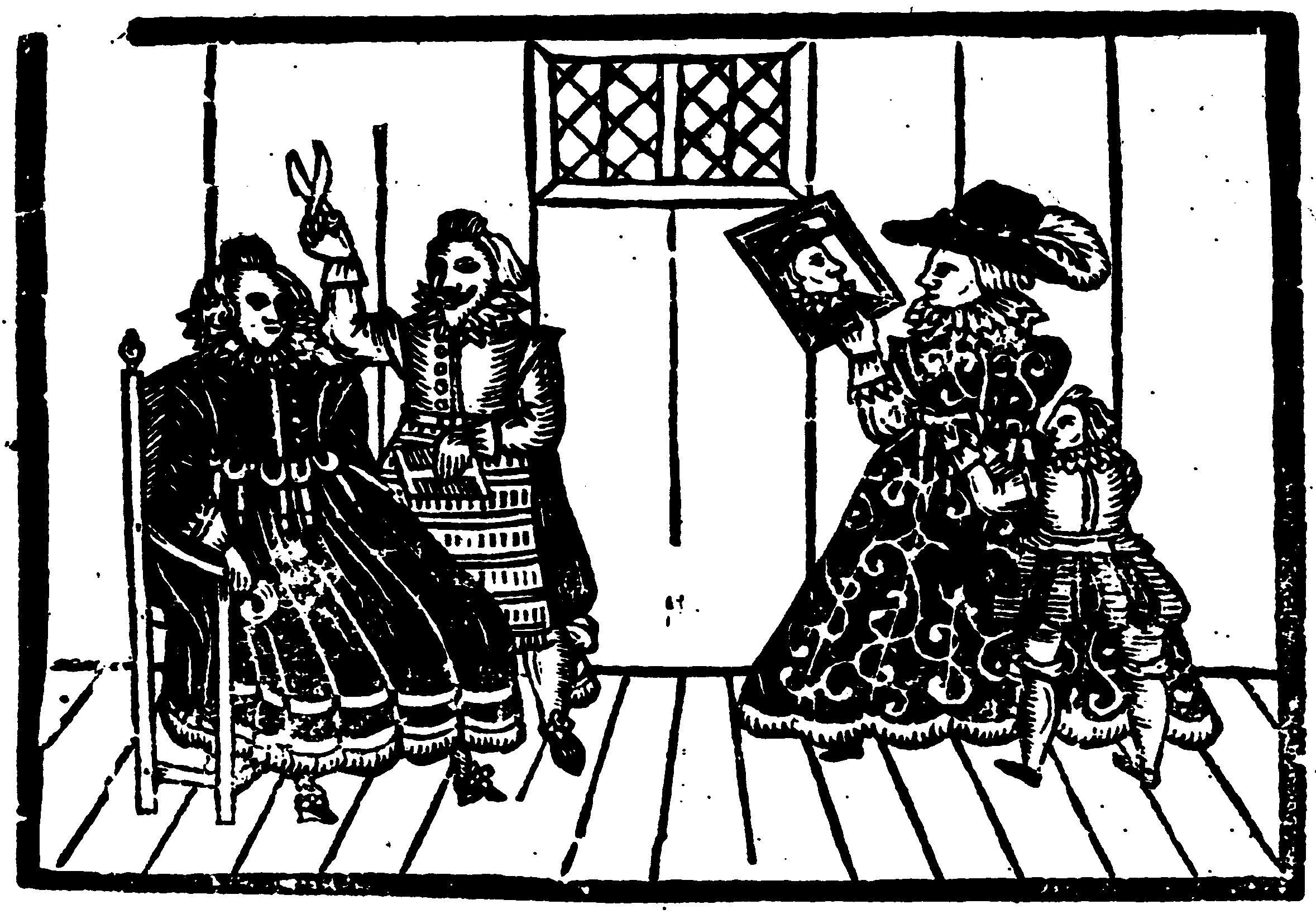
Hic Mulier title page illustration

Hic Mulier: or, The Man-Woman is a pamphlet published in 1620 in England that condemned cross-dressing. The pamphlet expresses concern about women wearing men's apparel. It makes a socially conservative argument that transvestitism was an affront to nature, The Bible, the great chain of being, and society. The Latin title uses the word hic, the masculine form of the demonstrative pronoun jokingly applied to a feminine noun, to mean "this [manlike] woman".

== Context ==
During the last few years of King James's reign, women were accused of dressing and behaving like men. This occurrence was relatively small-scale and brief. The term Hic Mulier, used as a sexual insult, was introduced by a preacher named Thomas Adams in a pamphlet he published in 1615. King James commented on the fashion of women dressing in men's clothing. In 1620, he commanded his clergy to teach, "against the insolencie of our women, and their wearing of broad brimmed hats, pointed dublets, their hair cut short or shorn, and some of them stilettoes or poinards, and such other trinckets of like moment." Hic Mulier and the responding pamphlet Haec Vir were outcomes of his command.

Hic Mulier was followed quickly by the printing of the counterpoint Haec Vir, indicating the pair of pamphlets was likely intended by the bookseller to capitalize on controversy over the social role of women.

== The work ==
The pamphlet argues that any person or creature which is half one thing and half another is unnatural and wrong; thus a woman who dresses as a man is as "revolting as a mermaid." The author worries that dressing like a man leads a woman speaking out like men and essentially becoming male in outward form.

The narration of Hic Mulier is from a single viewpoint and its style is based on oral delivery. This style differs from its companion pamphlet Haec Vir, which is written as a dialogue between the two characters Hic Mulier and Haec Vir. There is evidence suggesting that masculine women were both a social and literary phenomenon. The topic of masculine women was briefly popular, but lost appeal after King James died in 1625.

Hic Mulier quotes twelve lines from Thomas Overbury's notorious poem A Wife. The currency of this reference is reflected in Overbury's being identified solely by his initials.

== See also ==
- Trans man
- Drag king
- List of transgender-related topics
