= Pieter Mulier II =

Dutch painter

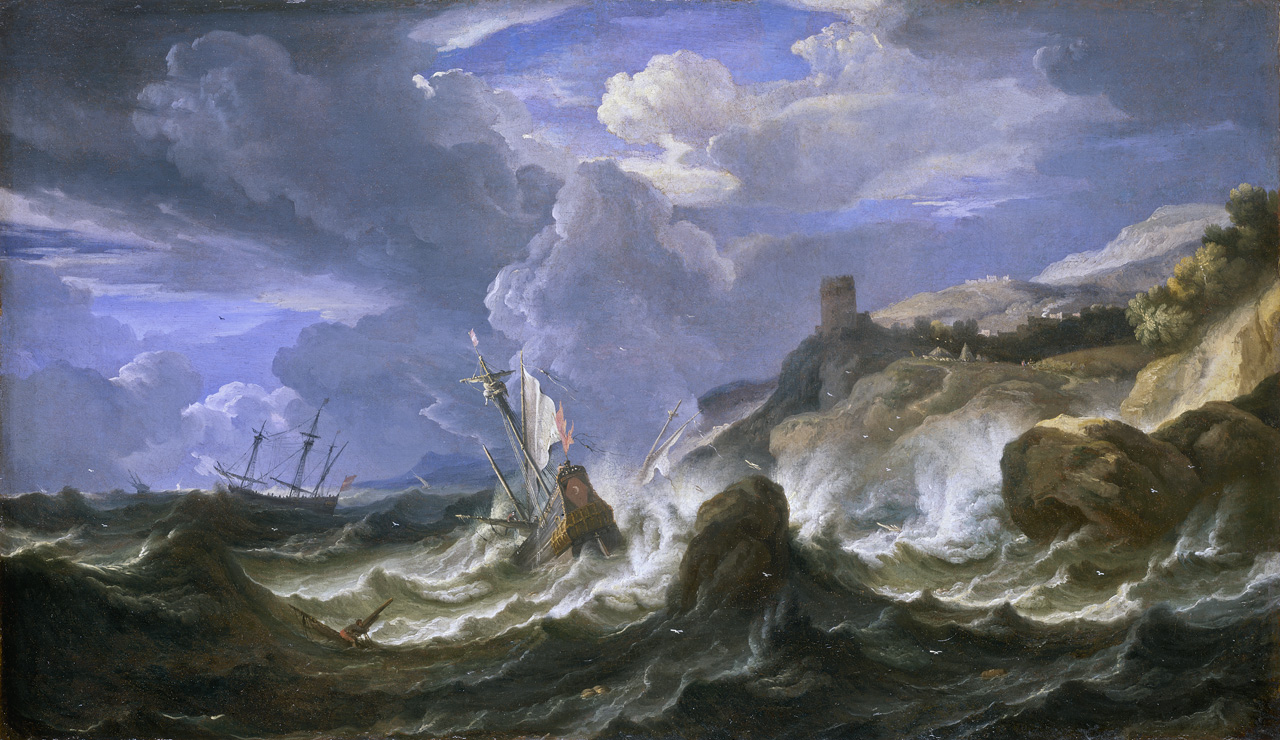
A Ship Wrecked in a Storm off a Rocky Coast

Cavalier Pietro Tempesta, or Pieter Mulier II (1637 – 29 June 1701) was a Dutch Golden Age painter active in the Papal States.

== Biography ==
Muller was born in Haarlem. He learned to paint from his father, Pieter Mulier I and travelled to Italy, working in Rome (1656–1670), Genoa (1670–1684) and northern Italy until he died in Milan. Among his pupils were Carlo Antonio Tavella and Pietro Cignaroli (active 1716 in Milan). He is known for Italianate landscapes in the manner of Thomas Wijck.

== Italy ==
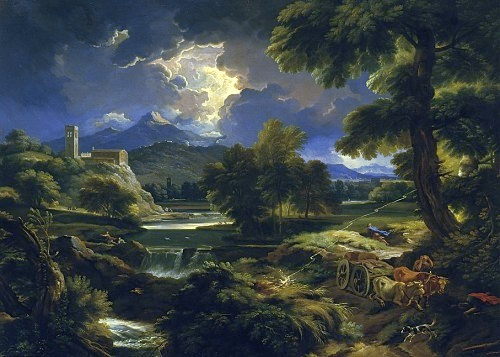
Italian landscape with a storm, National Museum, Warsaw

According to Arnold Houbraken, Tempeest was the son of Pieter de Molijn, not Pieter Mulier. He could paint quite well, but he emigrated to Rome at a young age and became a member of the Bentvueghels with the nickname Tempeest. He was thought to be a man of 50 by Isaac de Moucheron when he was in Rome (Bent name Ordenantie) in 1697. He specialized in wilde zwynenjagten, or hunting scenes, in the manner of Frans Snyders. In Genoa he was imprisoned for 16 years for killing his wife. He was visited in prison by Jan Visser, a painter from the Bentvueghels known as Slempop. When the French bombarded the city in 1684, he was set free and fled to Parma, where he lived to old age, painting with two eyeglasses, one in front of the other.

== In Literature ==
Mulier is the subject of a poem by Felicia Hemans published in The Edinburgh Magazine, 1829, The Storm-Painter in his Dungeon.
