= Thomas Adams (priest) =

English clergyman and reputed preacher

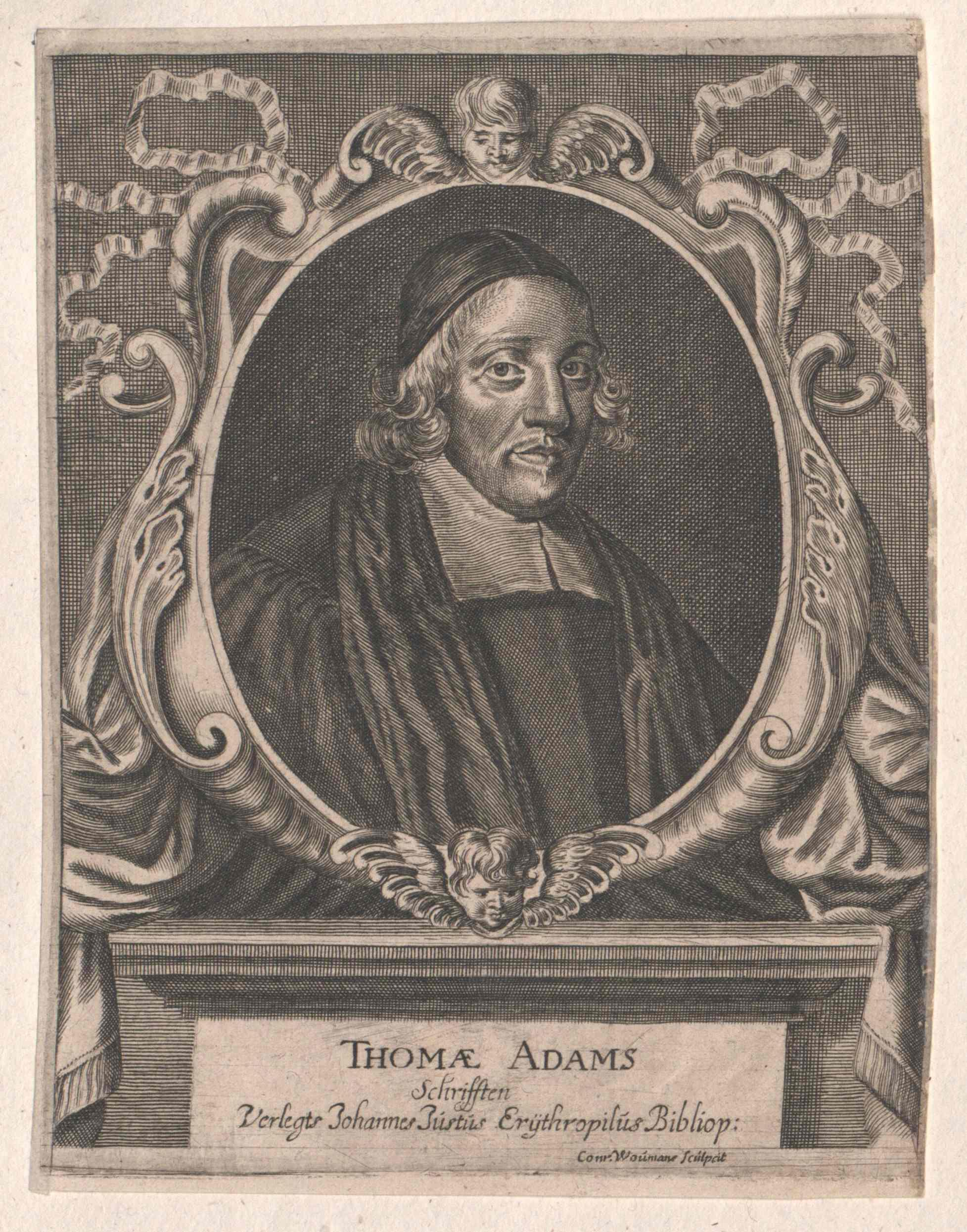
Thomas Adams

Thomas Adams (1583–1652) was an English Anglican clergyman and reputed preacher. He was called "the prose Shakespeare of Puritan theologians" by Robert Southey; while he was a Calvinist in theology, he is not, however, accurately described as a Puritan. He was for a time at Willington, Bedfordshire, and his works may later have been read by John Bunyan.

== Life ==
Much of the information about Adams comes from title-pages and dedications in his works.

He was educated at the University of Cambridge, graduating B.A. in 1601 and M.A. in 1606. Ordained in 1604, he was a curate at Northill in Bedfordshire, a position he lost. By 1611, he was vicar of Willington.

On 21 December 1614 he became vicar of Wingrave, Buckinghamshire, a position he held until 1618. From 1618 to 1623 he held the preachership of St Gregory by St Paul's, and during the same period preached occasionally at St. Paul's Cross and Whitehall.

He was 'observant chaplain' to Henry Montagu, 1st Earl of Manchester, lord chief justice of England. Incidental references show that he was on intimate terms with William Herbert, 3rd Earl of Pembroke and Lord Ellesmere. Montagu was a dedicatee, as was Sir Henry Marten.

He was buried on 26 November 1652.

== Works ==
Early sermons were Heaven and Earth Reconciled, and The Devil's Banquet. To Montagu he dedicated a work in 1618. In 1629 he collected into a massive folio his occasional sermons, a collection he dedicated to the parishioners of St Benet Paul's Wharf, and to the Lords Pembroke and Manchester. In 1633 appeared a long Commentary on the Second Epistle of St. Peter, dedicated to "Sir Henrie Marten, Knt."
