= Gerard Donck =

Dutch Golden Age painter

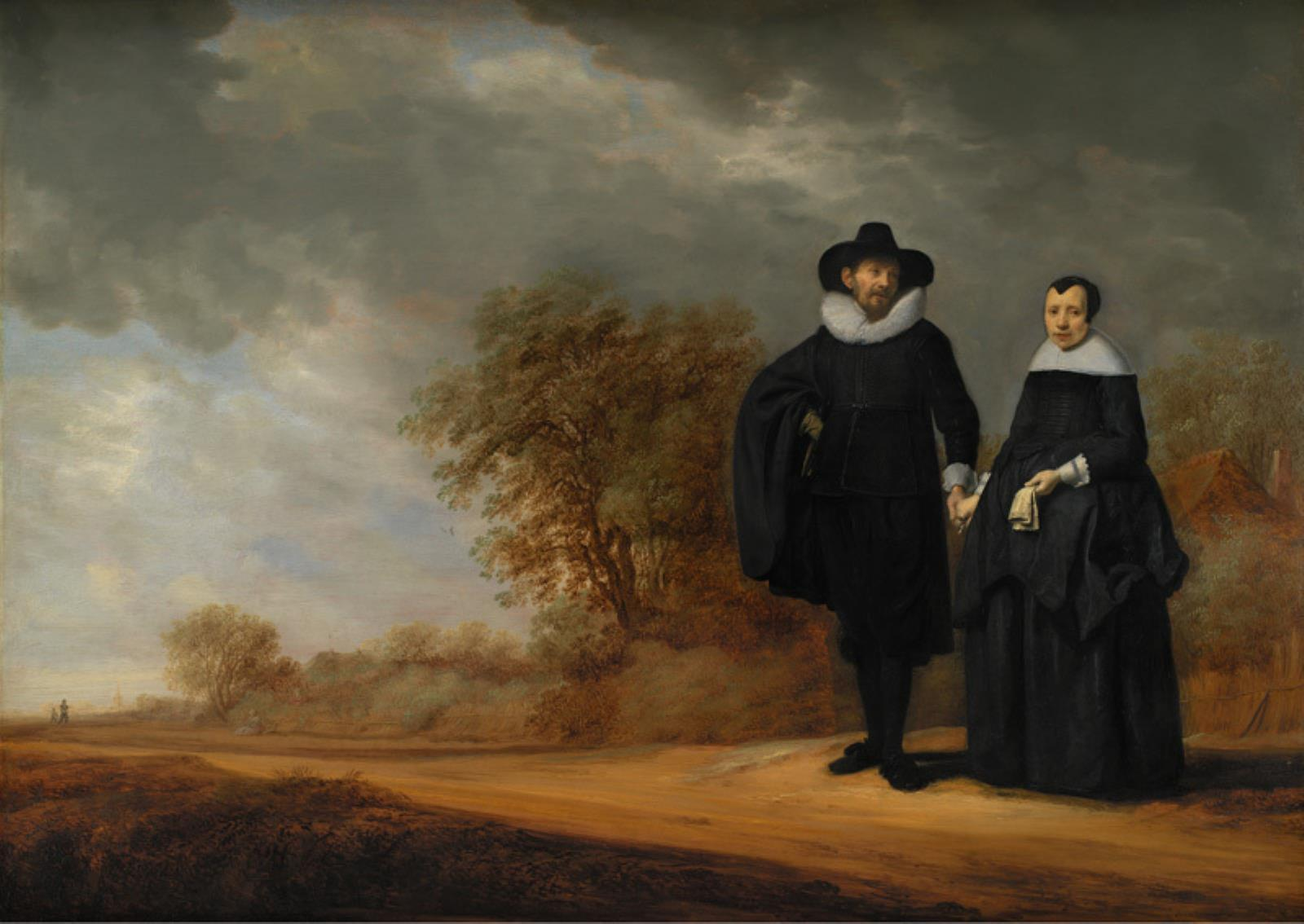
Burgomaster Cornelis Damasz. van der Gracht and his Wife, Jopken; portraits by Donck and landscape by Frans de Hulst.

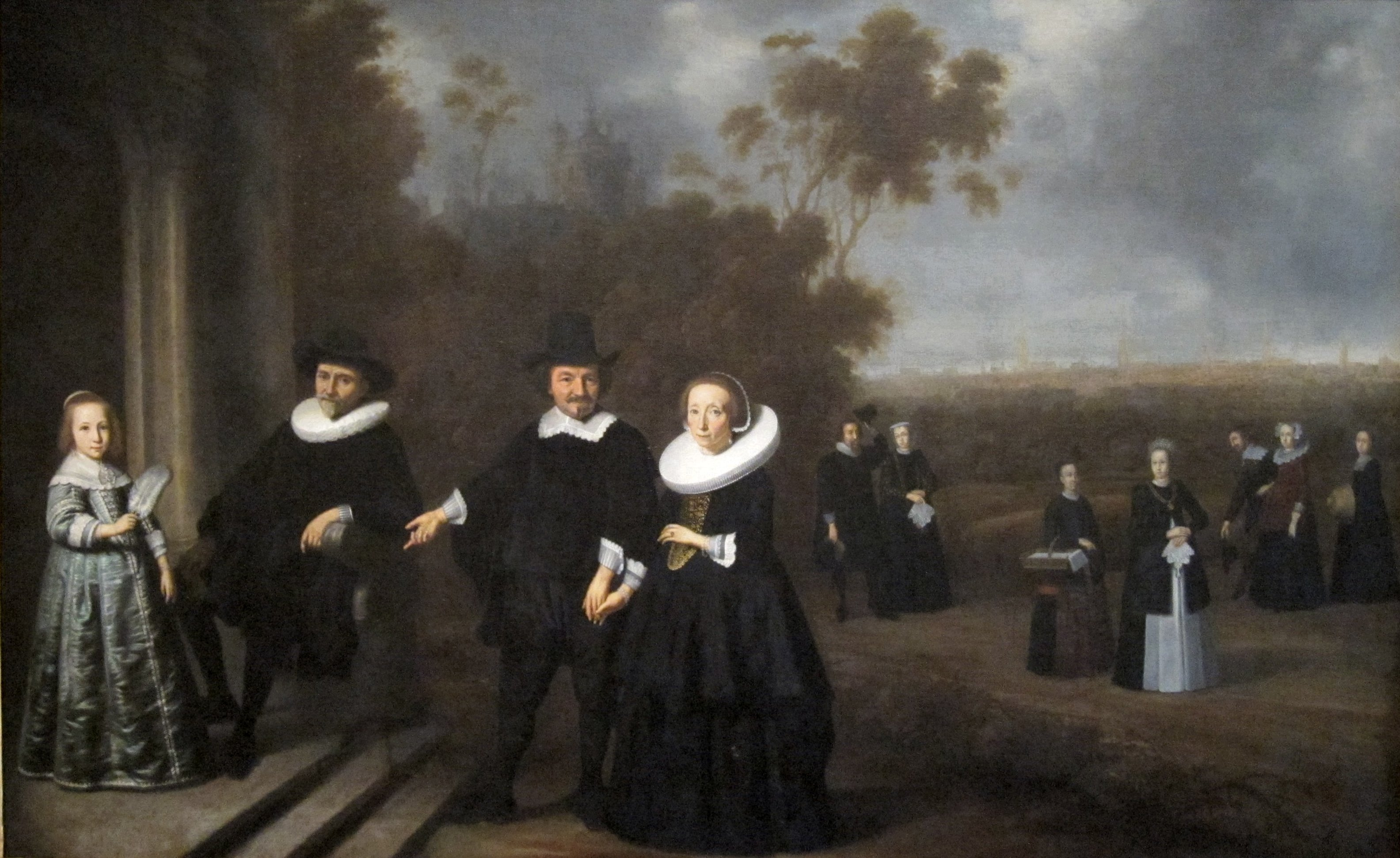
The Burgomaster's Family, possibly painted by Gerard Donck c. 1640

Gerard Donck (1600 – 1650) was a Dutch Golden Age painter.

== Biography ==
Donck was born and died in Amsterdam. According to the RKD he produced dated portraits in the years 1627-1640.

== Collections ==
Utah Museum of Fine Arts
