= Pieter Mulier the Elder =

Dutch Golden Age painter

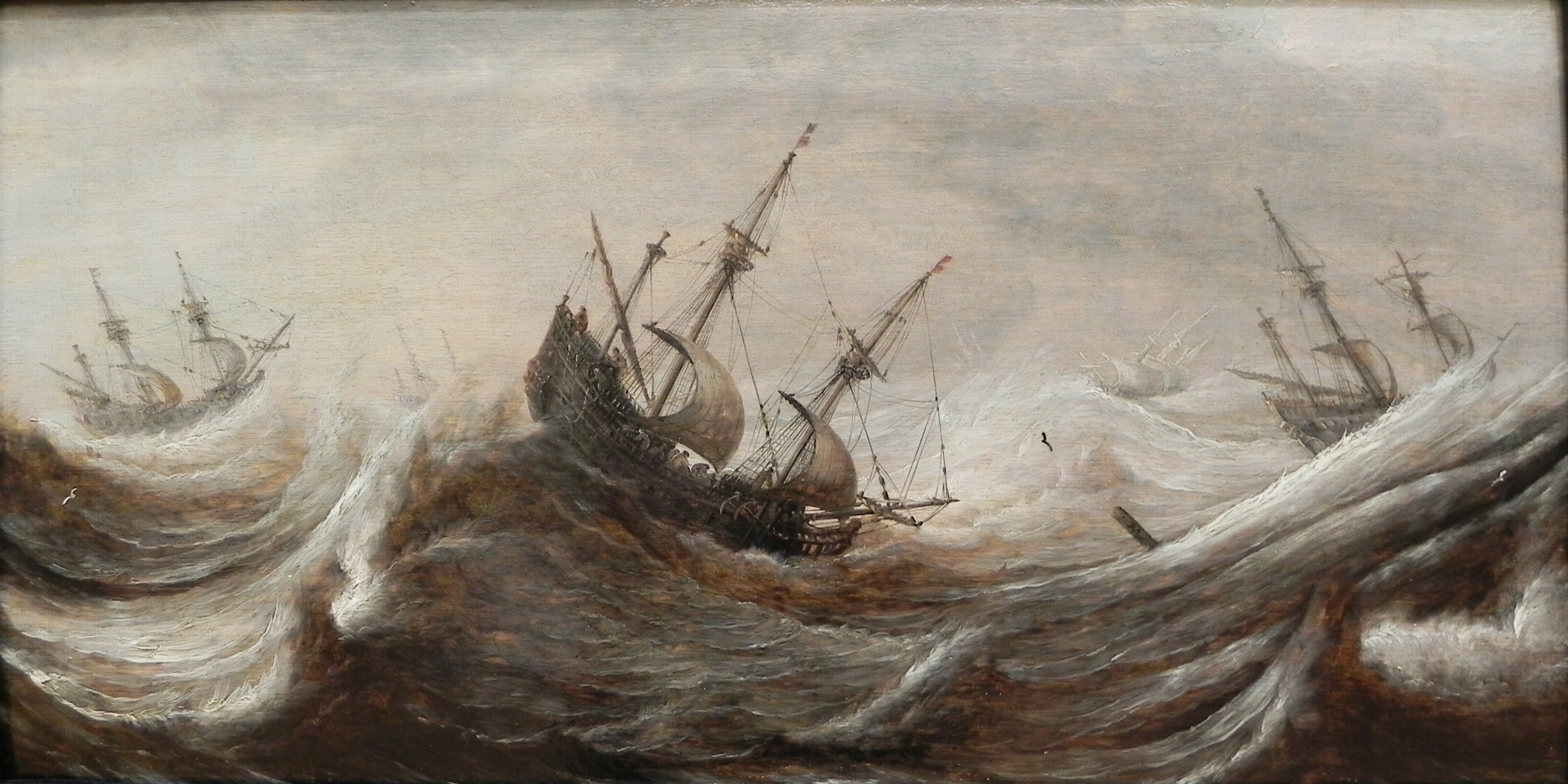
Sailing ships in a Breeze

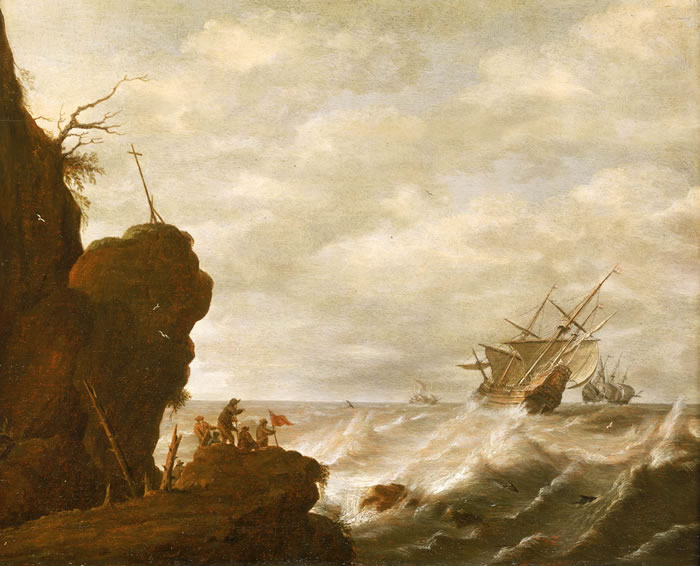
A Dutch Ship in a Breeze off a Rocky Coast

Pieter Mulier I (ca.1610, Haarlem – 1659, Haarlem), was a Dutch Golden Age painter.

== Biography ==
According to the RKD, he married in 1635 and became a member of the Haarlem Guild of St. Luke in 1638. He was known for Italianate landscapes and seascapes in the manner of Simon de Vlieger and Jan van Goyen. He was the teacher of his son Pieter Mulier II and Frans de Hulst.
