= ACDC Lane =

Road in Melbourne, Victoria

AC/DC Lane Corporation Lane Victoria
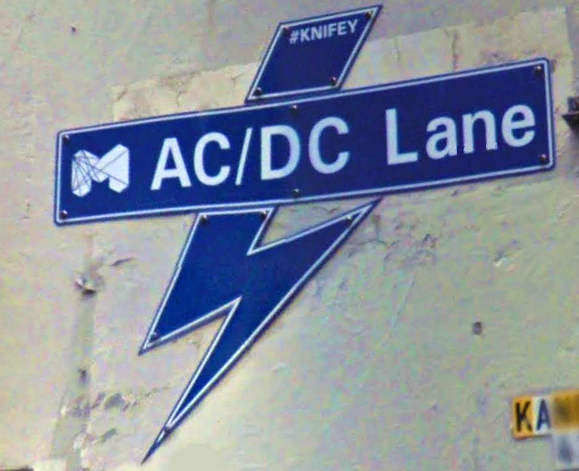
- The street sign for AC/DC Lane in Melbourne
- Coordinates: 37°48′56″S 144°58′15″E

General information
- Type: Street
- Opened: 2004

Major junctions
- North end: Flinders Lane
- South end: Duckboard Place

AC/DC Lane is a laneway in the central business district of Melbourne, Victoria, Australia. A short and narrow street running south off Flinders Lane, it runs roughly north–south in between Exhibition Street and Russell Street. The lane is named as a tribute to the famous Australian hard rock band AC/DC.

== History ==
The street was formerly an unnamed Corporation Lane. As a tribute to Australian rock band AC/DC the lane was officially renamed on 1 October 2004. The renaming was permitted by a unanimous vote of the City of Melbourne.

Melbourne's Lord Mayor John So launched AC/DC Lane with the words, "As the song says, there is a highway to hell, but this is a laneway to heaven. Let us rock." Bagpipers then played "It's a Long Way to the Top (If You Wanna Rock 'n' Roll)."

The trademark lightning bolt or slash ("/") used to separate the 'AC' and 'DC' in the band's name contravened the naming policy of the Office of the Registrar of Geographic Names, so the punctuation was omitted on the street sign. One month after the renaming, a lightning bolt was erected above and below the street sign by an artist named Knifey (Jayszun Vanderwerff).

In 2010 when AC/DC toured Melbourne on their Black Ice tour, artist Ben Couzens transformed the lane with a chronological street poster mural tribute to the band.

AC/DC Lane was the former location of the Cherry Bar, a rock music bar and nightclub.

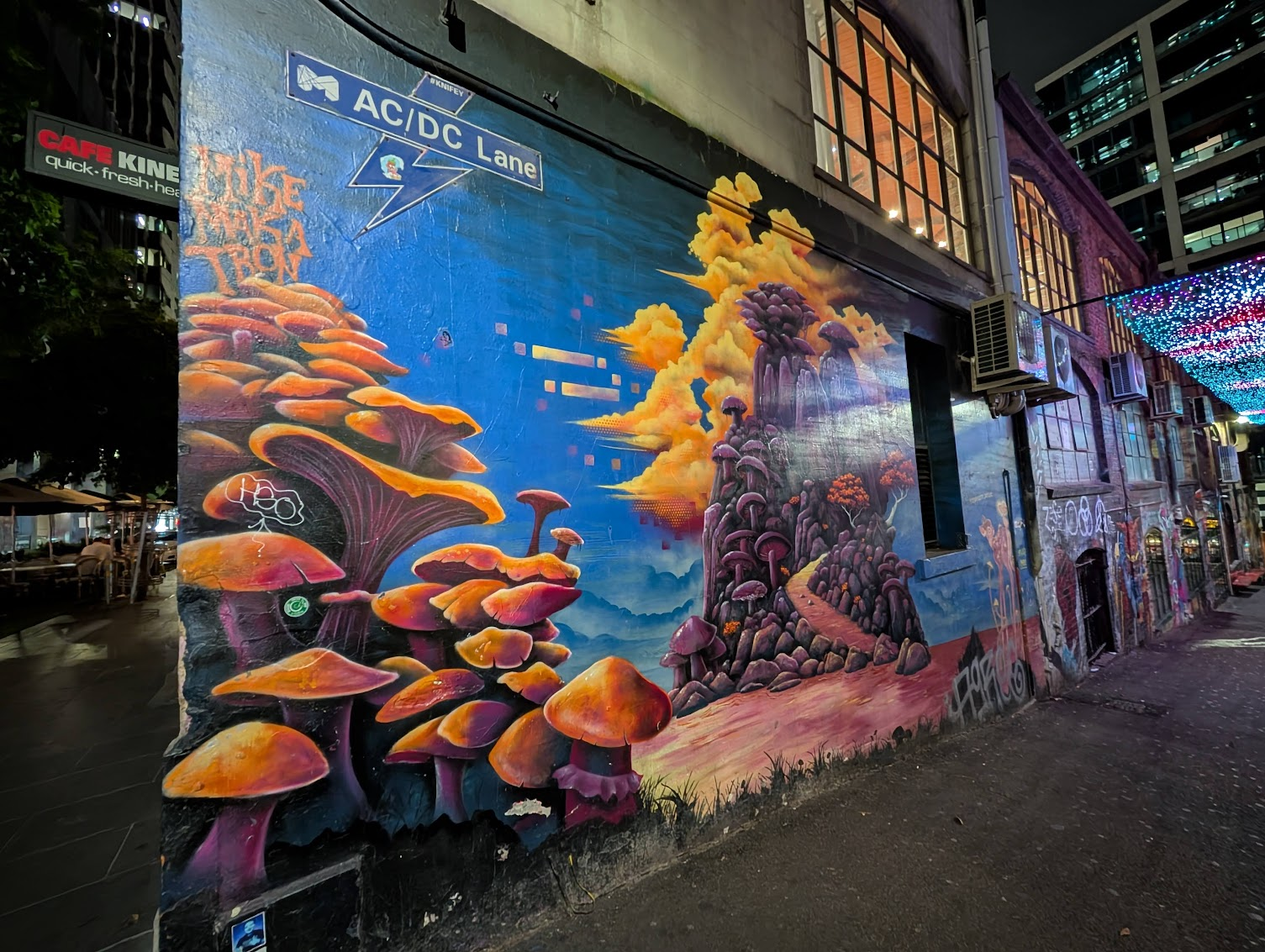
AC/DC Lane, Melbourne.

== Toponymy ==
Corporation Lane (the generic name assigned to otherwise unnamed lanes in Melbourne) was renamed in part because of band AC/DC's ties to Melbourne, their status as cultural ambassadors for Australia, and the lane's position in the city's bar and rock district. AC/DC famously filmed their music video for It's a Long Way to the Top along Swanston Street which runs parallel to AC/DC Lane.

== See also ==
- Leganés, Spain, also has a street called Calle AC/DC. The sign is allegedly painted on as fans of the band often steal the sign.
