= Cherry Bar =

Bar and music venue in Melbourne, Australia

Coordinates: 37.8156°S 144.9710°E

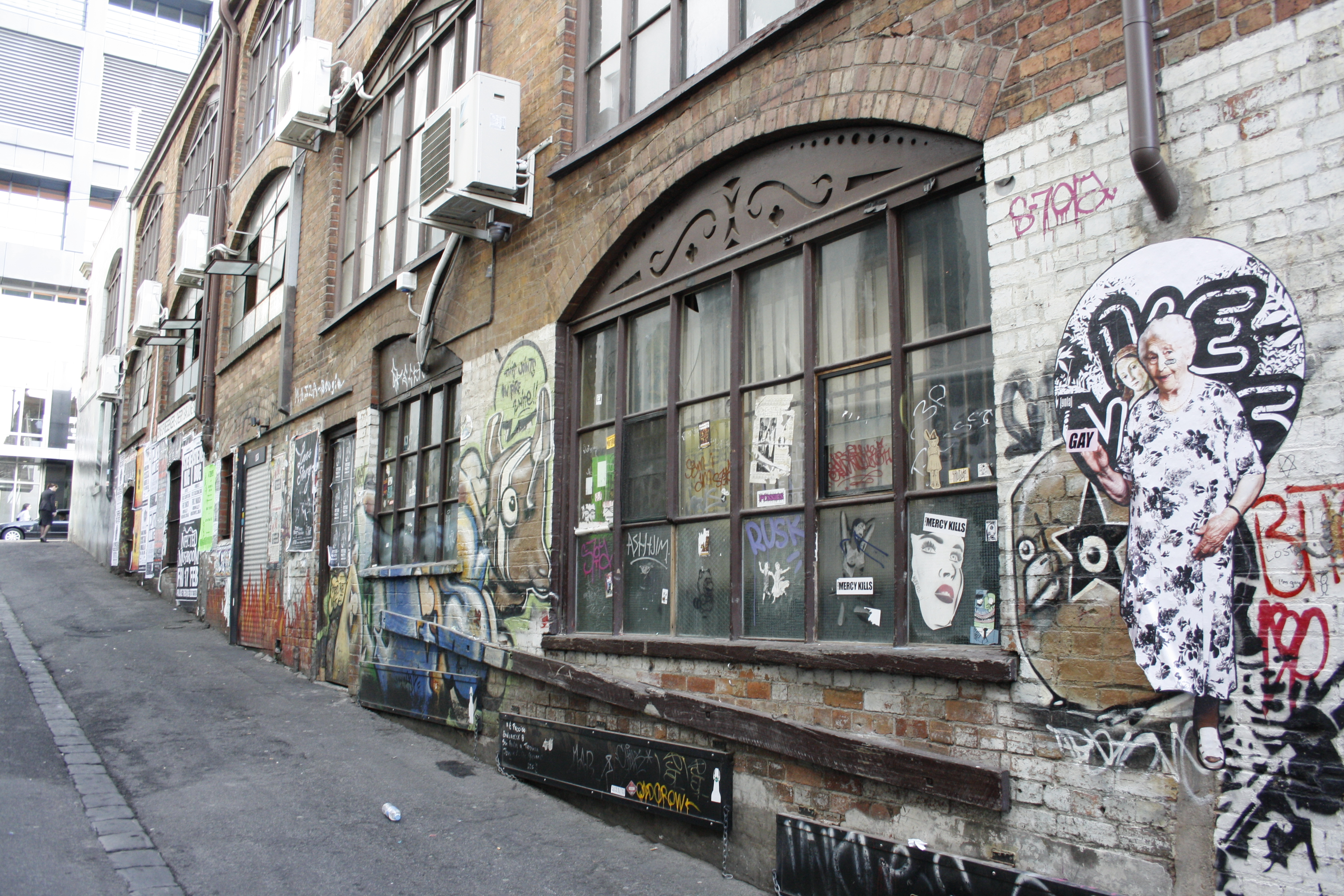
ACDC Lane contains the entrance to the original location of Cherry Bar

The Cherry Bar is a Melbourne city bar founded in December 1999 by former Cosmic Psychos drummer Bill Walsh and Jim Bourke.Originally located on ACDC Lane (off Flinders Lane between Russell St and Exhibition St), the bar replaced existing artists studios in the building to make a rock music venue that has become a popular concert after-party venue for touring bands and their crews.

Oasis guitarist Noel Gallagher was so taken with the bar during the band's 2002 Australian tour, he made an offer to purchase it. Other high-profile international visitors included Mick Jagger, Johnny Marr (from The Smiths) and Lady Gaga.

In the early 2000s punters were brought to Cherry through its Deep Funk nights on Wednesdays with John Idem, hiphop Thursdays, and the consistent rock n' roll weekend nights. Thursday nights was Soul night, while rock from all genres and eras was played on weekends by founder Bill Walsh, Max Crawdaddy, Rock DJ Paul Miles, and Little Scotty. Later, the DJ roster included rock DJs Mary M, Dom, Kez, DJ Mermaid and Leaping Larry L, with radio PBS announcers Vince Peach and Pierre Baroni helming Thursday night's Soul In The Basement.

Local promoter and former lawyer, radio and television presenter James Young has been managing Cherry with a consortium since 2006. In 2021 the registration for `Cherry Bar ACDC Lane Pty Ltd` was liquidated, and a new company with a new corporate structure was created giving Mr. Young majority ownership.

Although inaccurately reported by Melbourne's Herald Sun that the building was destroyed by fire on 5 June 2008, it was in fact the offices located in the floors above which burned, whereas the Cherry bar, being located in the basement of the building, suffered only water damage. The bar was expected to reopen following two weeks cleaning and restoration of the electricals damaged by the water used in the fire-fighting effort but building complications delayed the re-opening until New Year's Eve.

As regulars of Cherry, rock band Airbourne reference the bar in the lyrics of their song Fat City: "Midnight bite at the Cherry, so sweet is the juice." Melbourne-band Jet also drew upon their many long nights spent at the bar as an influence for their song Rollover DJ, after an inebriated band member was rebuked for spilling his drink over the in-house DJ's records. In 2018 indie rockers Glomesh released the track Crawlin' Up AC/DC Lane. The music video for Kylie Auldist's track Sensational was filmed at Cherry, as were scenes from the big-budget 2002 vampire flick Queen Of The Damned, featuring locals among the extras.

In May 2017, Cherry Bar become embroiled in the manslaughter of Jaiden Walker after an altercation with drug affected Richard Vincec at the location. Vincec was not charged under the "coward punch" laws taking into account Walker's blood-alcohol reading of 0.19 at the time.

In 2019 Cherry's management announced that they would be relocating to the former location of late-night venue Pony (AKA Boney), 68 Little Collins St, Melbourne. One of the last performances at the AC/DC Lane location was by Melbourne hard rock band Shotgun Mistress, featuring Abramelin and former Akercocke guitarist Matt Wilcock.
