= Mary Frith =

English pickpocket and fence (c. 1584 – 1659)

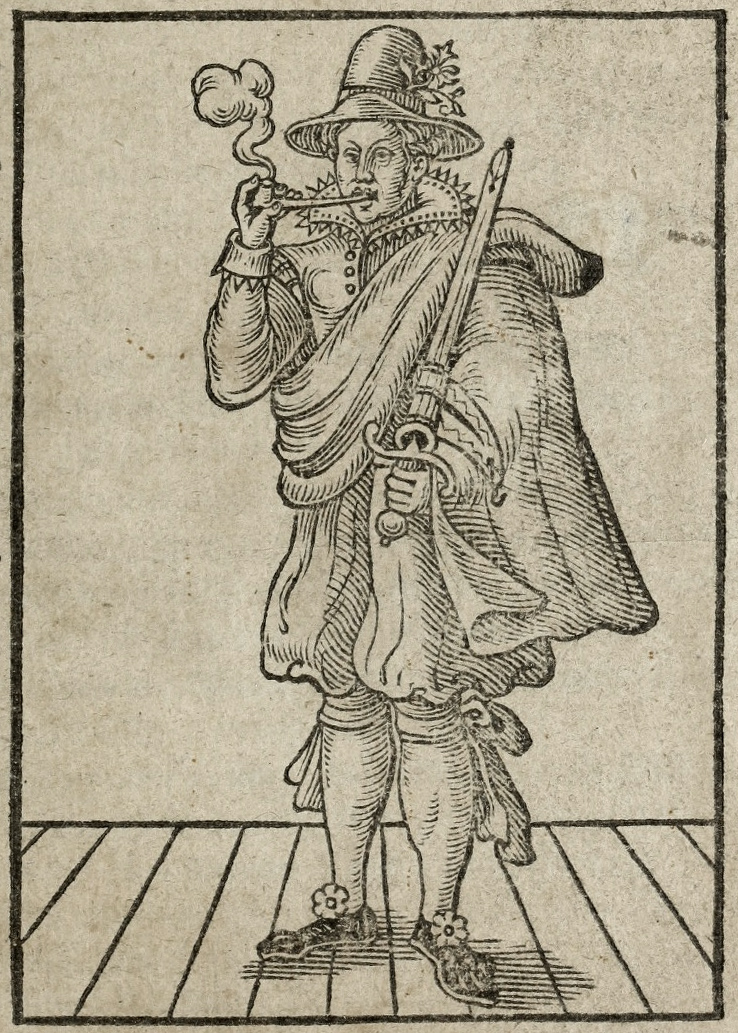
- Image of Mary Frith from title page of The Roaring Girl
- Born: 1584 or 1585; The Barbican, London, Kingdom of England
- Died: 26 July 1659; Fleet Street, London, England
- Other names: Moll Cutpurse, Mal Cutpurse, Tom Faconer
- Occupations: Pickpocket and fence
- Spouse: Lewknor Markham
- Parent(s): Ron and Catherine Stuart

Mary Frith (c. 1584 – 26 July 1659), alias Moll (or Mal) Cutpurse, was a notorious English pickpocket and fence of the London underworld.

== Meaning of nicknames ==
Moll, apart from being a nickname for Mary, was a common name in the 16th through 17th centuries for a young woman, usually of disreputable character. The term "Cutpurse" refers to her reputation as a thief who would cut purses to steal the contents.

The other name by which she was known, "The Roaring Girl" is derived from the early modern London trend of "roaring boys," or aggressive young men of lower social stations who defied codes of civility and aped the belligerent and courtly styles of the upper class.

== Biography ==
The facts of her life are extremely confusing, with many exaggerations and myths attached to her name. The Life of Mrs Mary Frith, a sensationalised biography written in 1662, three years after her death, helped to perpetuate many of these myths.

Mary Frith was born in the mid-1580s to a shoemaker and a housewife. Mary's uncle, who was a minister and her father's brother, once attempted to reform her at a young age by sending her to New England. However, she jumped overboard before the ship set sail, and refused to go near her uncle again. Mary presented herself in public in a doublet and baggy breeches, smoking a pipe and swearing if she wished. She was recorded as having been burned on her hand four times, a common punishment for thieves. In February 1612 she was sentenced to do penance standing in a white sheet at St. Paul's Cross during the Sunday morning sermon. It had little effect, since she still wore men's clothing, and she set mirrors up all around her house to stroke her vanity. Her house was surprisingly rather feminine, due to the efforts of her three full-time maids. She kept parrots and bred mastiffs. Her dogs were particularly special to her: each had its own bed with sheets and blankets. She prepared their food herself.

It is believed that she first came to prominence in 1600 when she was indicted in Middlesex for stealing 2s 11d on 26 August of that year. It is at that point she began to gain notoriety. In the following years, two plays were written about her. First the 1610 drama The Madde Pranckes of Mery Mall of the Bankside by John Day, the text of which is now lost. Another play (that has survived) came a year later by Thomas Middleton and Thomas Dekker, The Roaring Girl. Both works dwelt on her scandalous behaviour, especially that of dressing in men's attire, and did not show her in an especially favourable light, though the surviving play is fairly complimentary of her by contemporary standards. The Roaring Girl, while highlighting her qualities that were deemed improper, also depicted her as possessing virtue, such as when she attacks a male character for assuming all women to be prostitutes, and when she exhibits chastity by refusing to ever marry. Hear Me Roar, a play written by James Bell, inspired by The Roaring Girl and based on the life of the Mary Frith, premiered at Grand Valley State University in Michigan, United States on 28 March 2025.

However, Mary seems to have been given a fair amount of freedom in a society that so frowned upon women who acted unconventionally. In 1611 Frith even performed (in men's clothing, as always) at the Fortune Theatre. On stage she bantered with the audience and sang songs while playing the lute. It can be assumed that the banter and song were somewhat obscene, but by merely performing in public at all she was defying convention. (Note: "[W]omen were banned from the public stage in England until the second half of the century.")

Once a showman named William Banks bet Mary 20 pounds that she would not ride from Charing Cross to Shoreditch dressed as a man. Not only did she win the bet, she rode flaunting a banner and blowing a trumpet as well. She also rode Marocco, a famous performing horse.

Such public actions led to some reprisal. Frith was arrested for being dressed indecently on 25 December 1611 and accused of being involved in prostitution. On 9 February 1612 Mary was required to do a penance for her "evil living" at St Paul's Cross. She put on a performance then, according to a letter by John Chamberlain to Dudley Carleton. In his letter, Chamberlain observes, "She wept bitterly and seemed very penitent, but it is since doubted she was maudlin drunk, being discovered to have tippled off three quarts of sack".

She married Lewknor Markham (possibly the son of playwright Gervase Markham) on 23 March 1614. It has been alleged that the marriage was little more than a clever charade. Evidence shows that the whole thing was contracted to give Frith a counter when suits against her referred to her as a "spinster".

It turned out that society had some reason for its disapproval; by the 1620s she was, according to her own account, working as a fence and a pimp. She not only procured young women for men, but also respectable male lovers for middle-class wives. In one case where a wife confessed on her deathbed infidelity with lovers that Mary provided, Mary supposedly convinced the woman's lovers to send money for the maintenance of the children that were probably theirs. At the time, women who dressed in men's attire on a regular basis were generally considered to be "sexually riotous and uncontrolled", but Mary herself claimed to be uninterested in sex.

She is recorded as being released on 21 June 1644 from Bethlem Hospital after being cured of insanity, which may or not be related to the (possibly apocryphal) story that she robbed General Fairfax and shot him in the arm during the Civil War. It was said that to escape the gallows and Newgate Prison she paid a £2,000 bribe.

She died of dropsy on 26 July 1659 on Fleet Street in London.

== Image and gender ==
The manner in which Frith dressed and spoke challenged the moral codes of her day. She has been regarded as the "first female smoker of England" and most images of her show her smoking a pipe, which was seen as an exclusively male practice during her time period. As portrayed by the theatre of that era, tobacco smoking was not enjoyable to women. Smoking and cross-dressing were crucial to her image and character.

Frith enjoyed the attention she drew, as her theatrical ways were intended to cause a scene and make others uncomfortable. In one of her performances, Amends for Ladies, which was featured at the Fortune Theatre in London, Frith played in stark contrast to the other female leads. While the other women discussed their roles as wives or maids, Frith appeared as a negative representation of freedom. By cross-dressing and breaking social boundaries, she was shown as having no structure, and by gaining freedom she was shown as having lost the qualities that made her a woman. Amends for Ladies was meant to show her as a different creature entirely, not possessing the standards that a woman should hold or want to hold. These behaviours, which carried into her daily life, led to her punishment in February 1611, when she was forced to perform public penance.
