= List of Art Deco buildings in Melbourne =

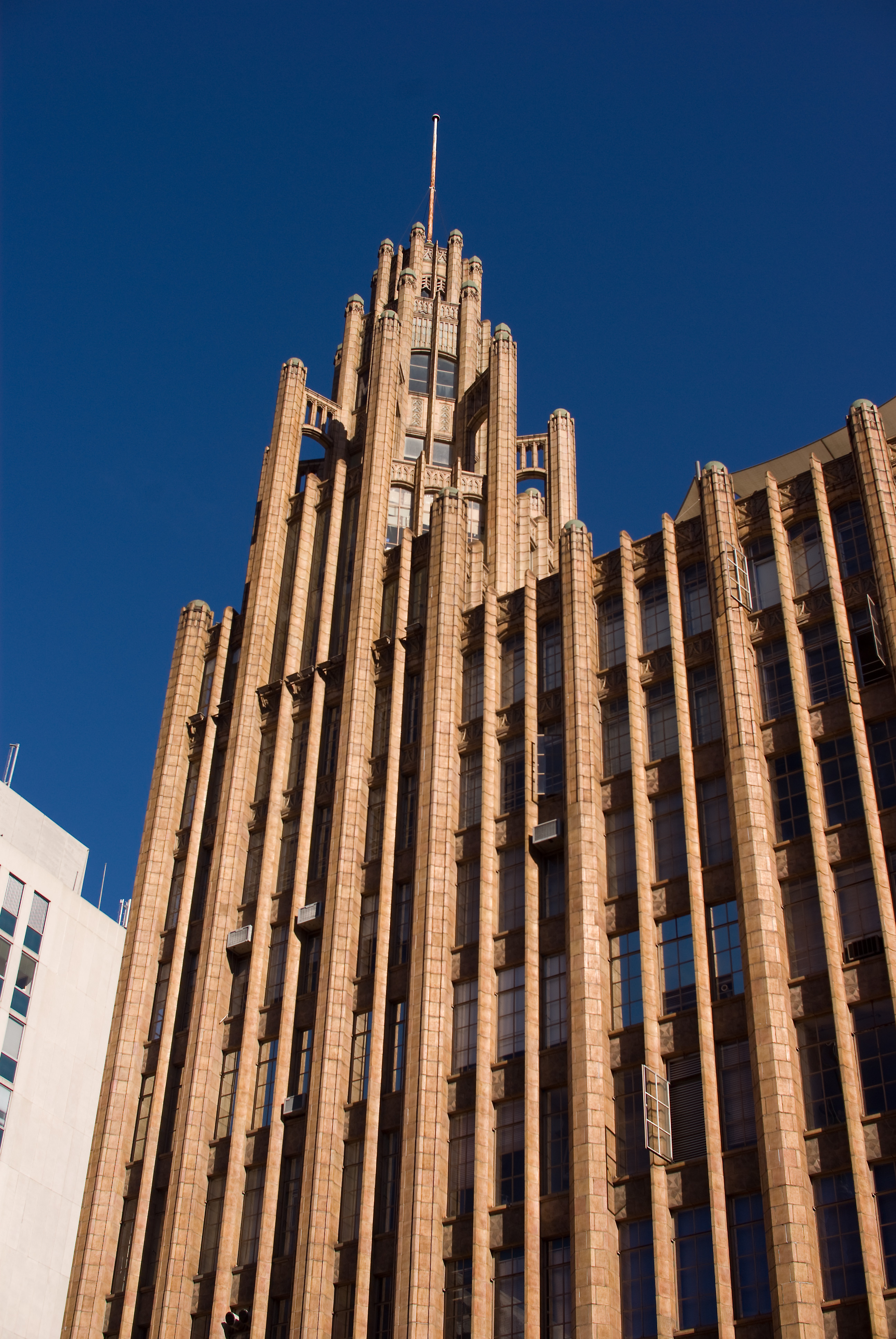
Manchester Unity Building

This page is a list of all historically significant Art Deco and Moderne buildings in the Melbourne metropolitan area.

== Office buildings ==
- Alkira House, 18 Queen Street, Melbourne
- Australasian Catholic Assurance Building, 118-126 Queen Street, Melbourne
- Australian Natives' Association Building, 28-32 Elizabeth Street, Melbourne
- Buckley & Nunn, 310 Bourke Street, Melbourne
- Carlow House, 289 Flinders Lane, Melbourne
- Century Building, 133 Swanston Street, Melbourne
- Coles Store No 12, 299-307 Bourke Street, Melbourne
- Commercial Union Chambers, 411 Collins Street, Melbourne
- Commonwealth Bank, 225 Bourke Street, Melbourne
- Majorca Building, 55 Swanston St, Melbourne
- Manchester Unity Building, 291 Swanston Street, Melbourne
- Newspaper House, 247 Collins Street, Melbourne
- McPherson's Building, 546 Collins Street, Melbourne
- Mitchell House, 352-362 Lonsdale Street, Melbourne
- Myer Emporium, 314-336 Bourke Street, Melbourne
- Trustees Executors & Agency Company Building, 401 Collins Street, Melbourne
- Yule House, 309-311 Little Collins Street

== Apartment and residential buildings ==
- Burnham Beeches, Sherbrooke Road, Sassafras
- Glamis Towers, Loch Street, St Kilda
- The Rand, Marine Parade, St Kilda
- Holroyd court, St Kilda East
- Harry Winbush's house at corner of Fletcher and Nicholson Streets, Essendon
- Lissadurn, Toorak Road, South Yarra
- Coppin Court, Coppin Grove, Hawthorn

== Cinemas and theatres ==
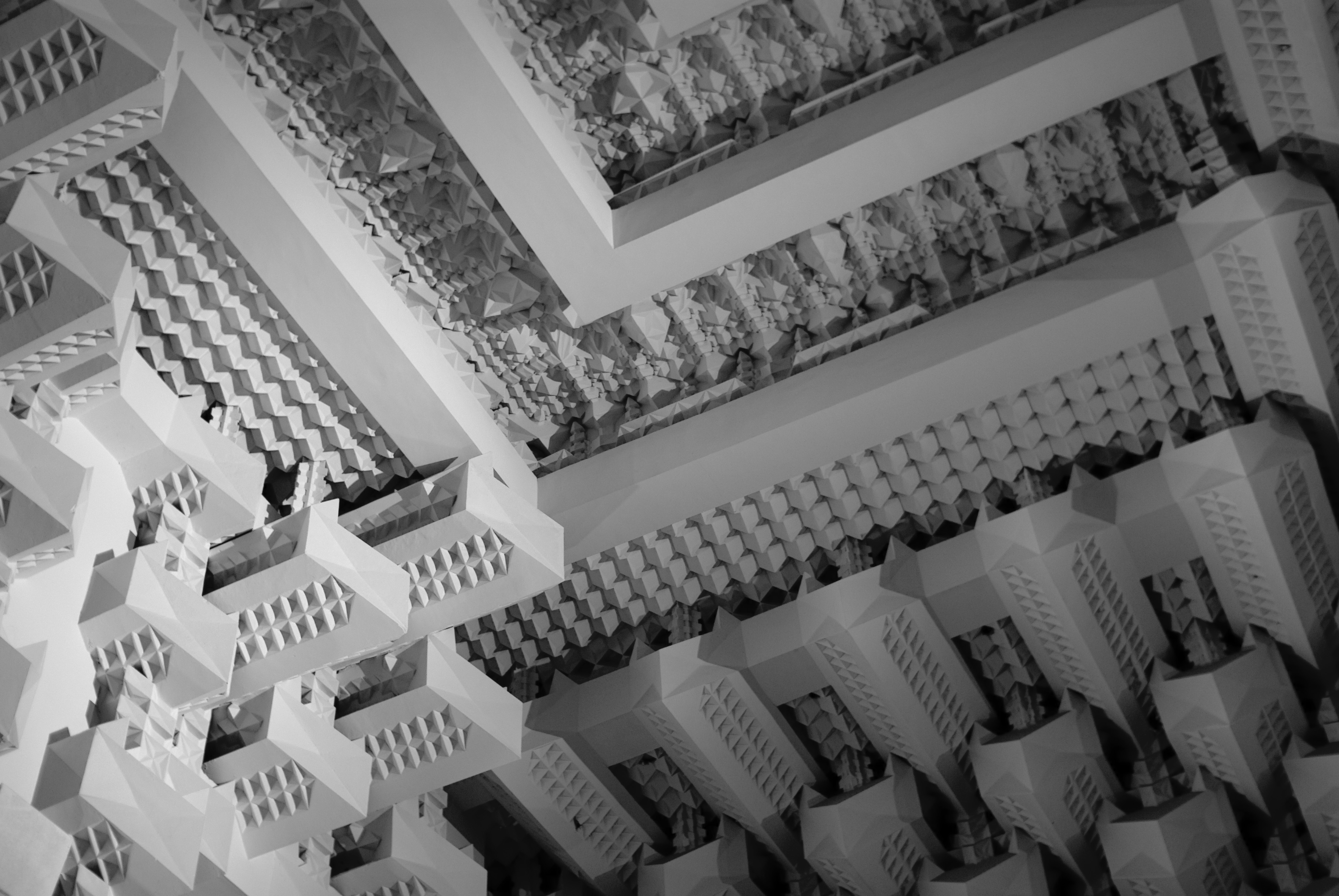
Capitol Theatre, ceiling detail

- Capitol Theatre, Swanston Street, Melbourne
- Her Majesty's Theatre (Interior Only), 199-227 Exhibition Street, Melbourne
- Rivoli Cinemas, 200 Camberwell Road, Melbourne (also known as Rivoli Theatre)
- Sun Theatre, Yarraville
- Astor Theatre, St Kilda
- Palais Theatre, St Kilda

== Public buildings and facilities ==
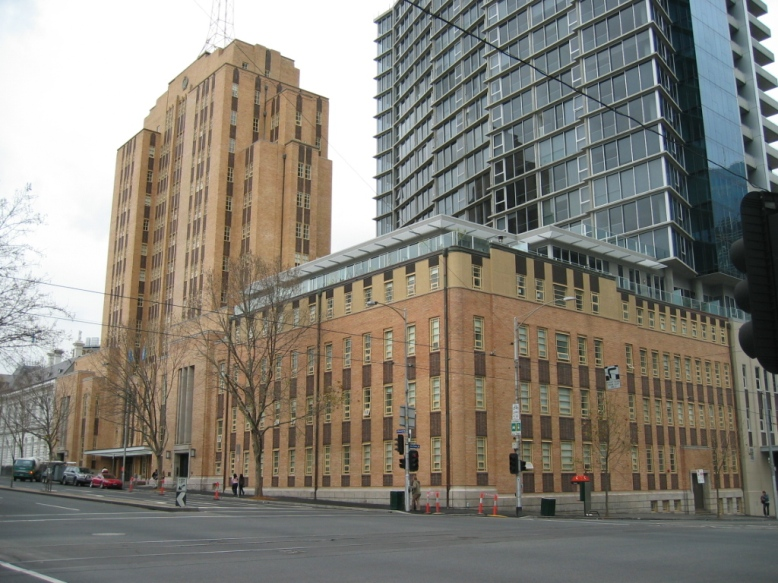
Russell Street Police Headquarters

- Michael Tuck Stand, Glenferrie Oval
- Shrine of Remembrance, St Kilda Road, Melbourne - although designed in a neo-classical style, the building possesses a number of distinctive Art Deco features.
- Heidelberg Town Hall
- Richmond Town Hall
- Former Russell Street Police Headquarters, 336-376 Russell Street, Melbourne

== Institutional buildings and facilities ==
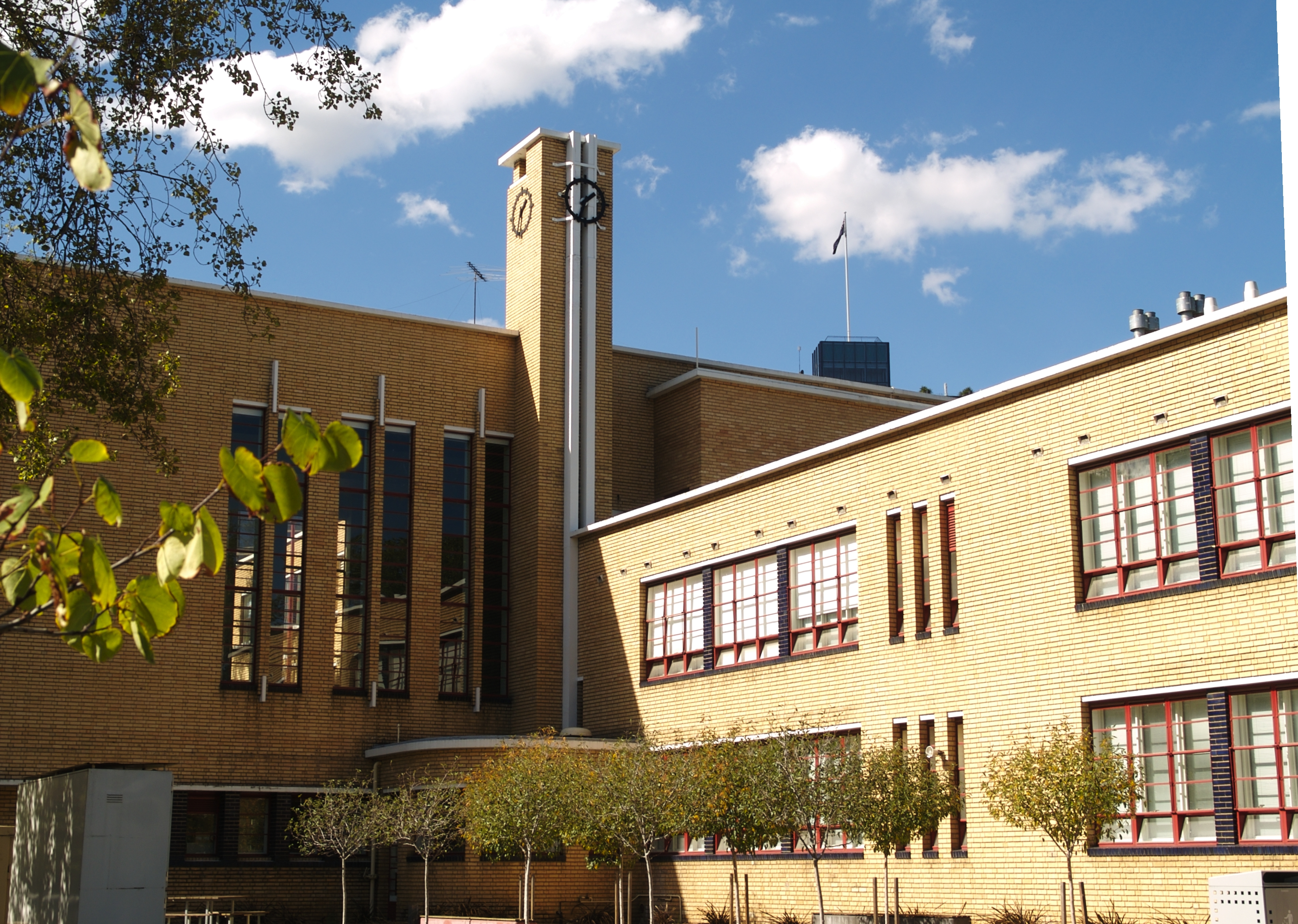
Mac.Robertson Girls' High School

- Centenary Hall, 104-110 Exhibition Street, Melbourne
- Freemasons' Hospital, 166 Clarendon Street, East Melbourne
- Mac.Robertson Girls' High School, 350 Kings Way, Albert Park
- Mercy Hospital, 159 Grey Street, East Melbourne
- Newman College, University of Melbourne, Parkville
- Repatriation Commission Outpatient Clinic, 310 St Kilda Rd, Southbank

== Hotels and pubs ==
- Clifton Hill McDonald's (formally the United Kingdom Hotel), Clifton Hill
- Greyhound Hotel, St Kilda
- Prince of Wales Hotel, St Kilda

== See also ==
- List of Art Deco architecture
- List of Art Deco architecture in Oceania
