= Platform (Australian art group) =

Australian visual arts group

Platform Artists Group Inc. Campbell Arcade

Platform Artists Group Inc. or Platform Contemporary Art Spaces, commonly known as Platform, is one of Australia's longest operating artist-run initiative. The organisation develops exhibitions of visual arts by artists from Australia and around the world. Platform primarily consists of 3 separate spaces, all located in and under the busy Flinders Lane precinct in the heart of Melbourne city.

Most of the activities of Platform are located in the Campbell Arcade subway under Flinders Street in Melbourne. A pedestrian poll conducted in 2005 by Connex estimated that more than 35,000 people a week pass through the Platform exhibition sites, making it one of the most visible sites for public art in Melbourne.

Platform provides support for many young artists by enabling them to present solo exhibitions and the organisation often debuts artists to the general public. During its operation, Platform has presented new work from more than 2,500 artists. Many have established successful art careers and have become well-respected professional artists.

== History ==
Founded in 1990 by artists Andrew Seward and Richard Holt, Platform's first location was a collection of glass display cases in the old Spencer Street station pedestrian underpass. In 1995, the City of Melbourne offered the group another underground space, Campbell Arcade, a subway located under Flinders Street and connecting Flinders Street station to Degraves Street. Platform expanded the exhibition program into this second space, running group and solo exhibitions at both the city's major train stations.

In 2000, Platform Artists Group further expanded the organisation into a subway shop they named Sticky. Promoting and selling Artist books and Zines, Sticky has since become an independent organisation and one of Australia's largest sellers of zines, stocking work from the United States, UK, Germany, France, China, Japan and New Zealand.

In 2004, the Spencer Street site was destroyed as part of the redevelopment of the station. Platform continued to deliver a contemporary art program at Campbell Arcade, Flinders Street Station under the new title, Platform Contemporary Art Spaces.

In 2010, Platform marked its 20th anniversary by publishing the book, What Art, Which Public?.
