= Town Hall railway station, Melbourne =

Railway station in Melbourne CBD, Victoria, Australia

Town Hall
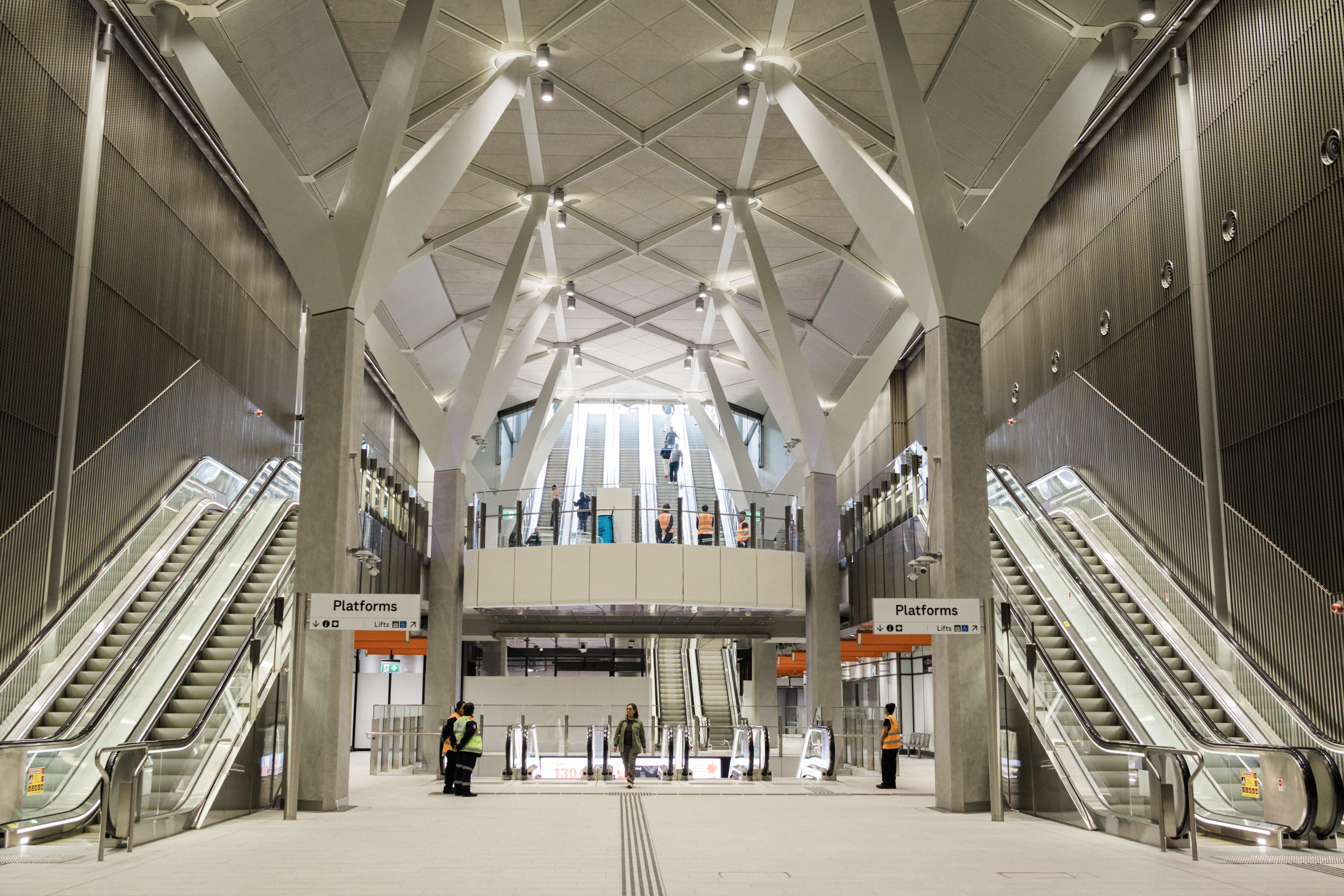
- Concourse of Town Hall station, December 2025

General information
- Location: Swanston Street; Melbourne, Victoria 3000; City of Melbourne; Australia
- Coordinates: 37.8159259°S 144.9671336°E
- System: PTV commuter rail station
- Owner: VicTrack
- Operator: Metro Trains
- Line: Cranbourne Pakenham Sunbury
- Distance: 10.28 kilometres from Southern Cross
- Platforms: 2
- Tracks: 2
- Connections: Flinders Street: Hurstbridge Mernda; Lilydale Belgrave Alamein (Note: Peak only); Glen Waverley; Craigieburn Upfield; Flemington Racecourse (Note: Special events only); Frankston; Werribee Williamstown; Sandringham; Gippsland; Tram

Construction
- Structure type: Underground
- Depth: 28 metres (92 feet)
- Accessible: Yes—step free access

Other information
- Status: Operational, premium station
- Station code: THL
- Fare zone: Myki zone 1
- Website: Public Transport Victoria

History
- Opened: 30 November 2025; 11 months ago
- Electrified: Yes (1500 V DC overhead)

Services
Preceding station	Metro Trains	Following station
through to Sunbury line	Cranbourne line	Anzac towards Cranbourne or East Pakenham
through to Sunbury line	Pakenham line	Anzac towards Cranbourne or East Pakenham
State Library towards Watergardens or Sunbury	Sunbury line	through to Cranbourne and Pakenham lines
Track layout
Location

Town Hall station is an underground railway station operated by Metro Trains Melbourne on the Cranbourne, Pakenham and Sunbury lines, part of the Melbourne rail network. It serves the Melbourne city centre in Melbourne, Victoria, Australia.

Opened as part of the Metro Tunnel project, Town Hall is an underground premium station, featuring an island platform with two platforms. The station connects directly to Flinders Street station via an underground concourse. Major construction commenced in April 2018 and was completed in October 2025. The station opened on 30 November 2025, along with the rest of the Metro Tunnel.

Named after the nearby Melbourne Town Hall, the station is located beneath Swanston Street between Flinders and Collins Streets and connects to tram services on these streets. It serves local destinations including St Paul's Cathedral, Federation Square, Southbank and the Degraves Street dining precinct.

== History ==
The Metro Tunnel project began in 2015, with early works commencing on the two central business district (CBD) station sites in 2017. In April 2017, City Square on Swanston Street was fenced off for the commencement of construction and staging works. Major station works at Town Hall began in 2018.

Cross Yarra Partnership, led by Lendlease, was named as the preferred bidder for the construction contract in July 2017 and designs for the project's five stations were presented by the consortium were released publicly, as well as details of connections to existing stations and streetscapes. In November 2017, after a naming competition, it was announced the CBD South station would be named Town Hall, after the nearby Melbourne Town Hall. Updated designs were revealed by the government in 2018 that showed Town Hall and State Library stations would feature large platform caverns with archways, and that there would be multiple entrances.

City Square, Port Philip Arcade on Flinders Street and several small shops along Swanston Street were demolished to allow construction of the station.

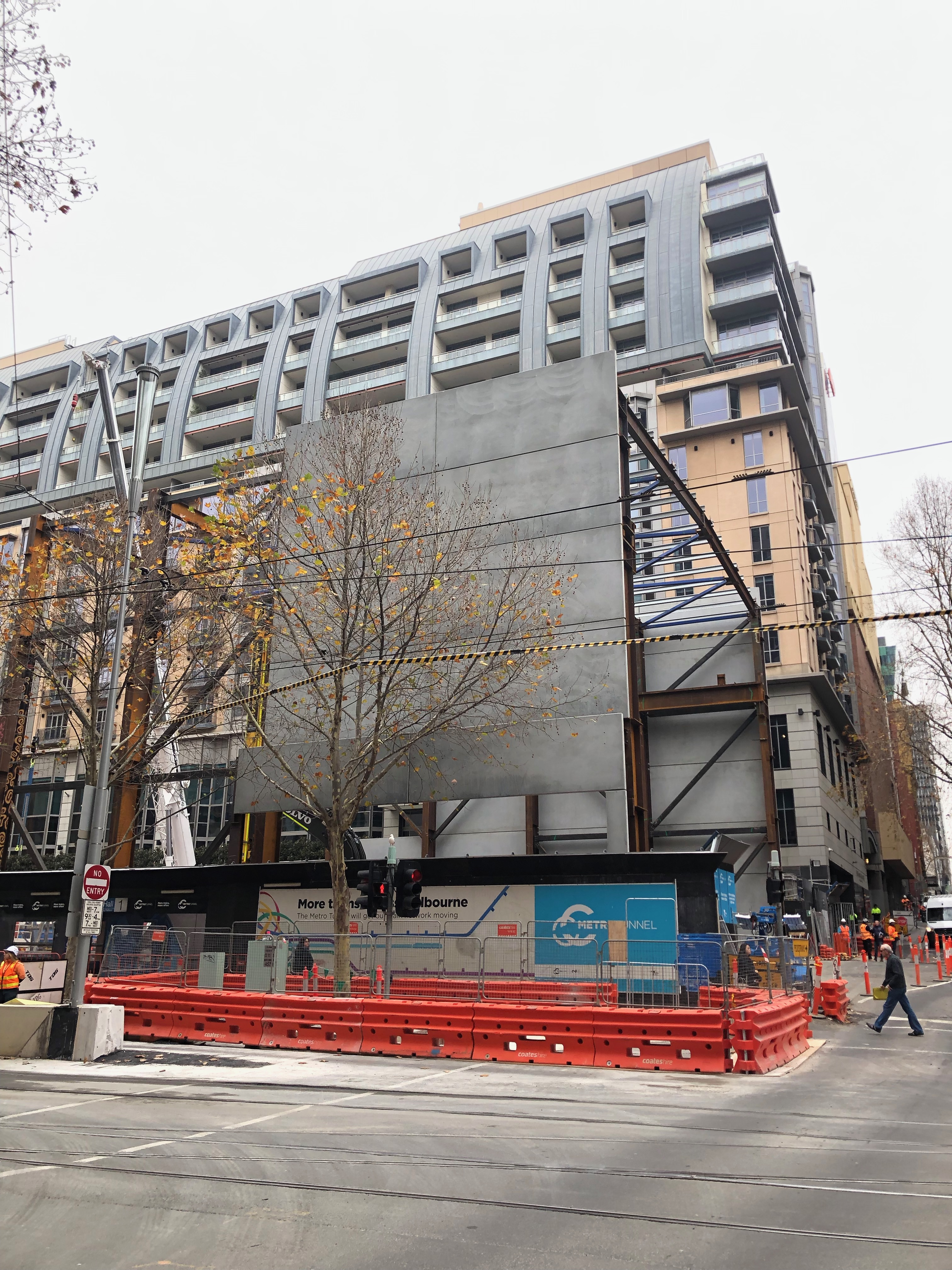
Installation of concrete acoustic shed to shield construction at City Square, 2019.

In May 2020, major traffic changes were put in place near Flinders Street in order to improve safety around large trucks entering acoustic sheds as a part of the project. Left turns from St Kilda Road to Flinders Street were removed, and the pedestrian crossing between St Paul's Cathedral and Federation Square was temporarily closed.

Two tunnel boring machines arrived at Town Hall station in April 2021 and were dismantled and extracted, signalling an end to tunnelling on the project. Road-headers broke through at the platform tunnels of Town Hall station in August 2021 as the major excavation phase on the two CBD stations neared completion. Town Hall was excavated to a depth of 33 m (108 ft) below street level, with the station platforms to sit 27 m (89 ft) below street level. This followed the completion of road-header excavation of the platform caverns at State Library in 2020.

In late 2022, acoustic sheds began to be dismantled at the Town Hall and Anzac station locations in order to allow construction of above-ground station structures.

On 5 October 2025, it was announced that major construction works at Town Hall station were complete, subsequently marking Town Hall as the second to last Metro Tunnel station to be completed.

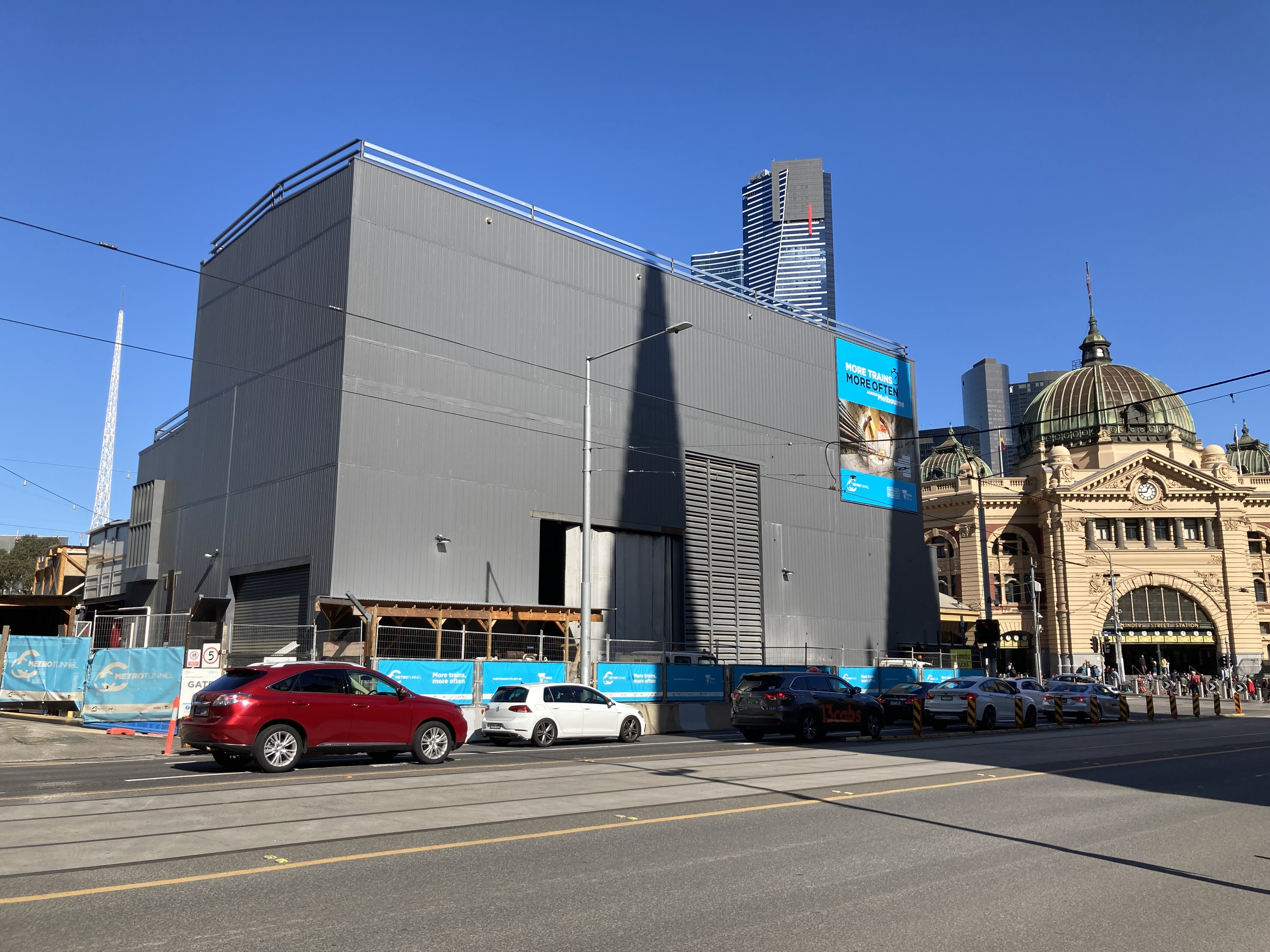
Acoustic box over the Federation Square entrance to Town Hall station, with Flinders Street station in the background, August 2022

== Design ==
The station has four entrances, the main entrance being located in City Square opposite Melbourne Town Hall, the second being located off Flinders Street, connected to Cocker Alley and Scott Alley. The third entrance is located within Federation Square, with the Square's information centre demolished in 2018 to construct the new entrance.

The final entrance is an underground connection to nearby Flinders Street station through the already existing Campbell Arcade connection. A number of changes were made to the design of the Campbell Arcade walkway to preserve the site's heritage character.

Initially it was planned to build the station using the cut-and-cover method, however this was changed so that the tunnels would run deeper underneath the ground in order to not disturb services, utilities and businesses on Swanston Street.

Like State Library station, Town Hall used a unique "trinocular" construction method involved the mining of three large, ping tunnels with vaulted ceilings. Large arches will define the 230 metre long platforms. Underneath City Square, the station's main entrance features a 14-metre high concourse space. Eight columns hold up a vaulted ceiling nicknamed "the crypt", an architectural reference to the nearby St Paul's Cathedral.

The station was designed by architects RSHP, Hassell and Weston Williamson.

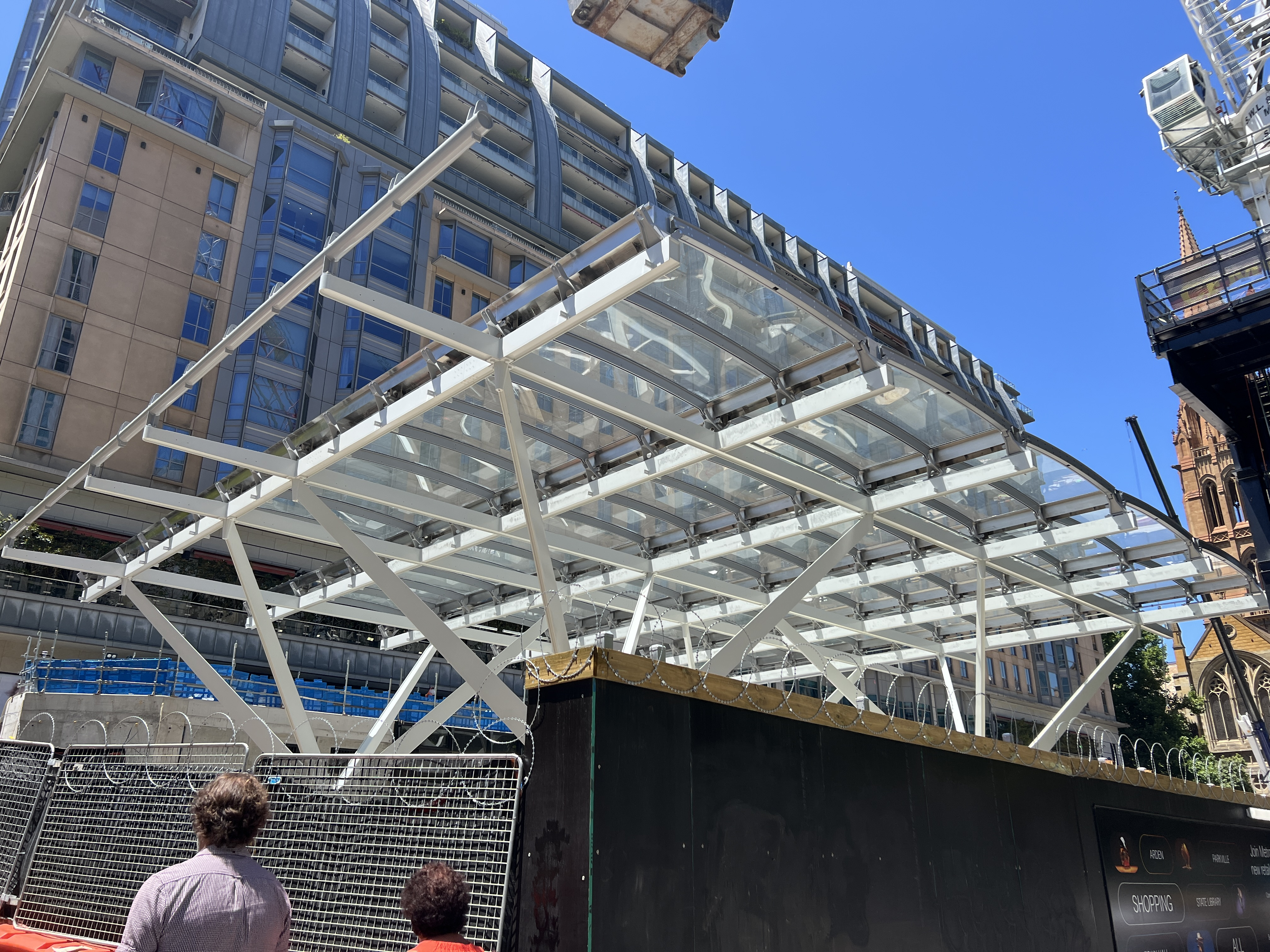
Glass City Square canopy under construction, 2025.

=== Over-site development ===
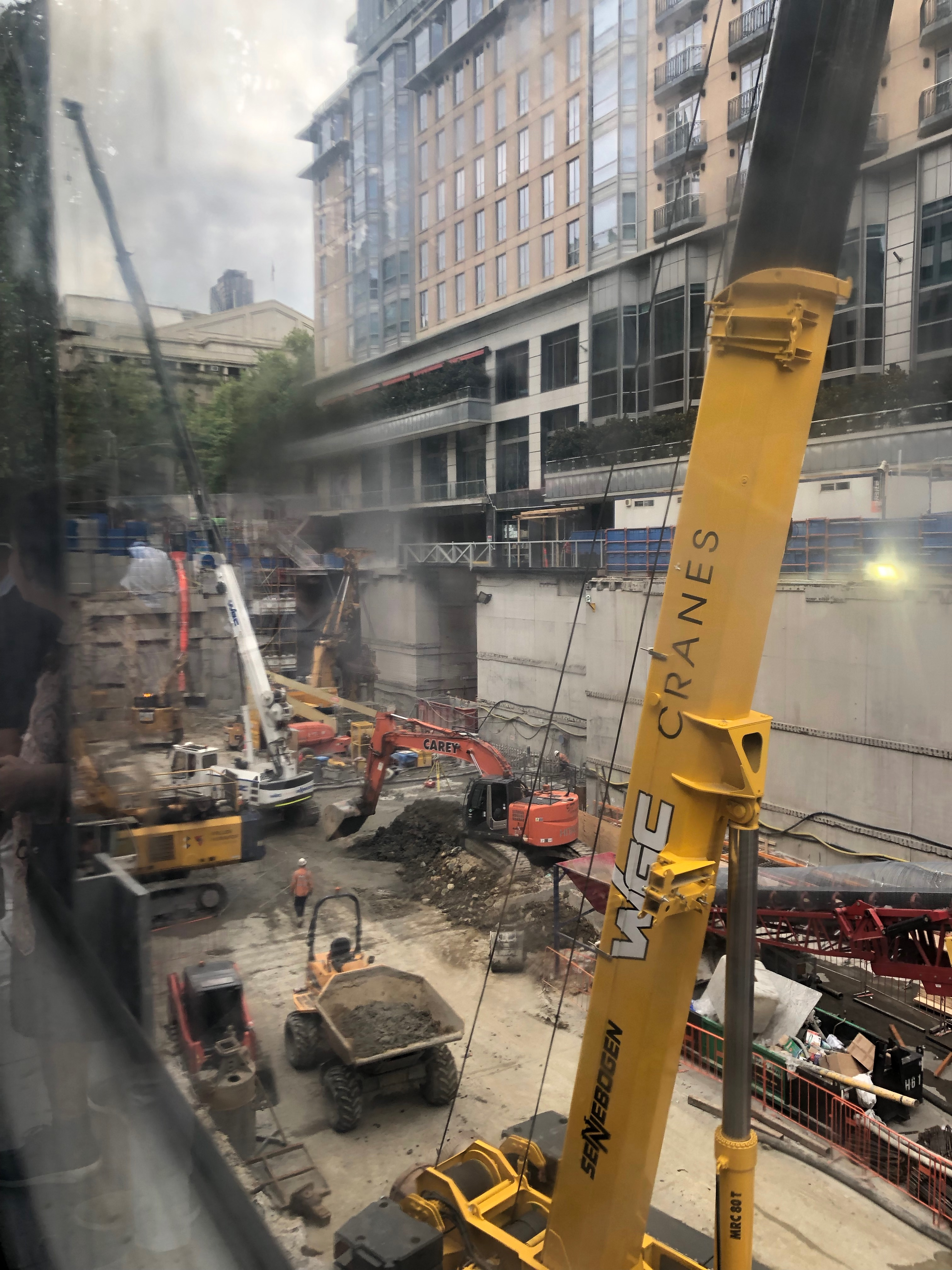
Excavation for Town Hall station at the site of City Square, February 2019

In December 2022, the developer Lendlease secured planning approval for the over-site development above the Flinders Street entrance to Town Hall. The nine-story office and retail development will feature station entrances opening to Swanston Street, Flinders Street and rebuilt arcades connecting to Cocker Alley and Scott Alley. The site is owned by the Victorian government and sits around the famous Young and Jackson Hotel and adjoins the Nicholas Building.

=== Art and sculpture ===
Mexican-Canadian artist Rafael Lozano-Hemmer was commissioned to create a permanent artwork for Town Hall as part of the Metro Tunnel's legacy artwork program. In 2024, Rail Projects Victoria stated that this commission had been cancelled due to difficulties from the COVID-19 pandemic, making Town Hall the only station to not have its own artwork.

In 2025, Rail Projects Victoria announced that Australian artist Maree Clarke was commissioned to create artwork for Town Hall's Federation Square entrance, titled Barerarerungar. The work will span 45 meters across 30 glass panels, consisting of photographs and line drawings that "[weave] together the cultural and ecological narratives of the five clans of the Kulin Nations." Clarke is also responsible for the line-wide artwork program titled Tracks, which is embedded into the platform floor at all Metro Tunnel stations.

A number of artworks and sculptures will be returned to the Town Hall sites once construction has finished, including the King Neptune sculpture by Melbourne artist Charles Bush. The King Neptune sculpture sat above the entrance to Port Phillip Arcade on Flinders Street, which was demolished for the station. The famous statue of ill-fated explorers Burke and Wills was removed from City Square in 2017 and is planned to return to the corner of Collins and Swanston Streets after the completion of the station. The John Mockridge Fountain water wall will also be returned and relocated to the northern edge of City Square along Collins Street.

== Town Hall station precinct ==
As part of the construction of Town Hall station, the City Square precinct is set to be rebuilt as a public gathering and events space. There will be 70 new bike parking spaces built to cope with increasing demand, as well as improved tram interchanges on Flinders, Collins, and Swanston streets. A new tram connection is planned to be built as part of the Metro Tunnel, allowing trams to turn onto Flinders Street from the current tram terminus on Elizabeth Street.

== Station layout ==
G	Street level	Entrances/Exits
B1M	Collins St Concourse	Walkway
B1	Collins St Concourse	Retail, walkway
B1	Federation Square Concourse	Walkway
B1	Swanston Street Concourse	Retail, toilets, walkway
B2	Collins St Concourse	Retail, toilets, walkway
B2	Federation Square Concourse	Walkway
B2	Swanston Street Concourse	Concourse, passageway to Flinders Street station, Campbell Arcade
B3	Collins St Concourse	Concourse, customer service
B3	Federation Square Concourse	Walkway to platform
B3	Swanston Street Concourse	Walkway to platform
B4; Platforms	Platform 1	Sunbury line towards Sunbury (State Library) →
B4; Platforms	Island platform, doors will open on the right
B4; Platforms	Platform 2	← Pakenham line towards East Pakenham (Anzac) ← Cranbourne line towards Cranbourne (Anzac)

== Transport links ==
=== Train ===
Passengers can transfer from Town Hall Station to Flinders Street Station via the Degraves Street Subway to connect with other Metro and V/Line services.

- Hurstbridge line all stations and limited stop services to Hurstbridge
- Mernda line all stations and limited stop services to Mernda
- Lilydale line all stations and limited stop services to Lilydale
- Belgrave line all stations and limited stop services to Belgrave
- Glen Waverley line all stations and limited stop services to Glen Waverley
- Alamein line weekday all stations and limited stop services to Alamein
- Sandringham line all stations to Sandringham
- Frankston line all stations and limited express services to Frankston
- Gippsland line V/Line services to Traralgon & Bairnsdale
- Craigieburn line all stations and limited stop services to Craigieburn
- Upfield line all stations and limited stop services to Upfield
- Werribee line all stations to Werribee
- Williamstown line all stations to Williamstown
- Flemington Racecourse line express services to Showgrounds and/or Flemington Racecourse (special event days only)

=== Tram ===
Yarra Trams operates 15 services connecting with Town Hall station via Swanston Street, Collins Street, and Flinders Street

Swanston Street

- : East Coburg – South Melbourne Beach
- : Melbourne University – Malvern East
- : Melbourne University – Malvern
- : Moreland – Glen Iris
- : Melbourne University – Kew
- : Melbourne University – Brighton East
- : Melbourne University – Carnegie
- : Melbourne University – Camberwell

Collins Street

- : Victoria Harbour (Docklands) – West Preston
- : St Kilda – Victoria Gardens
- : Victoria Harbour (Docklands) – Balwyn North
- : Port Melbourne – Box Hill

Flinders Street

- : Waterfront City Docklands – Wattle Park
- : Central Pier Docklands – Vermont South
- : City Circle
