= Centre Place, Melbourne =

Street in Melbourne, Australia

Centre Place Victoria
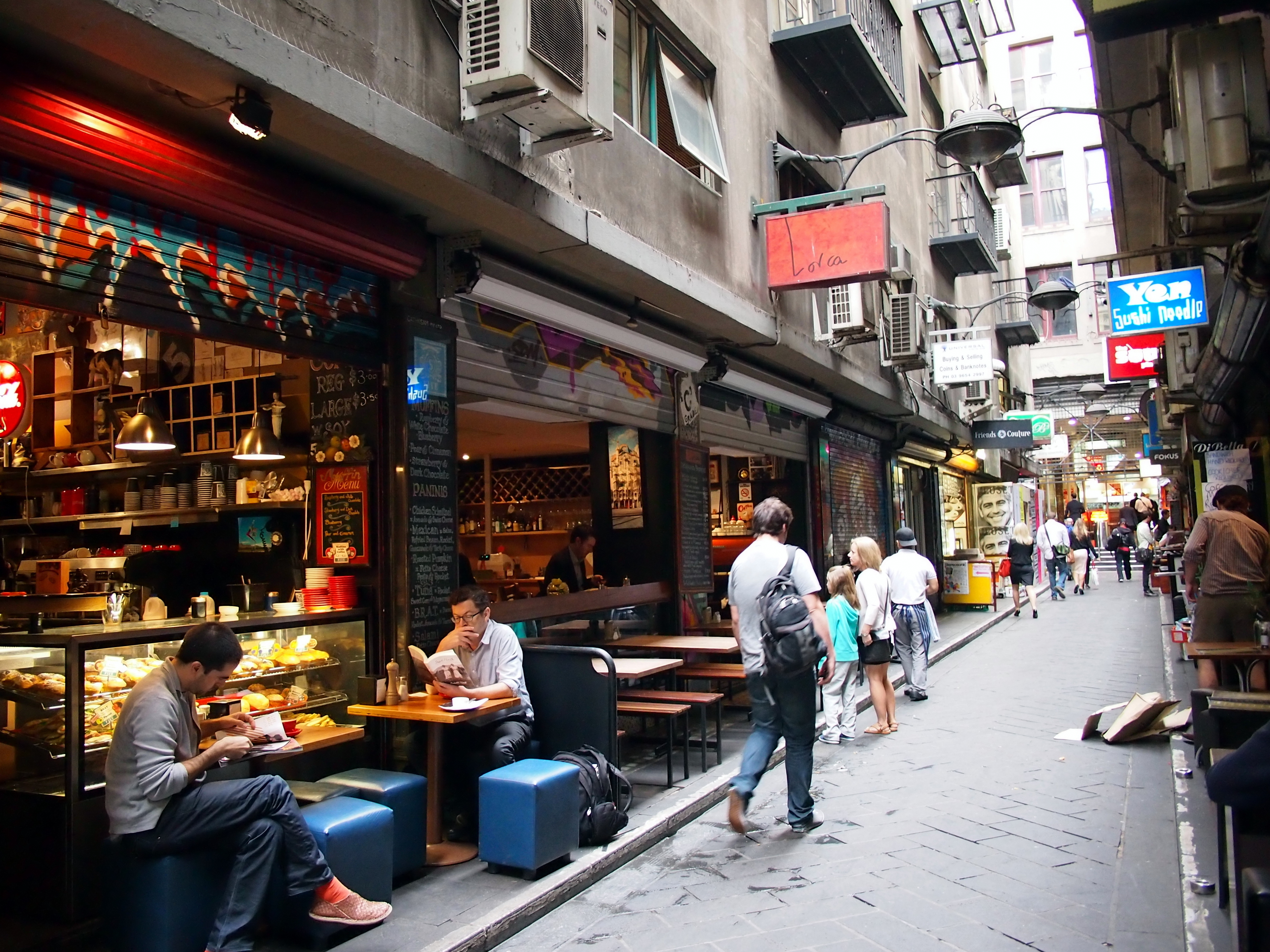
- Centre Place in 2012
- Coordinates: 37.8165°S 144.9655°E

General information
- Type: Street
- Location: Melbourne
- Length: 50 m (200 ft)
- Tourist routes: City of Melbourne Walks: Arcades & Lanes, The Cosmopolitan

Major junctions
- North end: Collins Street
- South end: Flinders Lane

Location(s)
- LGA(s): City of Melbourne

Centre Place is a laneway and pedestrian precinct in Melbourne, Australia. It runs north from Flinders Lane to Collins Street, between Elizabeth Street and Swanston Street.

The laneway is famous for its vibrant bars, cafes, restaurants and boutiques. It also features some of Melbourne's most well-known examples of street art and graffiti and the precinct has been used in tourism campaigns for the city.

== Location ==
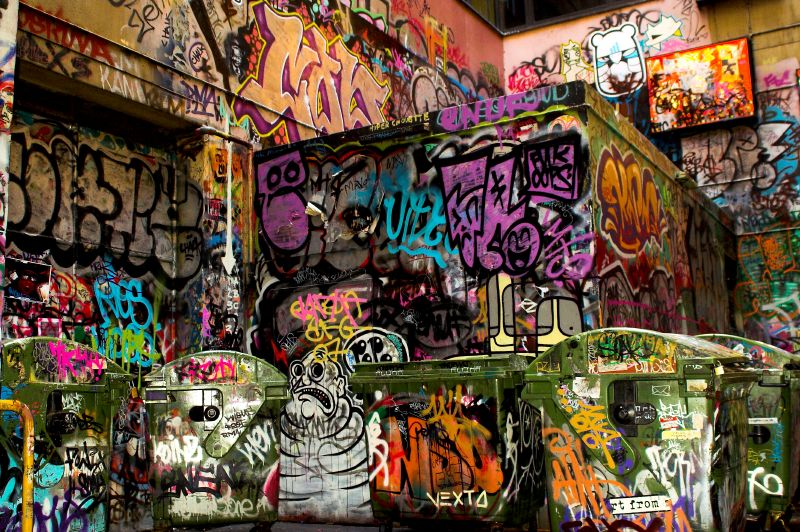
Centre Place Graffiti and Street Art

Located within the original Hoddle Grid on which Melbourne's streets were designed, Centre Place has become an important thoroughfare for pedestrians. From Flinders Street station it is common to travel through the underground Campbell Arcade to Degraves Street, and then via Centre Place to the Centreway Arcade to reach Collins Street. This forms a partially undercover route through art spaces, cafés, shops and iconic laneways.

The lane hooks sharply left midway to Collins Street, making the road undesirable for vehicles, hence its status and use as a pedestrian precinct. The laneway is overlooked by numerous residences and their balconies.

== History ==
Originally called Cummings Alley, the street wound around warehouses in the 1890s and the western portion was lined with urinals. By 1915 Cummings Alley had been joined to Collins Street via Centreway Arcade and was renamed Centre Court.

Centre Place became one of the 'first generation of revitalised laneways' in the 1980s. Council and State Governments at this time recognised the importance of preserving and revitalising the laneways of Melbourne. They worked to attract new boutique shops and cafés with street exposure.

The revitalised lane subsequently became popular with shoppers. Nearby retailers and businesses have also embraced the precinct, with the office and retail building at 271 Collins Street cutting an access point through to Centre Place in their building, highlighting its importance and desirability.

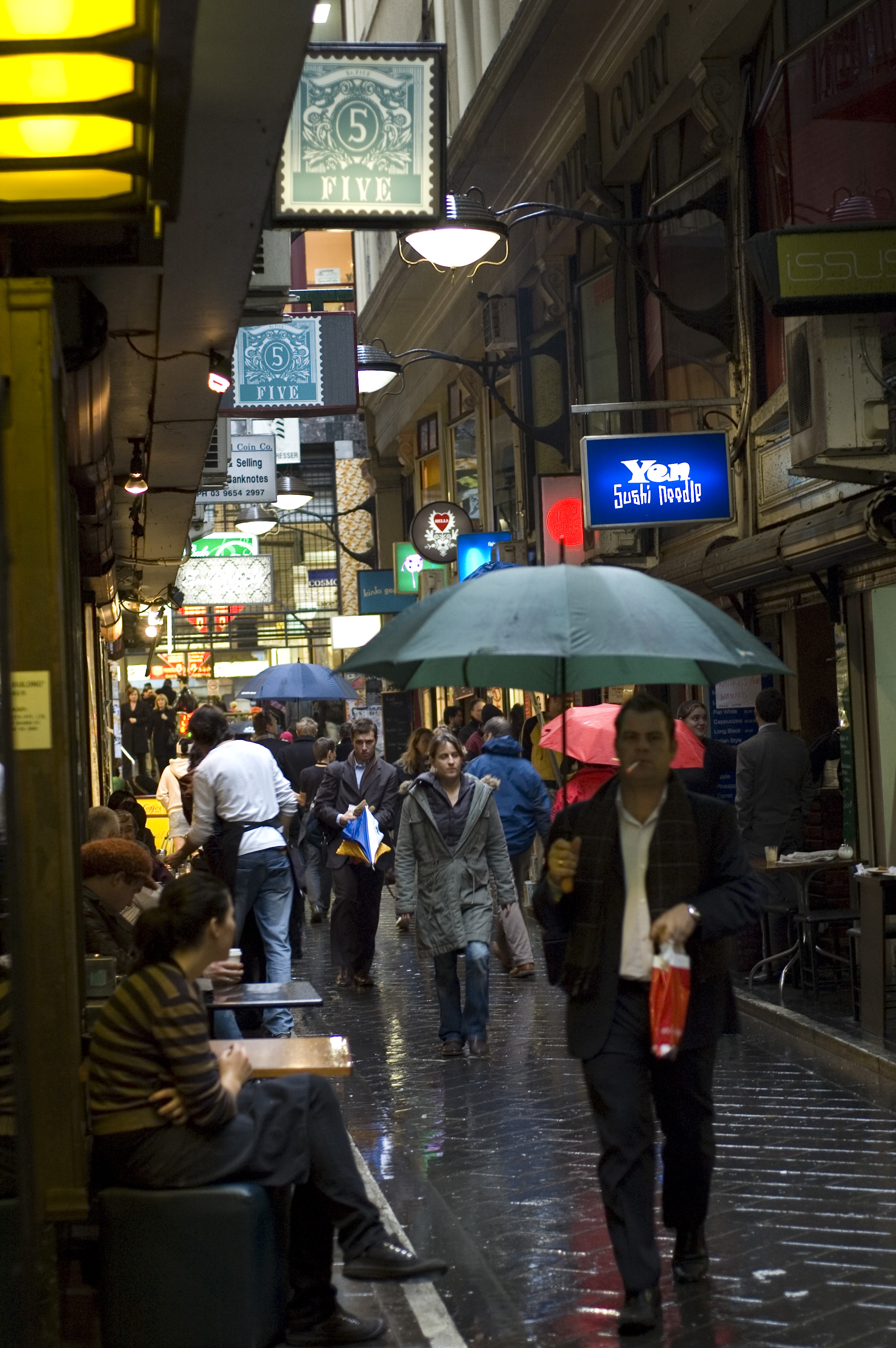
Looking north along Centre Place
