= United Kingdom Hotel =

Coordinates: 37.7872°S 144.9936°E

Clifton Hill McDonald's
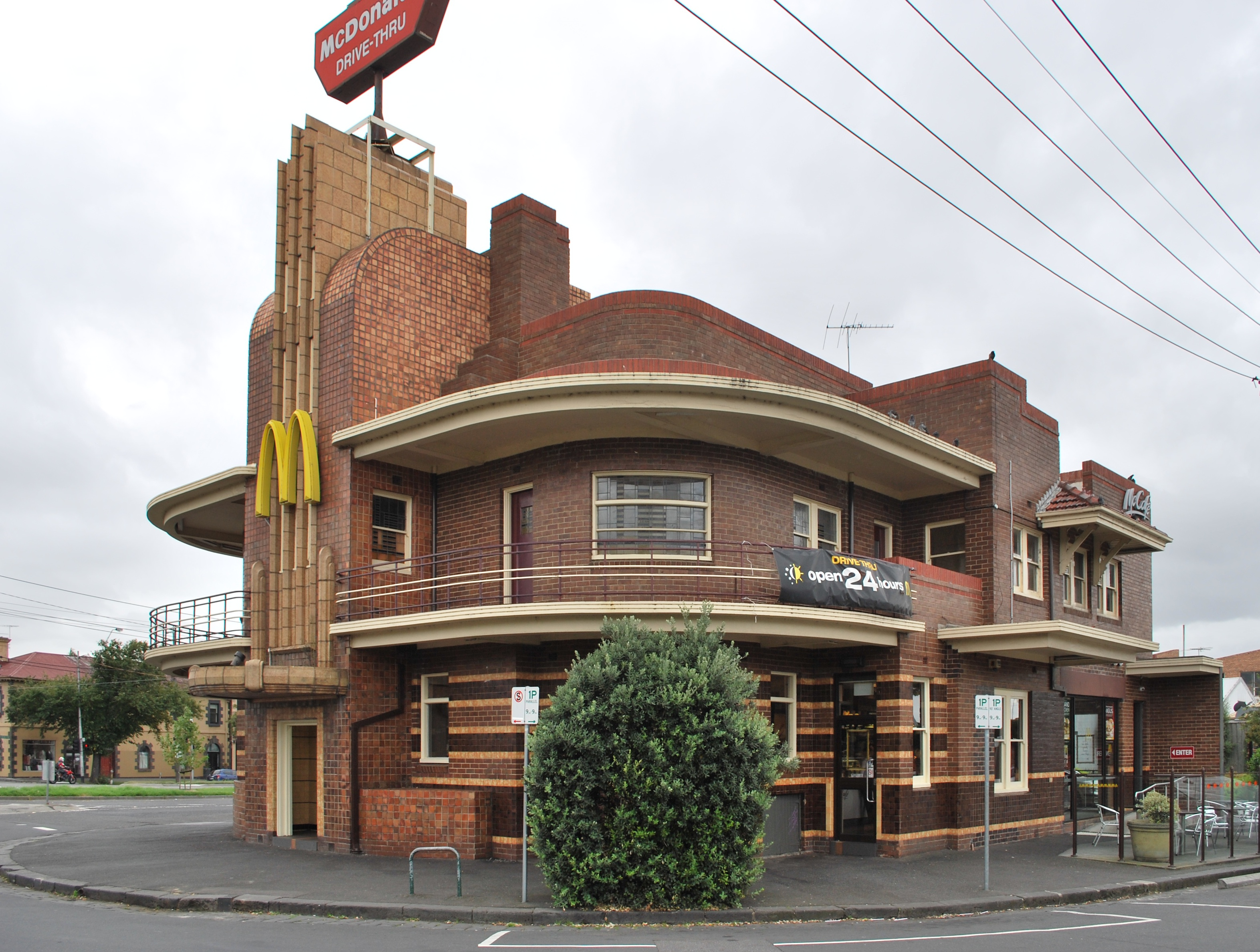
- Clifton Hill McDonalds in 2011
- Former names: United Kingdom Hotel
- Alternative names: Art Deco McDonald's

General information
- Architectural style: Art Deco, Moderne
- Year built: 1938

Design and construction
- Architect: James Wardrop

The former United Kingdom Hotel is a historic pub in Clifton Hill, Victoria, Australia; that currently houses a McDonald's restaurant. Designed by James Wardrop in 1938, it is regarded as one of the best examples of jazz moderne architecture in Melbourne, and its current status as a McDonald's has led it to be described as one of the "quirkiest" buildings on the Victorian Heritage Register.

== Architecture ==
The United Kingdom Hotel building is a two-storeyed brick hotel on a prominent triangular site overlooking the intersection Heidelberg Road and Queens Parade.

The style of the hotel is an interpretation of Moderne architecture by its architect James Wardrop. It has bold horizontal and vertical elements, such as brick banding, a stepped parapet, and a glazed terra cotta tiled tower.

The United Kingdom Hotel has been called a three-dimensional comparison to Wardrop's previously designed Art Deco Alkira House—built in 1936. Wardrop is most well known for designing the Shrine of Remembrance with Phillip Hudson.

== History ==
The site of the United Kingdom Hotel has had a hotel since as early as 1880. By 1906, the building was demolished and a replacement was built.

In 1938, the current hotel was built for its owner Carlton & United Breweries. The pub was delicensed in 1988, before it was turned into a McDonald's restrauant. Because of the heritage rules, the pub only underwent small modifications for its conversion, and both the interior and the exterior has remained largely intact. The book McAtlas lists it as Australia's best McDonald's location.
