= Harry Winbush =

Australian architect (1903–1990)

- Born: 15 October 1903; Brunswick, Victoria
- Died: 30 May 1990 (aged 86)
- Occupation: Architect
- Awards: Paul Harris Rotary International Fellow

Harry Stephen Winbush (born 1903) was an architect and educator who practised in Melbourne, Australia. He is best known as the head of the architecture course at what is now RMIT University from 1943 to 1968.

== Early life ==
Although Harry was born in Melbourne in 1903, his early years were spent in Toora, Gippsland, where his parents, William Winbush, a builder, and Bessie Shallcross, had met and were married in 1902. His mother's parents, William and Elizabeth Shallcross, were a major influence on Harry's life, as they were devout Christians, an influence he maintained throughout his life. After his mother's death in 1918, Harry moved to Melbourne to study at Brunswick Technical School, under Percy Everett, who was to go on to be the Chief Architect of the Public Works Department in the 1930s. He did well in his studies gaining a scholarship to the Melbourne Technical College (now RMIT University) and then studied further in London in the late 1920s. On his return to Melbourne in the early 1930s during the depression, he was unable to find work, and sold products in Hamilton door to door to earn a living.

After further studies at Melbourne University he set up practice in 1934 in Queen Street.

== Career ==
=== Architectural commissions ===
During his professional career he designed a huge range of residential, commercial and institutional buildings from the late 1930s into the 1960s.

He found early success with fire stations in Box Hill (1935) Port Melbourne (1938), which combined gable roofed brick residential blocks with horizontal Moderne style truck garage entries, and the more purely Modernist example at East Kew (1941).

He designed sporting infrastructure including the main grandstand, the reinforced concrete A.F. Showers Pavilion, at Windy Hill, Essendon the home of the Essendon Bombers football club, in 1938 (demolished in the 1990s).

His own house on the corner of Fletcher and Nicholson Streets, Essendon built in the 1930s is a striking example Art Deco.

He also undertook pioneering examinations such as Obsolescence in Residential Properties in the Australian Property Institute Journal c1938, and during WW2 Camouflaging of buildings around Melbourne, and Camouflaging of the gun emplacements at Point Nepean (the entrance to Port Philip Bay).

He designed a theatre for the Essendon Society of Arts, as well as hospitals situated in Essendon and Greensborough-Diamond Valley (1952). He designed one of the first of the 'new-generation' of indoor sporting facilities - the ten-pin bowling alley, in Essendon in 1962 (demolished).

He also designed the Moonee Ponds Trugo club as well as public libraries, one in Essendon (1964), and a striking Brutalist one featuring off-form concrete arches in Glenroy (1971).

=== Academic positions ===
Winbush was appointed, in 1943, head of the Melbourne Technical College, Department of Art and Architecture which was to become the Department of Architecture and Design at the Royal Melbourne Institute of Technology (RMIT). He was responsible for the management of the education of thousands of students.

The Interior Design Association of Australia was organised in 1948 by RMIT students in the Interior Decoration. The course was reorganised by Winbush as a four-year diploma Interior Design course.

He retired from his position as head of RMIT Architecture and Design in 1968.

=== Professional positions ===
In 1949, the Royal Australian Institute of Architects (RAIA) established a Joint Board of Architectural Education. It was this Board which became the vehicle through which the profession directly influenced architectural education in Australia through the accreditation of both courses and educational institutions. Winbush was a member of that first Board.

He was appointed President of the RAIA, 1955–57.

Winbush was a graduate of Melbourne University and a Fellow of the Royal Australian Institute of Architects (FRAIA) and also a Fellow the Royal Institute of British Architects (FRIBA). He went on to become a member of the Melbourne University, Faculty of Architecture.

He was chairman of the Architects' Registration Board of Victoria. As a councillor of the National Trust of Victoria he was actively engaged in the preservation of Victoria's historic buildings.

== No place like home ==
During the 1960s, new houses were being built across the ever-expanding suburbs of Melbourne. He was asked to prepare feature articles for the Melbourne Sun newspaper detailing his comprehensive ‘road–tests’ of those homes. The column was titled, No place like home and ran every week from March 1964 until June 1973. The University of Melbourne, Department of Architecture reported:

The Melbourne 'Sun' introduced a new feature to appear weekly on Tuesdays—"No Place Like Home" written by Mr. Harry Winbush, head of the School of Architecture at the Royal Melbourne Institute of Technology. Besides the expected general information for the prospective homeowner, on finance, renovations, decorations, etc; the column assesses the stock range of builders' houses for sale. A worthwhile analysis, for it points out not only what the buyer gets for his money, but also what he doesn't get (e.g. sewerage facilities, polished floors, fences etc); and it is also critical of fittings and planning. The level of the column drops to catch-phrases however with remarks such as "The feature wall of stained and varnished pine in the family living area is a happy thought." The service is apparently directed towards readers who find the "Age" R.V.I.A. Small Homes Service too highbrow, or at 10 guineas per plan, too expensive.

== Rotary International ==
Winbush was an active member of Rotary International for nearly 50 years and was held in high regard by his fellow members. He was President of the Essendon club in 1951–52. In 1952 he designed for Rotary a "Pioneers Retreat" (and as described in the Rotary Club history), "a beautiful cream-brick building in the sylvan setting of Queens Park, Moonee Ponds". Another project which Essendon Rotary supported was 'Gladswood Lodge', (with Winbush known as its 'honorary architect'), which continues to provide care for the aged. He also instigated the forming of the Brunswick Rotary Club in 1953.

Essendon Rotary Club, at that time had established and continued to assist in the maintenance of 'Rowallan Recreation and Adventure Camp' set in 74 hectares (183 acres) of natural bushland in the Catherine Valley, Gisborne for Boy Scouts and Girl Guides.

Winbush was recognised as a Paul Harris Fellow, an honour recognising outstanding service and represented Rotary Australia at international conferences.

== See also ==
- List of Art Deco buildings in Melbourne
- John L. Wimbush An Uncle of Harry Winbush
