= Majorca Building =

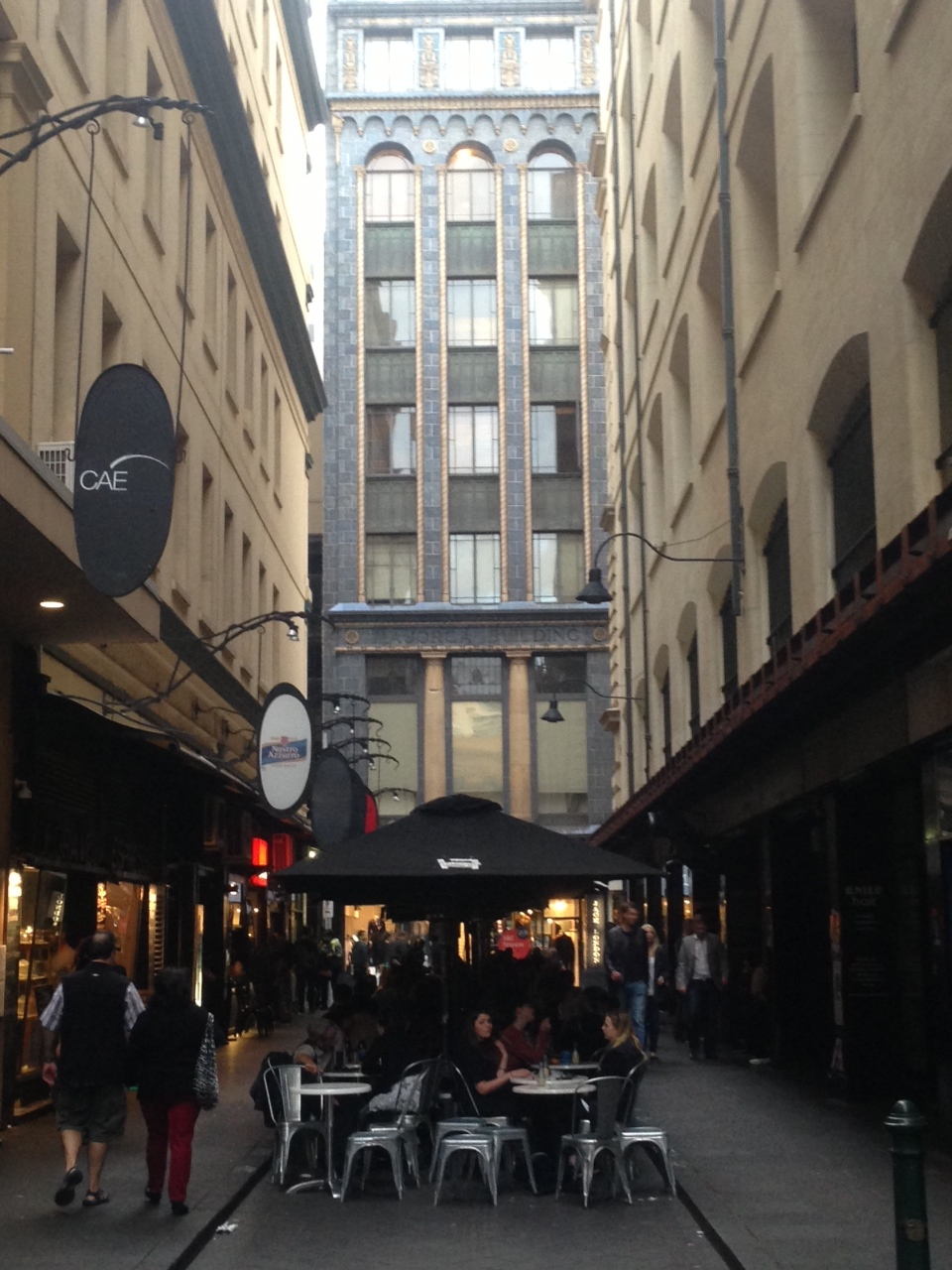
- The building viewed from Degraves Street
- Interactive map of the Majorca Building area

General information
- Type: Offices and Apartments
- Location: Melbourne, Australia
- Coordinates: 37°49′00.0″S 144°57′55.8″E
- Construction started: 1928
- Completed: 1930
- Owner: L.R. Reed

Height
- Roof: 32.1 metres (105 ft)
- Top floor: 8

Technical details
- Floor count: 8

Design and construction
- Architect: Harry Norris

The Majorca Building is a historic office building in Melbourne, Australia, completed in 1930. Located at 258-260 Flinders Lane, it was designed by Harry Norris in an exotic Spanish /Moorish style, in strongly coloured faience.

== History ==
Flinders Lane was in the heart of the rag trade in Melbourne and was lined with fabric warehouses.

The Majorca Building was built on the corner of Centre Place, which provided access to the Centreway Arcade, and it terminates the vista looking north along Degraves Street, another laneway. Together, they provided access through from Flinders Street and its railway station to Collins, becoming a busy pedestrian thoroughfare.

The Majorca Building Co was formed in 1927, with the directors being Alfred and George Nicholas, who had made a fortune from Aspro, and built the nearby Nicholas Building in 1926, also designed by Norris. The brothers had been born in the hamlet of Majorca north of Ballarat, and likely named the company and the building after their home town.

The Majorca Building was originally designed as office space, with shops at ground level, and more shops at first floor level.

In 1993 it was converted to residential apartments.

== Design ==
Architect Harry Norris was a frequent visitor to the United States in the interwar period, inspiring designs in styles that had not been seen in Victoria before, including Spanish Colonial Revival and Art Deco. Majorca House has a general form similar to earlier Flinders Lane buildings, with a tall base, surmounted by tall narrow aches, but in an entirely original style, blending classical, Spanish and Moorish elements, no doubt inspired by the Spanish island of Majorca. The facade is executed entirely in faience, mostly in a deep oceanic blue, with foliated and rope moulded ornament in gold and, and detailing above the shop fronts that includes fish and shells. The foyer, which features terrazzo and inlaid stone, is especially rich.

When nearing completion in August 1929 it was hailed as an important "change in the beauty of Melbourne's architecture".

A Heritage Victoria database entry for Majorca House, says: "The Moorish influence in its terracotta façade places it firmly within the Melbourne tradition of exotic architecture in the late 1920s.", and that is Norris' best work incorporating faience.

The Majorca Building is a natural progression from Norris's other celebrated building in Spanish style, the Kellow Falkiner Car Showrooms on St Kilda Road, South Yarra, completed in 1928.

== Gallery ==
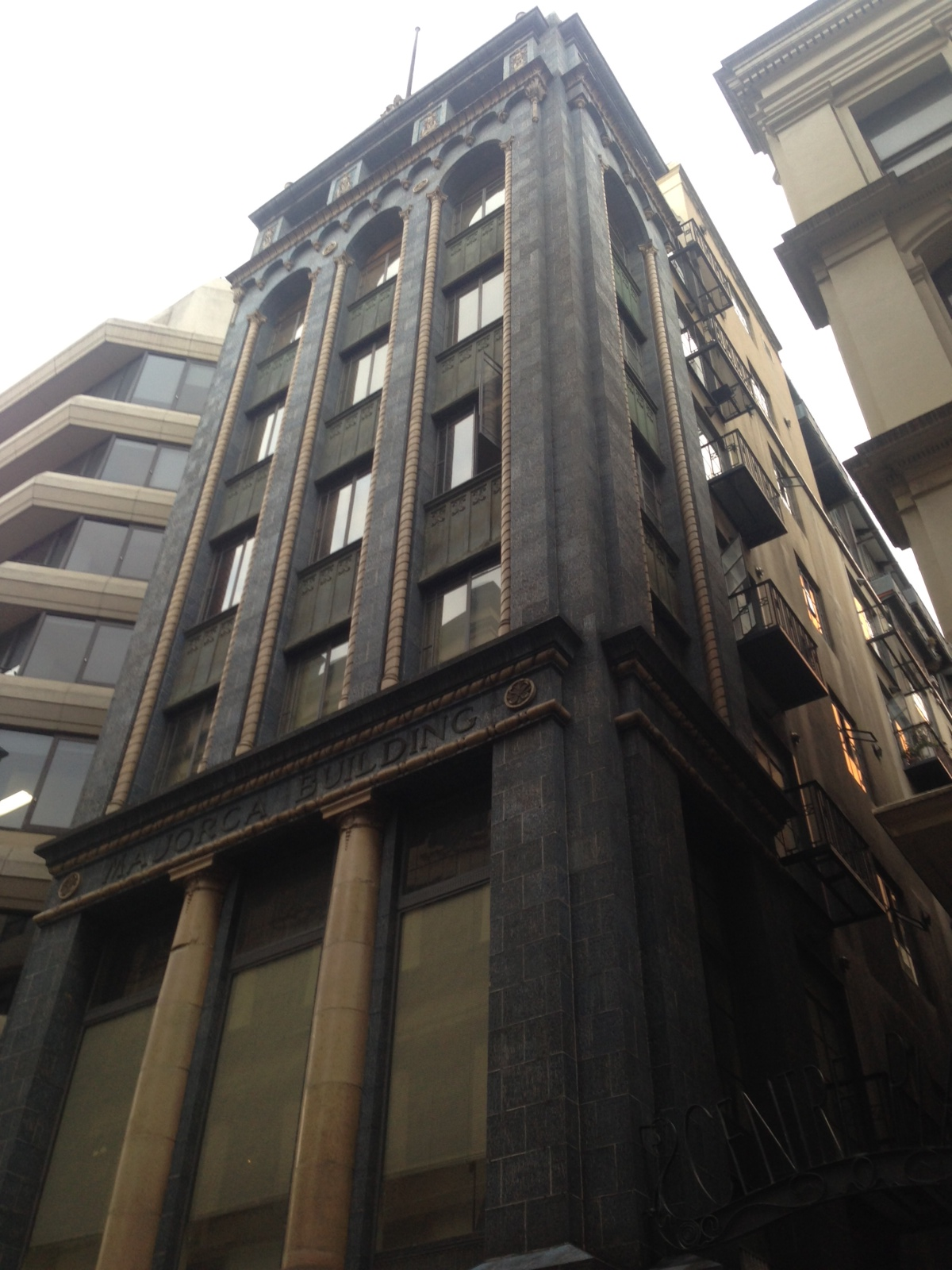
The Majorca Building viewed from Flinders Lane.

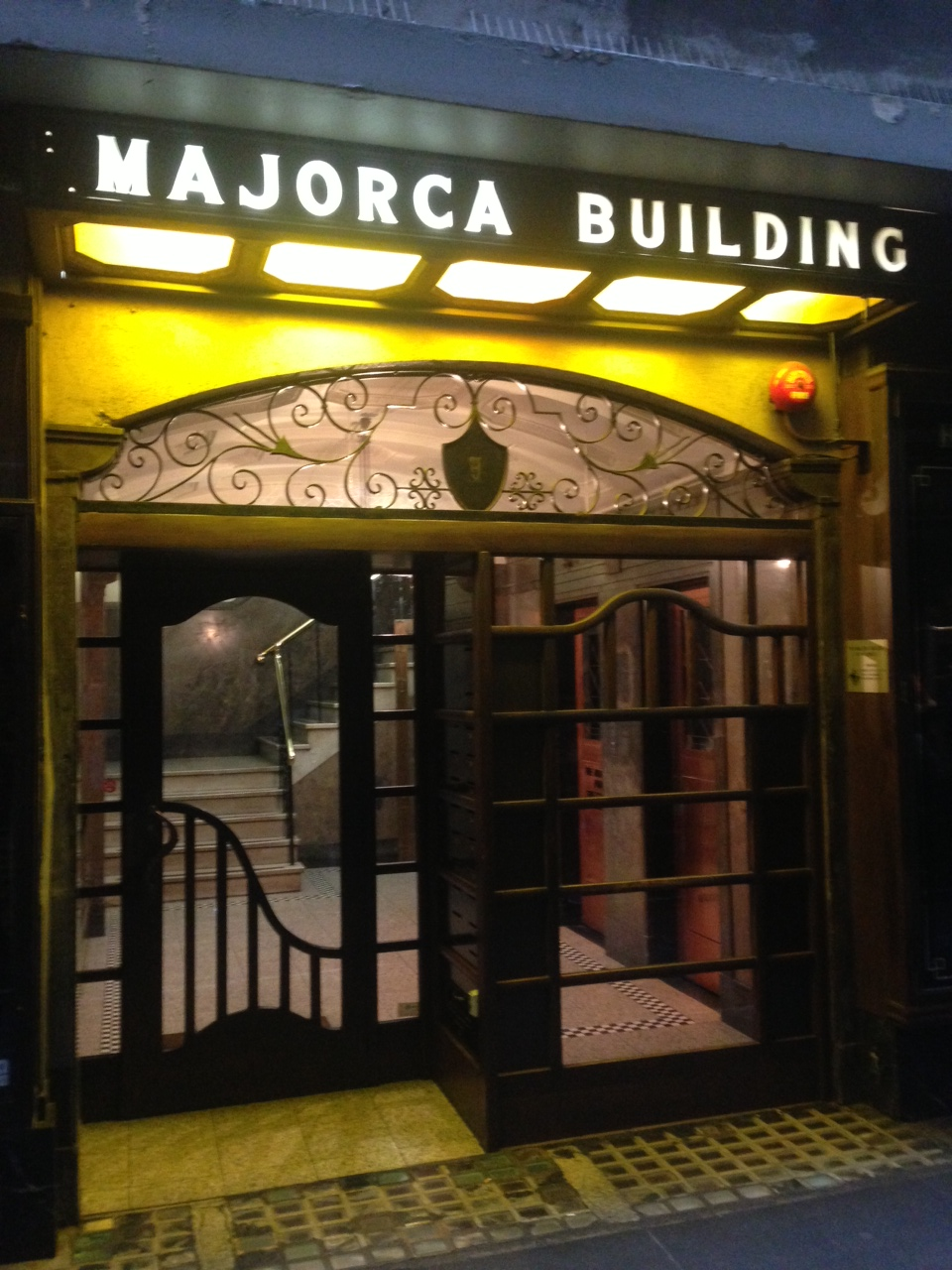
The building's street frontage.

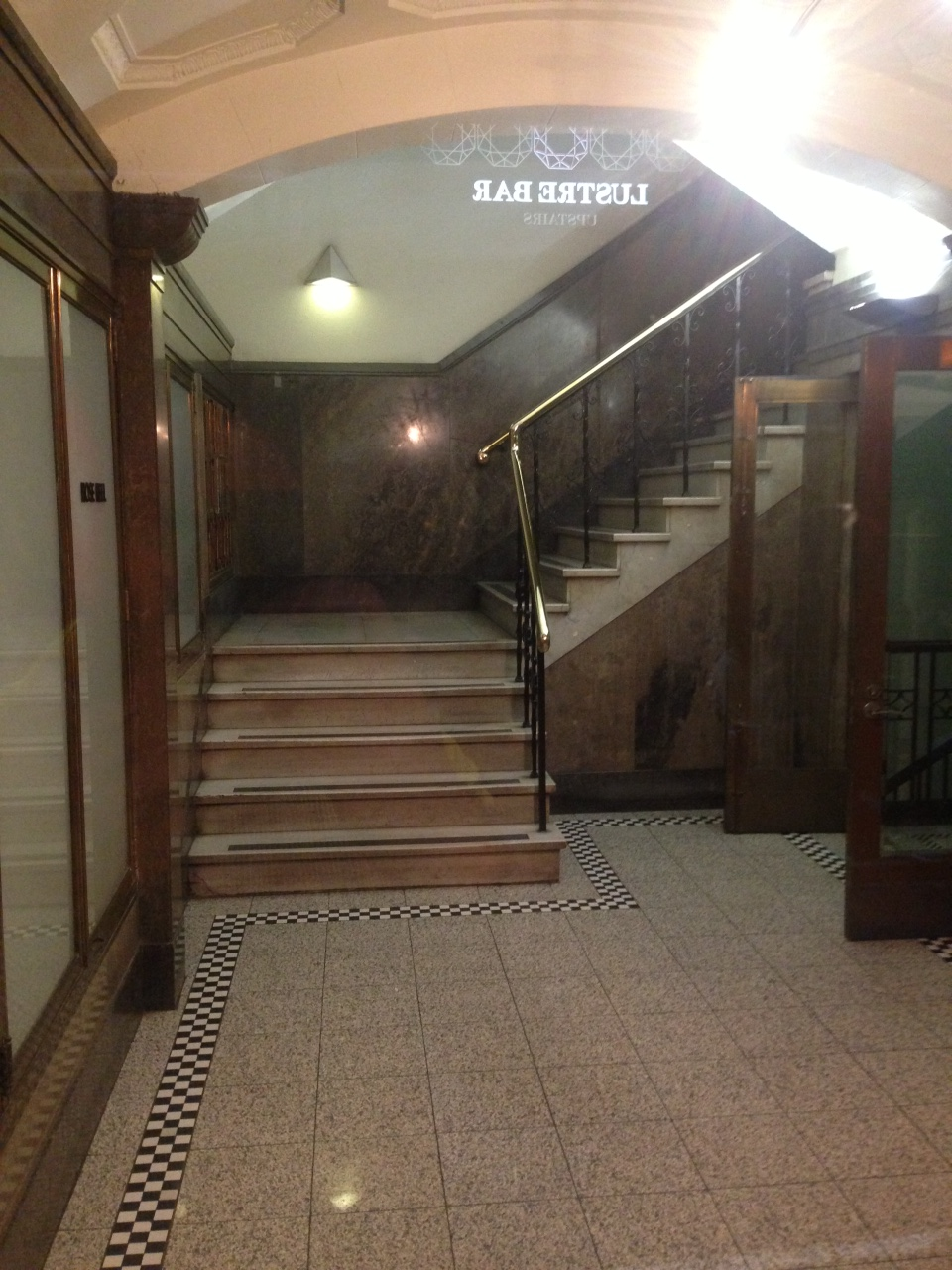
Majorca Building foyer, viewed from the street.

== See also ==
- Alkira House
- Architecture of Melbourne
