= Hudson and Wardrop =

The architectural firm of Hudson and Wardrop was formed by Philip Burgoyne Hudson (6 February 1887 – 1952) and James Hastie Wardrop MM (1891 – 25 July 1975), in 1919. Both were veterans of WWI who went on to study under Charles D'Ebro. They are best known for designing the Shrine of Remembrance in Melbourne.

== Hudson & Wardrop ==
After forming an alliance in 1919, Hudson and Wardrop entered the competition for the National War Memorial in 1923 and won first prize. The Shrine is known to be Melbourne's most important Public Monument. The design for the shrine was based on the Parthenon in Athens and the tomb of Mausolus, the Mausoleum of Halicarnassus and symbolizes both the democratic tradition for which the soldiers died and the eternity of their afterlife. In 1929 Hudson and Wardrop partnered with architect and engineer Kingsley Ussher particularly to check calculations for the 'eye of light' at the shrine.

== The proposal ==
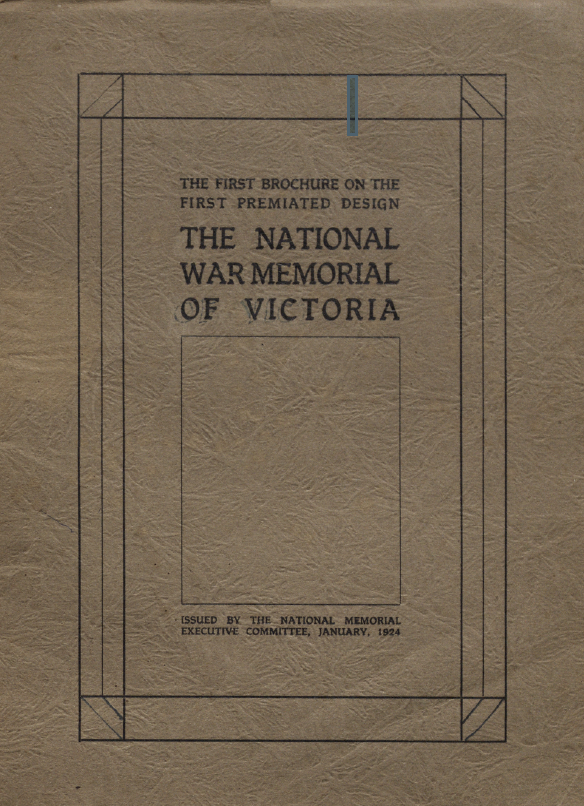
Cover, First Brochure

They compiled a booklet The First Brochure on the First Premiated (Note: Premiated: Required for prize judging) Design. The National War Memorial of Victoria, 1928. From the brochure:

Several months were devoted by the architects, Messrs. Hudson & Wardrop, to the consideration of the character of the Memorial. It was thought that in accordance with the established custom of observing on Armistice Day, (at the eleventh hour of the eleventh day of the eleventh month) a period of silence, the Memorial must be a silent one. Further, a Memorial to our country's sacrifice in the Great War calls neither for "A Shaft of Might" nor "An Arch of Triumph"; but for a "Shrine of Remembrance" which, by its nobility of mass and line will perpetually inspire men to dedicate themselves to the cause for which the Memorial stands.

The theme is Remembrance, and the design is indicative of Remembrance. It is Australian in feeling, in that it stands for the highest of Australian ideals - ideals we fought for—Patriotism, Sacrifice, Justice, and Freedom. Further, the climax of a pilgrimage to the Memorial is at "The Rock of Remembrance" lit by the eye of light (Note: The "Eternal Eye of Light" is a long aperture carefully drilled through a block of stone, designed to permit the passage of sunlight at 11 o'clock on 11 November.) and emblematically guarded by the best of virtues striven for by our glorious dead.

The Site has not an abrupt rise and calls for a structure rather growing out of the contour of the hill than rising abruptly from it. Further, the Memorial is so situated on the site that it will be clearly visible from the heart of the city and easy of access from all approaches—thus bringing the purpose of the Memorial into the daily lives of our citizens.It stands out and dominates the surrounding country, and will be a landmark for all shipping navigating Port Phillip.

== The company ==
In 1946 Robert F. Howden joined the firm as junior partner. A year later Stevenson joined to form Hudson Stevenson Partners. The sudden death of Hudson and the illness of Stevenson led Howden to run the practice. Hugh McLean joined, renaming the firm Hudson Stevenson Howden & McLean. Howden became senior partner followed by the death of Stevenson and the firm became both architects and engineers. It was renamed Howden and McLean and now continues as Howden & Wardrop Pty Ltd, Architects & Engineers at 24 Albert Road South Melbourne.

== Personal ==
Hudson was born in Auckland, New Zealand, the son of Charles Hudson, Railway Commissioner of Victoria. As a child he attended Wellington College in New Zealand and moved to The Friends College High School to continue his education in his early teens. In 1903 Hudson moved to Melbourne and attended Melbourne University to pursue a career in Architecture.

Hudson was articled to Anketell Henderson in 1904 and began a practice with D’Ebro over the period of 1904–09. Soon after he established a practice of his own in 1909. Hudson also began teaching architectural drafting with Harold Desbrowe-Annear and Haddon at the Working Mens College, now known as RMIT University.

A year later, he met Ethel Elise Vincent and was married on 14 December 1910. Ethel gave birth to one son and two daughters and lived in their home in Garden Vale which was designed by Hudson himself in 1914.

Born in 1891, James Hastie Wardrop was enlisted in A.I.F. in October 1915, and served in Europe before traveling to England to study briefly in 1919.

== Notable projects ==
=== Philip Hudson ===
- 1914: Own house at Garden Vale

Villa at Garden Vale.
Victoria House apartments 220 Clarendon Street, East Melbourne

- 1915: Geelong grammar school chapel in association wit Gerard Wight

Villa in Lansell Road, Toorak.

- 1919; Architect Philip B. Hudson of Melbourne is inviting

tenders for brick store and offices, for the Korumburra and District Co-operation Butter Factory Co.Ltd., Station Street Korumburra.

- 1924: National War memorial - Shrine of Remembrance, Melbourne in association with James Wardrop.
- 1933: Extension to factory Spencer Street, Melbourne.

Conversion of existing building, corner of Moore & Kavanagh streets.
2-storey home in Toorak.

- 1934: Doctors quarters, Austin Hospital.

South wing to Geelong College.
House in Moorakyne Avenue, Malvern.

- 1936: Melbourne University Union Building.

Electrolux factory, Alexandra Avenue, South Yarra [demolished]

- 1937: Boarding house at Geelong College.
- 1938: Conversion of warehouse on corner of Degraves street & Flinders Lane.
- 1939: Commercial Union building 411-3 Collins Street.

Mackie House, Geelong College

=== James Wardrop ===
- 1924: Shrine of Remembrance, Melbourne. in association with Philip Hudson
- 1924: Own house, 24 Alston Grove, East St. Kilda. A very similar design was also at Number 39 Balaclava Road, East St Kilda.
- 1934: Belmac Flats in Broadway ( in Elwood)
- 1936: Zaneth Manor, 33 Brighton Road, St Kilda
- 1937: Alkira House, Queen Street, City.
- 1938: Trumold Tyre Workshop, Queens Parade, Clifton Hill.
- 1938: United Kingdom Hotel (now McDonald's), Queens Parade, Clifton Hill.
- 1939: Three matching flat blocks at 125- 135 Mooltan Street, Travancore, Flemington. There is another matching one at no. 117.

== Awards and achievements ==
In 1907 Hudson won a RIVA Silver Medal for an Art Gallery competition, and in 1915 went on to win first prize in the competition to design the Geelong Grammar School’s chapel in association with Gerard Wight. He received a second RIVA silver medal in 1920 and was nominated as the president of RIVA from 1924 to 1926. In 1924 he won the most notable prize for the international competition for National War memorial - Shrine of Remembrance, Melbourne in association with James Wardrop.

In 1911 Wardrop won the RIVA silver medal for his design for the branch bank & Bronze for measured drawings. Two years later he was an elected associate of RIVA.
