= Centenary Hall =

- Exhibition St frontage of Centenary Hall

General information
- Location: 104-110 Exhibition Street, Melbourne, Victoria, Australia
- Coordinates: 37.813105°S 144.971367°E
- Completed: 1935
- Owner: Rolex Australia

Technical details
- Floor count: 7 floors (including basement level)
- Lifts/elevators: 1

Design and construction
- Architects: Hugh Philp and H. Geoffrey Bottoms

Centenary Hall is a building within the Melbourne CBD in Victoria, Australia, on the corner of Exhibition and Little Collins Streets.

== Description ==
Centenary Hall was designed by Hugh Philp and H. Geoffrey Bottoms, selected via a 1933 design competition conducted by the Victorian Protestant Hall Co. Ltd. Completed in 1935, the building's name references the 1934 centenary of the founding of Melbourne. Centenary Hall replaced an 1881 Protestant hall which in turn replaced the first hall on the site, built in 1847 on land purchased specifically for a Protestant hall in 1846 by the Loyal Orange Institution of Victoria.

The six-storey building uses a steel frame and rises to 120 feet above street level, short of the 132 ft limit then allowed by Council building regulations. The exterior is Moderne in style, featuring vertical ribbing and corner tower-like elements. A projecting balconette at first floor level is adorned with intricate pressed cement detail depicting the thistle and scrolls. There is bronze joinery around the Exhibition Street windows, originally for a car showroom, now subdivided into shops. A spacious lobby featuring the Loyal Orange Order star in the terrazzo floor leads to a wide marble stair to the first floor hall.

Centenary Hall was designed for multiple uses, with a basement supper room kitchen and pantry, ground floor showrooms, a large hall on the first floor capable of seating 450 persons, administrative offices on the second floor, and various clubrooms, rehearsal rooms on the third floor, with the top two for rent, and a caretaker's residence on the roof.

There is a different Centenary Hall, built at a similar time, at the Melbourne Showgrounds.

== Usage ==
Centenary Hall during World War II

The hall was originally used for meetings, performances and other events. Motor vehicle retailer Cheney's originally occupied the ground floor as a showroom, including a turntable near the window to raise and rotate the featured car or truck.

From 1942 to 1945 during World War II, the American Red Cross Service Club for American and Allied soldiers in Melbourne took over the building. Facilities included a 'rainbow grill' in the basement "where hamburgers, doughnuts, pies, and coffee – all done in the American style – are obtainable", a lounge and writing room on the ground floor, a dormitory for 142 troops and a gymnasium. The hall was used for lectures during the day and dances and shows during the evening. Dancing partners were rostered from 2,000 local female volunteers.

Centenary Hall was leased after World War II by the Victorian Government for the State Rivers and Water Supply Commission, and then purchased by the Government in 1961. Through the 1960s and early 1970s it was occupied by the Department of Labour and Industry.

In August 1976, the property was purchased at auction for $576,000 by a company associated with the Victorian division of the Liberal Party of Australia, Vapold Pty Ltd. This attracted political controversy and resulted in an inquiry into the conduct of the building's sale. The inquiry found that the (Liberal) Government took reasonable, proper and normal precautions to obtain a fair price and there was no unfair, unusual or improper advantage obtained by the purchaser.

Today, the building houses retail shops on the ground floor, the Victorian division of the Liberal Party of Australia, and the commercial art gallery Tolarno Galleries. Former Australian Prime Minister John Howard made the inaugural John Howard Lecture for the Menzies Research Centre at the hall in 2009.

In 2011, the City of Melbourne nominated for heritage protection the orange star motif made of patterned terrazzo in Centenary Hall's ground floor foyer.

Centenary Hall was sold in 2018 to luxury retailer Rolex Australia for $37.1 million.

== Gallery ==
Children and soldiers outside the American Red Cross Service Club at Centenary Hall during World War II

Signage above the entrance doorway
