= Australasian Catholic Assurance Building =

Historic building in Melbourne, Australia

Coordinates: 37.8157°S 144.9613°E

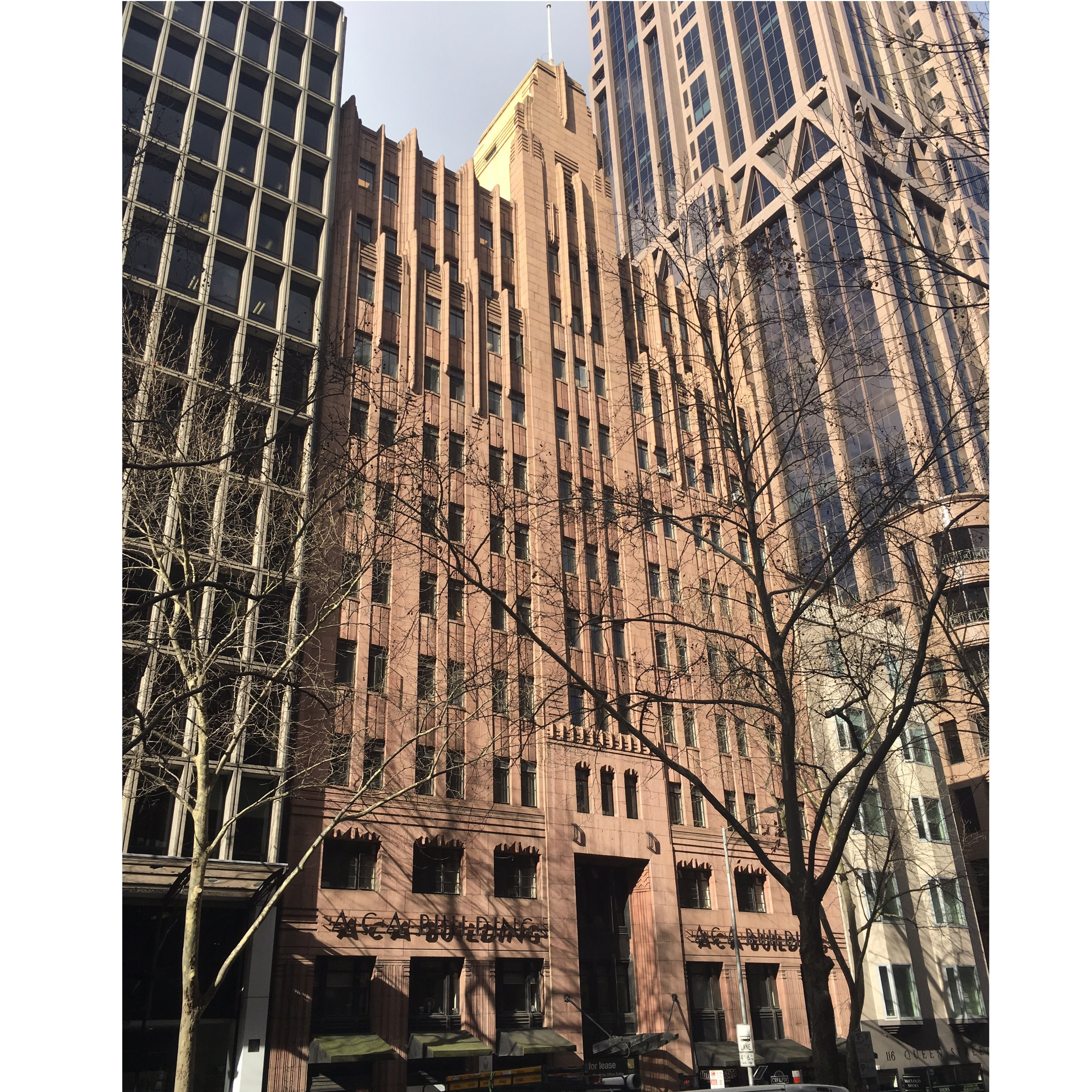
Australian Catholic Assurance Building

The Australian Catholic Assurance Building (ACA Building) is an Art Deco office building at 118-126 Queen Street, Melbourne, Victoria, Australia. It was built as the Victorian headquarters of Australian Catholic Assurance, a commercial insurance firm established with the aim of serving the Catholic community in Australia. The building was designed by Sydney-based architecture firm Hennessy & Hennessy, built in 1935-36, and has a twin in Sydney.

The building is one of the most notable Art Deco office buildings in the city, with a City of Melbourne and National Trust heritage listing.

== Architecture ==
The ACA Building is a clear example of Art-Deco; in Melbourne the vertically ribbed examples are described as "Commercial Gothic", due to their similarity with the first examples of this style, the strongly Gothic Manchester Unity Building. The ACA Building is unusual in that the material used on the facade is not the then typical cement render or faience, but rather "Benedict Stone", an artificial stone product manufactured by a company owned by the Brisbane Diocese of the Catholic Church. The stone shades in colour from darker at the base to lighter at the top of the 160-foot (49 m) tower.

The design is strikingly vertical, dominated by the stepped silhouette of the central tower-like element, a continuation of the separately expressed central bay 28 feet (8.5 m) above the interwar 132-foot (40 m) height limit. The tower is given further prominence by the setback of the top two office floors either side, and the projecting ribs of the top four floors which also step back, and continue beyond the parapet, creating a lively skyline.

The three level base is sparsely adorned, providing a platform for the verticality of the upper floors. The prominent entry is formed by a deep, two storey tall, inset within the central bay. The building is remarkably intact; the double height square bays of the ground floor are occupied by original bronze shopfronts, the prominent building name metal signage above is unchanged, and the lobby retains its black marble walls, signboard, light fittings and lifts.

The Sydney building, located on King Street and now known as Charles Plaza, was completed in early 1936. The facade, also in pink artificial stone, has exactly matching details, but is taller, and addresses a corner, and so appears less vertical.
