= Degraves Street =

Street in Melbourne, Victoria

Degraves Street Victoria
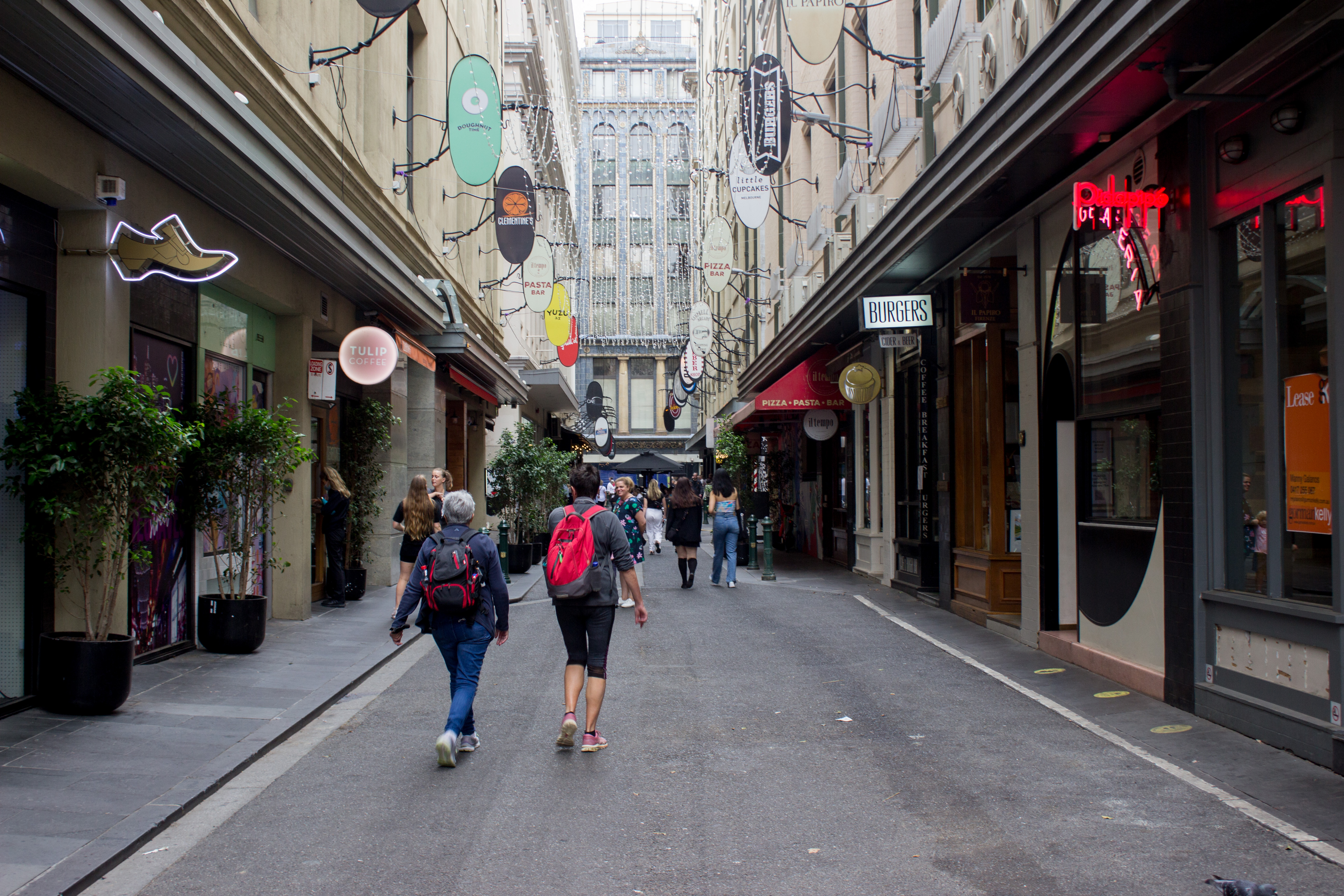
- Degraves Street in February 2022
- Coordinates: 37.8173386°S 144.9636001°E

General information
- Type: Street
- Location: Melbourne
- Length: 100 m (300 ft)
- Gazetted: 1837
- Tourist routes: City of Melbourne Walks: Arcades & Lanes, The Cosmopolitan

Major junctions
- North end: Flinders Lane
- South end: Flinders Street

Location(s)
- LGA(s): City of Melbourne

Degraves Street is a pedestrian precinct and thoroughfare in the Melbourne central business district in Victoria, Australia. It is a short, narrow laneway that runs north–south from Flinders Street to Flinders Lane and is situated in-between Swanston and Elizabeth streets. Degraves, as the street is colloquially known, is famous for its alfresco dining options and because it epitomises Melbourne's coffee culture and street art scene. For these reasons it has also become a popular tourist destination.

The street is named after Charles and William Degraves, pioneer merchants from Hobart who built a flour mill at the corner of Flinders Lane and Degraves Street in 1849. William was also notably a member of the Victorian Legislative Council for fourteen years.

== Location ==
The cobbled bluestone alley forms a busy alternative thoroughfare for commuters disembarking from Flinders Street station toward the shopping areas of Block Arcade on Collins Street and Bourke Street Mall.

Degraves Street is often confused and therefore synonymous with Centre Place, a similar walkway situated diagonally on the other side of Flinders Lane. Degraves Street also offshoots to the east into a dead end (sharing the same name) about halfway down its length.

Campbell Arcade (also referred to as the Degraves Underpass) was built in the 1950s to allow pedestrians to walk from Flinders Street Station to Degraves Street underground, rather than walking across busy Flinders Street. It is used by thousands of people every day. The arcade is home to the Platform Artists Group who frequently exhibit artworks amongst the arcade's iconic pink tiles and black marble columns.

== Culture ==
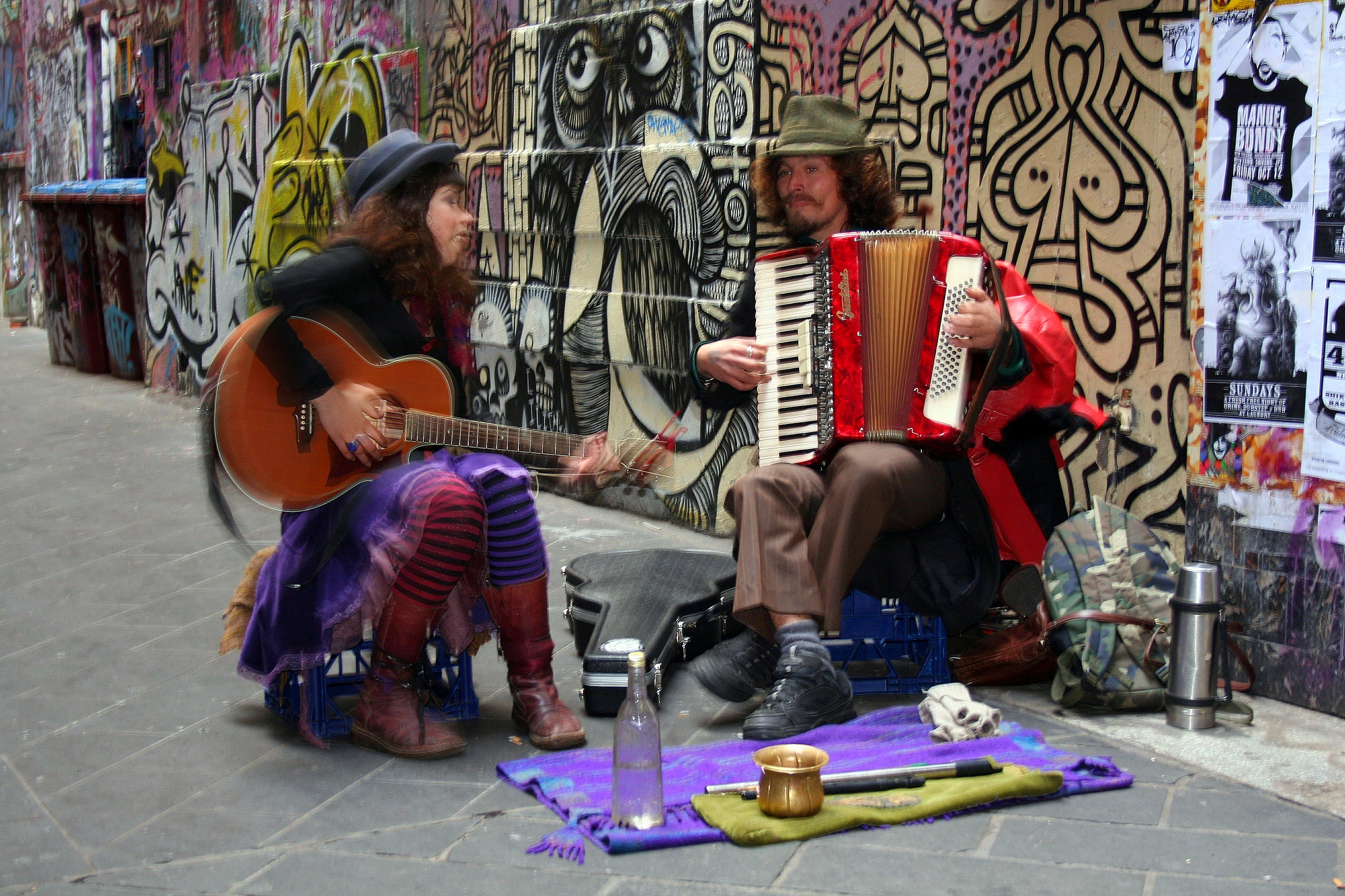
Buskers performing on Degraves Street

Degraves features numerous bars, shops, cafes and restaurants. The art deco architecture, dining umbrellas and café canopies mean the street is often described as having a Parisian or European flavour. Redevelopment of the Mutual Store in 2006 has further enhanced the lane with additional shops.

Many of the taller, older buildings were also converted into loft style apartments in the 1990s, adding further life to the area. Street art and graffiti are commonplace, whilst buskers/street performers also frequent the laneway, adding to its atmosphere.

The Majorca Building, built in the 1930s, dominates the view at the northern end of Degraves Street. The building was designed by Harry Norris and is cladded in faience tiles.

Degraves Street is also the location which many Silent Disco's pass through.

== Gallery ==
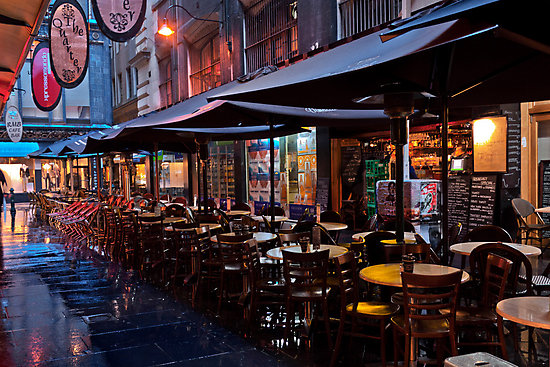
Degraves Street at dusk

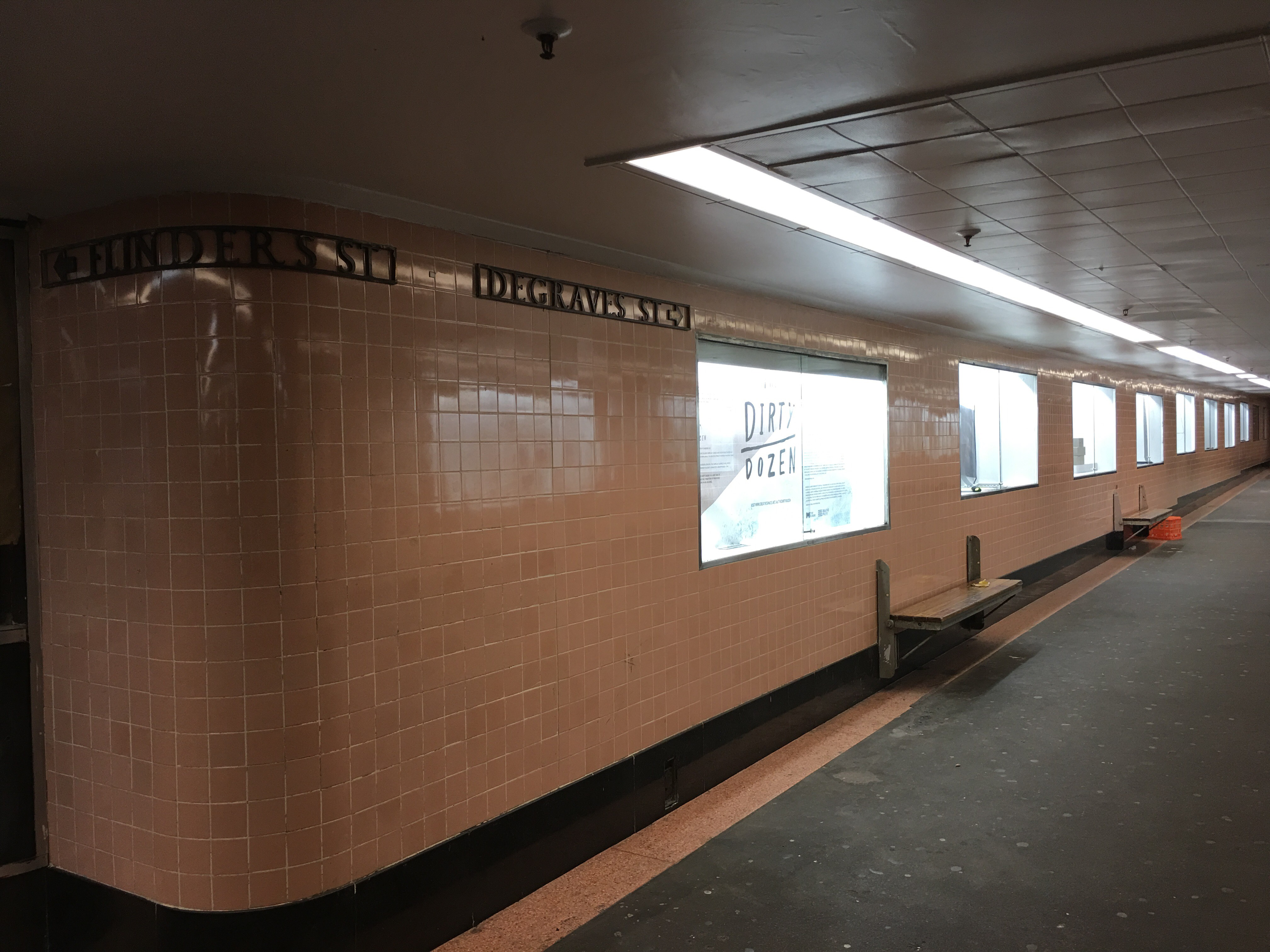
Campbell Arcade underpass from Flinders Street station with signature pink tiles

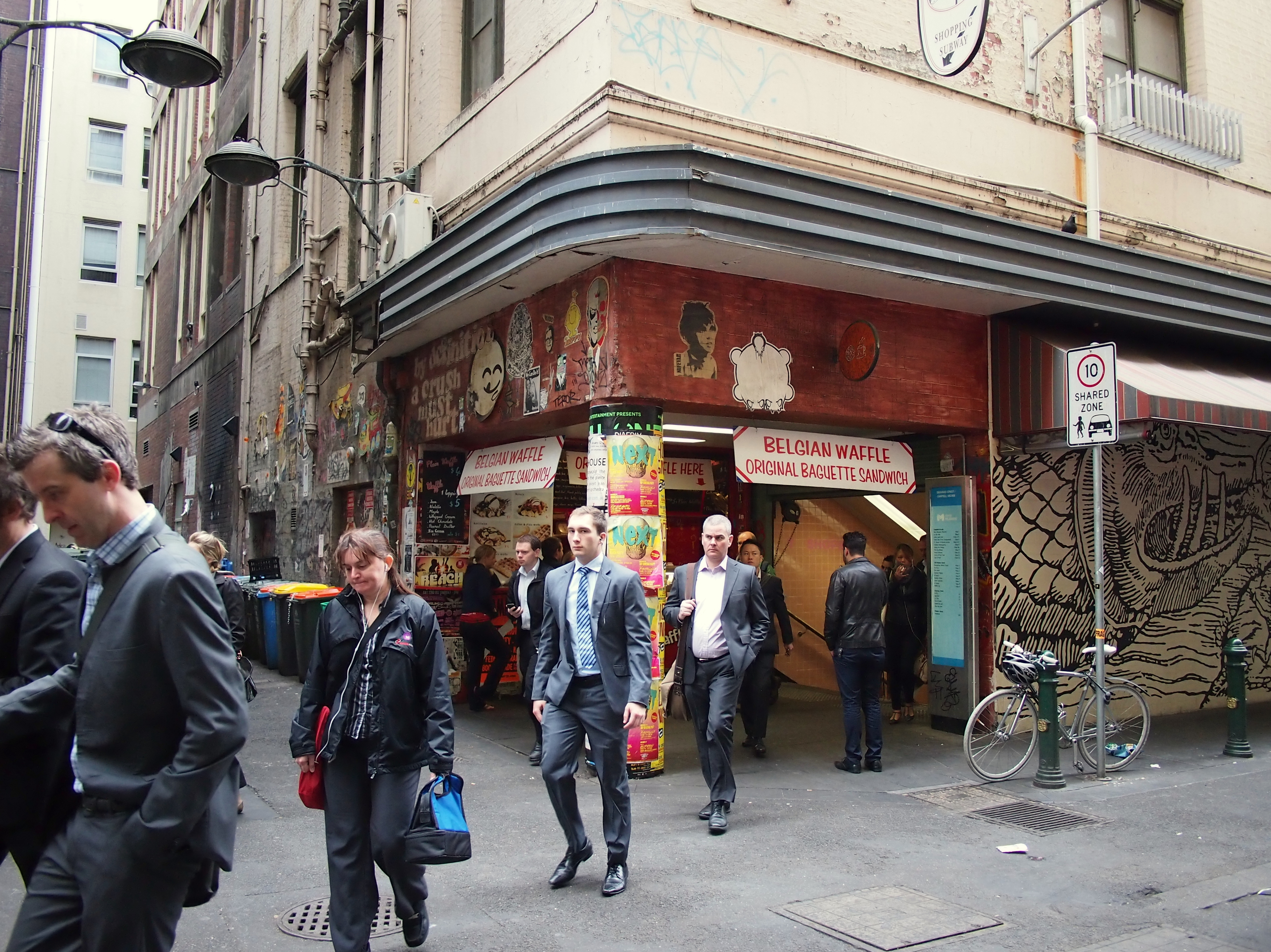
Degraves Street exit from Campbell Arcade

== See also ==
- Lanes and arcades of Melbourne
- History of Melbourne
- Melbourne Walks
