= Alkira House =

Art Deco office building in Melbourne, Australia

Coordinates: 37.818268°S 144.962660°E

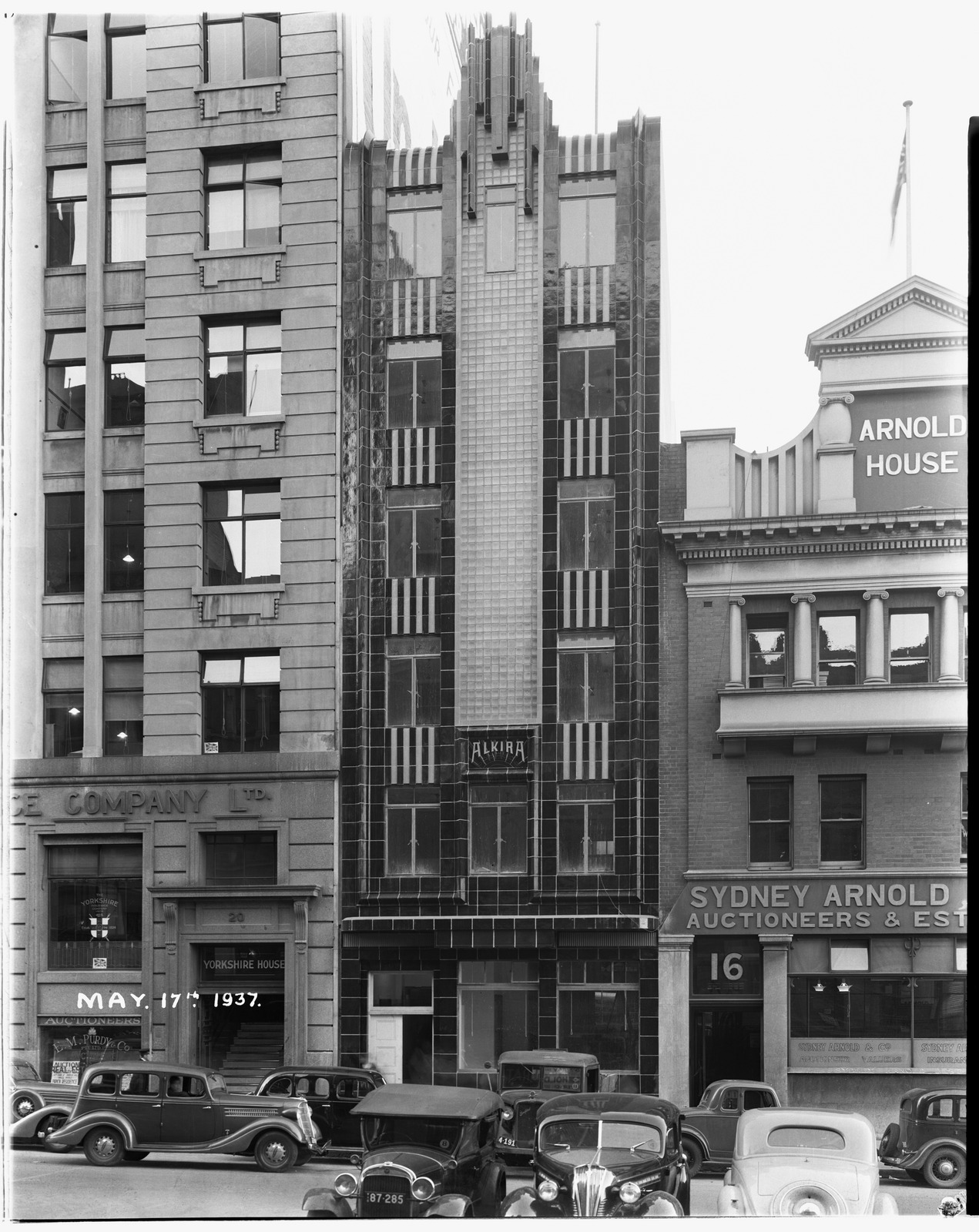
- Alkira House in 1937
- Interactive map of the Alkira House area
- Former names: United Oil Building

General information
- Architectural style: Art Deco, Moderne
- Location: Melbourne CBD, 18 Queen Street
- Year built: 1937

Design and construction
- Architect: James Wardrop

Alkira House is a heritage listed office building in Melbourne's CBD. Designed in 1937 by architect James Wardrop, it is a notable example of the Jazz Moderne architecture in Victoria, as well as being the first use of external glass brick brick in Australia.

== Architecture ==
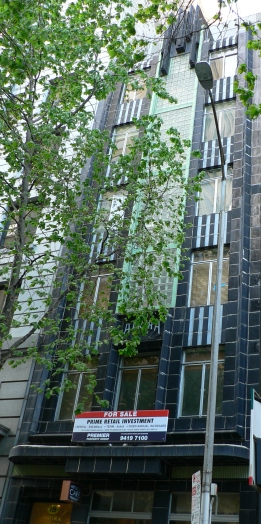
Alkira House in 2006, with the green terracotta visible

Alkira House is a six-storey office reinforced concrete office building designed by James Wardrop who was also one of the architects responsible for designing the Shrine of Remembrance. The building reflects modern office building philosophy, especially the Dutch and German experiments in glass, vitrolite, and terracotta of the 1920s and 1930s. The facade is clad with green terracotta tiles and has a large vertical panel that ends from the second to the sixth floors of the building, constructed from glass brick, to illuminate the building. It was the first time glass bricks were used externally in Australia.

It is a rare example of an inter-war Jazz Moderne building, like the United Kingdom Hotel which was designed by Wardrop two years after.

== History ==
Before Alkira House was built, a three-storey stone store and then a two-storey office existed on the site at 18 Queen Street. The current structure was built in 1937 as an investment for the owners Annie and Harold Cohen. The builders were Swanson Bros.
