= Campbell Arcade =

Shopping arcade in Melbourne, Victoria

Campbell Arcade Victoria
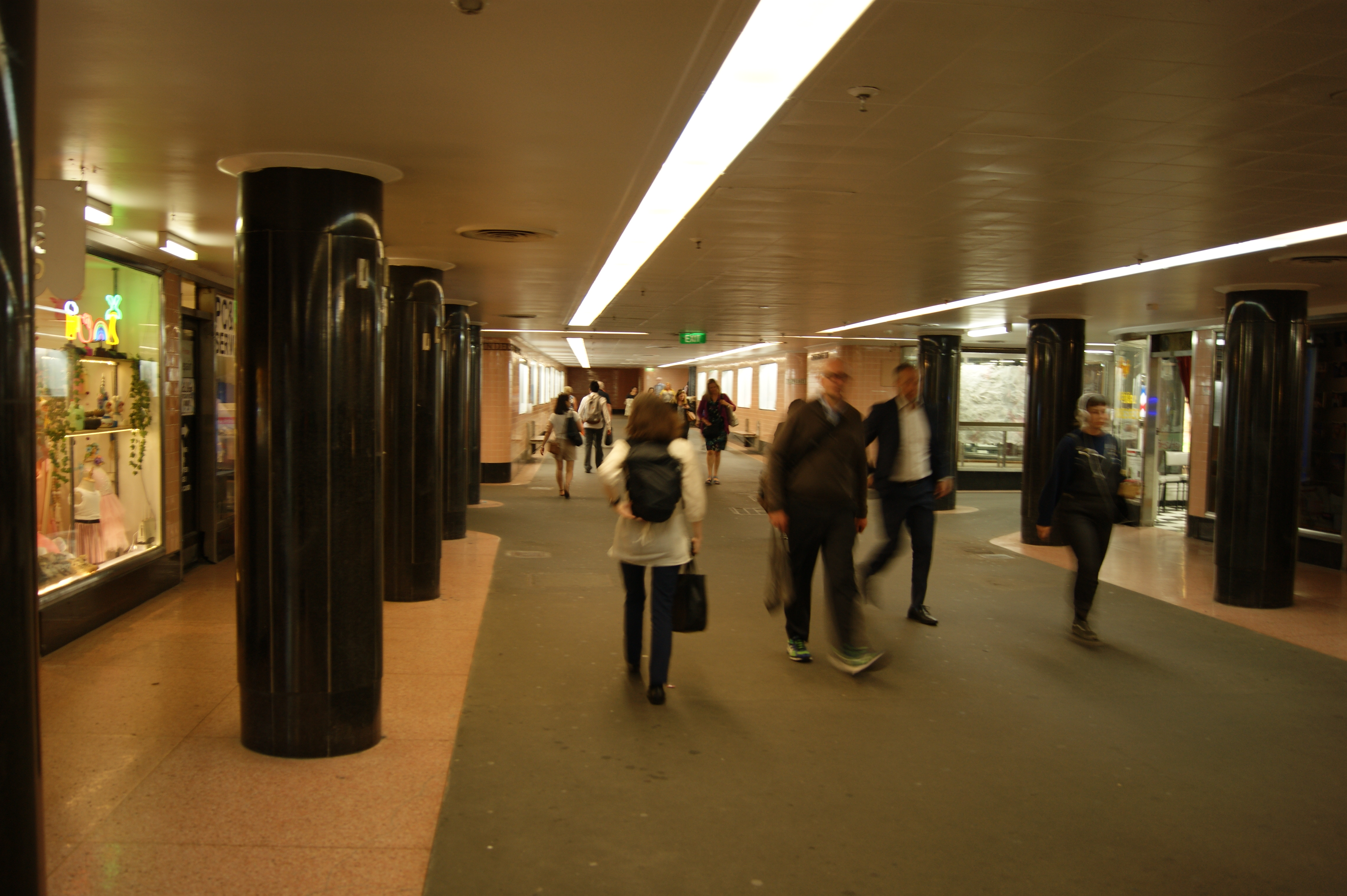

General information
- Type: Street
- Opened: 1955

Major junctions
- North end: Degraves Street
- Flinders Street
- South end: Flinders Street railway station

Campbell Arcade is an underground pedestrian shopping arcade located in Melbourne, Victoria, Australia. The arcade is accessible from Flinders Street station and was built in 1955 to ensure crossing between Flinders Street and Melbourne's main train station was safer. It was completed ahead of the 1956 Melbourne Olympics.

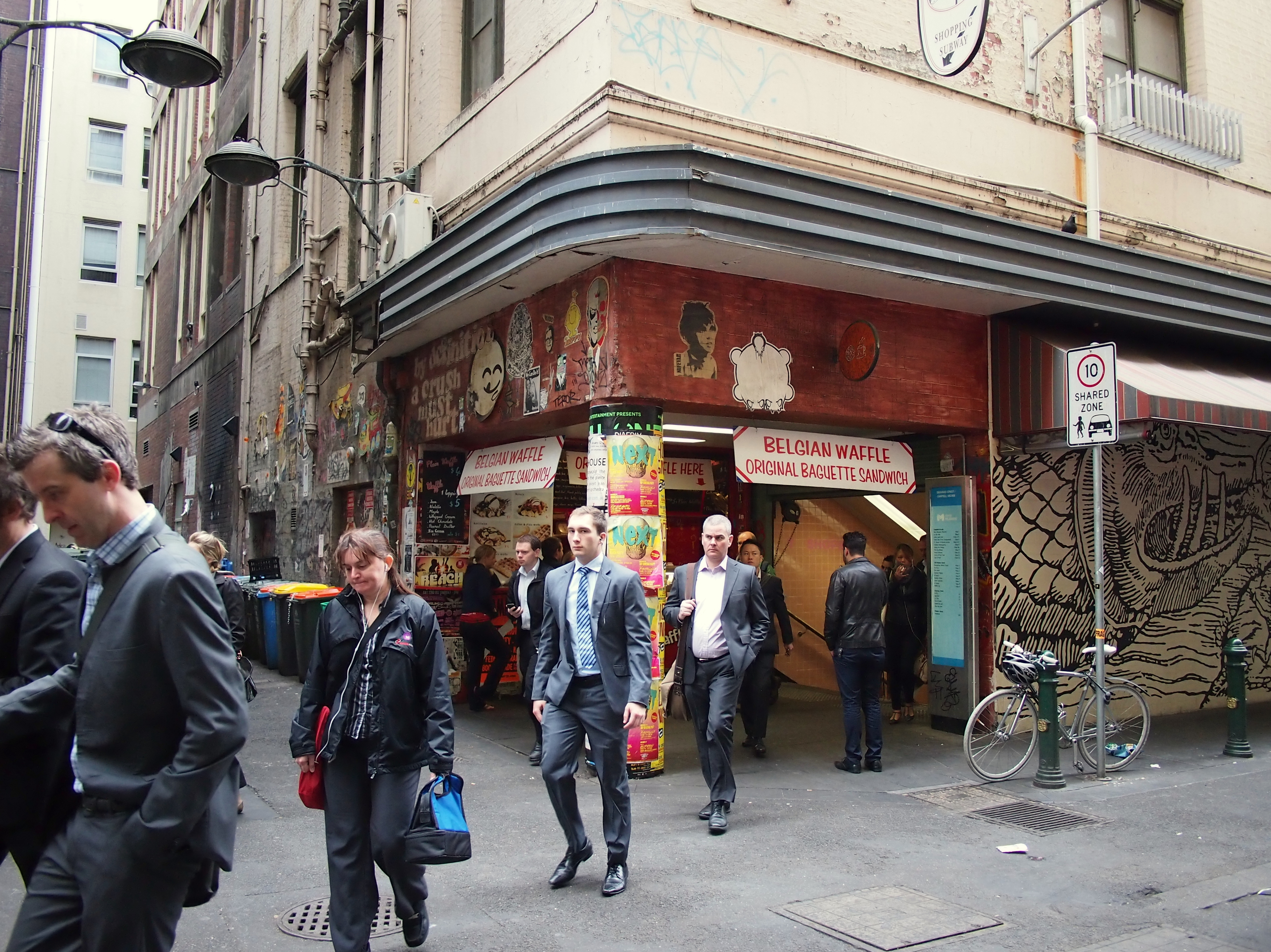
Campbell Arcade exit on Degraves Street

Campbell Arcade also connects to two staircases leading to the northern and southern sides of Flinders Street. The arcade's salmon pink tiles, black marble pillars and art deco shopfronts are its original decor. Tramlines also run directly above the arcade.

Campbell Arcade is listed under the City of Melbourne and on the Victorian Heritage Register, under the listing for Flinders Street station (H1083). The Arcade itself was specifically added to the listing in 2015, "recognising its architectural qualities and historical significance", as the "first infrastructure to be built in the city following World War II" and as the centre of the city's suburban commuter railway system.

Since construction it has always been a shopping arcade. Before the City Loop distributed passengers to Melbourne's other train stations the arcade was far busier, though around 70,000 commuters still pass through of a morning. The pedestrian thoroughfare includes a bar, a coffee shop, hairdressers and a record store. Between 1994 and 2015 artworks were also displayed by the resident Platform Artists Group. This has since been taken over by The Dirty Dozen, an initiative of City of Melbourne's Creative Spaces.

Campbell Arcade was closed for renovations between April 2022 and July 2025 due to the construction of Town Hall station, as part of the Metro Tunnel project. The arcade now serves as an interchange and walkway between Flinders Street and Town Hall stations.

== See also ==
- Lanes and arcades of Melbourne
- Melbourne City Centre
