= Architecture of Melbourne =

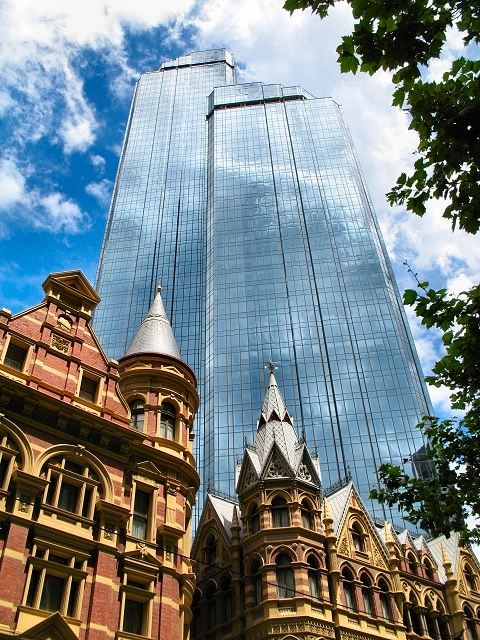
Victorian era Rialto group of buildings contrasted with the 20th Century late modernist Rialto.

The architecture of Melbourne, Victoria, Australia, is characterised by a wide variety of styles. The city is particularly noted for its mix of Victorian-era architecture and contemporary buildings, with 79 skyscrapers (buildings 150 metres (490 ft) or taller) completed or topped-out, the most of any city in Australia.

== Overview ==
In the wake of the 1850s Victoria gold rush, Melbourne entered a lengthy boom period that culminated in the real-estate bubble of the 1880s and early 1890s. This saw the construction of a large amount of ornate, High Victorian Boom style buildings in the city centre. Melbourne's skyline subsequently transformed, becoming the first early skyscraper city outside the United States; architectural historian Miles Lewis described Melbourne of the period as a "Queen Anne Chicago". Melbourne at this time was also second only to London as the largest and wealthiest city in the British Empire, and earned the still-quoted moniker "Marvellous Melbourne", coined by English journalist George Augustus Sala while visiting in 1885. The affluence of the period is reflected in many surviving buildings, including the Royal Exhibition Building, Australia's first UNESCO World Heritage-listed building. Beyond the city centre, suburbs arose and became peppered with mansions, villas and terraces with iron lace verandahs, and many suburbs developed bustling main streets, leaving a substantial architectural legacy.

Following a financial collapse in the early 1890s, Melbourne's growth returned by the early 20th century, and continued at a more modest pace in the following decades. The Federation period of 1900–1915 saw a new crop of commercial buildings in the city centre; concerns about the likely congestion caused by skyscraper development and the influence of the City Beautiful movement saw a 40-metre (132 ft) height limit introduced in 1916 (which still allowed for ornamental towers). Suburban development of detached houses continued, in the new red brick Federation style. After the restrictions of World War I, development again resumed, with American influences now evident, such as Stripped Classical office buildings, and Californian Bungalow houses. After the interruption of the Great Depression, development again resumed about 1933, with central city commercial buildings now in the Art Deco style, and suburban development in a range of revivals, such as Spanish Mission or Old English. The development of low-rise flats in inner and middle suburban areas, which began just before World War I, continued in the 1920s in various revival styles, and increased markedly in the 1930s, usually in Art Deco style, a small boom which was abruptly terminated by World War II in 1940.

The post-World War II period ushered in a new boom, and the city hosted the Summer Olympics in 1956, and the lifting of height limits at the same time led to a boom in high-rise office building, beginning with ICI House, completed in 1958. This boom resulted in the loss of many of the city's Victorian-era buildings, which were replaced by modernist structures. Concern at the losses led to the passage of the Historic Buildings Act, 1974 (VIC) and the establishment of the Historic Buildings Register, known as the Victorian Heritage Register following the passage of the Heritage Act, 1995 (VIC) and later the Heritage Act, 2017 (VIC), and the heritage list now includes many notable landmarks.

Since the 2000s, the central city and neighbouring Southbank and Melbourne Docklands urban renewal areas have been the subject of a residential revival which has seen a new boom in high rise construction. Some blocks of the city are now developed to very high densities, and include the tallest buildings in Australia, including the 297m (92 floors) Eureka Tower, which was the tallest residential tower in the world when completed in 2006, and its spiritual successor Australia 108. The city has also added some notable architectural landmarks including Southern Cross Station and Federation Square.

Distinctively Melbourne styles include the many bluestone (basalt) constructions of the early colonial and gold rush era, extensive use of polychrome brickwork and a regional variation of the boom-style Victorian Italianate Filigree (decorative cast iron) terrace houses featuring excessively high and ornamented parapets from the High Victorian period and a residential style pioneered by Robin Boyd and Roy Grounds known as the post-war Melbourne regional style. These attributes are rare elsewhere.

== History ==
Cooks' Cottage, built in 1755, is the former home of British explorer James Cook. The house was transplanted in 1934 from the English village of Great Ayton, North Yorkshire by the Australian philanthropist Sir Russell Grimwade to Melbourne, making it the oldest extant building in Australia.

=== 1835–1850: Earliest buildings ===
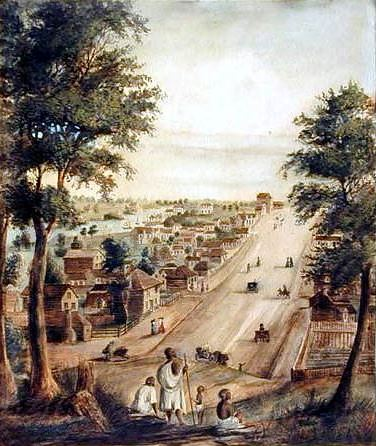
Illustration of Collins Street in 1839 overlooked by Wurundjeri from the hill on the approximate site of the Old Treasury.

The original inhabitants, the Wurundjeri were known to have created temporary structures called Mia-mia out of bark, saplings and timber and were observed by Protector of Aborigines William Thomas to be comfortably housed.

Melbourne was settled by Europeans in 1835, when rival entrepreneurs from Tasmania, John Batman and John Pascoe Fawkner, sent expeditions looking for sheep pasture. Batman famously stated that “This is the place for a village”, generally believed to refer to the point on the Yarra River where freshwater was found (near today's Queensbridge). However Batman's Treaty was declared void by the government of the time so what was later known as the Port Phillip District was established as a squatter's encampment. The land to the north of the Yarra was a gentle valley between hills to the east and west, and riding ground to the north. Nevertheless, in 1837, government surveyor Robert Hoddle laid out a grid of streets, approximately thirty metres (ninety-eight feet) wide (considerably wider than Sydney streets) between the two hills and aligned with the river.

Early buildings were modest and typical of a frontier town, and there were few landmarks of note. From early accounts and sketches there were few if any buildings taller than two storeys. Many were of timber construction and those of brick and stone. Almost all were built in the prominent colonial architectural style of the time, the Georgian revival. Most were detached or semi-detached buildings with gable or hip rooves and simple undecorated walls. Melbourne was early to expand and spread from the Hoddle grid along the Yarra and Maribyrnong River and Port Phillip Bay. Early buildings that survived later development are located in suburbs such as East Melbourne, Fitzroy, Hawthorn, Williamstown, St Kilda and Heidelberg among others.

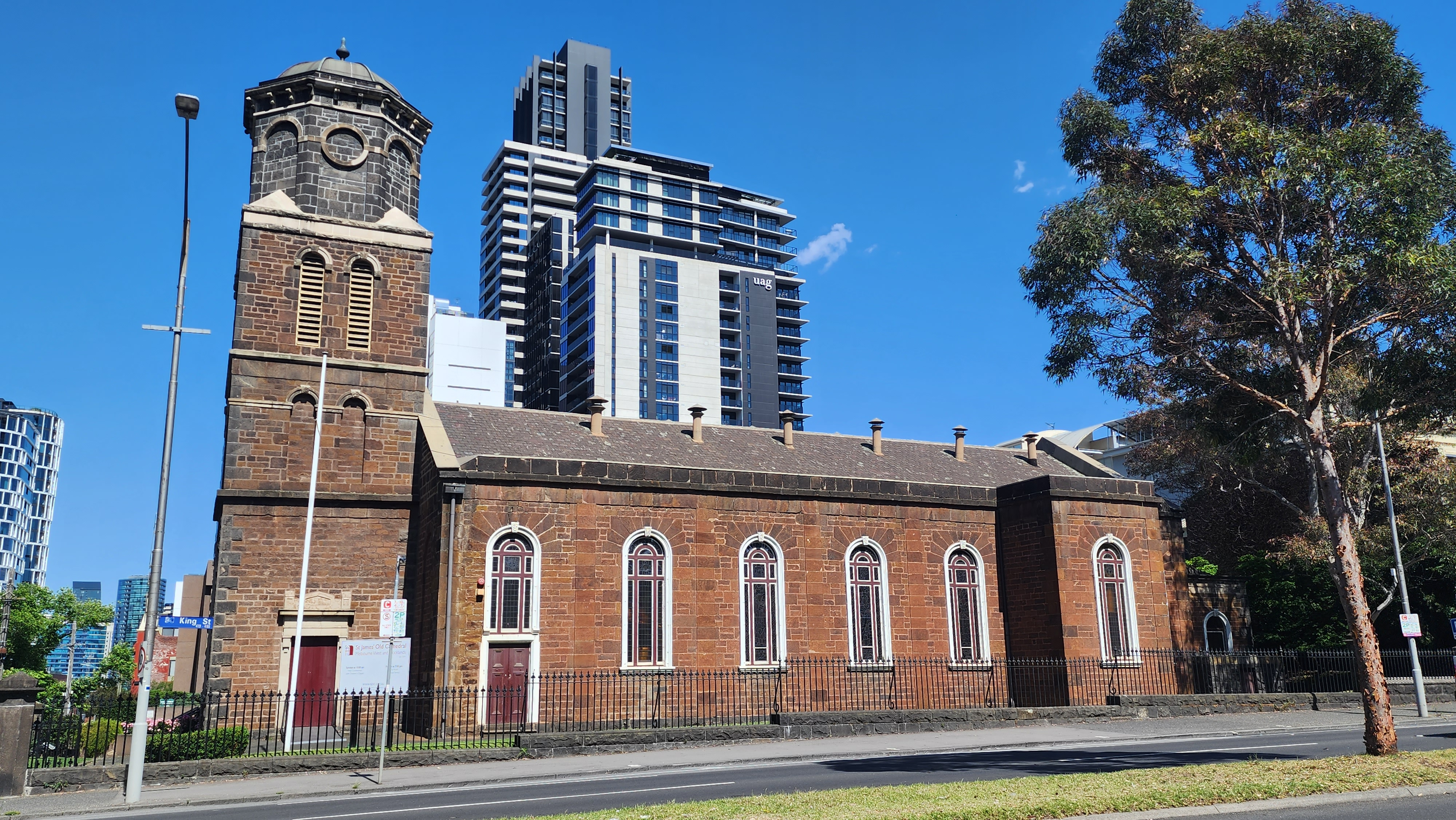
St James' Old Cathedral (1839-1847) (relocated 1914), the most prominent of the few remaining buildings from the colonial era.

A well-known surviving building from this period is the St James' Old Cathedral (1839–1847), which originally stood at the corner of William and Little Collins streets in what was then the centre of town but was later relocated.

Another of Melbourne's oldest buildings La Trobe's Cottage (1839) was a prefabricated home constructed in England and transported to Melbourne. Like St James', it was relocated, though several times prior to its current site in the Kings Domain.

Other English styles, including English Gothic, Jacobean Revival and Tudor Revival were also evident in some early buildings. Part of St Francis' Church on the corner of Lonsdale and Elizabeth streets dates from 1842, the simple construction is Melbourne's oldest Gothic Revival building, though its original form was later significantly augmented and altered. The Hawthorns, Hawthorn (1845), St Peter's Church, Eastern Hill (1846), Invergowie in Hawthorn (1846), Wattle House in St Kilda (1846), as well as Banyule (1846) and St John's Anglican Church (1849) in Heidelberg, Overnewton in Keilor (1849–1859) and Whitbyfield in Brunswick (c. 1850) are other examples of early Tudor revival.

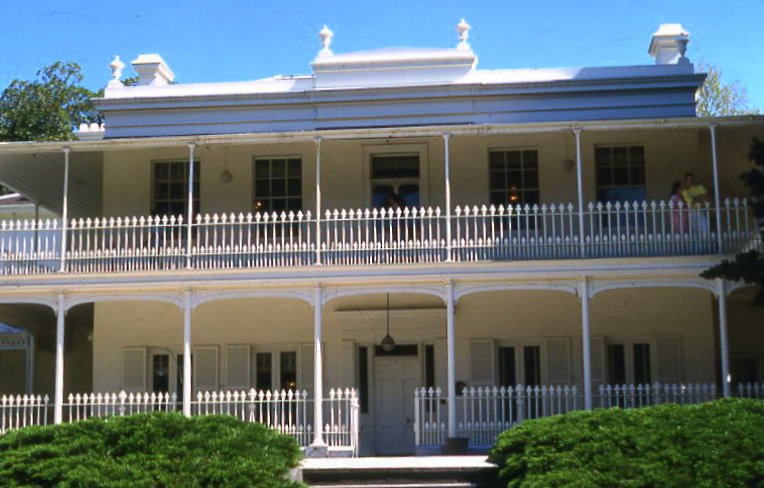
Como House in South Yarra (built 1847 and extended in 1853), operated as a museum by the National Trust of Victoria, is the city's best preserved example of residential colonial architecture.

Early suburban architecture exhibited a variety of different styles. For example, Charterisville in Ivanhoe (1840) is a sandstone residence with a strong association with the artists colony at Heidelberg; Wentworth House in Pascoe Vale (1842–1852) is one of Melbourne's earliest bluestone houses; Como House in South Yarra (1847) is considered one of the finest colonial era regency style homes in Victoria; Toorak House (1849) after which Toorak was named is a significant pre-gold rush Italianate mansion considered the finest in the colony; and, Manor House in Broadmeadows (1850) is a combination of Scottish residential style in bluestone.

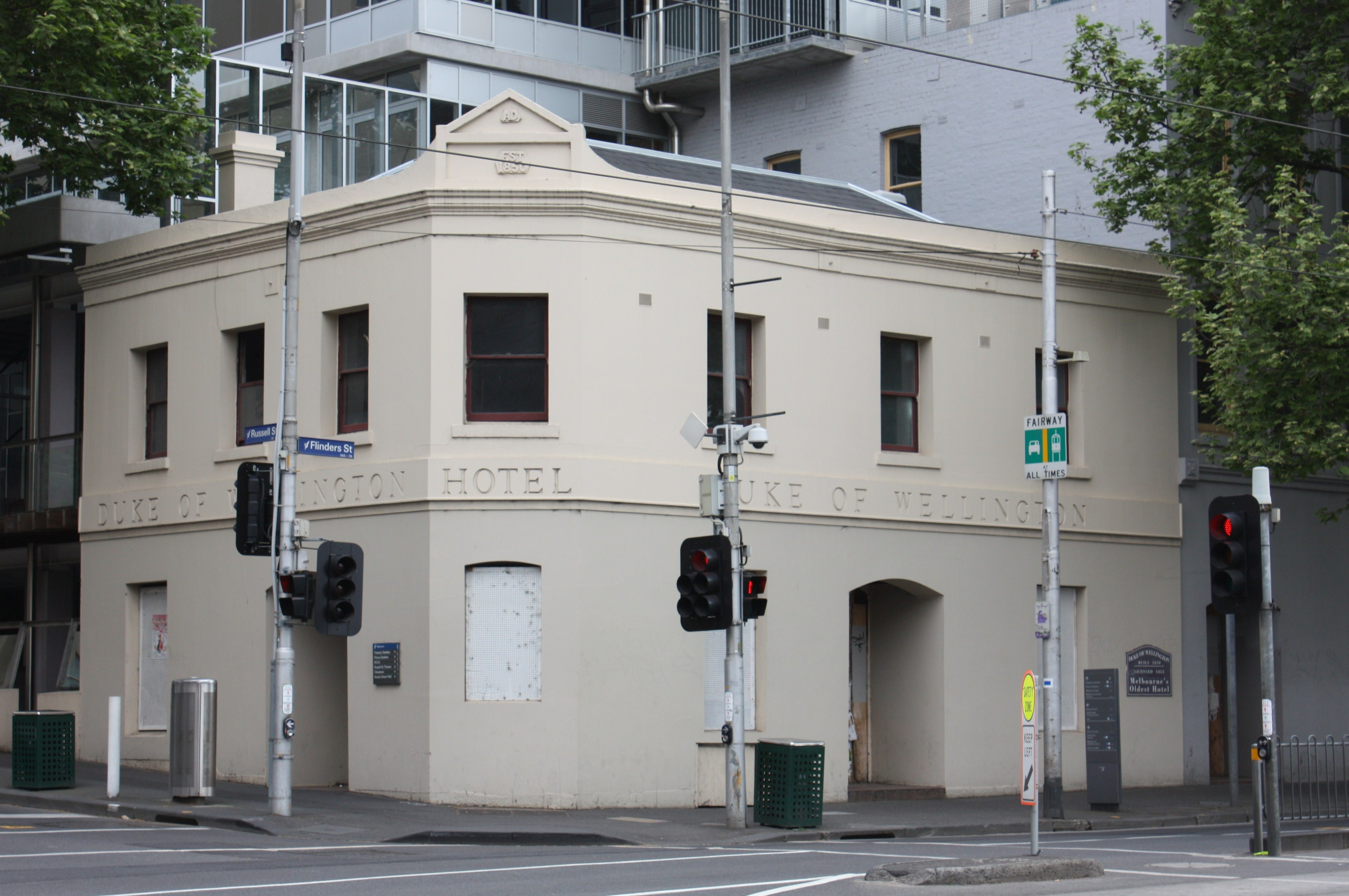
Duke of Wellington Hotel on Flinders Street. Dating to 1850 it is one of the city's oldest surviving commercial buildings.

Devonshire Arms Hotel in Fitzroy (1843) a modest Georgian style building is the oldest extant hotel in the city. Job Warehouse (54-62 Bourke Street) (1848–1849), a double storey building in the Georgian style is the oldest surviving row and typical of the era, though slightly modified. Oddfellows Hotel (1848–1850) is another early example. The John Smith Residence (1848–1852) is the oldest surviving residence built in the Hoddle Grid, though the Georgian style home later had an additional storey added. A two-storey colonial regency style shop on the corner of King and Latrobe Street (1850) is recognised as the oldest known building in the Hoddle Grid with an unmodified original appearance. The Duke of Wellington Hotel on Flinders Street (1850), another modest two-storey Georgian style building, is also believed to date to this era and is cited as the oldest public bar in the Hoddle Grid. Another building known as the Black Eagle Hotel was built in 1850 as two-storey Georgian terraces in Little Lonsdale street may have operated as a hotel from the outset. By the 1850s the city centre's early subdivisions began to fill in and consisted of fragmented rows of attached buildings, most a couple of storeys high serviced by rear laneways, a plan which helped dictate the form of many buildings in the subsequent decades.

Named the capital of the new Colony of Victoria on 1 July 1851 Melbourne even prior to the discovery of gold it was a successful settlement. Having grown mostly due to rich Victorian pastures it had operated as a busy port since 1841 and had a population of approximately 23,000. Despite being the youngest of the colonial capitals, it had overtaken all but Sydney.

=== 1851–1880: Gold Rush era ===
Following this early settlement period, just after the Colony of Victoria was separated from the Colony of New South Wales in 1851, gold was discovered, and thousands of people flocked to the city from the United Kingdom, as well as Europe and the United States, to seek their fortune on the Victorian goldfields. Within a year Melbourne had overtaken Sydney as Australia's most populous settlement. As a result of the Gold Rush, Melbourne's population grew from 4,000 in 1837 to 300,000 in 1854. Approximately £100 million worth of gold was discovered in the Victorian fields in the 1850s. The gold rush was followed by a growth in pastoral wealth, the development of local industries, railways, suburbs, shops, and ports. The immense wealth generated during this period helped fund the construction of many large public buildings during this period including the State Library, Parliament House, the Town Hall, Old Treasury, Law courts, General Post Office and Royal Exhibition Building. They also include two of celebrated Victorian architect William Wardell's works: St Patrick's Cathedral and Government House.

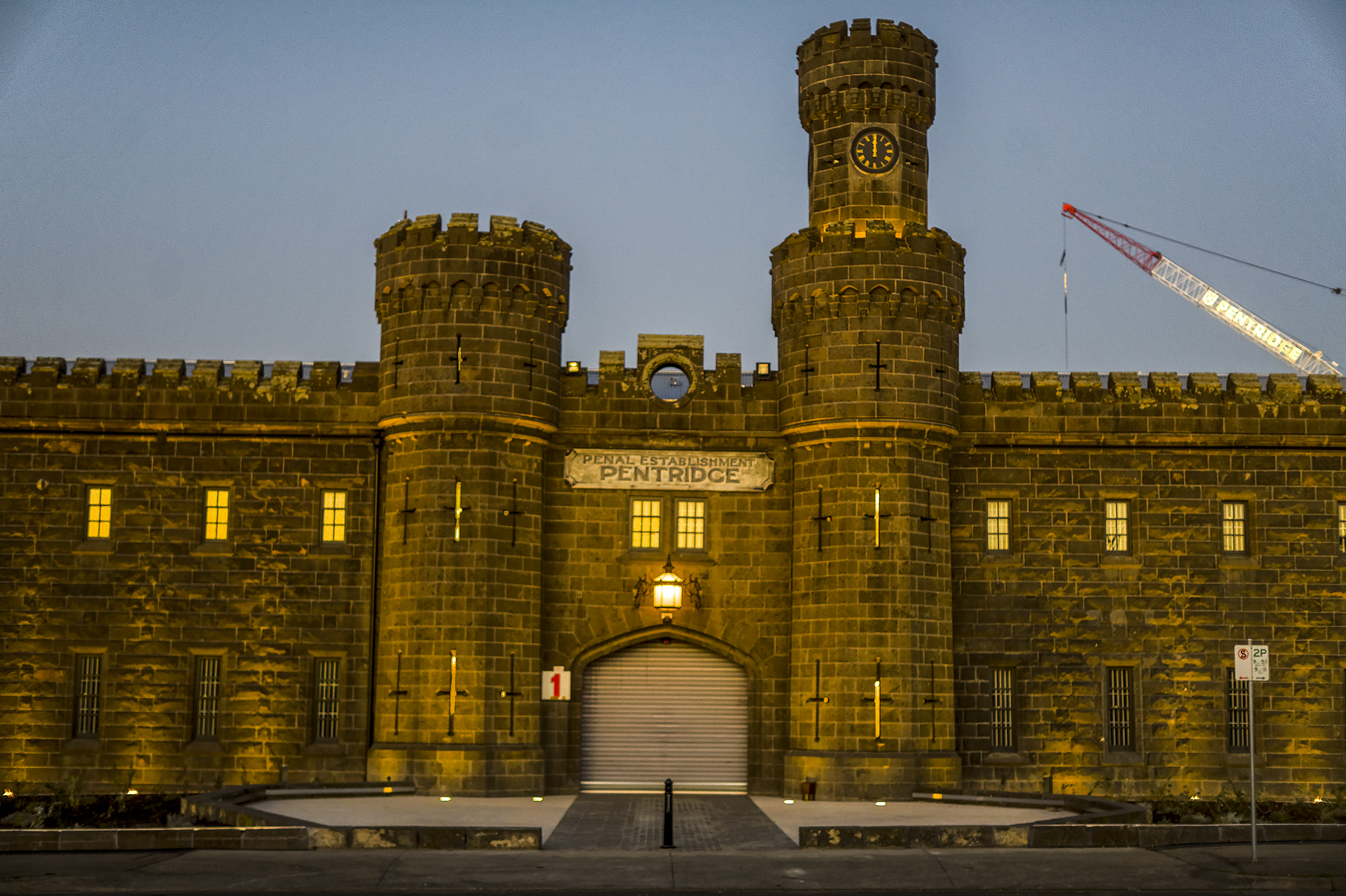
HM Prison Pentridge built in 1851 to address the explosion of crime from the early gold rush, is one of the most distinctive and intact of Melbourne's large bluestone buildings.

Locally quarried bluestone (basalt) was a distinctive construction material used from Melbourne's earliest days however it became increasingly popular during the gold rush for institutional buildings due to its heavy rusticated effect and its stern, foreboding appearance. As such it was used extensively in buildings for enforcement, the military and warehousing most commonly in combination with Renaissance Italianate or ecclesiastical and educational institution buildings where it was often combined with a gothic revival style. HM Prison Pentridge (1851) is particularly notable as one of the largest gold rush era bluestone buildings as well as for its distinctive castellated Tudor appearance incorporating medieval style watch towers, arrow slits and panopticons. Other primarily bluestone buildings include the remaining wings of the Old Melbourne Gaol (1852–1854), Williamstown Timeball Tower (1852), Mac's Hotel (1853), St Peter's Church, Eastern Hill transepts (1846–1876), Victoria Barracks (1856–1872), Melbourne Church Of England Grammar (1856), St Andrew's Church, Brighton (1857), Wesleyan Methodist Church St Kilda (1857–1858) Wesley Church complex (1858–1859) All Saints St Kilda (1858–1882), St Patrick's Cathedral (1858–1939), Seabrook House (1858), St Mary's Church of England in North Melbourne (1858–1860), St Mary's Dandenong Road (1859–1871), St John's Toorak (1860–1873) Goldsborough Mort & Co Ltd warehouse (1861–1862), Victorian College for the Deaf (1866), Victorian College for the Blind (1868), St Ignatius Richmond (1867–1870), Cathedral College, East Melbourne (1869–1870), St Augustine's Church and School (1869–1929), and Williamstown Primary School (1878). Bluestone continued to be used in Melbourne with prominent later examples including the facade of the Carlton & United Brewery (1858–1883). Residential examples while rare, are notable, particularly Bishopscourt (1852); Royal Terrace Fitzroy (1853–1858); 115–117 Grey Street, East Melbourne (1854); 35 Hanover Street, Fitzroy (1855); Gowrie, Glenroy; D'Estaville Kew (1859); Joseph Reed's design of 157 Hotham Street East Melbourne (1861); Crouch and Wilson's design for 12 Jolimont Terrace East Melbourne (1868); G A Badger's design for 'The Opera House' at 138 Powlett Street East Melbourne; and Eynesbury Homestead at Eynesbury (1872–75). The material however proved difficult to shape to finer classical details so in many other city buildings it was instead used as foundation material due to its robust and porous property.

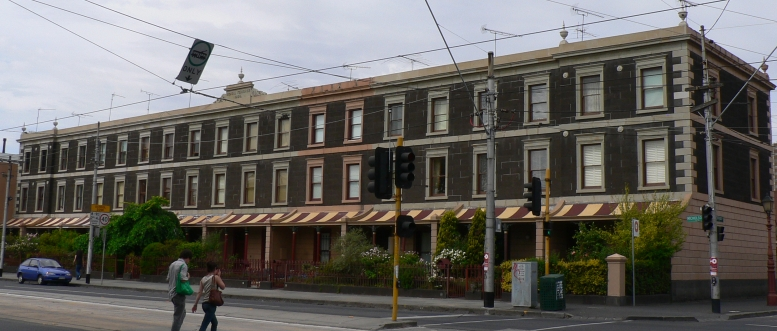
The bluestone Royal Terrace (1853–1854) was the first large example of newly popularised terraced housing.

Terrace house developments also grew in importance, especially to house the new middle class and attached housing, including shop houses, became the dominant form. Early modes were inspired by the colonial Georgian, regency and Renaissance Revival. The most notable early example is Royal Terrace (1853–1854), a large triple storey bluestone row on Nicholson Street in the early residential suburb of Fitzroy, designed to face the reserve that would become Carlton Gardens. Royal Terrace differs from Melbourne's later terraces in its ornamental restraint and long horizontal string courses give the impression of a single continuous row with party walls expressed only at ground level. The demand for more distinguished homes led to the popularity of stucco rendering to simulate stone details. Examples of this new form are evident in Glass Terrace in Fitzroy (1854–1856), along with Clarendon Terrace (1857), Nepean Terrace (1864), and Cyprus Terrace (1867) in East Melbourne. The terrace begin to evolve into the distinctive Melbourne style consisting of high Italianate parapets to hide the roofline and rich cast iron ornament. Early predecessors include Cobden Terrace in Fitzroy (1869–1875), Rochester Terrace in Albert Park (1869–1879) part of the English style square design of St Vincent Place, and Tasma Terrace in East Melbourne (1878) by Charles Webb considered one of the finest three storey terraces in Australia.

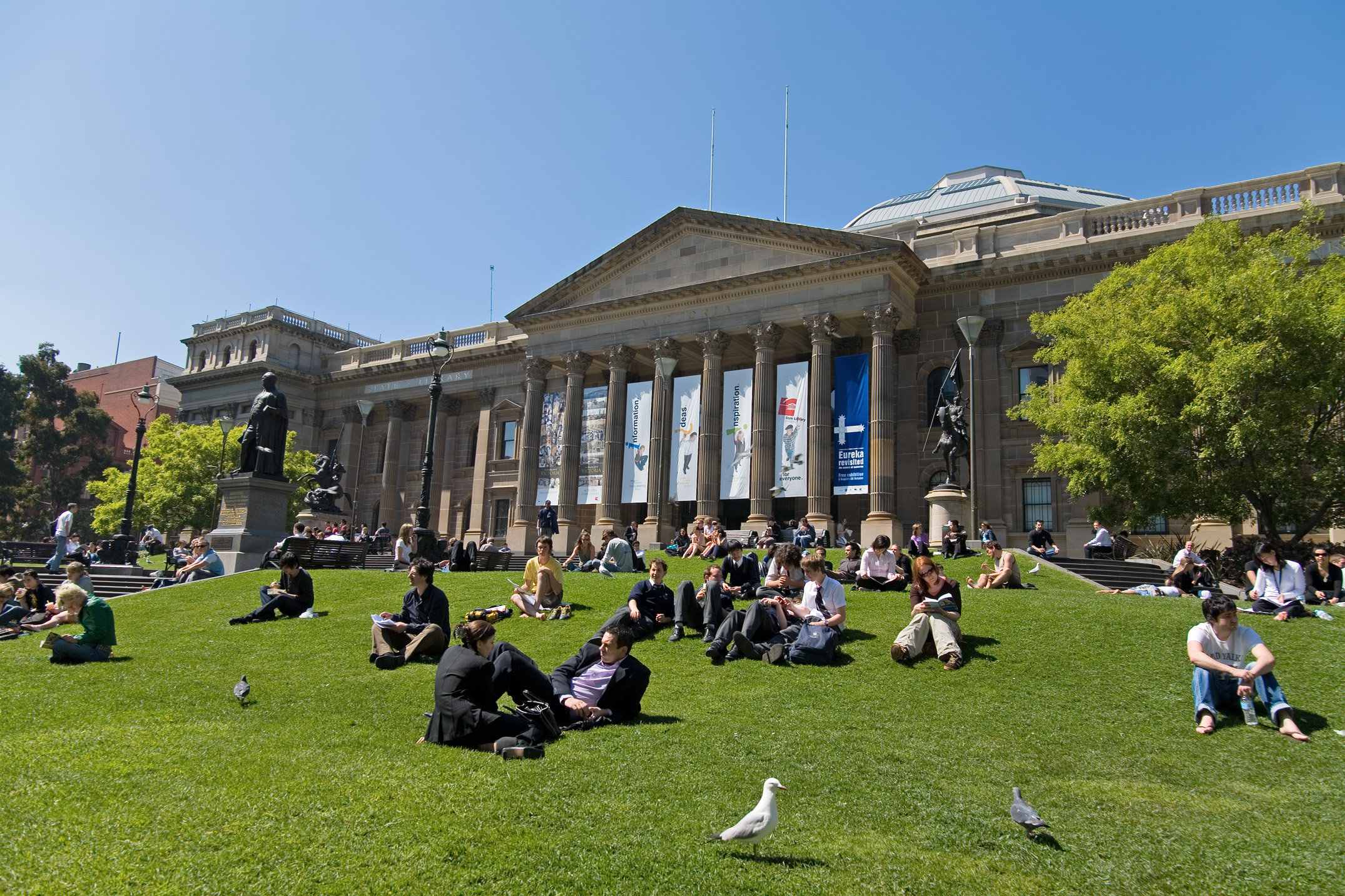
Joseph Reed's 1854 competition winning entry for the State Library of Victoria contributed to the strong academic classical theme in the city's early public buildings.

Academic classicism was favoured for large institutions and its execution required more versatile materials with the popularity of stone and stucco features producing more elaborate but stately designs. Prolific Melbourne architect Joseph Reed's contributions include the State Library (1854-1870), Collins Street Baptist Church (1854), facade of the Bank of New South Wales (1856–1857), Royal Society of Victoria building (1859) and Melbourne Town Hall (1869). Other significant examples include: Parliament House (1855–), Victorian Trades Hall (1859) and Supreme Court Library (1874–1884). Giant order columns or pilasters along with other classical details including pediments, porticos, vaulted ceilings and entry stairs were common elements of their design. Design of large public buildings was ambitious due to the speculative nature of the gold rush. Many of the larger designs featured prominent domes, though their construction relied on future funds which would not be forthcoming. The Supreme Court Library dome, modeled on the Four Courts in Dublin is one of few original designs which was completed. Joseph Reed's original design for the State Library called for a Museum and Gallery topped by a massive neoclassical dome. Only sections of both buildings were completed and the current building features a different design completed in later decades. Peter Kerr's 78 metre high dome design for the Parliament houses were also never constructed. These features were often still illustrated in depictions of the city from the period due to the confidence that they would eventually be completed. Despite its many missing features Parliament remains one of the most impressive neoclassical structures in the city.

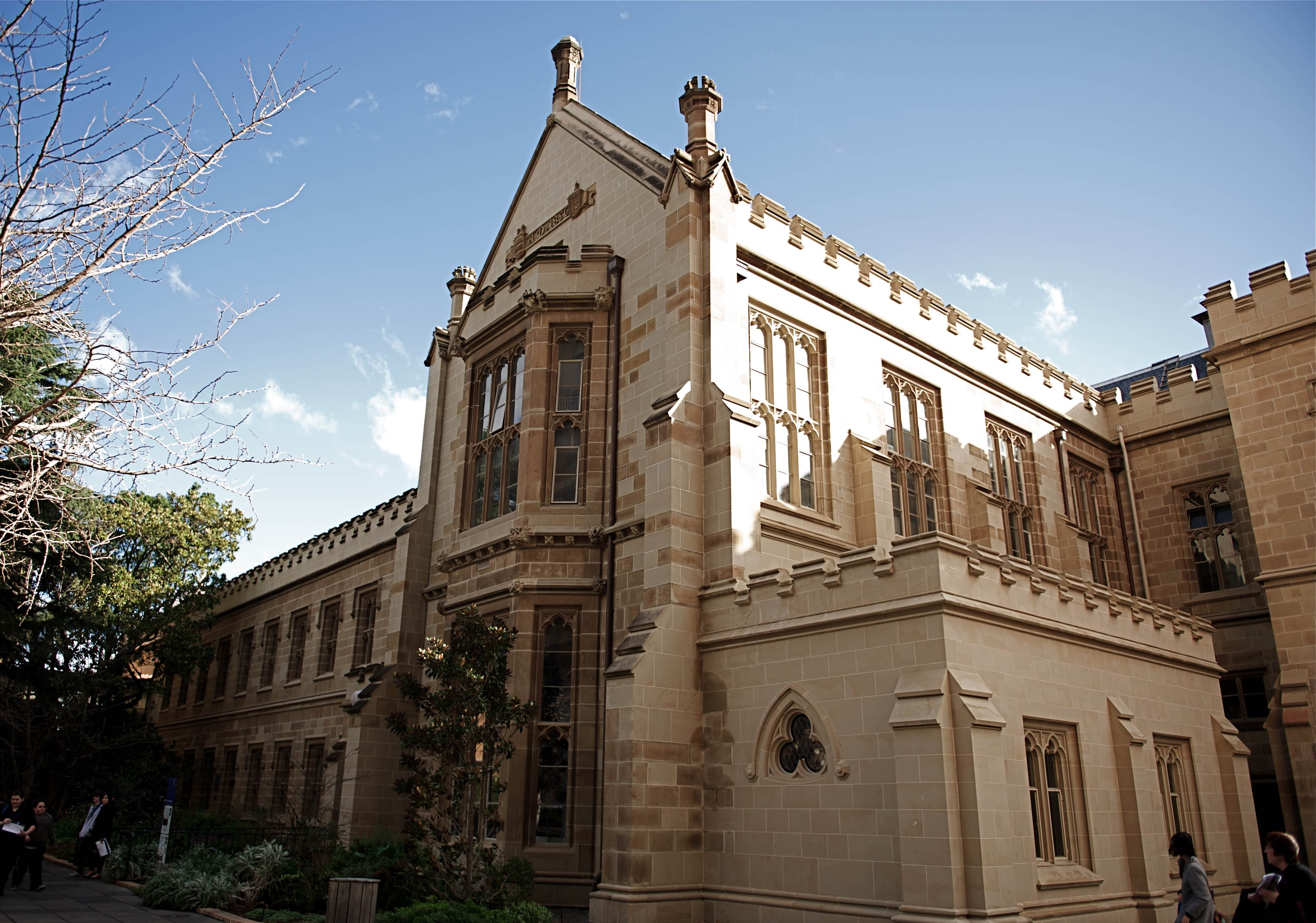
The 1854 Old Quad at the University of Melbourne, designed by English architect Francis Maloney White helped establish Melbourne's Gothic Revival beyond religious buildings.

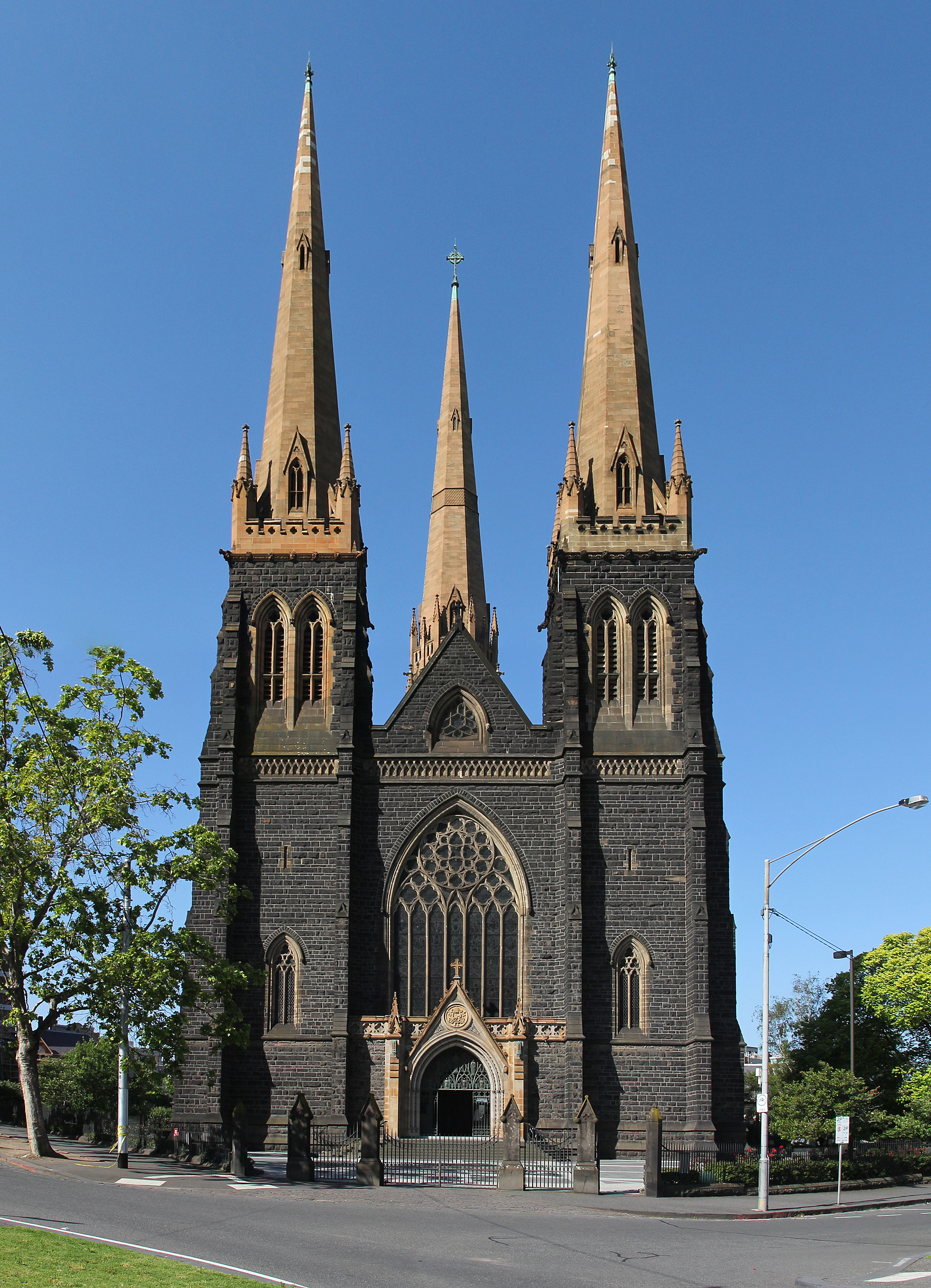
William Wardell's design for the massive bluestone Gothic Revival St Patrick's Cathedral, which would become Australia's tallest and largest, began to take shape in 1858

Melbourne's Gothic Revival was strong, particularly in early church design, but late to gain traction for other buildings, though the seeds were sown for its extraordinary later popularity. Among the first secular buildings to incorporate the style was the Old Law School Building and Old Quadrangle at the University of Melbourne (1854–1857), which set an academic theme for the entire campus that is still evident despite the later demolitions of the National Museum (1863) and Wilson Hall (1878). The Charles Webb designed Church Of England Grammar School (1856) helped establish gothic revival's popularity with the private schools and combined bluestone with impressive effect. Architects Crouch and Wilson would further promote this style in their designs for the College for the Deaf (1866) and College for the Blind (1868). Crouch and Wilson would go on to be one of the winners of a competition in 1873 for designs for primary schools (built in 1874 as Primary School No.1467 at South Yarra). Architect Henry R. Bastow, head of the building department of the Department of Education used this and the other winning designs, all in Gothic Revival schools, to create a distinctive style, and in some cases simply repeated designs. An example of Bastow's prominent early work is Primary School No.1479 in St Kilda (1874). Bastow established a preference for polychrome brickwork which would contribute to its growing popularity but also designed in other materials including bluestone at Williamstown Primary School (1878). Bishop's Building (1877–1878) by Frederick Wyatt part of the first residential college at Melbourne University's, Trinity College, is another significant gothic revival design in polychrome brick. Faraday Street State School Number 112 (1876–1877) is one of Reed and Barnes notable early works in education but Ormond College (1879–1881) is considered their largest and finest. Despite some pre-gold rush examples, gothic was still rare as a residential style. As the popularity of Italianate styles dominated, Tudor revival had fallen out of favour. Notable exceptions include Glenfern at St Kilda East (1857), a row of houses at 39–41 Nicholson Street, Abbotsford (1858–1869) and the Joseph Reed designed 157 Hotham Street East Melbourne (1861). Gothic revival purists sought a major religious landmark for the early city, however despite the numerous spires which dotted the early skyline including those of the bluestone Wesley, but with St Patrick's Cathedral remaining incomplete, would not find a true icon until the construction of the Joseph Reed designed Scots Church (1871–1874). Built upon Collins Street hill it was considered to be one of the finest church designs in Australia. Leonard Terry's landmark two storey building in Hawthorn for the ES&A Bank (1873) is an early example of gothic applied to secular buildings and also an early commercial use of Hawthorn brick a mode of building which would become highly popular with architects over the subsequent decades.

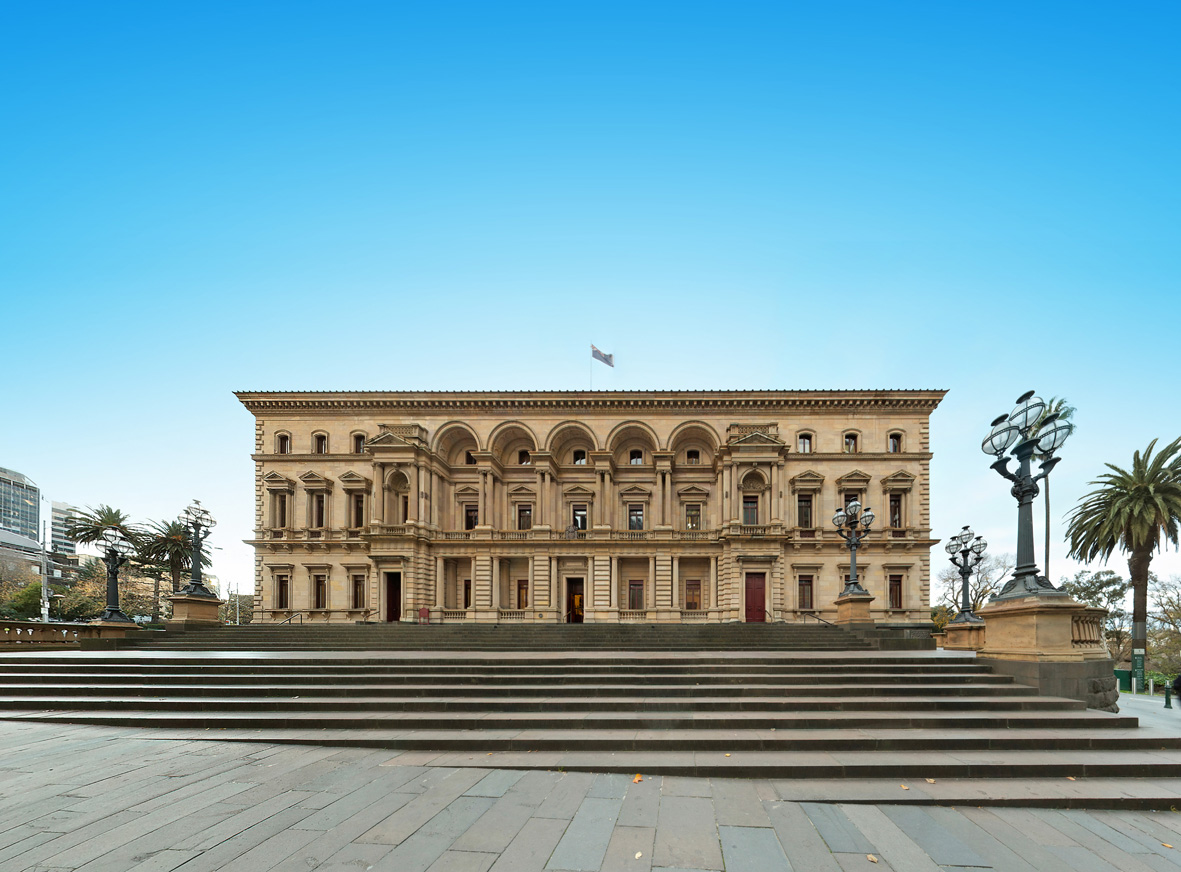
Old Treasury, designed by John James Clark in 1857 to hold the enormous amount of gold coming from regional Victoria, is considered to be Australia's finest Renaissance Revival building.

John James Clark's Old Treasury (1858–62) is considered Australia's finest Renaissance Revival building. It features bluestone vaults intended for storing gold mined from the central Victorian goldfields. The Old Treasury, along with his Melbourne Mint (1872), Government House (1874), Victorian Titles Office (1874–1877) and Customs House (1876) inspired a brief trend of Palazzo style architecture for public buildings which was also used at 2 Treasury Place (1876). While Italianate architecture styles were outnumbered by academic classical for public buildings they would become extremely fashionable for commercial, institutional and residential architecture across the city. Institutional buildings included Victoria Barracks (1856–1872), Leonard Terry's designs for the Melbourne Club (1859) the first stage 2 storey Melbourne GPO (1861 – prior to extensions), the Royal Arcade (1870), Kew Asylum (1871), Peter Kerr designed Customs House in Williamstown (1873–1875), Leonard Terry's former Campbell Residence (1877) and Lloyd Tayler's design for the Australian Club (1879). Among the commercial buildings were the Former Commercial Bank of Australia (1867), London and Chartered Bank (1870–1871), Lloyd Tayler's Portland House (1872) and the Bank of Australasia (1876). Numerous public hotels across the city employed the style, including Young and Jacksons (1853–1861), Former Eastern Hill Hotel (1854–1856), and the Esplanade Hotel St Kilda (1878). Italianate became the favoured residential style and despite later widespread demolition the city retains a plethora of palatial examples. Viewing towers, in particular became a signal of wealth, popularised by the earlier landmarks Bishopscourt and Toorak House, others followed notably Rostella (1867 demolished 1970), Raheen (1870–1884), Government House (1871–1876), Eildon (1872) and Werribee Park (1874–1877).

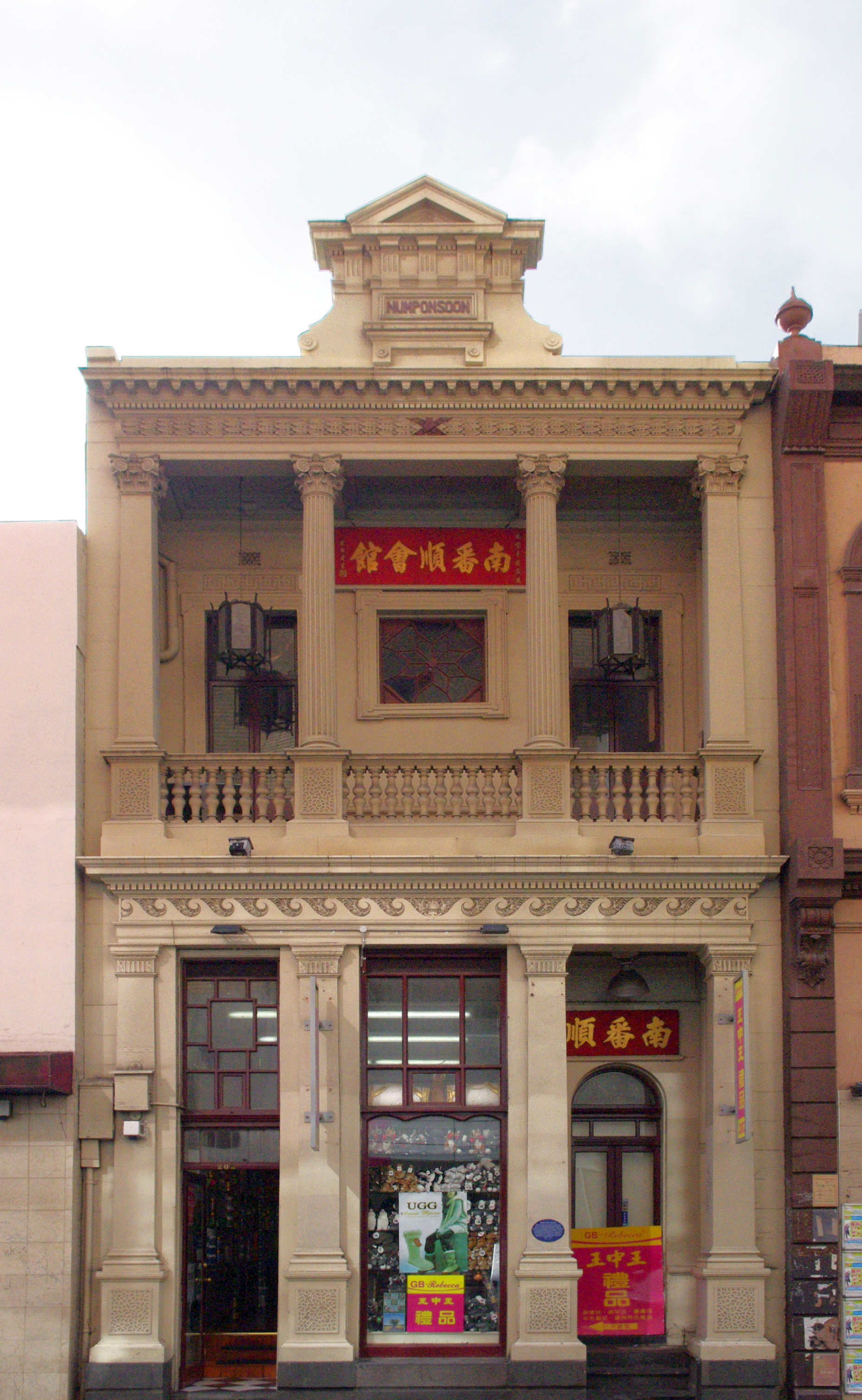
Num Pon Soon built in Chinatown in 1860 exemplifies the gold rush influence of the Chinese community

Melbourne's Chinatown and nearby Little Lon district emerged during the gold rush and illustrated a significant contrast in style to the stately institutional buildings with their chaotic development among Melbourne's laneways. Portable prefabricated iron buildings were common in early Melbourne's gold rush slums and some remain especially in Fitzroy, Collingwood and Emerald Hill (South Melbourne). Melbourne's large Chinese community originated through the gold rush. Num Pon Soon (1860–1861) in Chinatown, by Melbourne architects Knight & Kerr, is a rare Australian example of Victorian architecture incorporating Chinese motifs. Another important building was the Chinese Mission for Victoria society building (1872) by architects Crouch and Wilson was constructed at 196 Little Bourke Street, its visually striking polychrome brick patterning making it a landmark of Chinatown. Further out of the city, the See Yup Society Temple (1856–1866) by architect George Wharton was another landmark to Melbourne's large Chinese community which had strong oriental influences in its design.

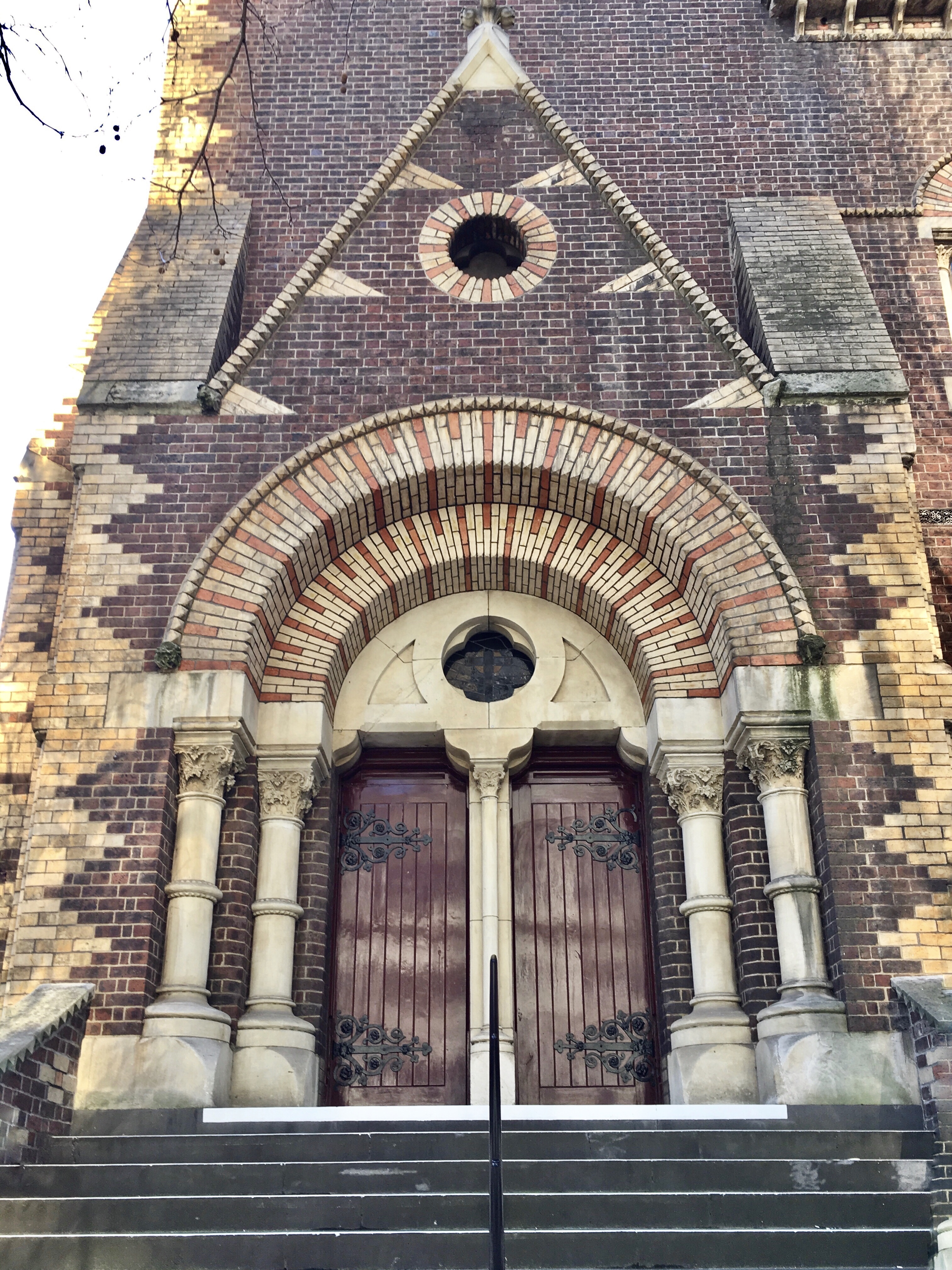
Details of St Michaels Church, Collins Street, 1866, the first example of elaborate polychrome brickwork in Australia, a design feature which proved immensely popular in Victorian era Melbourne

Joseph Reed's design for Collins Street Independent Church (1866) (now St Michael's) is notable not only as the earliest examples of elaborate polychrome brickwork in Australia (a style that became highly popular by the 1880s) but also for its unusual floorplan and tower. It was one of the few major church buildings not designed in the popular gothic revival of the time, and its elevated position on the Collins Street hill made it a major landmark of the early city until the construction of nearby Scots Church (1871–1874). Described as Lombardic Romanesque in style, it features a tall square bell tower marking an important street corner, and round Romanesque arches around doors and windows and the open cloisters in each side. The interior was designed in the form of a theatre auditorium, in accordance with the principles of the Congregationalist Church, as a place where all members of the congregation could both hear and see the preacher. It features a sloping floor with tiered seating, and a steep gallery behind a ring of high aches on slender cast iron columns, ensuring good sight lines. The polychromatic style would influence Reed & Barnes' design for St Jude's Church, Carlton later that year but applied in the gothic style with Florentine arches. Many later religious buildings across Melbourne would be influenced by these designs in the following decades.

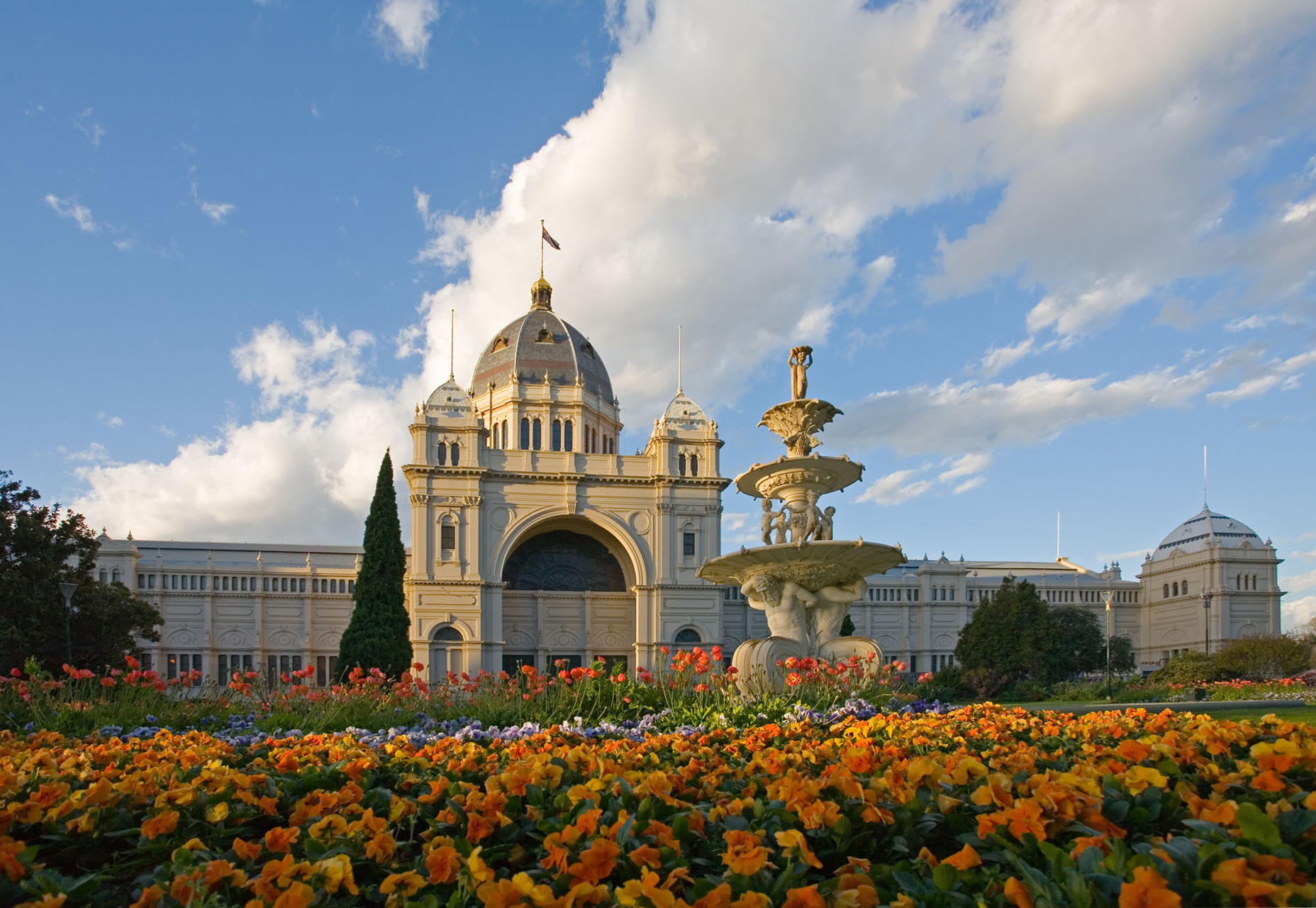
The Royal Exhibition Building (1879), a UNESCO World Heritage Site.

The Royal Exhibition Building, with its UNESCO World Heritage status is Melbourne's most important building internationally. Built to host the Melbourne International Exhibition in 1880–81 it went on to play an enormous part in the cultural identity of the city and resisted many attempts at its demolition. Designed by the architect Joseph Reed it is an eclectic representative of the Byzantine, Romanesque, Lombardic and Italian Renaissance styles. The dome was modeled on the Florence Cathedral, while the main pavilions were influenced by the style of Rundbogenstil and several buildings from Normandy, Caen and Paris. The building has the scale of the French Beaux Arts, with a cruciform plan in the shape of a Latin cross, with long nave-like wings symmetrically placed east–west about the central dome, and a shorter wing to the north. The Great Hall is still in beautiful condition, crowned by an octagonal drum and dome rising 68 metres, and 18.3 metres across. The dome was formed using cast iron and timber frame and has a double shell. At the crossing, windows in the drum of the dome bring in sunlight for a bright open space.

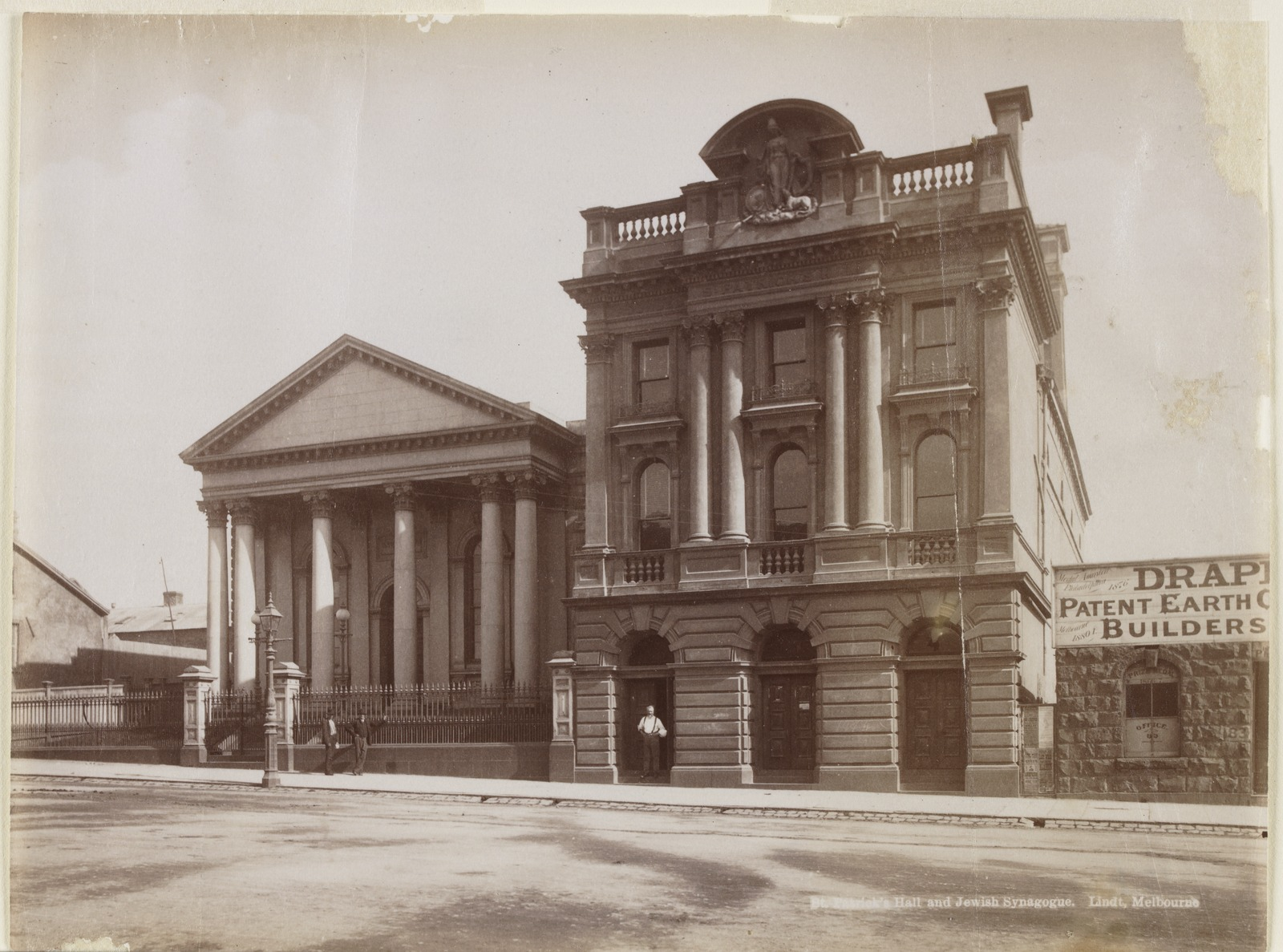
Melbourne Synagogue and St Patrick's Hall, 1870

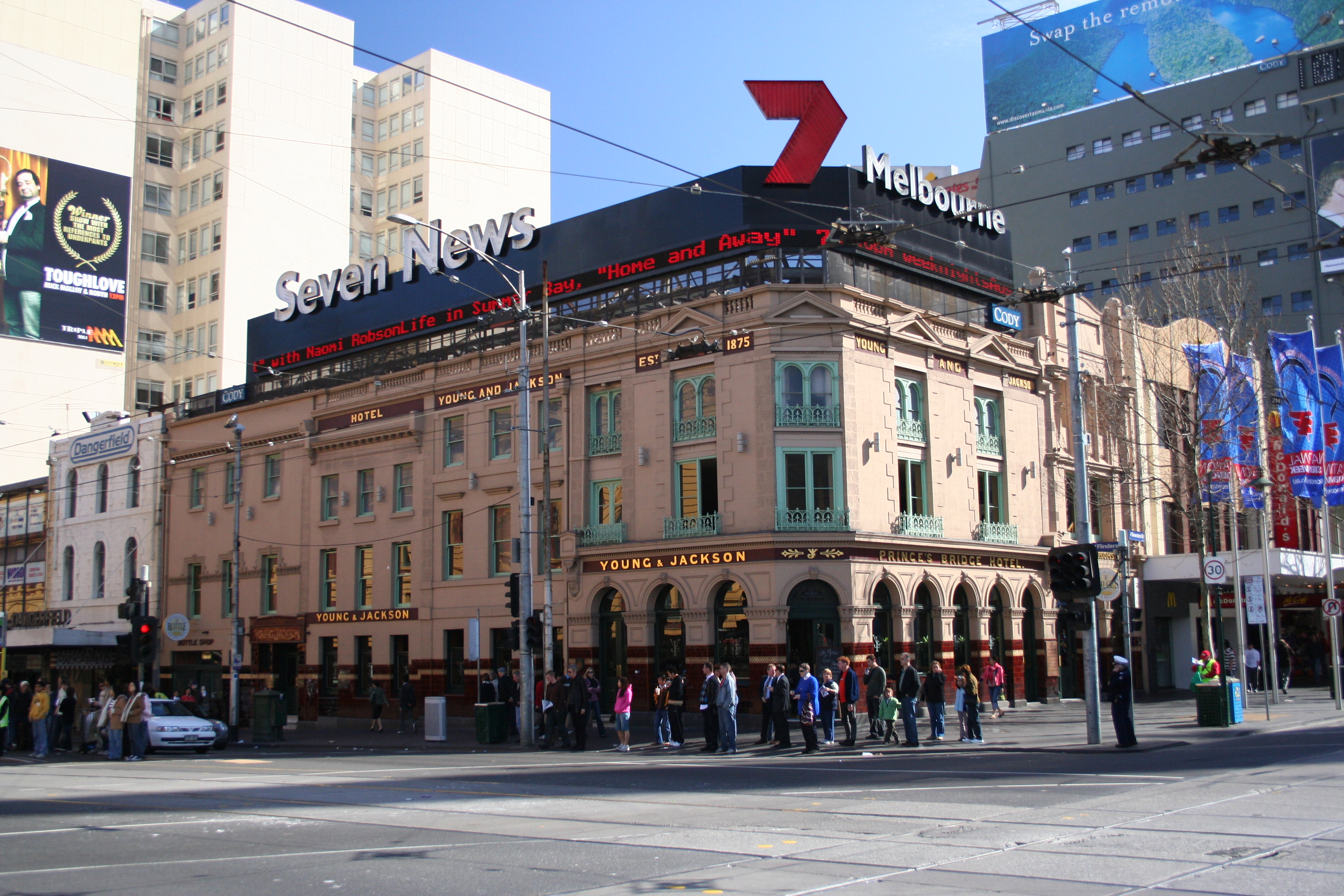
Young & Jackson (1853)

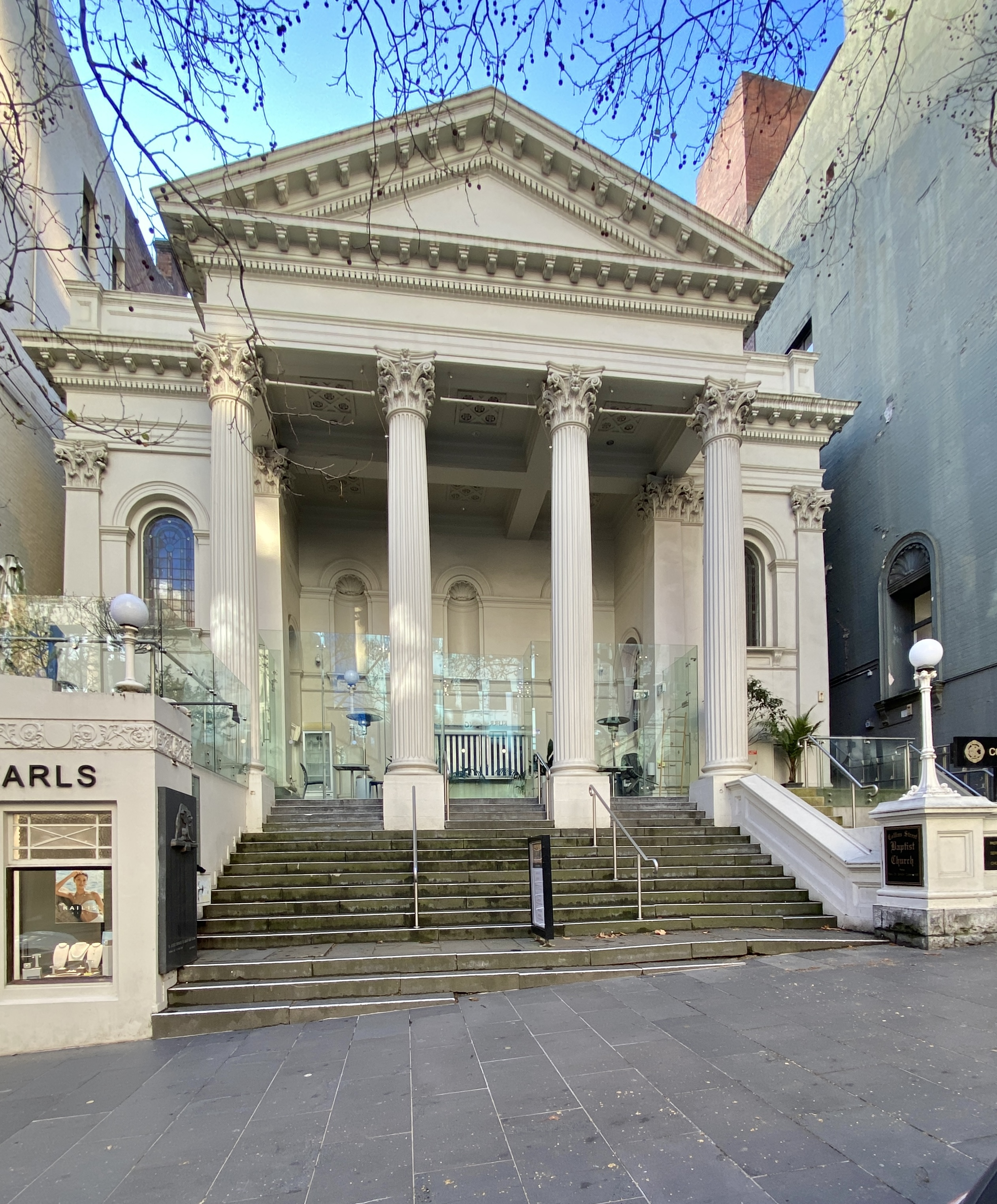
Collins Street Baptist Church (1854)

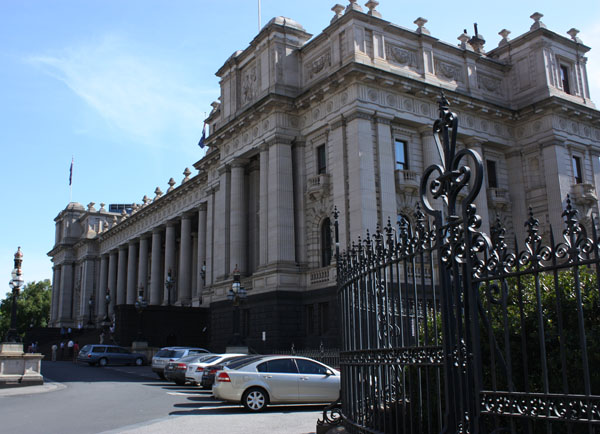
Victorian Parliament House (1855)

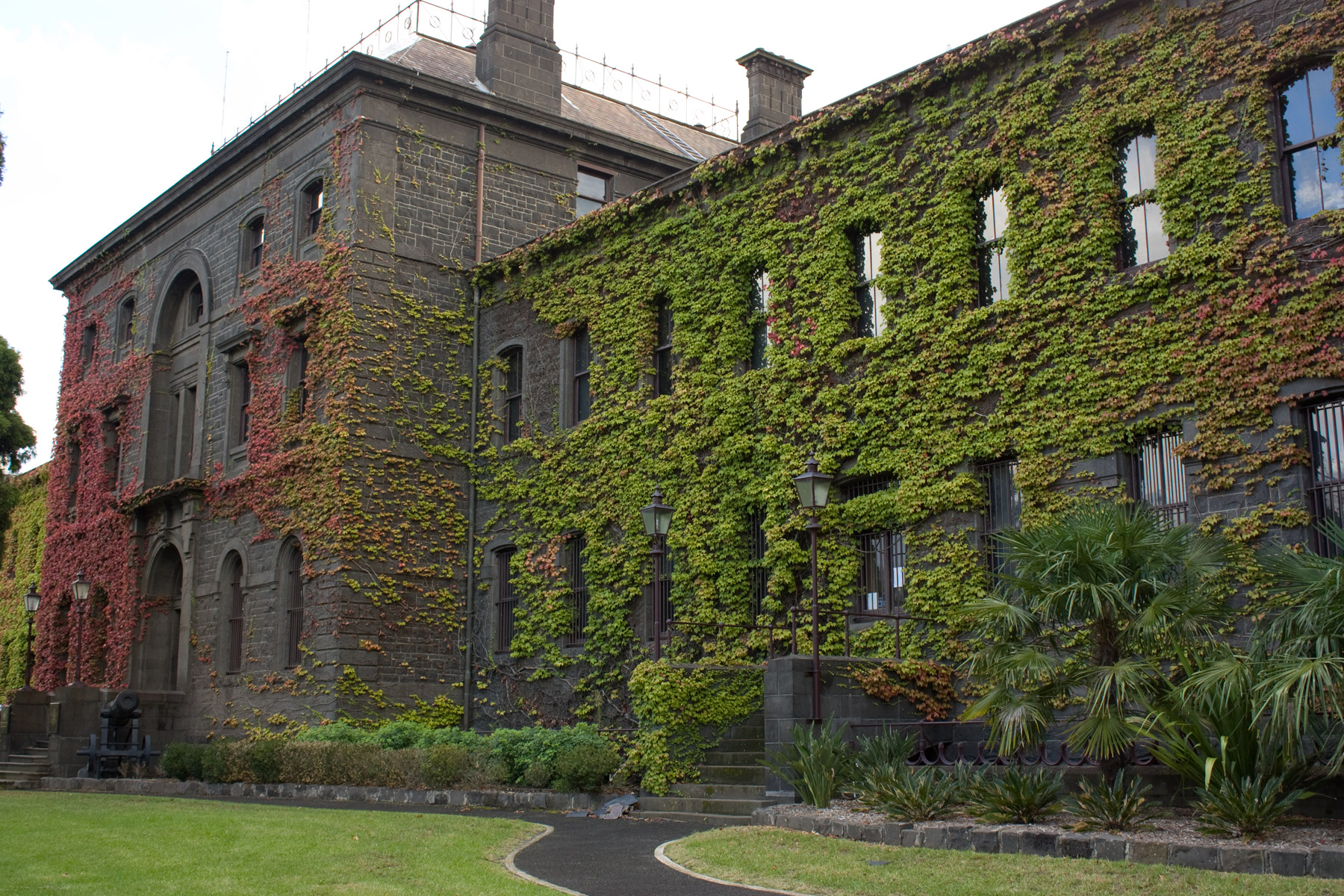
Victoria Barracks (1856)

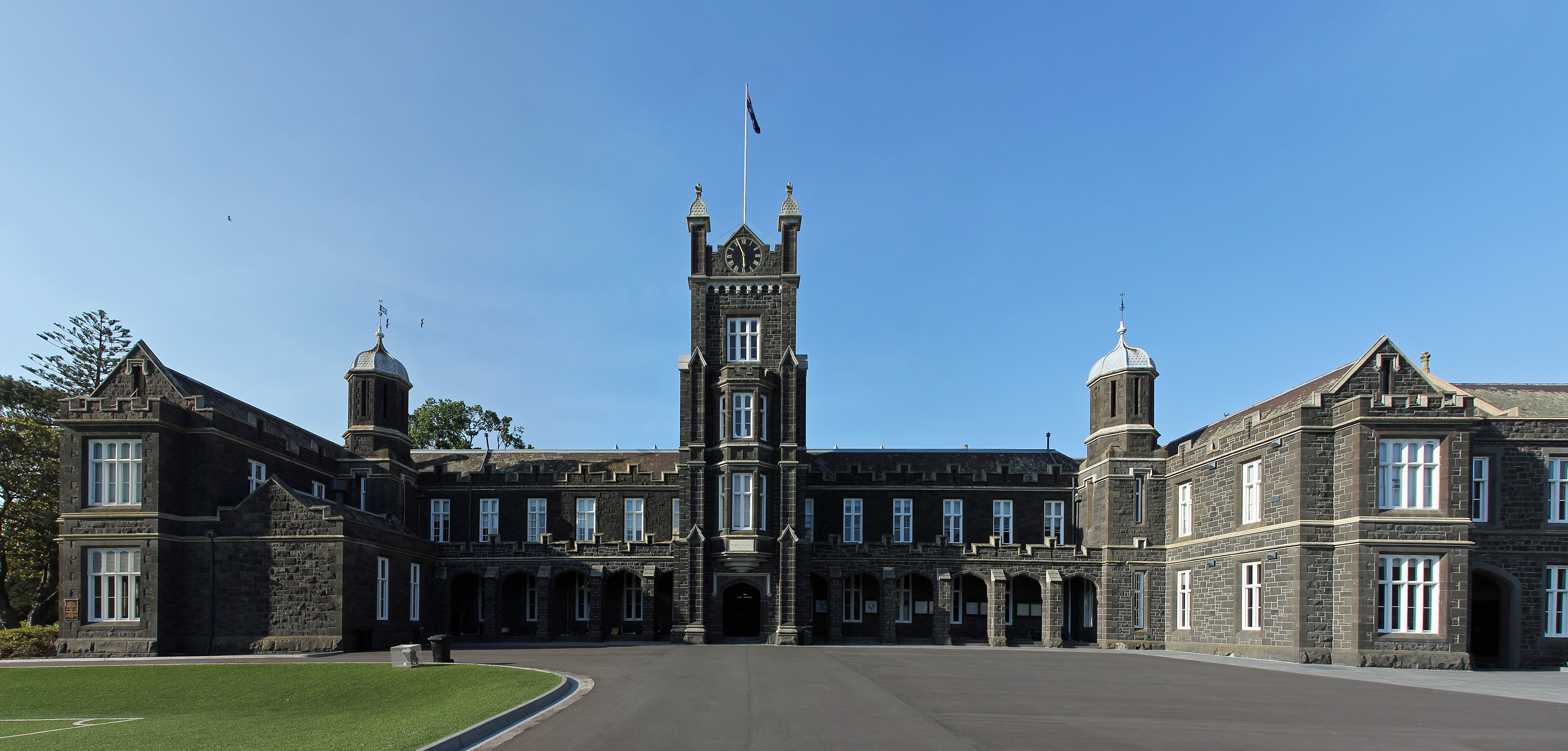
Witherby Tower, Melbourne Church of England Grammar (1856)

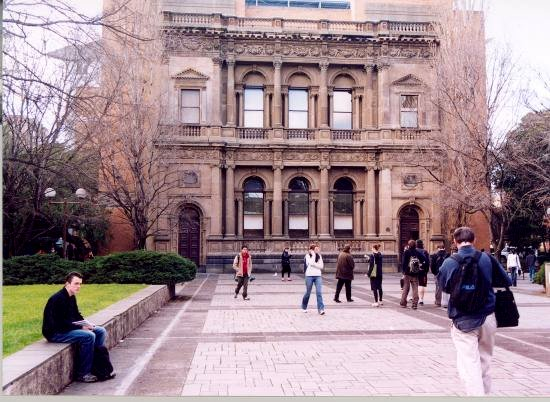
Bank of New South Wales facade (1857)

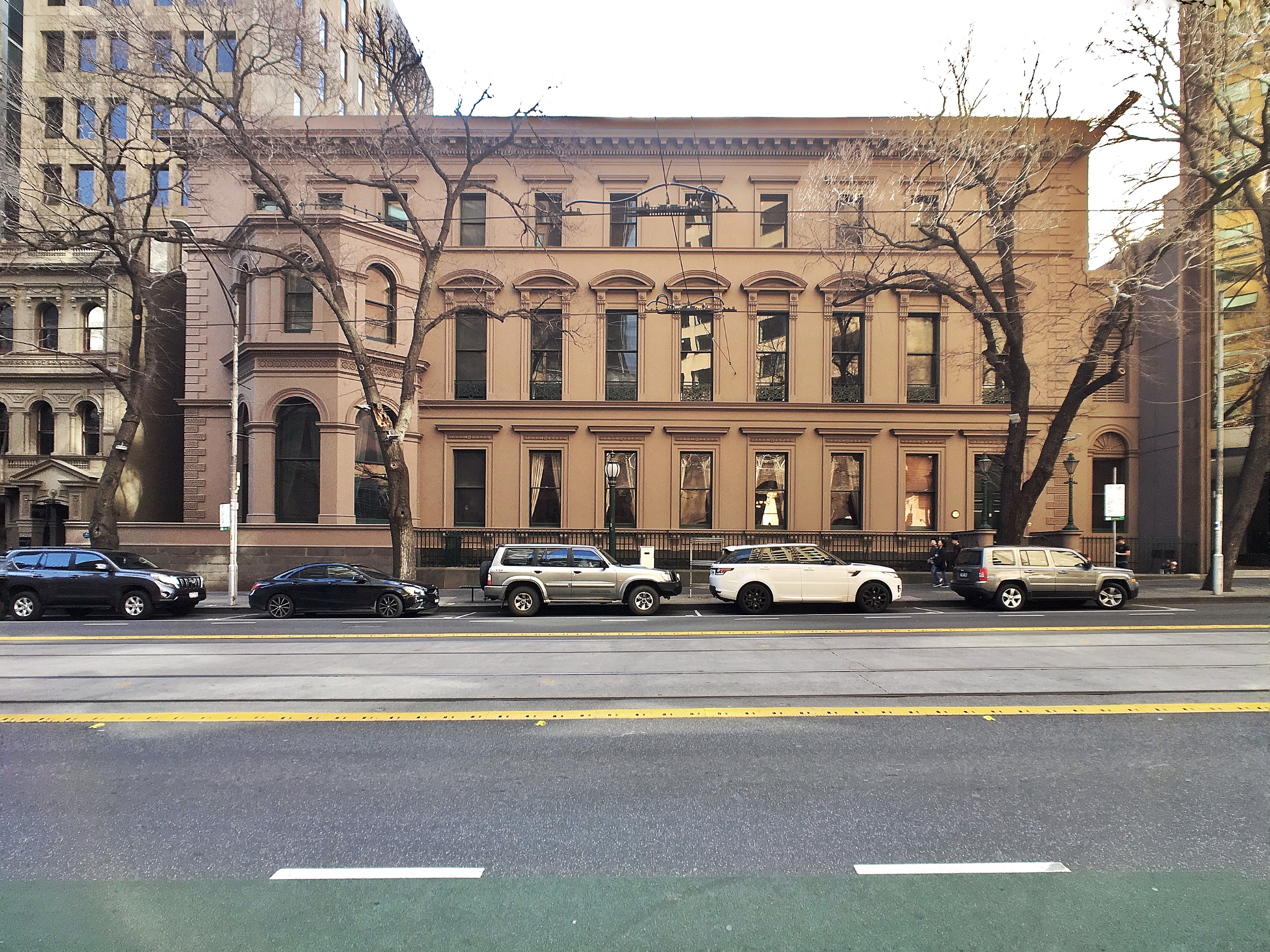
Melbourne Club (1859)

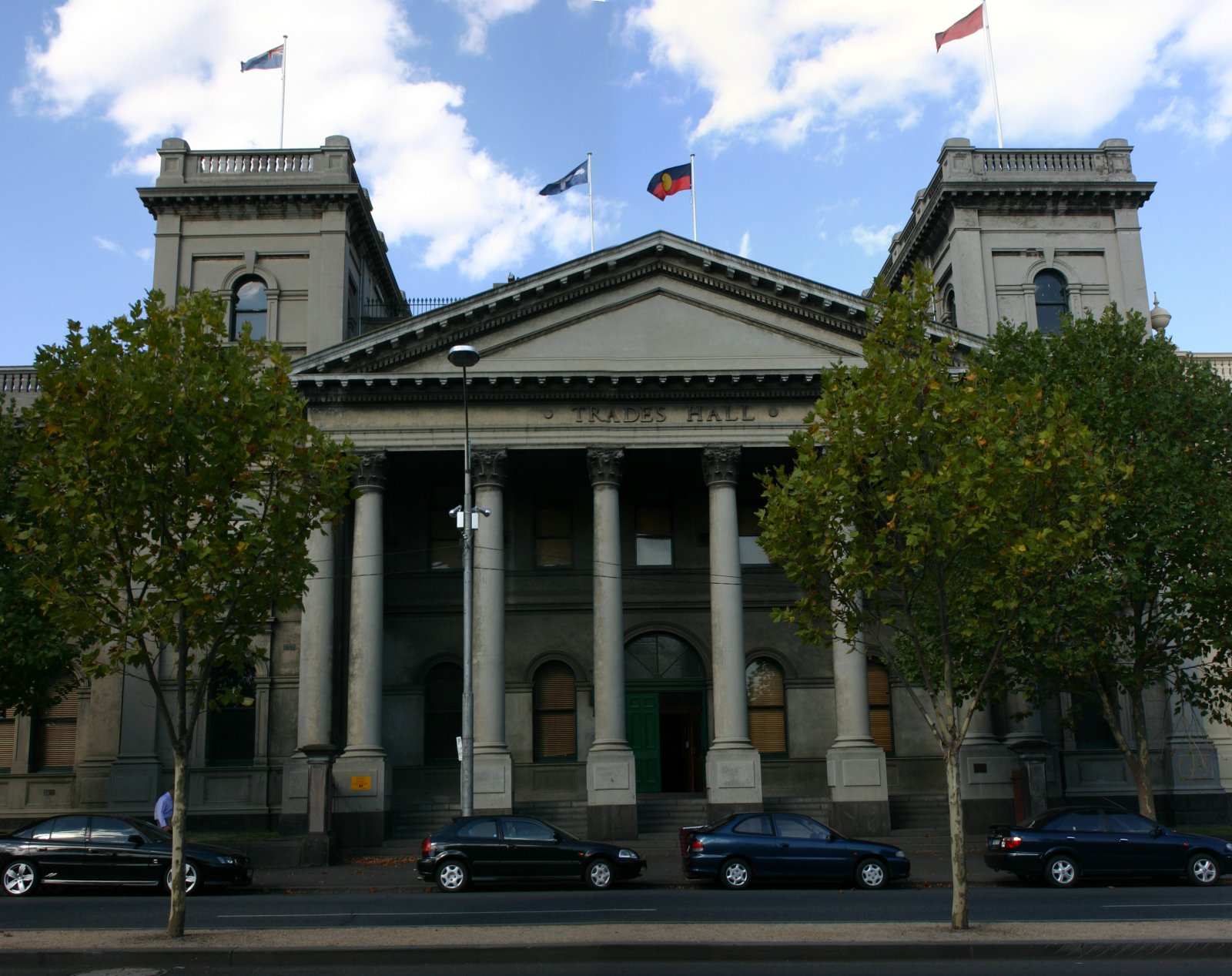
Victorian Trades Hall (1859)

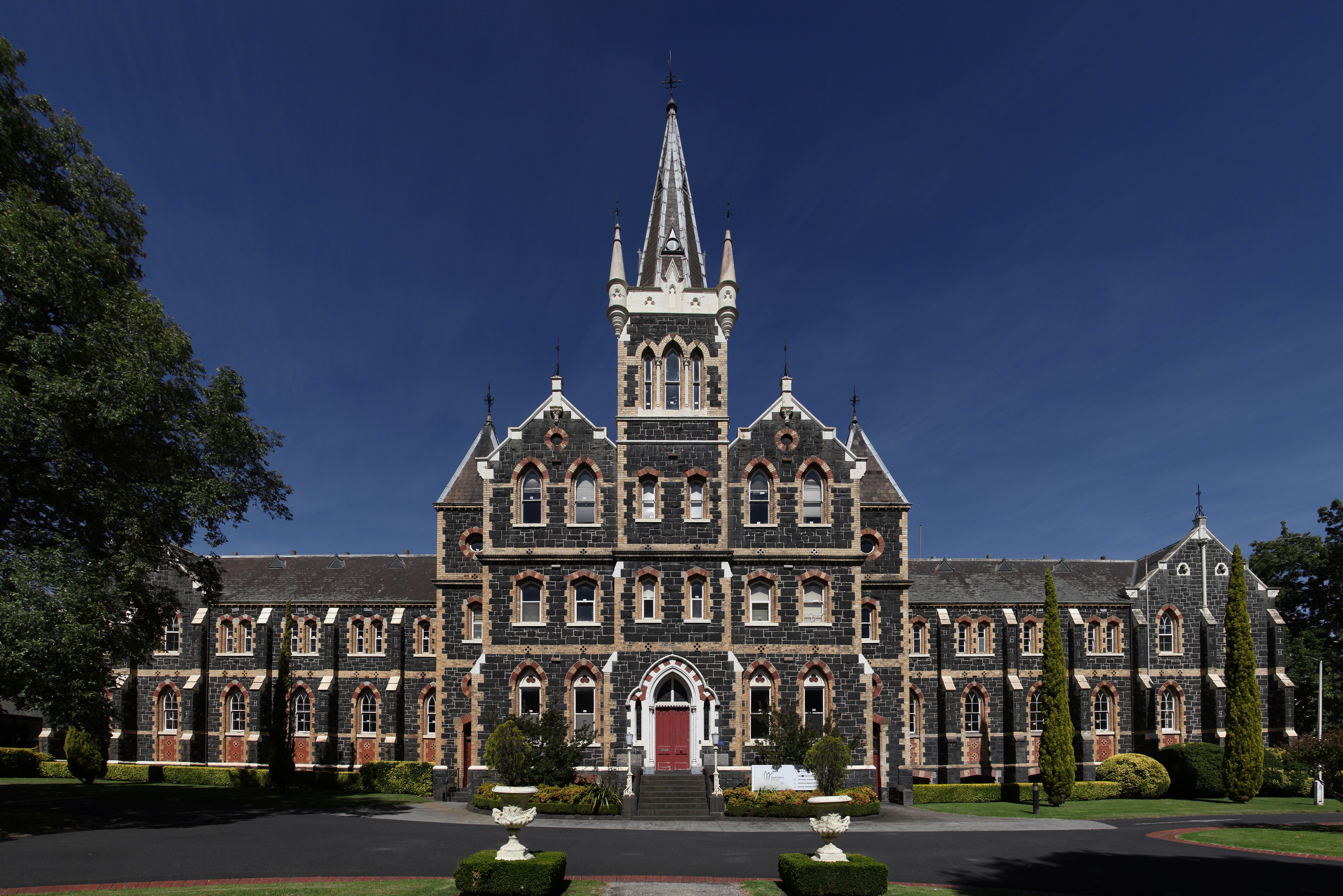
Victorian College for the Deaf (1866)

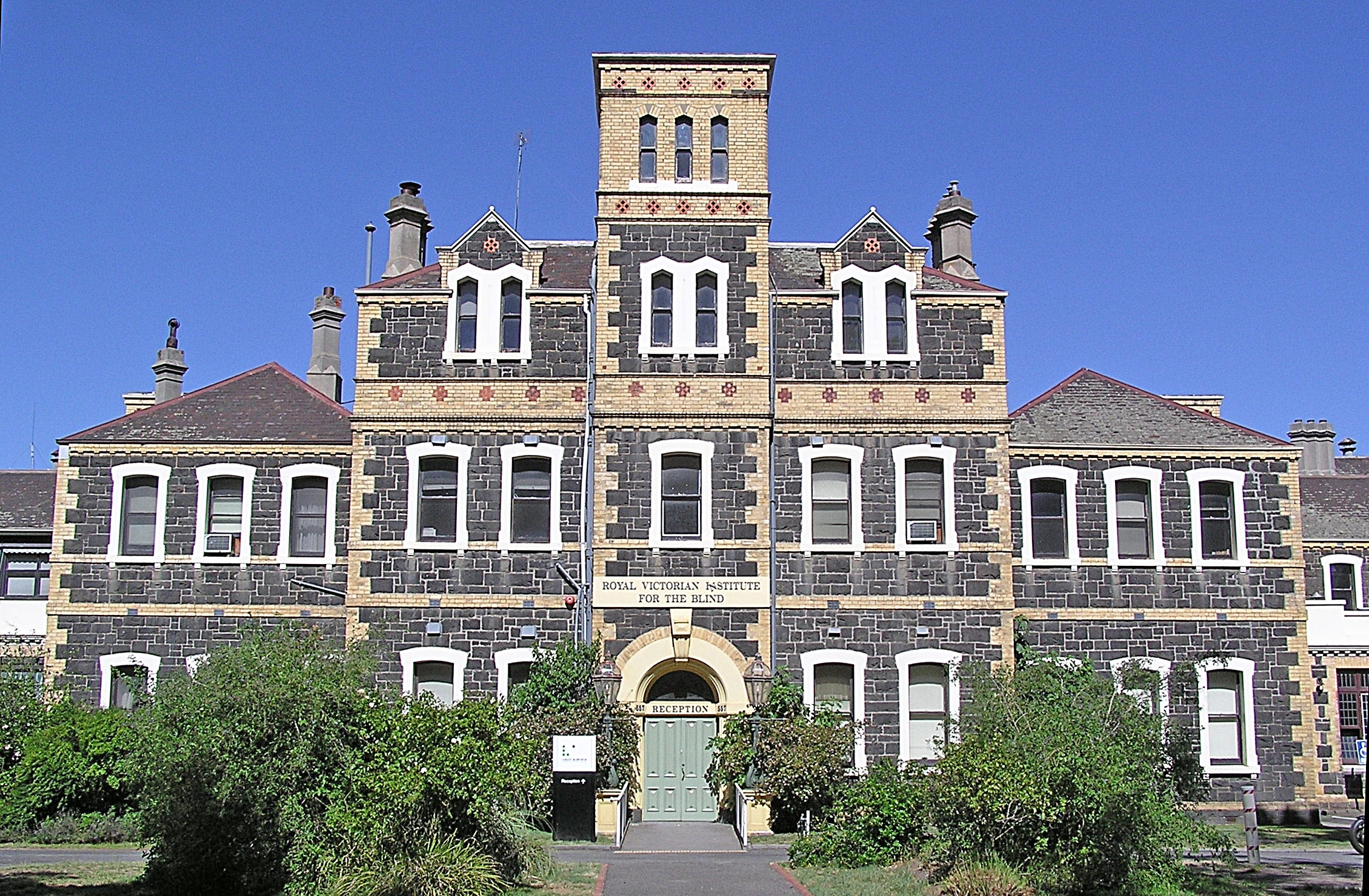
Victorian College for the Blind (1868)

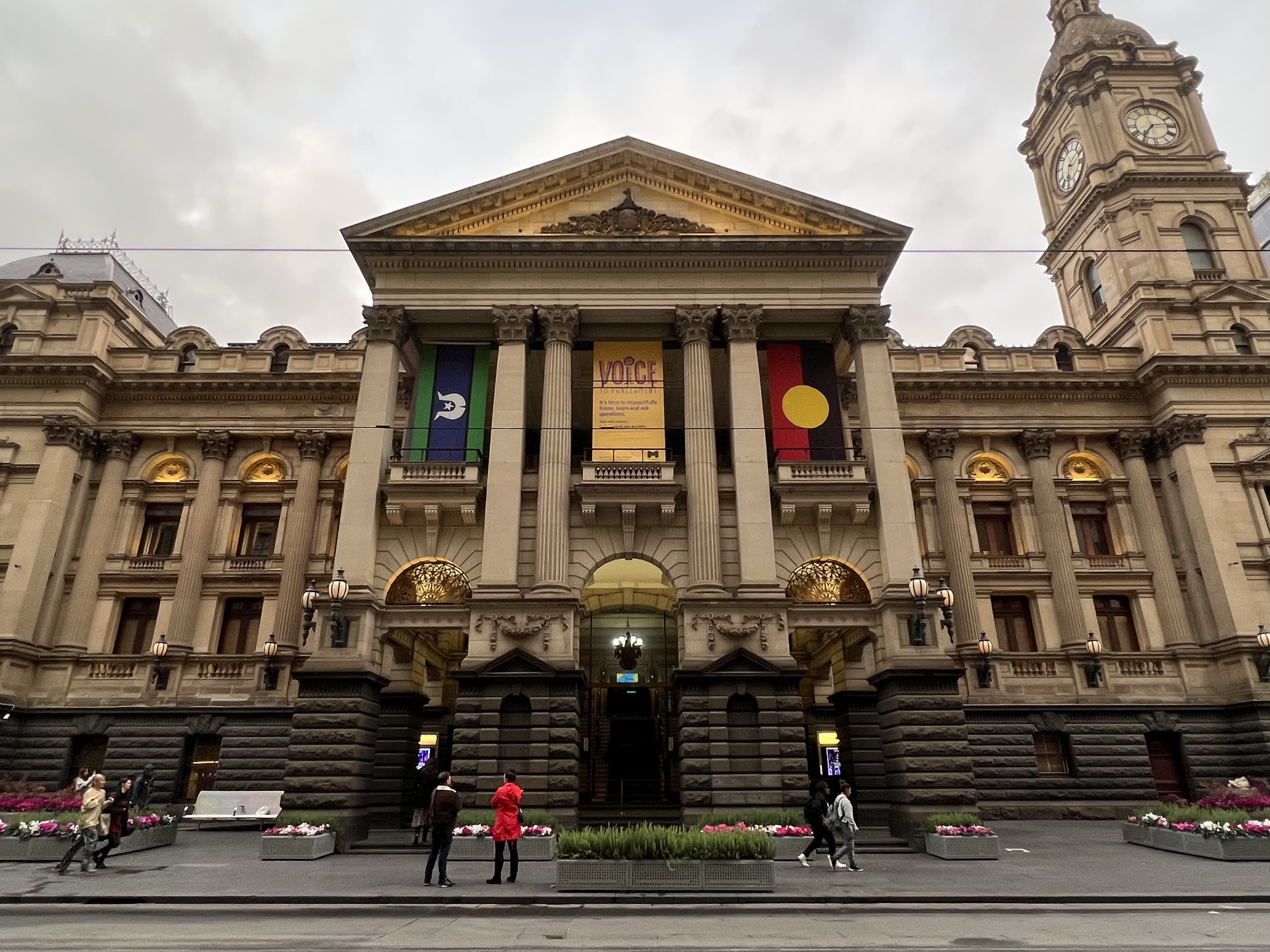
Melbourne Town Hall (1869)

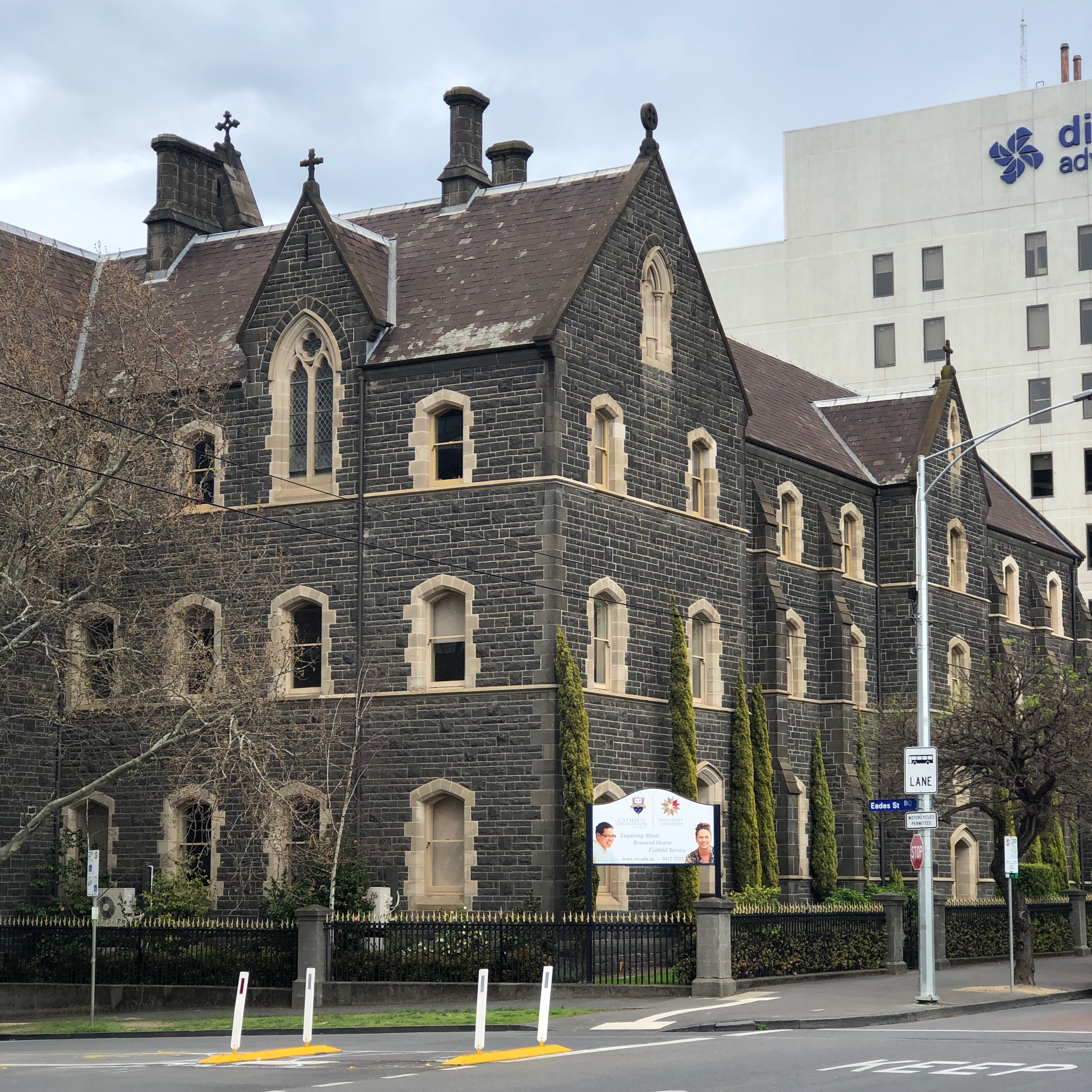
Christian Brothers College by William Wardell (1869)

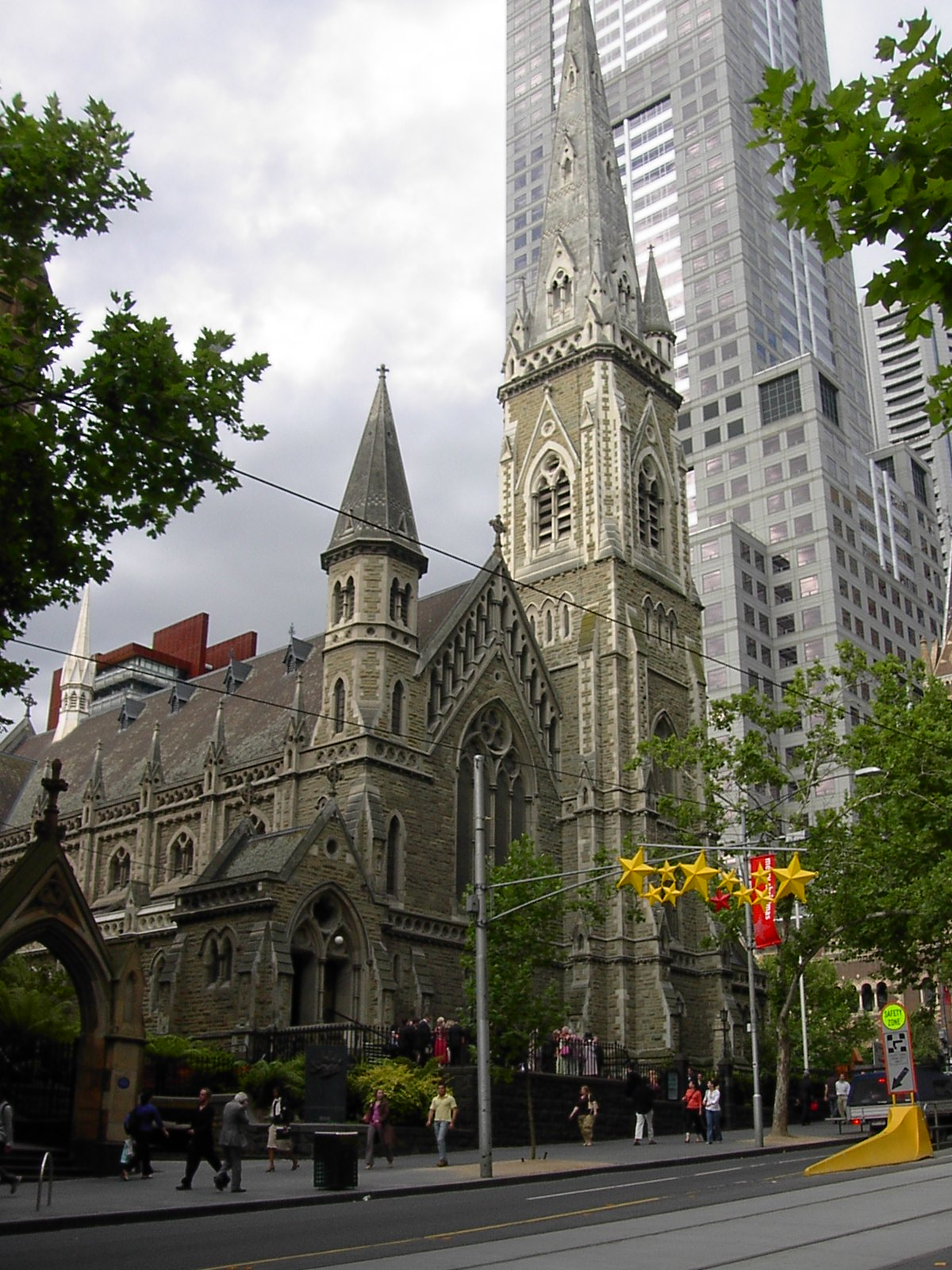
Scots Church (1871)

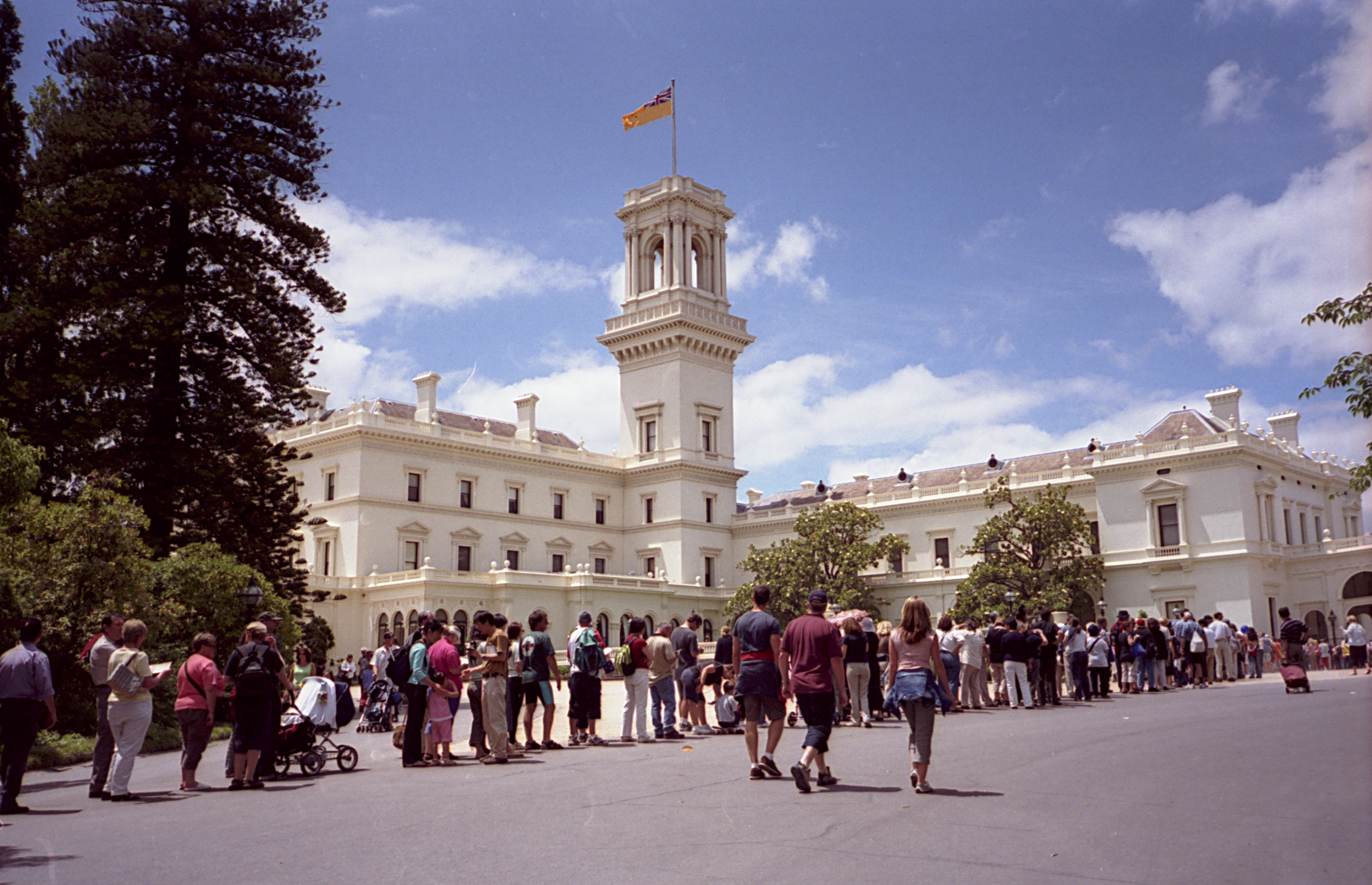
Government House (1871)

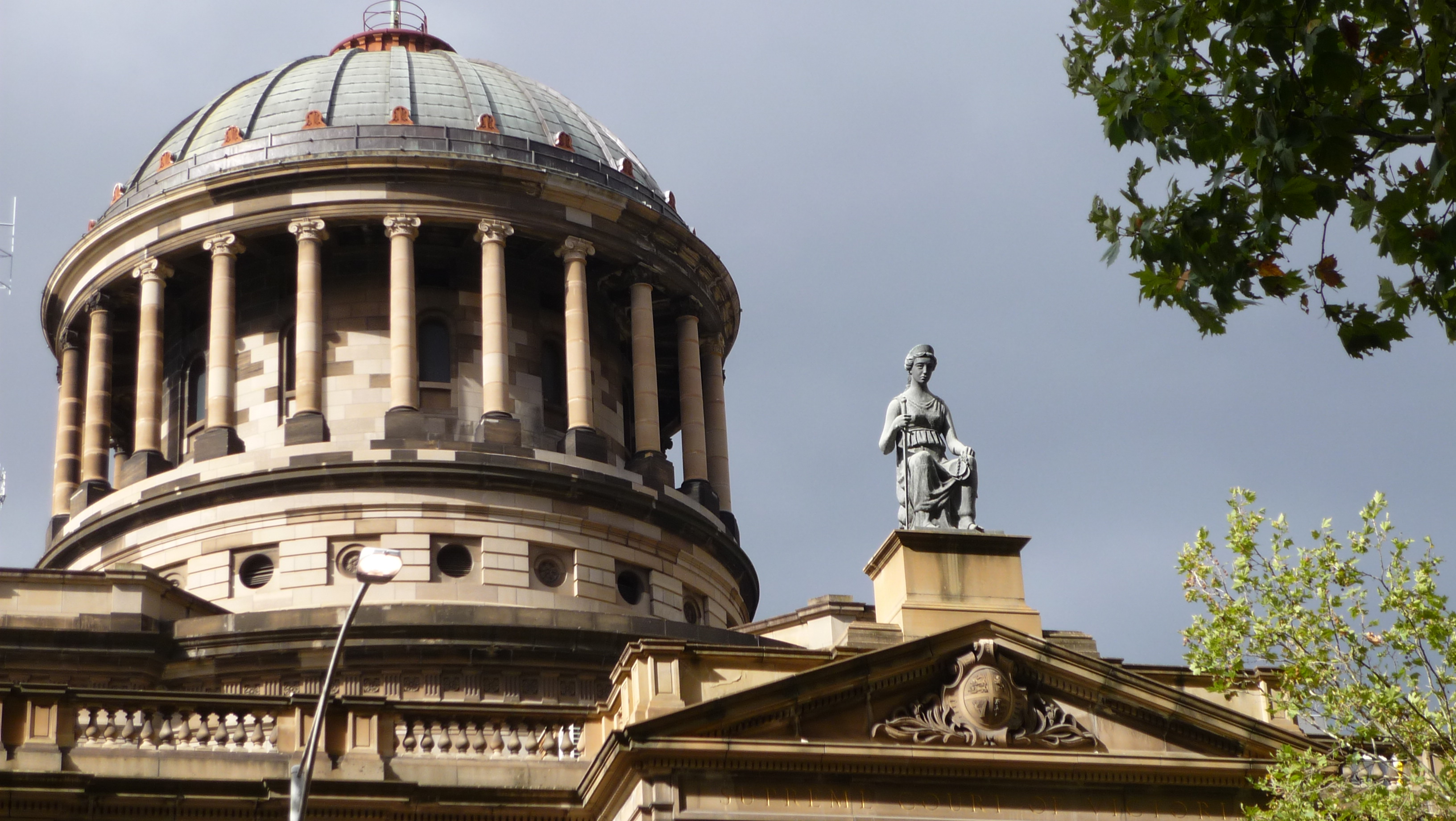
Supreme Court by Smith & Johnson (1874)

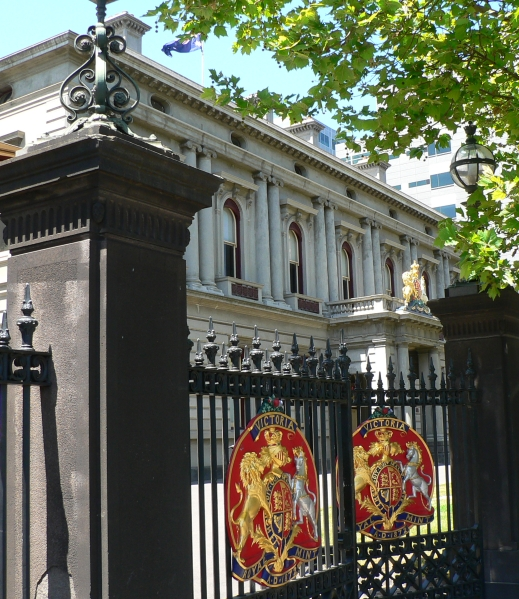
Royal Mint (1874)

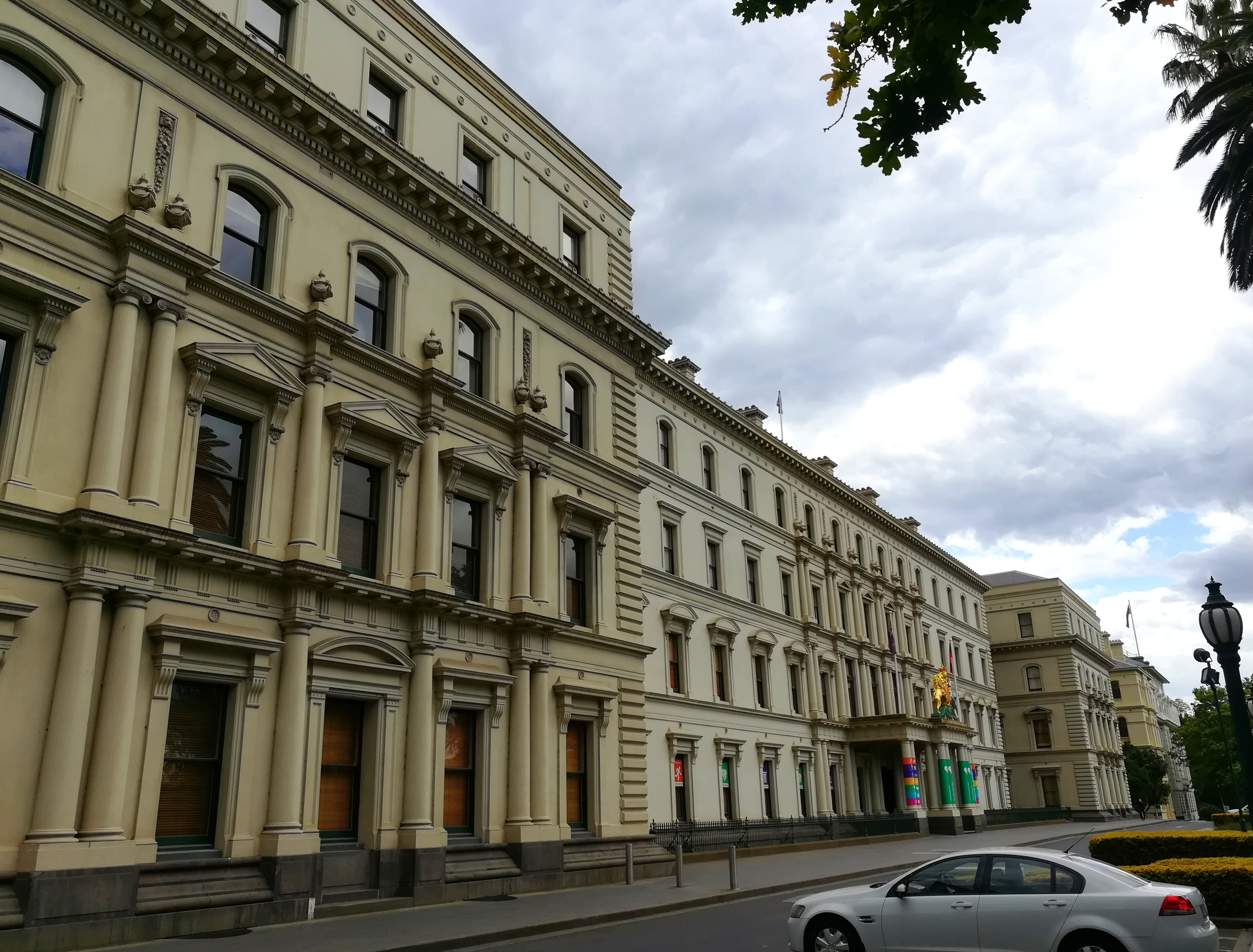
Treasury Place (1876)

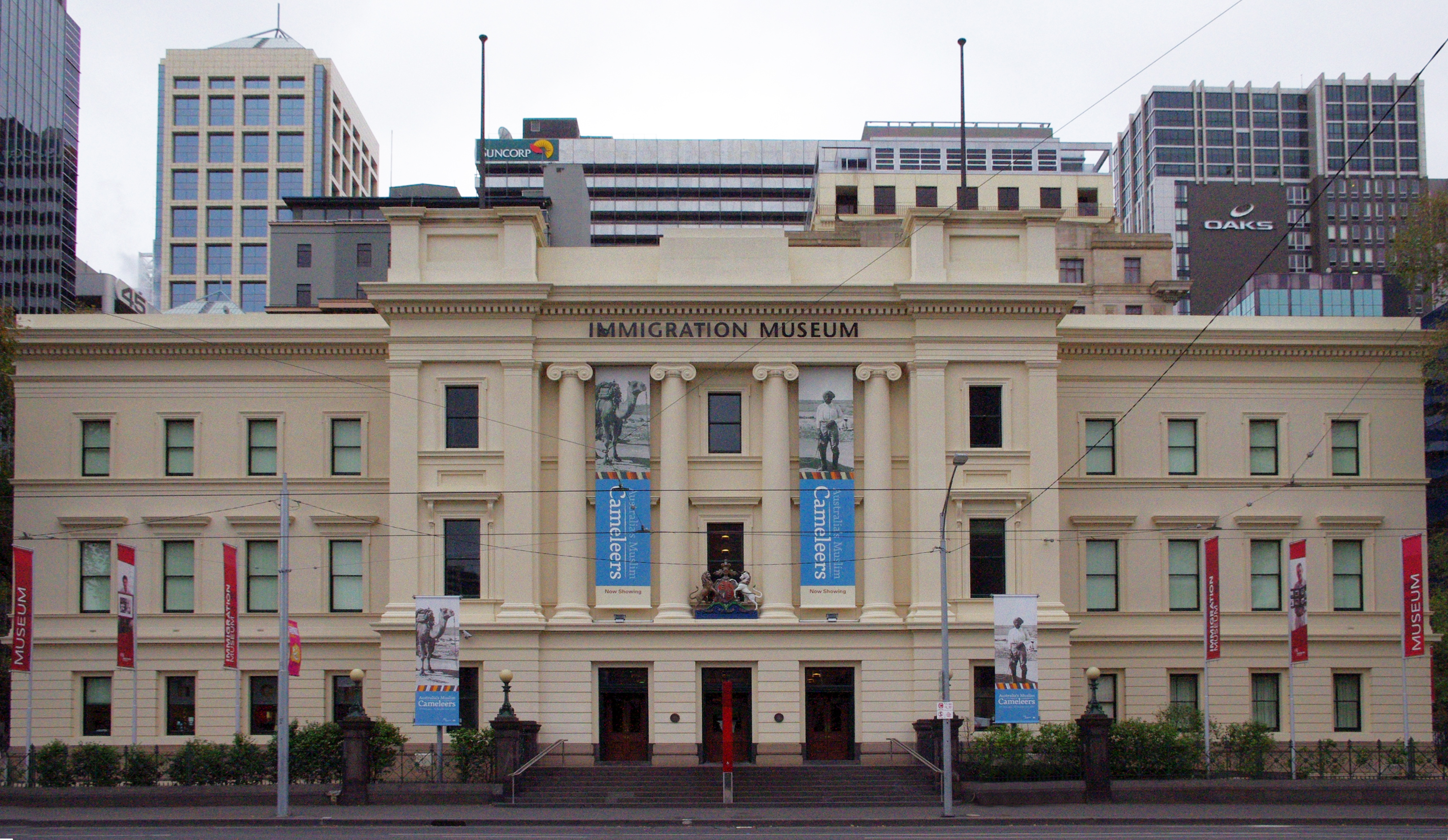
Customs House (1876)

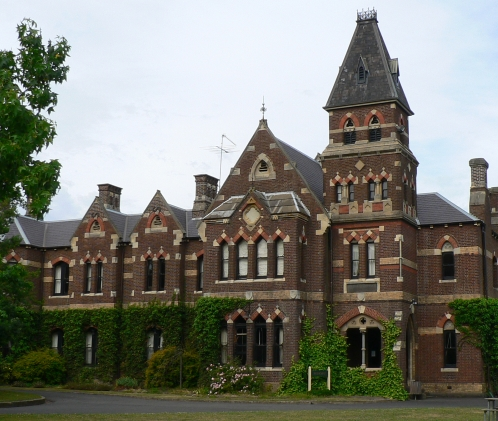
Bishop's Building (1877)

=== 1880–1893: "Marvellous Melbourne" Land Boom era ===
The 1880s saw the price of land start to boom, and London banks were eager to extend loans to men of vision who capitalised on this by speculation, and grand, elaborate offices, hotel and department stores in the city, and endless suburban subdivisions. This was the growth that so astonished visiting journalist George Augustus Sala in 1885, that he dubbed the city "Marvellous Melbourne".

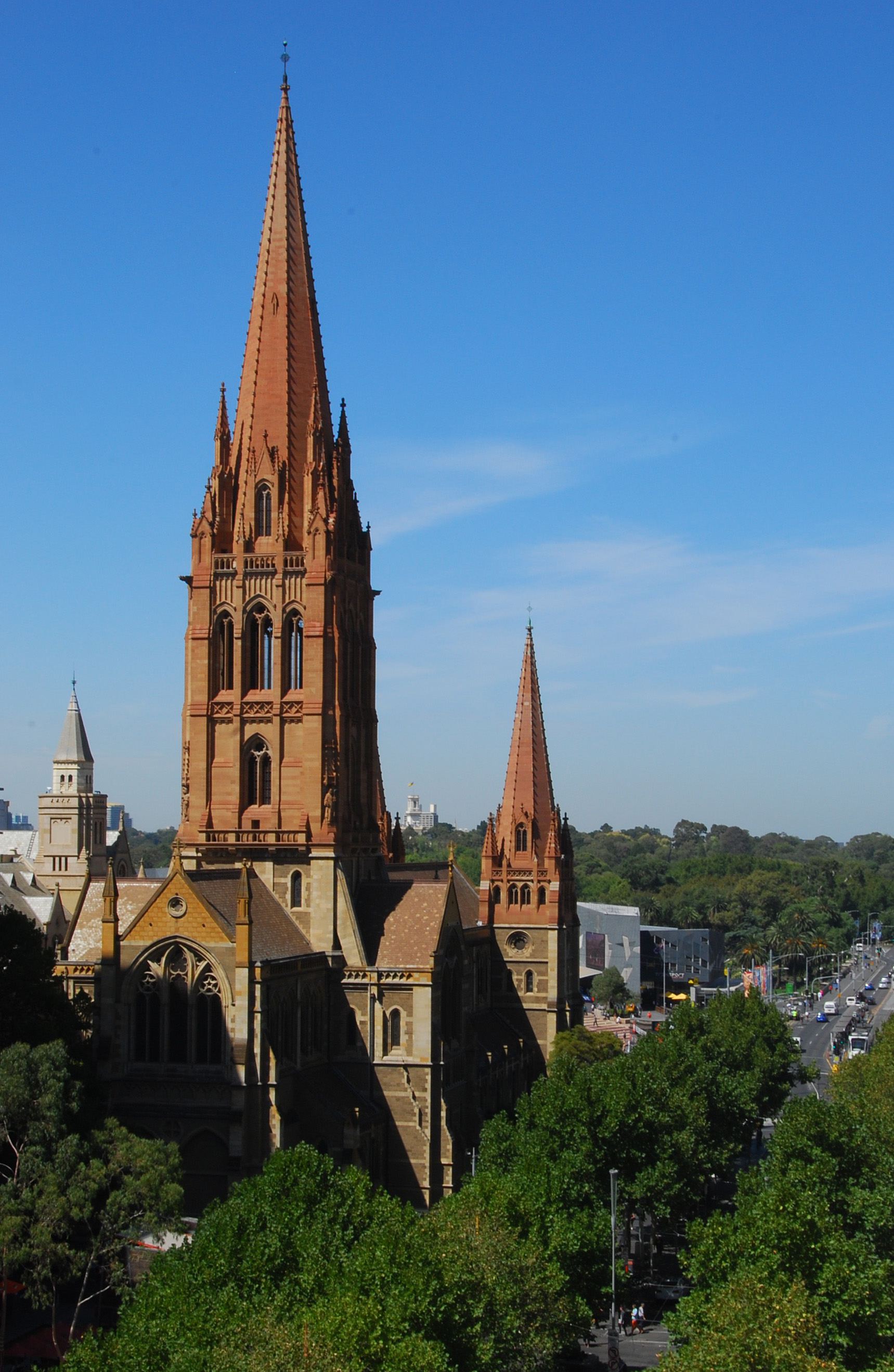
St Paul's Cathedral designed by William Butterfield emerged as a major landmark of the city from 1880 even without its later redesigned spires

Most of the city's religious buildings were erected during the gold rush era and many were already quite elaborate edifices even before the rising price of land. While many churches had progressed from classical to gothic forms, High Victorian architects now had a wider range of styles from which to draw upon. However the original St Paul's church, occupying a prominent entrance to the city at the intersection of Flinders and Swanston Streets had been planned to be replaced with a large English gothic style cathedral which would become St Paul's Anglican Cathedral (1880–1891). Designed by English architect William Butterfield, it occupied a prominent site in the heart of the city on Flinders Street at the entrance of Princes Bridge making it a highly visible landmark even without its later completed spires. The interior features rich colours and strident colour contrasts, characteristic of Butterfield's work, compared to the exterior, with contrasting stripes of the very dark-coloured local bluestone. An unusual design for the period is the Sacred Heart Church (1884) in St Kilda designed by Reed, Henderson and Smart in a Baroque Italianate style. The Former Church of Christ Abbotsford (1888–1889) designed by Jonathan Rankine was modelled on Temple Church in London and presents a relatively modest Renaissance Revival frontage to the street. The Former Union Church Elsternwick (1888–1890) is another unusual boom style church in the Scottish Baronial style. Another large religious building from the land boom period which didn't have its spires completed is St Mary Star of the Sea in West Melbourne (1891–1900). The Auburn Uniting Church Complex (1890) in Hawthorn is a stunning polychromatic brick building in the Lombardic Romanesque popularised by the Uniting Church in the city.

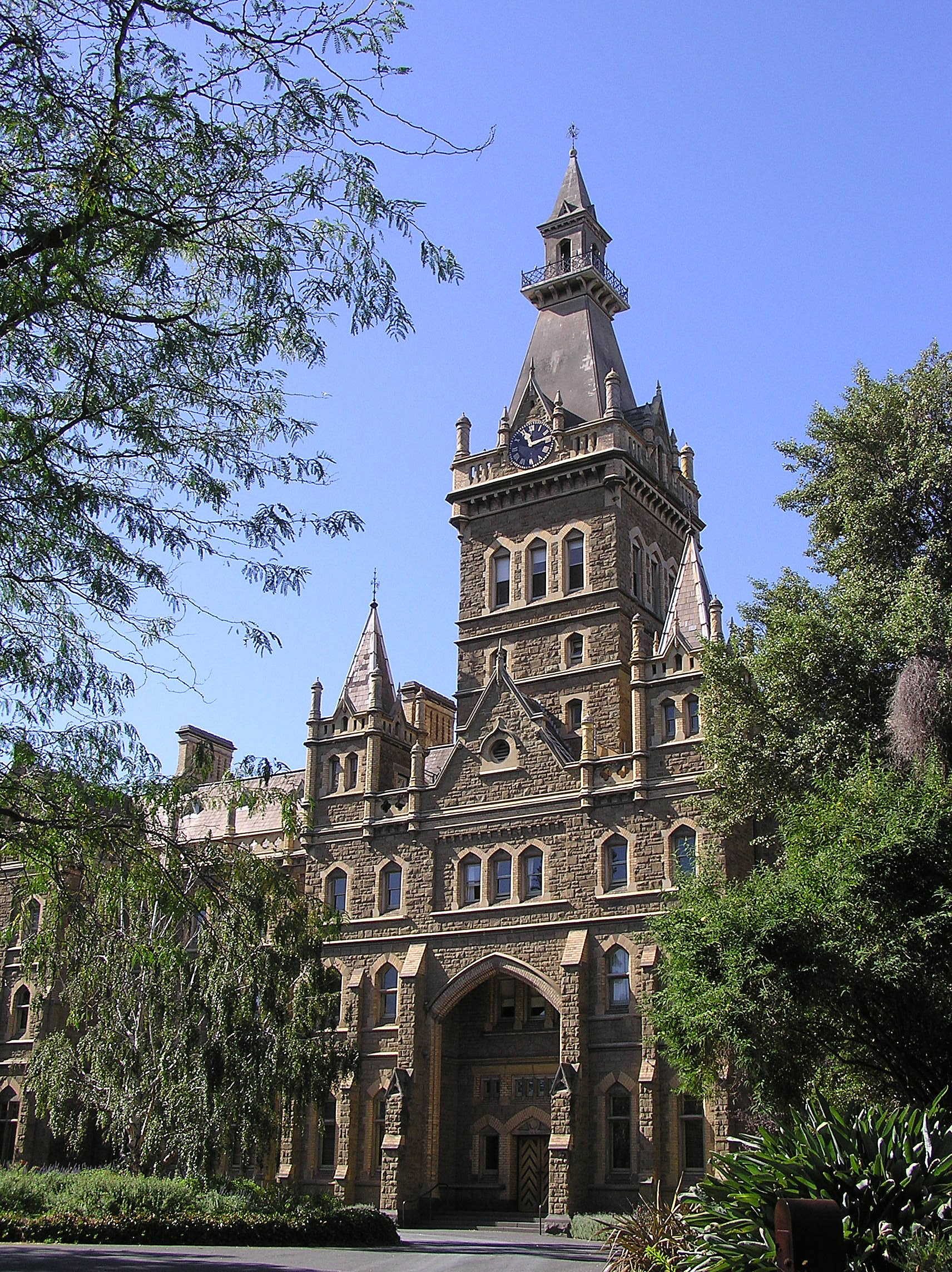
Ormond College by Joseph Reed completed 1881 was a major education landmark of the land boom era

Construction of primary schools continued across the city in a wider variety of styles, designed by the Public Works Department now headed by Bastow. Some of this notable work included St Kilda Park Primary (1882), North Melbourne (1882), Carlton Gardens Primary School (1884), Malvern Primary School (1884), City Road, South Melbourne (1884–1885), Middle Park Primary (1887), Yarra Primary School in Richmond (1888), and Auburn Primary School (1890). Significant education buildings by other architects included the Old Pathology Building University of Melbourne (1885), Francis Ormond Building (1885–1887), Former Melbourne Veterinary College (1886), Armadale Primary School (1886), Baldwin Spencer Building Melbourne University (1888), Former Melbourne Teachers College (1888), the University Old Physics Conference Room and Gallery (1888–1889), Lowther Hall Anglican Grammar (1890), Working Men's College – RMIT Building No. 4 (1890), and the Genazzano FCJ College (1890–1891). The former Priory Ladies' School Boarding House (1890) in Alma Road, St Kilda, demonstrated a rare shift away from the gothic idiom to the American Romanesque, following a visit by Edward George Kilburn to the United States and Europe.

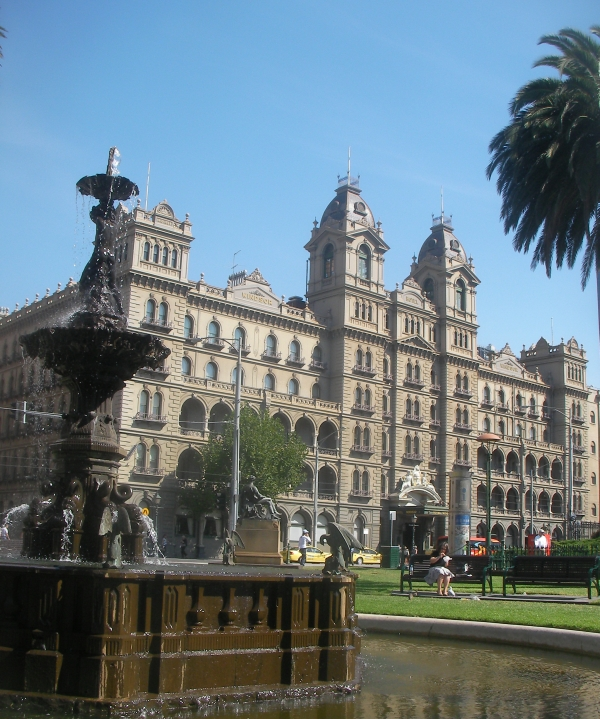
The grand luxury 1884 Windsor Hotel on Spring Street is the most significant surviving example from Melbourne's popular temperance movement

Many palatial hotels emerged during the period including a strong temperance movement and many coffee palaces constructed. These almost always featured heavy ornament and prominent towers, often in the Second Empire or Italianate styles. The largest of these, the Federal Coffee Palace, was demolished in 1973. Melbourne's other Victorian luxury hotel, The Menzies, which peaked in 1896, was also demolished in 1969. The best known survivor is the Hotel Windsor (1884) designed by Charles Webb and extended in 1888 as the Grand Coffee Palace. Other suburban examples include the Biltmore (former Albert Park Coffee Palace) (1887–1889), Hotel Victoria (1888) in Albert Park designed by Richard Speight, Canterbury Mansions (1889) and the George Hotel St Kilda (1880–1890).

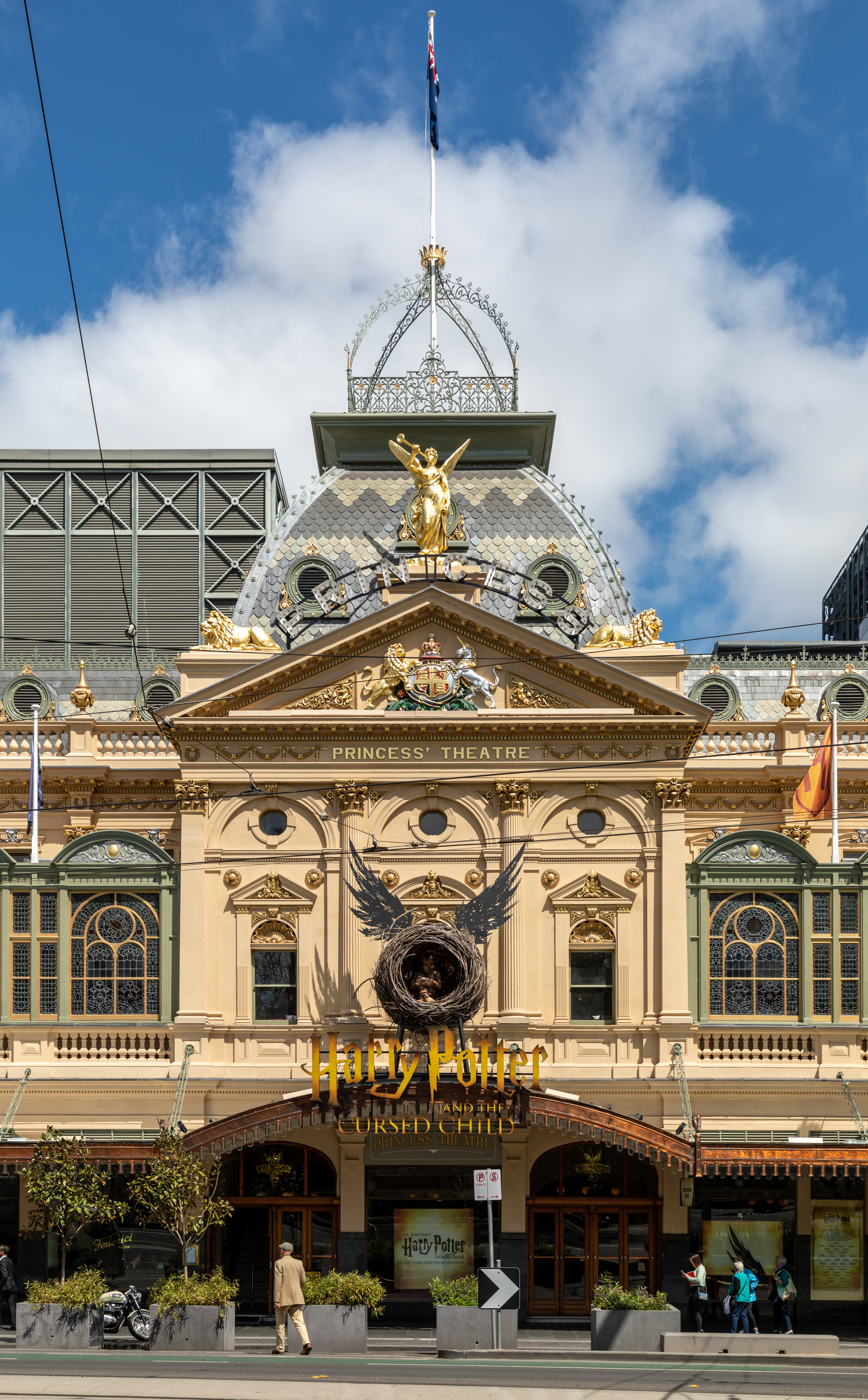
Princess Theatre, the William Pitt 1886 designed theatre is the most significant of Melbourne's once thriving Victorian era scene

Theatres became fashionable entertainment for the wealthy. While many of the city's earlier grand theatres are now demolished including the Royal and Bijou, some of the grandest from the boom era remain. William Pitt was a prominent theatre architect of the time. He designed one of Melbourne's best known theatre buildings, Princess Theatre (1886) in the Second Empire French style. The theatre is full of ornamental flourishes including domed mansard roof detailed cast iron work and gold-plated statuary. Other prominent theatres to survive include Nahum Barnet's Her Majesty's Theatre (1886) in a similar style though now missing its mansard roof.

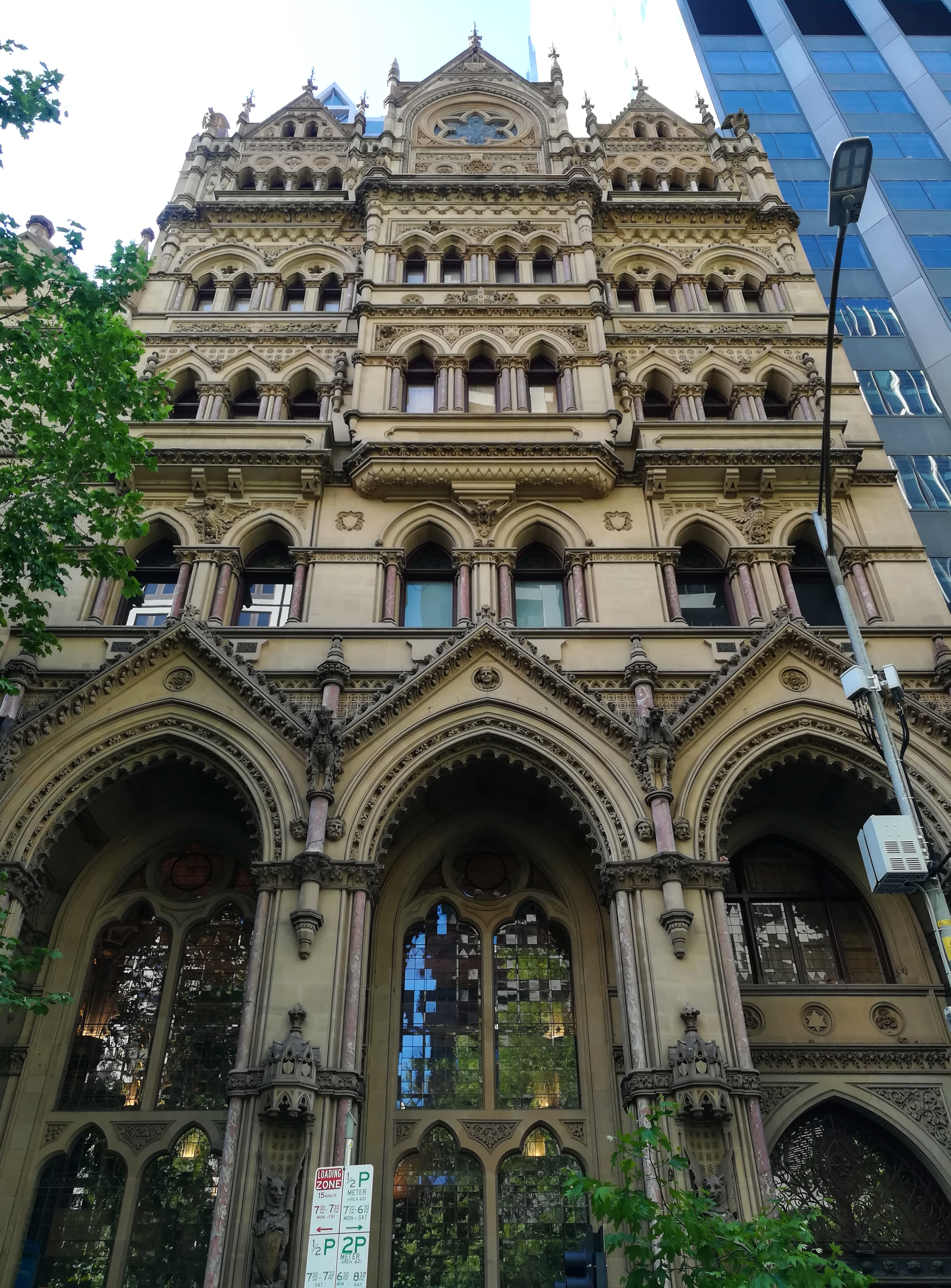
Melbourne Stock Exchange (1887), one of a number of tall elaborate commercial gothic revival buildings surviving near the intersection of Collins and Queen Street

The land boom changed Melbourne's skyline, becoming an early skyscraper city and the first in the southern hemisphere to be home to several "lofty piles" as they were often called during the era. With the wealth brought by the gold rush, Melbourne rapidly gained status as a major financial and commercial capital and many large banks and building societies erected impressive buildings. Most of the tall office buildings constructed during the 1880s boom have been lost (including the prominent Federal Coffee Palace and APA Building). Many other fine examples still stand today, most notably the collection of commercial gothic buildings on the corner of Collins and Queen Streets including the Australia & New Zealand Bank building known as the Gothic Bank (1883) due to its distinctive Venetian Gothic design by William Wardell as well its William Pitt designed neighbouring Old Stock Exchange (1887) and Safe Deposit building (1889). Other surviving tall towers include Lombard Building (1889), and Twentyman & Askew's 'high-rise' Stalbridge Chambers (1890). Smaller office buildings were also often elaborate. Elleker and Kilburn's Melbourne City Building (1888) is an unusual early Queen Anne design which forms a pair with the towered Colonial Bank Hotel (1888) across Balcombe Place. William Pitt's vertical gothic styled Olderfleet Buildings (1888) the first commercial gothic office building listed with the National Trust, New Zealand Chambers (1888), Record Chambers (1887), Charles D'Ebro's Queen Anne styled Winfield Building (1891) and William Pitt's highly detailed gothic revival Rialto Building (1888) with their paired towers belong to what is now known as the Rialto Group of Buildings and feature some of the most elaborate commercial gothic revival in Australia. The Nahum Barnet designed Austral Buildings (1890) continues the red brick Queen Anne theme. Renaissance Revival of the gold rush period continued to be popular even with the larger banks and societies from the Smith and Johnson designed Melbourne Savage Club building (1884–1885) to the six storey Former Money Order Post Office (1890). However academic classicism was often seen as too restrained for the boom style and architects sometimes gave them a more baroque flavour, as in Sum Kum Lee at Chinatown (1887–1888) by George De Lacy Evans and William Salway's design for the Collins Street Mercantile Bank (1888). Suburban offices, while rare, also took similar forms. Notable examples include the ES&A Bank in Hawthorn East (1885) with its unusual step gable gothic form combined with a slate roof. Another unusual commercial building is ANZ bank in North Fitzroy (1889), a miniature version of the now demolished Australian Building. The Kensington Property Exchange (1891–1892) is another heavily ornamented piece of suburban land boom Victoriana with its corner tower. The vaulted Banking Chamber (1891–1893) of the former Commercial Bank of Australia Limited by Lloyd Tayler and Alfred Dunn is one of the most spectacular Renaissance Revival interiors in the city. Another impressive gothic office building is the Wright and Beaver designed Former National Mutual Life Association also known as A. C. Goode House (1891–1893) directly opposite Wardell's gothic bank.

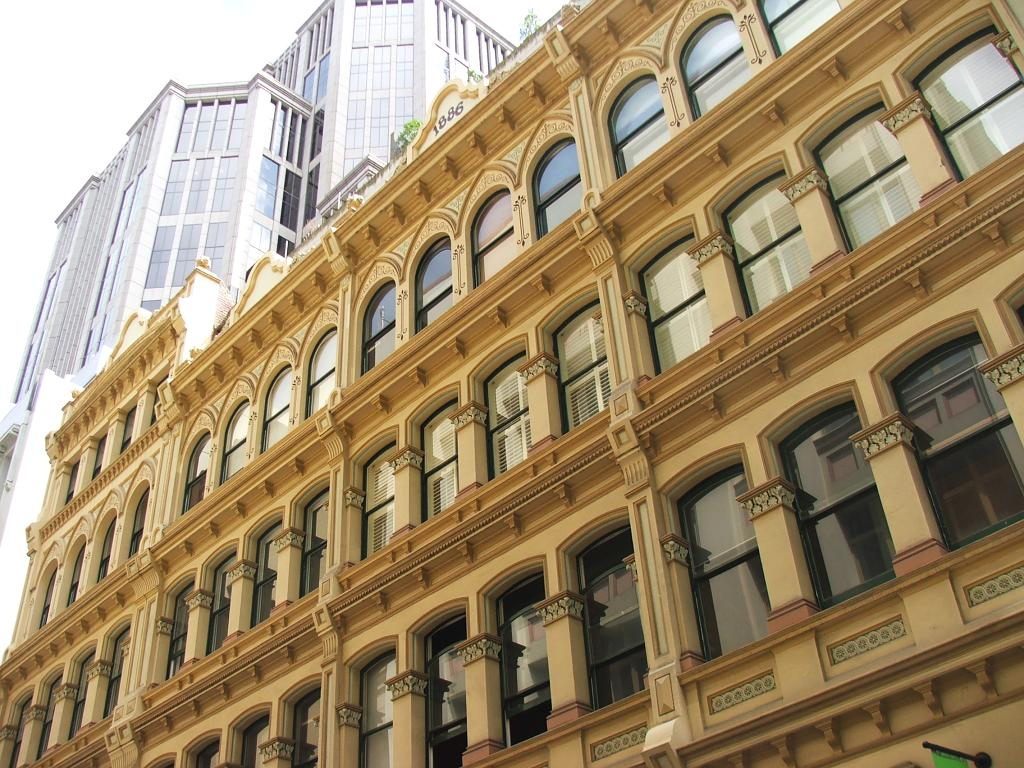
In the 1880s, multi-storey warehouses proliferated in Flinders Lane, giving it a canyon-like appearance. Pictured: Leicester House, built in 1886.

Along with the advancements in rail, Melbourne during the land boom underwent a period of major industrialisation. Flinders Street had benefited from construction of the old docks and turning basin and Flinders Lane in particular was a growing centre for the rag trade. Fitzroy, Collingwood, Richmond, South Melbourne and Port Melbourne emerged as major industrial areas during the period. Among the architectural legacies of the industrial era are many red brick buildings constructed as warehouses. The Cordial Factory in Fitzroy (1882) is a polychrome brick set of warehouses a style which became popular with industrial architects. Leicester House (1886) four storey warehouses on Flinders Lane by T J Crouch incorporates florentine gothic arches in its upper storey and deep cornices into a familiar palazzo design. The distinctive warehouses in Niagara Lane (1887) designed by George De Lacy Evans with their repetitive gables and supply cranes is one of Melbourne's laneway landmarks. and five-storey James Bond Store (1888) is a landmark of the former South Melbourne industrial area. The former is noted for its facade featuring classical details while the latter is noted for its simplicity. Coop's Shot Tower (1889) preserved within the Melbourne Central shopping complex which unlike many more plain buildings incorporates a castellated design and a polychrome factory building at its base. Queen's Warehouse positioned near Victoria Dock (1890) is a landmark red brick warehouse at Docklands. Another industrial landmark of the era is the Former Richmond Power Station (1891) by Charles D'Ebro with its polychromatic brick and Italianate tower.

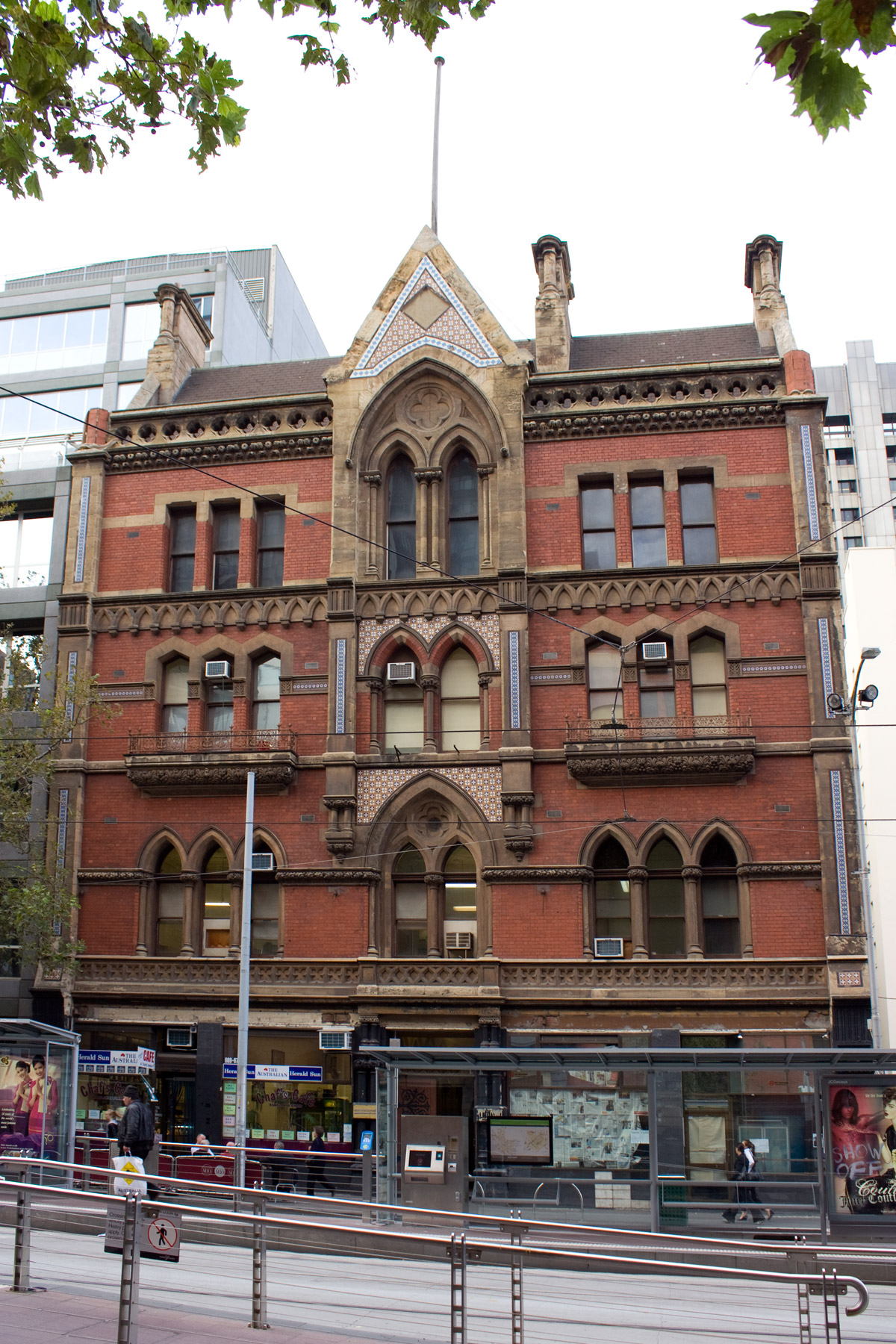
Tram and Omnibus Building, Bourke Street. Completed in 1891

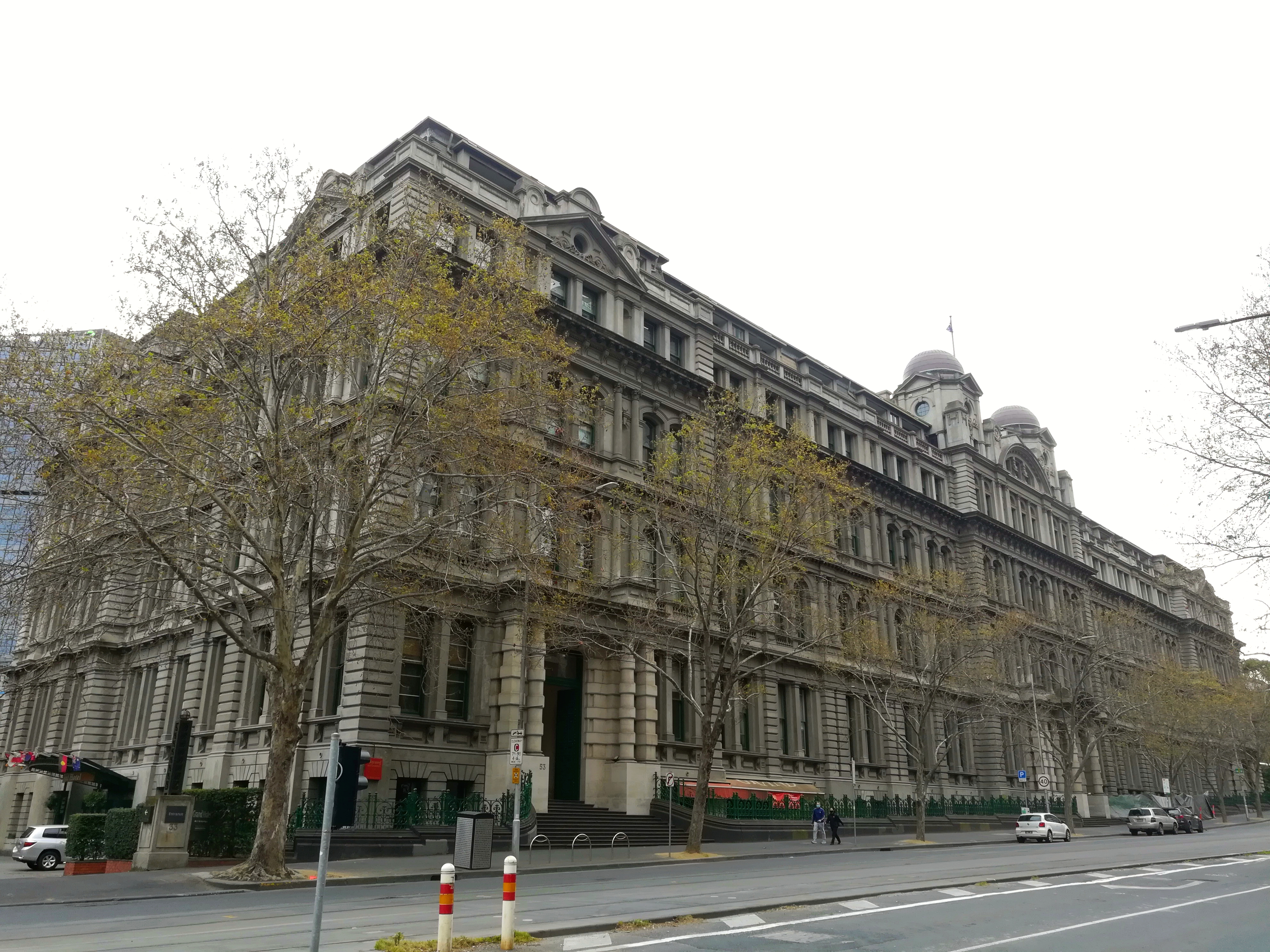
Grand Hotel, 67 Spencer Street, the former head offices of the Victorian Railways, completed in 1893

Melbourne's tram and railway systems boomed during the period, resulting in many significant station and terminus buildings mostly constructed in red brick of the Queen Anne style. These included the former cable tram houses in Fitzroy (1886-1887), Brunswick (1887), Carlton (1889), North Melbourne (1890) and Northcote. The former Melbourne Tramway and Omnibus Building (1891) in the gothic style by Twentyman and Askew is a prominent headquarters for administration of the growing transport system. Much of the railways had been built during earlier periods and many railway lines. Many stations have since been closed or converted to light rail. Nevertheless the land boom saw several impressive new buildings planned. Plans were drawn up for major railway hubs at Spencer Street Station and Flinders Street with an 1882 Spencer Street plan clearly modelled on St Pancras railway station, however in 1883 more restrained neoclassical designs were chosen for both stations but not built, including yet another for Spencer Street in 1892 featuring a massive Italianate complex similar to the current Central railway station, Sydney. Instead funds were diverted to upgrade the suburban network which was experiencing a patronage boom. Prior to the land boom, some examples of High Victorian railway architecture include Hawthorn Railway Station (1882–1889), and Middle Brighton railway station (1882–1887), South Melbourne light rail station (1883) signals the start of the boom's impact on railway building design with its striking Queen Anne design featuring tall chimneys, gable and polychromatic brick. Jewell railway station (1884) one of a template of similar station building designs which proved popular, Windsor Railway Station (1885–1886) a Queen Anne design in polychromatic brick which features Egyptian columns, North Melbourne railway station (1886) which incorporates Victorian Filigree into the design. Newport Railway Workshops (1888) is known as one of the best preserved of its kind in the world with their gabled bays and Italianate clock tower. Perhaps one of the most interesting of the land boom stations is the former Albert Park (now Albert Park light rail station) which features a highly detailed composition of bluestone, polychrome brick, cast iron corinthian columns and vaulted interiors of stained wood. Brighton Beach Railway Station (1889) the main building is another notable polychromatic brick construction featuring high archways and chimneys. Another interesting building is one of the few remaining old buildings in Melbourne Docklands, the No 2 Goods Shed (1889–1890) with its prominent second empire clock tower, and expansive covered railway platform featuring cast iron supports is a testament to the huge industrial impact of the Victorian railways. One of the largest buildings to come out of this era is the former Former Victorian Railways Headquarters on Spencer Street (1893). The expansive Renaissance Revival style building, later modified with an additional storey and distinctive domes, is substantially intact both inside and out.

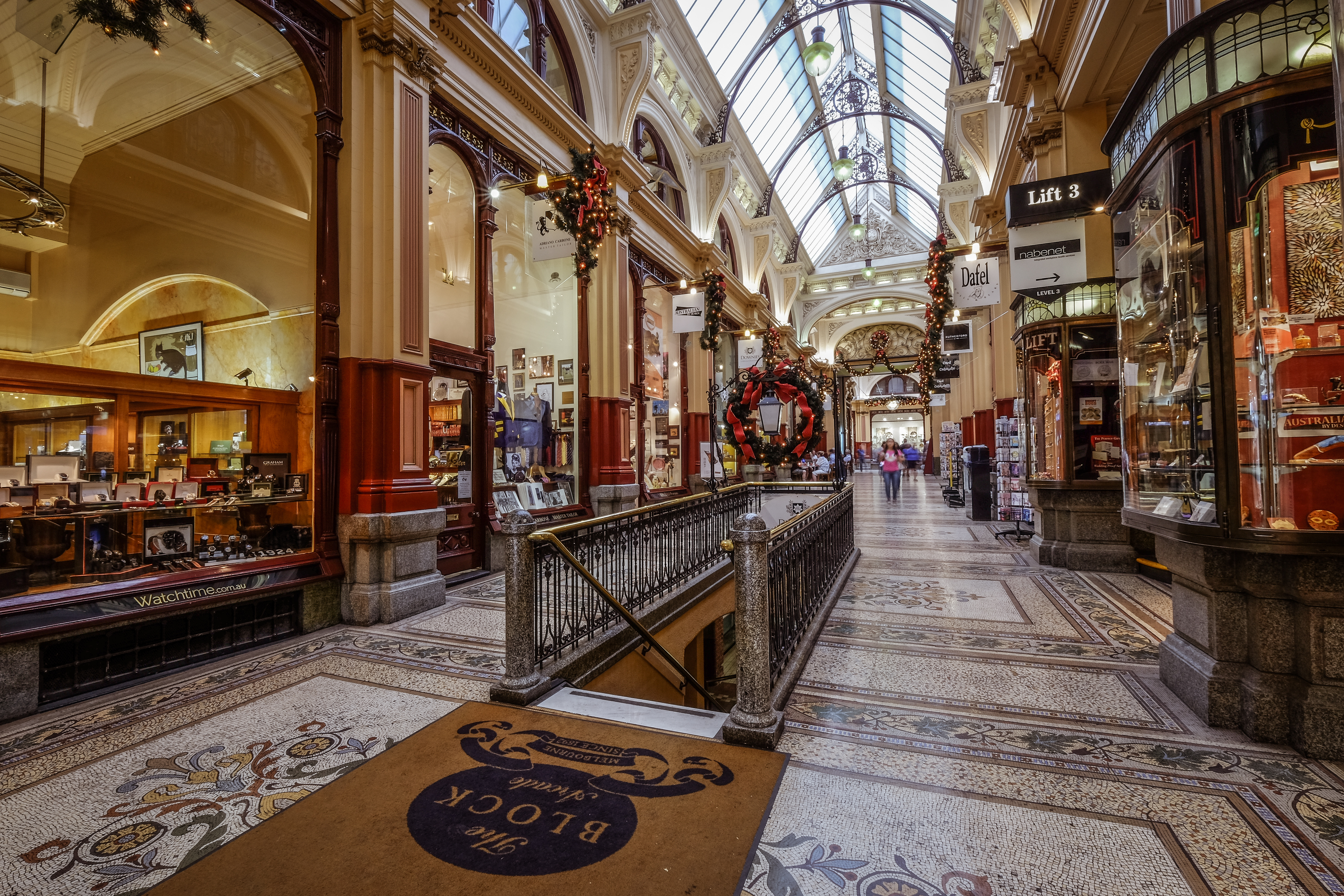
Block Arcade on Collins Street became the most fashionable of the city's many shopping precincts from 1891

The retail sector was also growing exceptionally strongly and major department stores began to emerge centred along the ever expanding tramway network. Arcades and markets proliferated the city, while many have been demolished the most significant survivor is The Block (1891–1893) with its magnificent arcade and baroque facades on Collins and Elizabeth Streets. It became the most fashionable place to shop in the city. The neoclassical inspired facade of Georges Department Store (1884) on Collins Street by John Harry Grainger is an earlier example of early department store architecture. Significant commercial buildings were also being built throughout the inner suburbs including large multi-storey shop buildings in several of the major shopping strips. Numerous boom style buildings, mostly double storey sprang up in the major retail strips such as Chapel Street South Yarra, Prahran, Windsor, Brunswick Street Fitzroy, Smith Street Collingwood and Clarendon Street South Melbourne among others. George de Lacy Evans design for Lygon Buildings (1888) are notable three storey palazzo shopfronts. Those designed by John Beswicke feature striking polychromatic brickwork including Beswicke Buildings in Fitzroy (1888) and 132–142 and 144–148 Victoria Street Auburn (1891). 313–315 Drummond Street Carlton is a particularly striking examples including kangaroo-gryphon gargoyles and polychromatic Florentine gothic arches. One of the largest and most spectacular landmarks, the Melbourne Fish Market (1889) was demolished in 1959 to make way for a carpark and road flyover. Retail arcades and markets were also popular in the suburbs. One of the largest markets from the era is the former Metropolitan Meat Market in North Melbourne (1880). Prahran Arcade on Chapel Street (1890) though missing its original tall mansard roof makes a striking French Second Empire statement to the street. Charles D'Ebro's Prahran Market (1891) is a prominent statement of Anglo-Dutch style with its large arched entry.

GPO, additions including tower (1887)

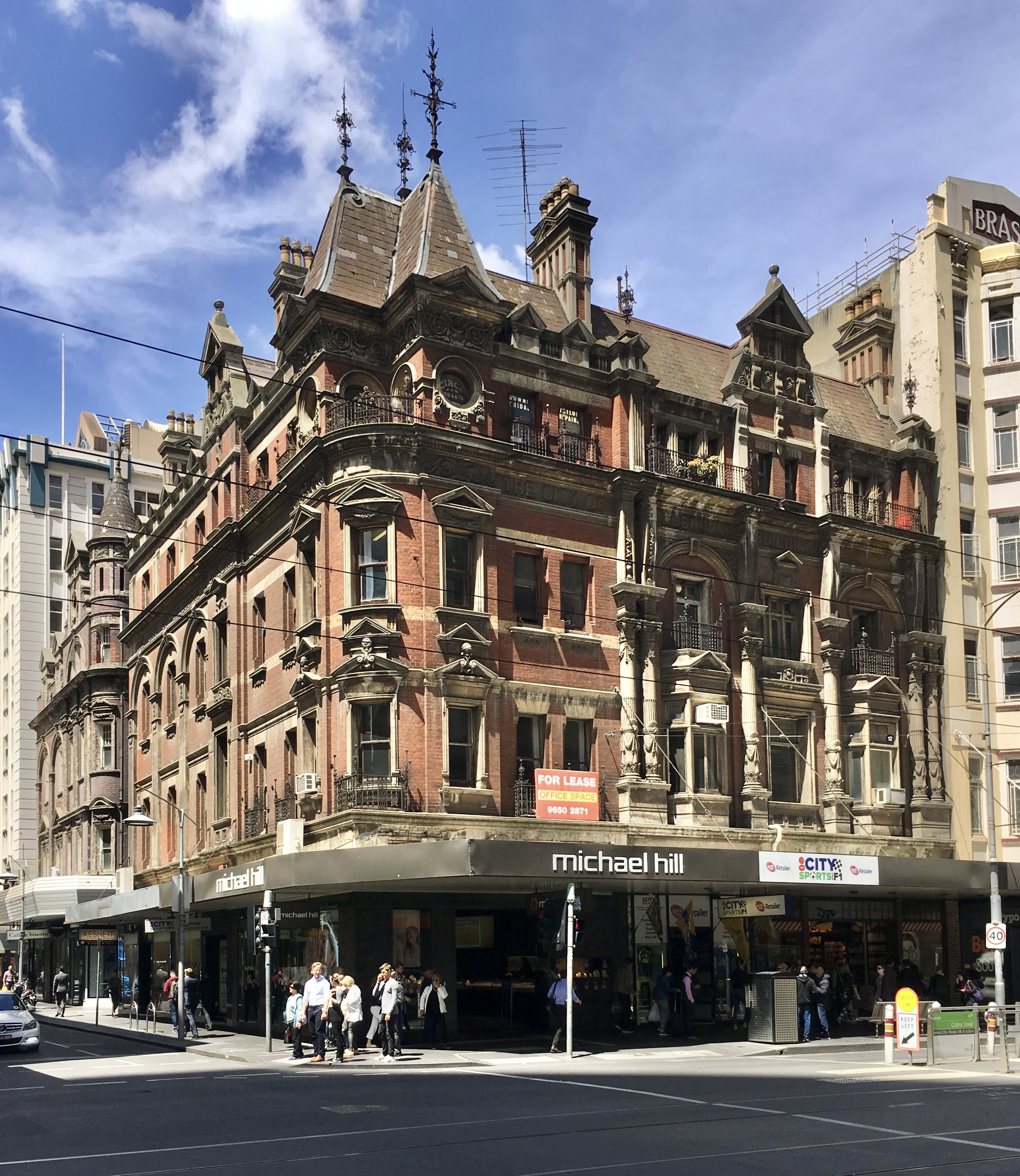
City of Melbourne building (1888)

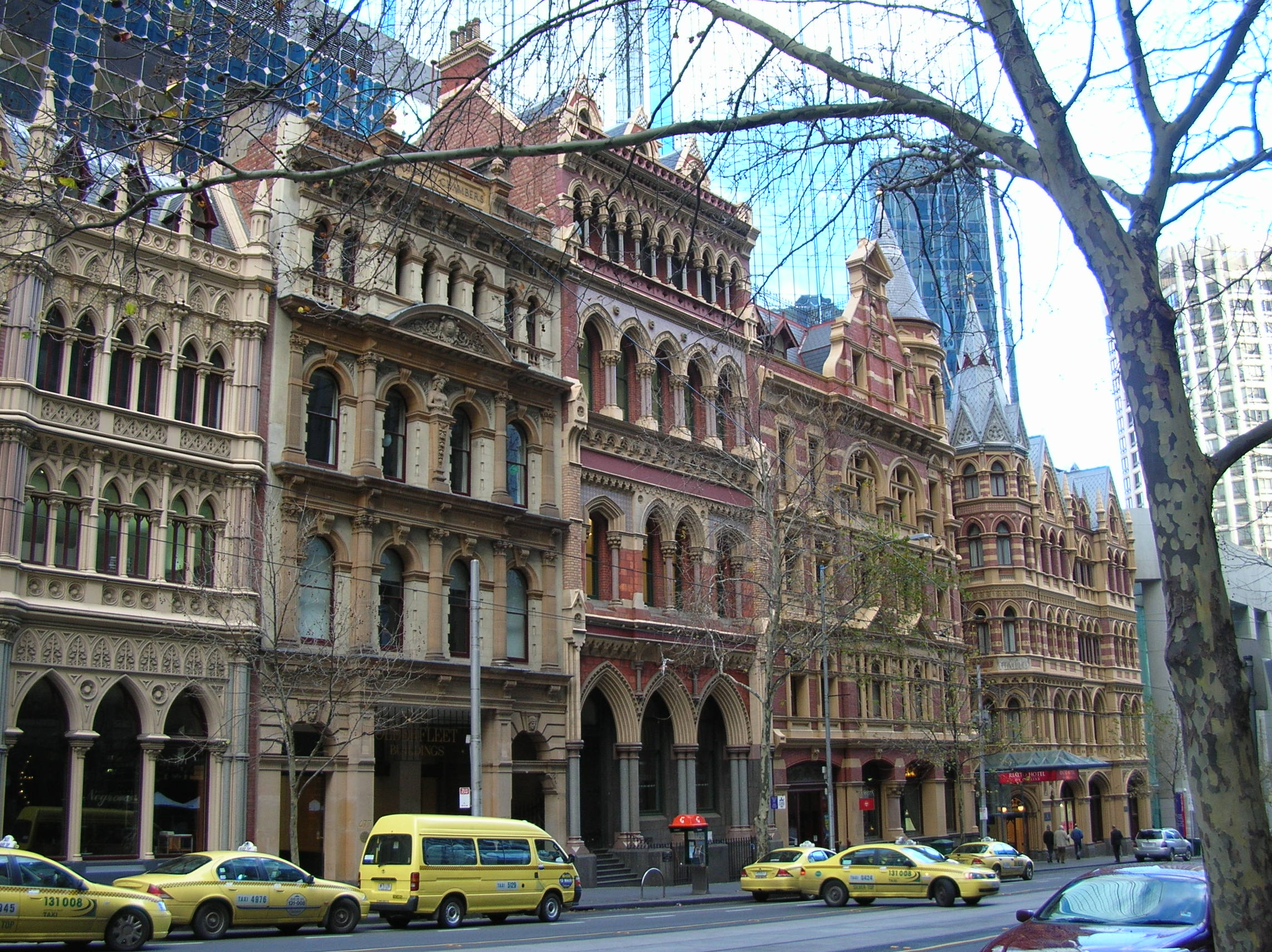
Collins Street buildings including the Rialto (1888), Winfield (1889) and Olderfleet buildings (1889)

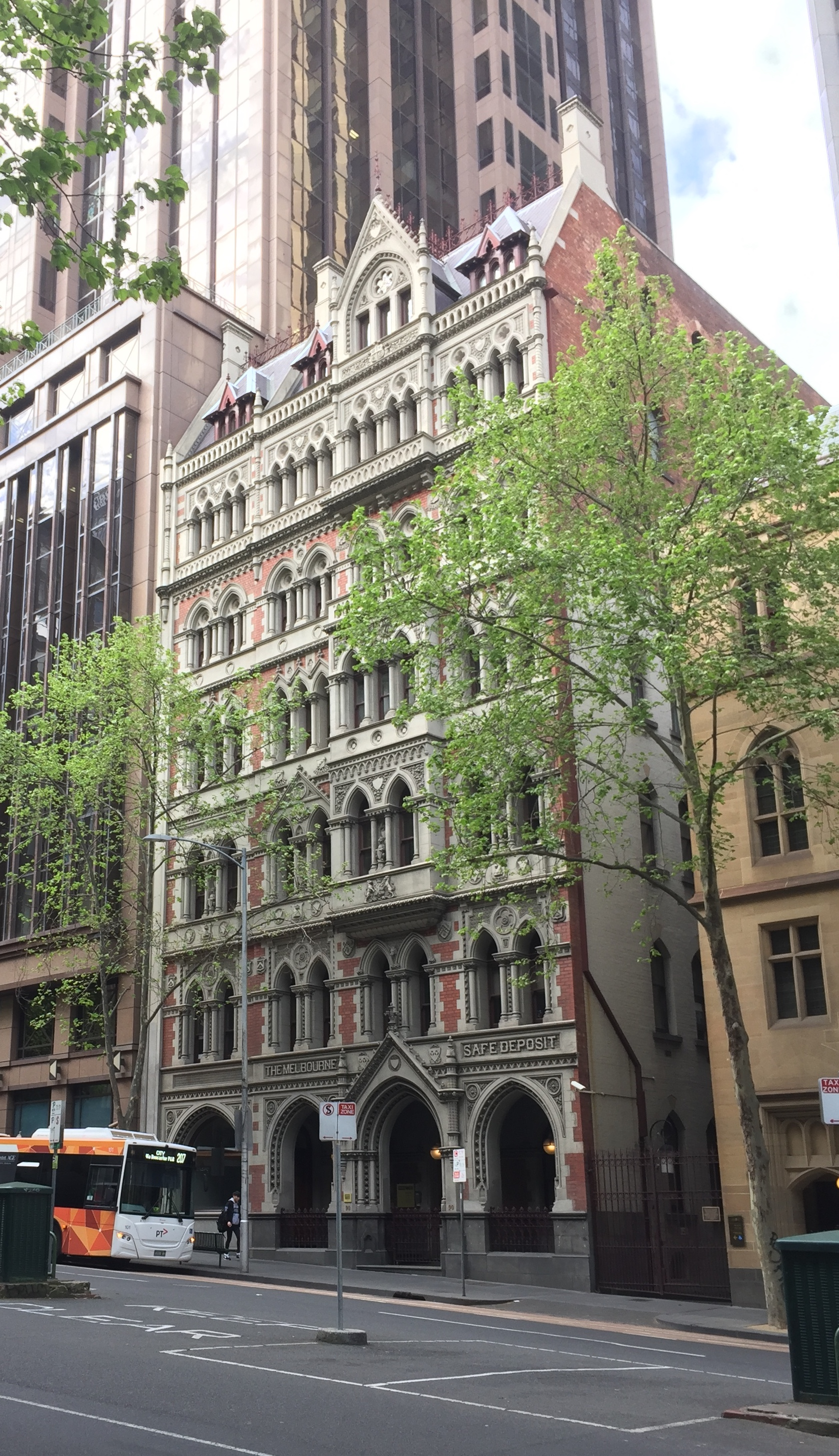
Safe Deposit building (1889)

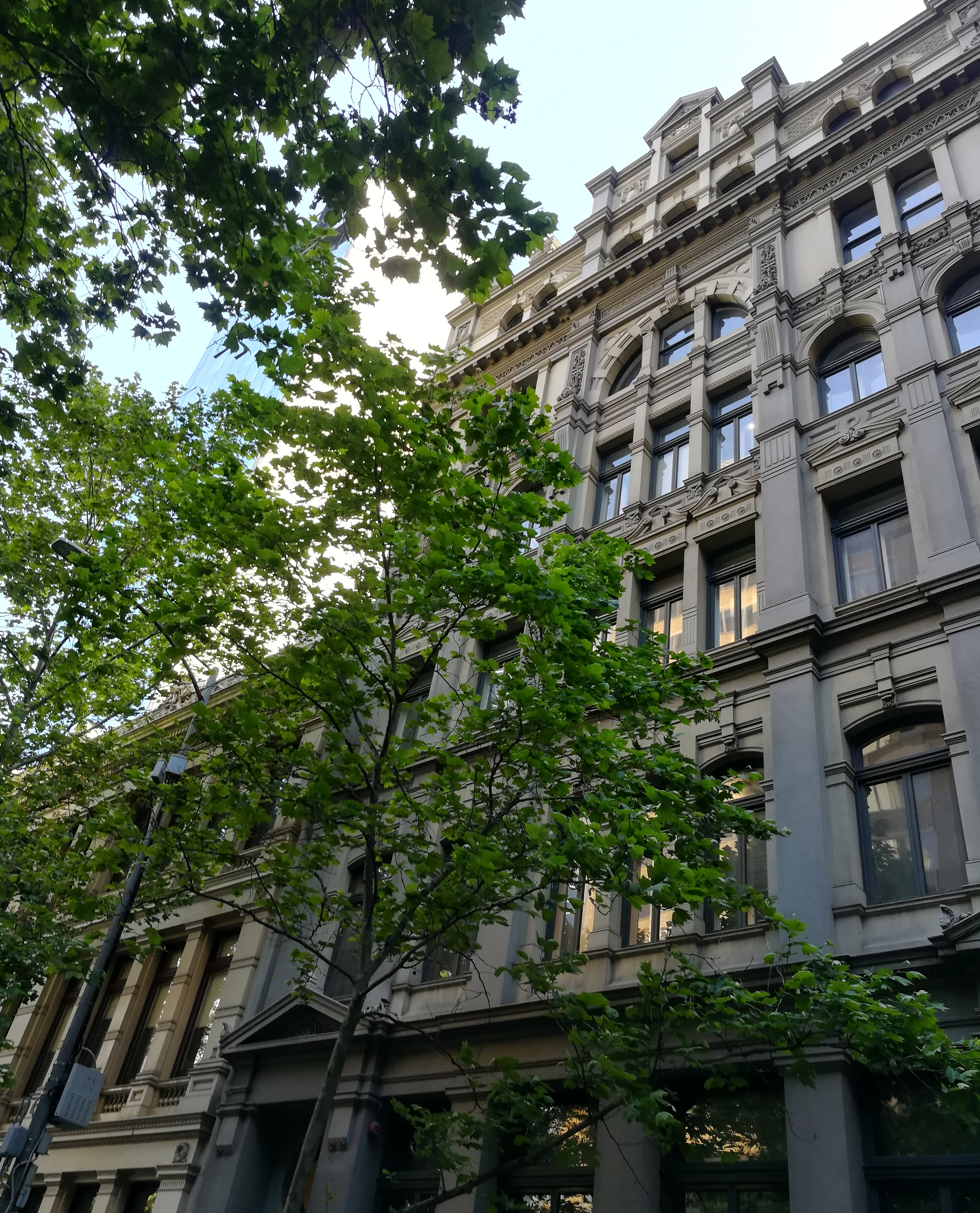
Lombard Building (1889)

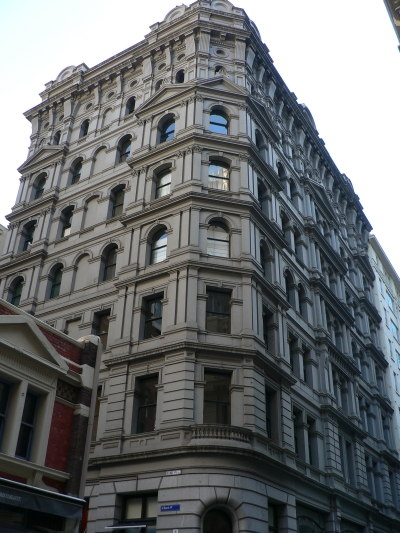
Stalbridge Chambers (1890)

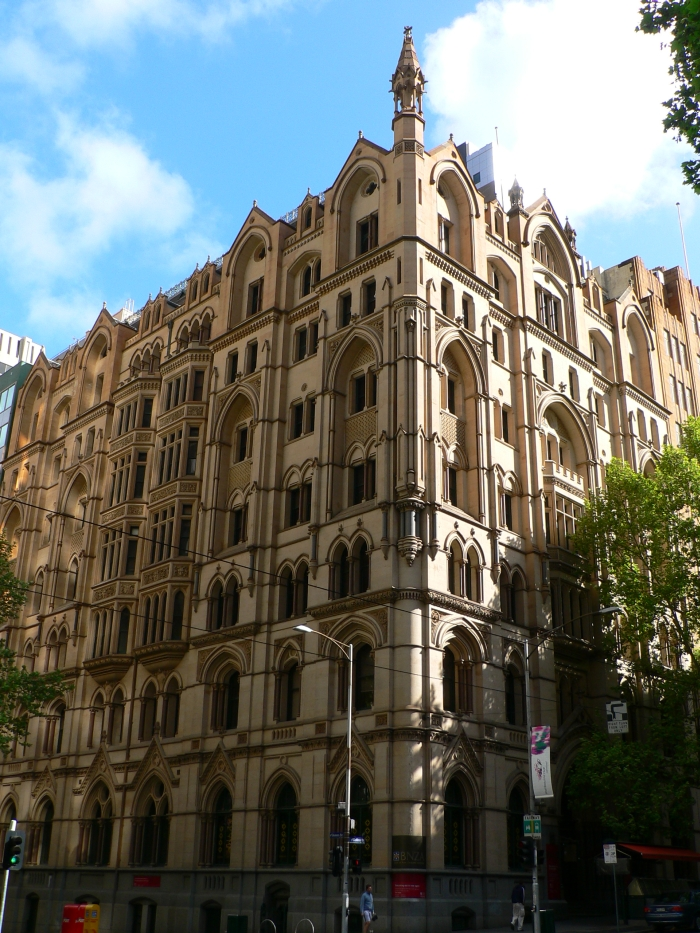
A.C. Goode House (1891)

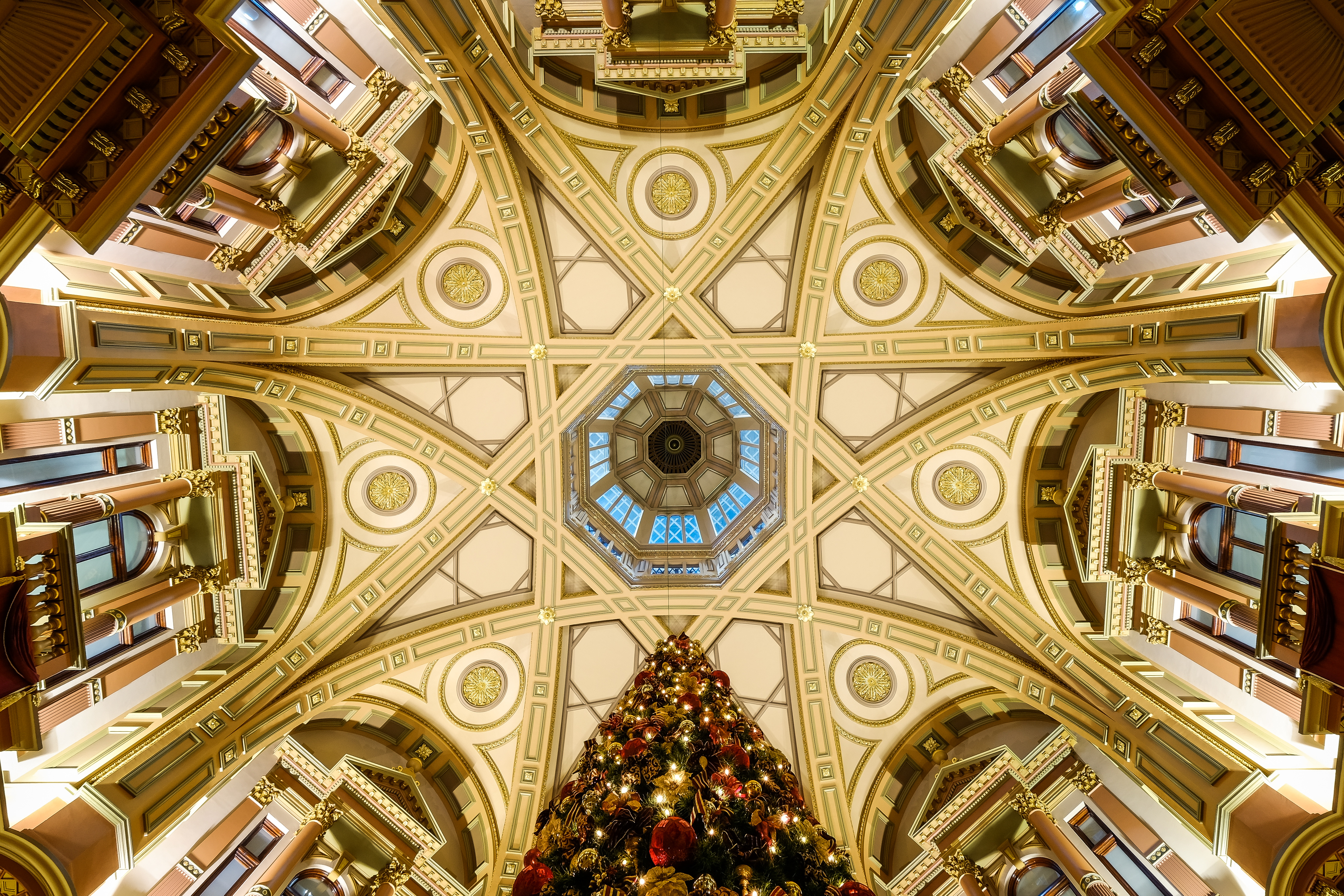
Domed chamber of the Commercial Bank of Australia Limited (1891)

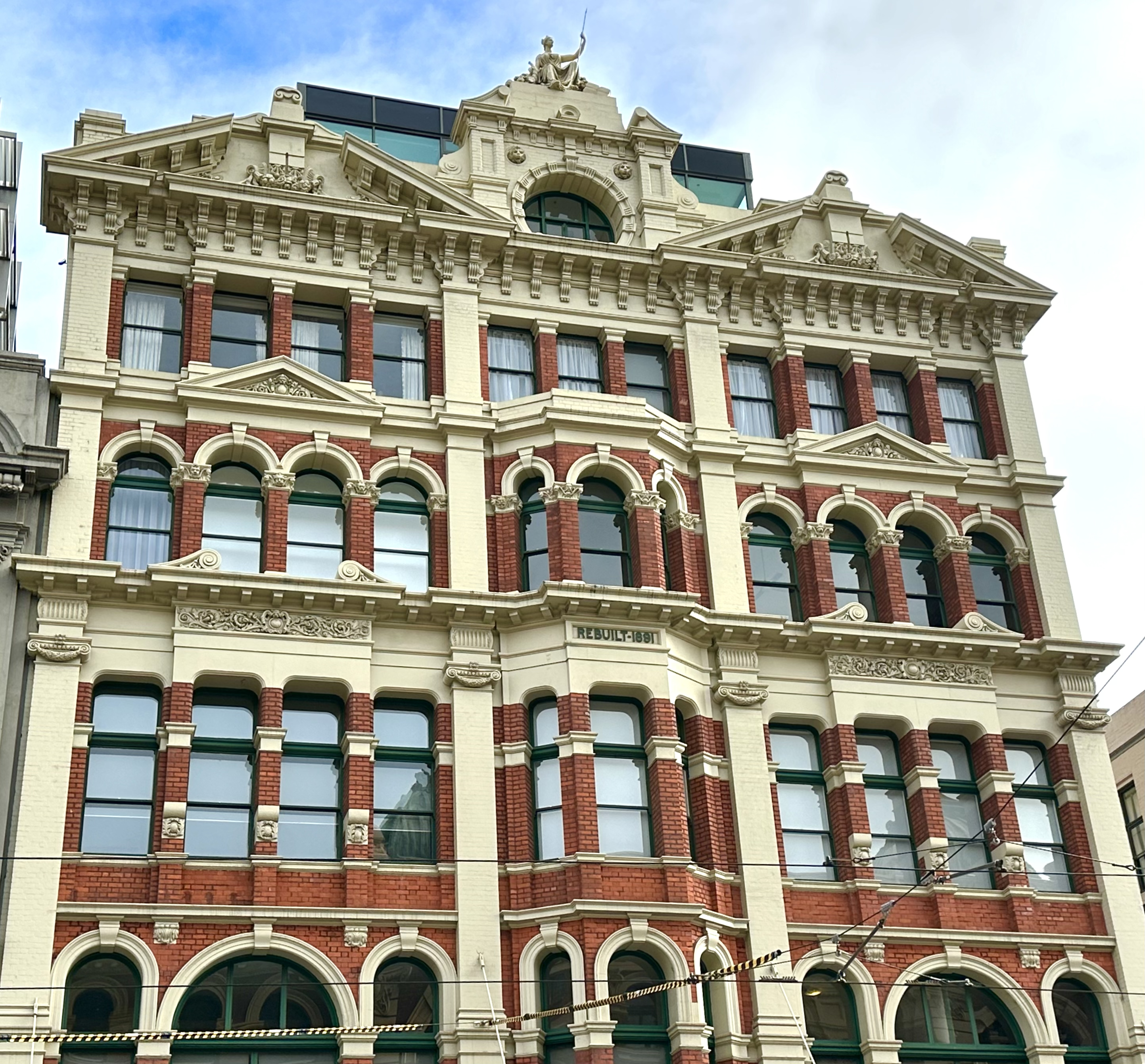
Mutual Store Building (1891)

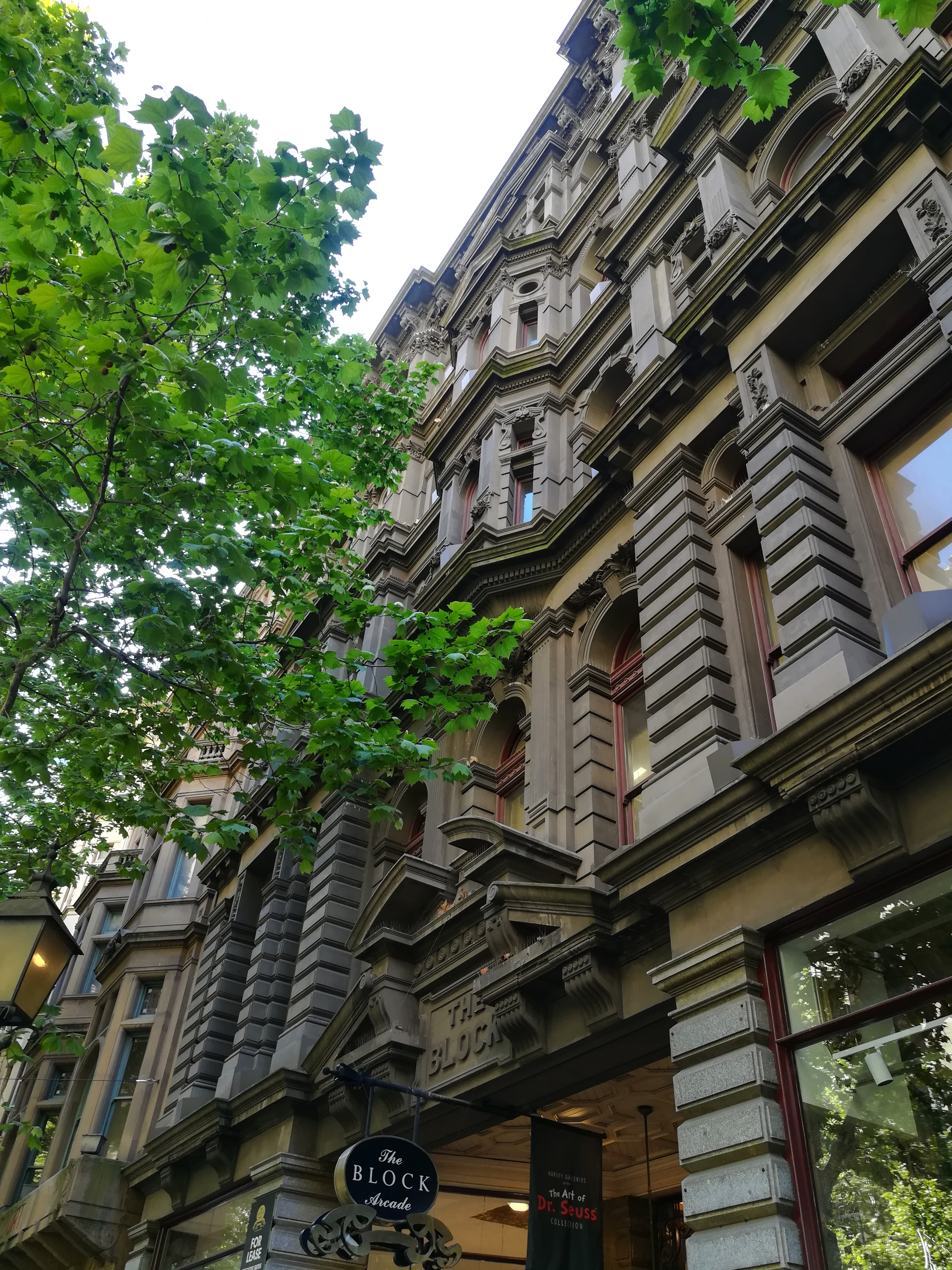
The Block (1891)

=== 1900s–1918: Federation ===
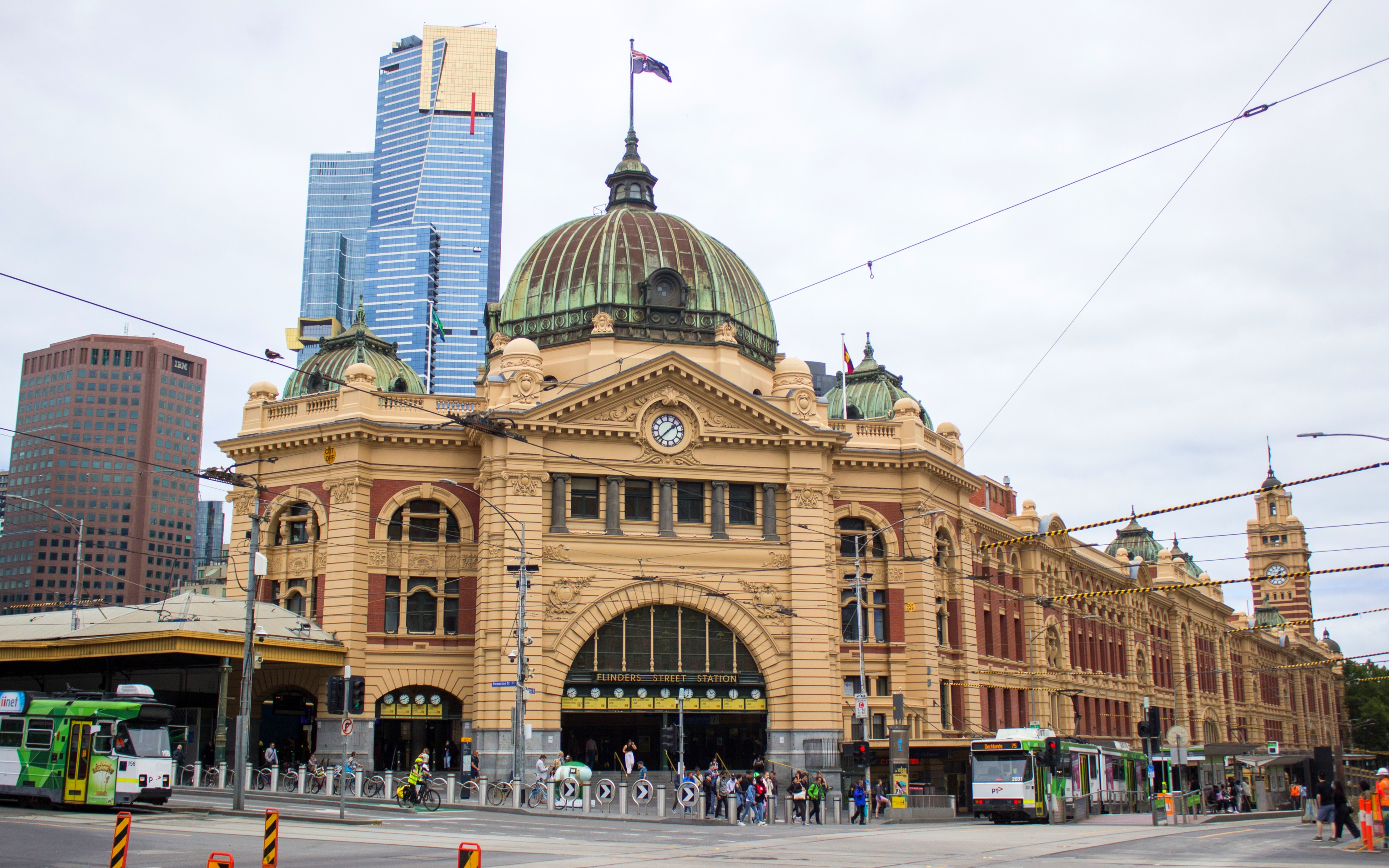
Flinders Street station (1909)

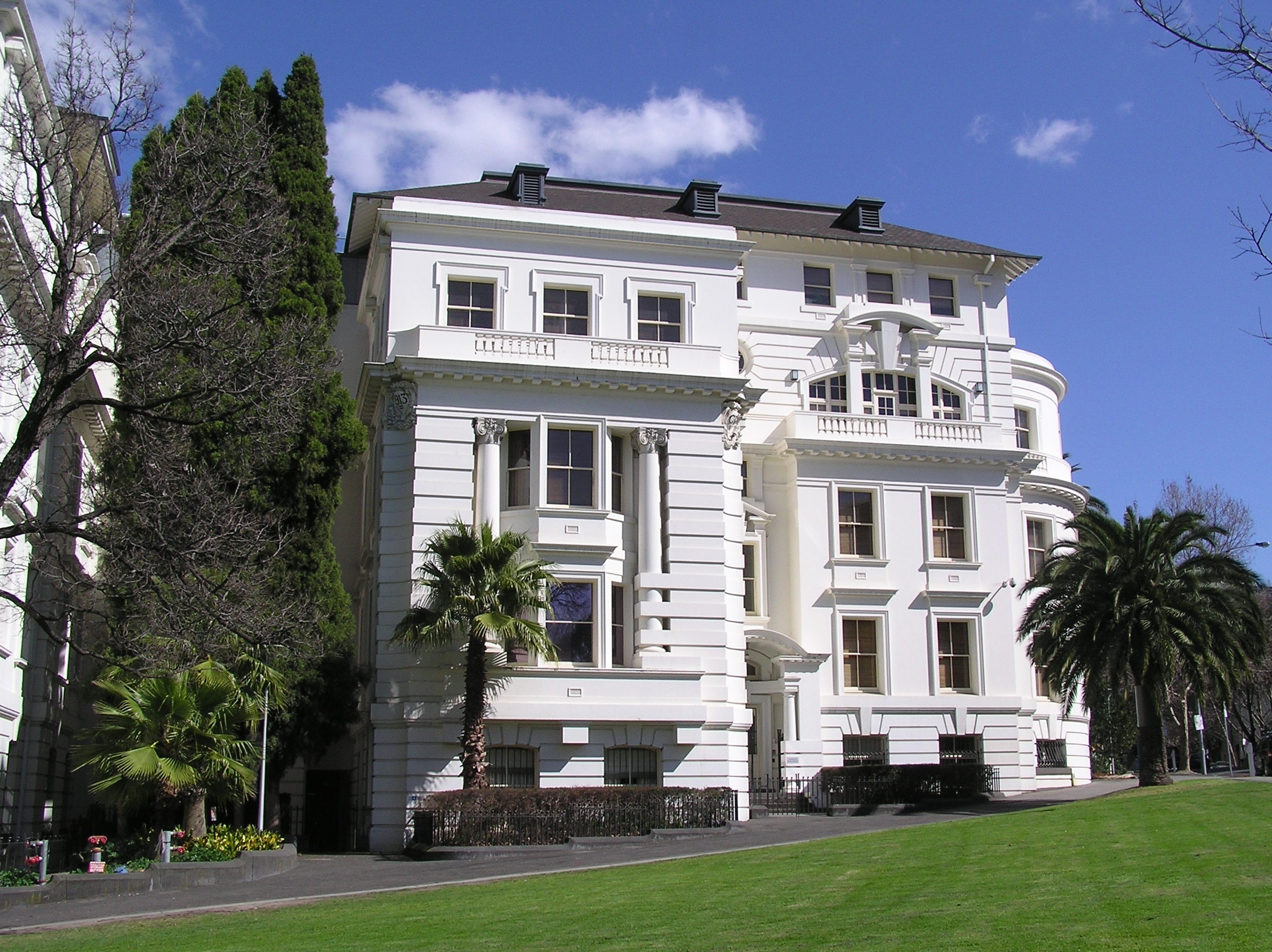
Commonwealth offices at 4 Treasury Place (1911)

The turn of the century in Melbourne marked the Federation of Australia in 1901. The 1880s landboom had been followed by an equally large crash, the collapse of building societies and some banks, and an almost complete halt in construction by 1893. Sydney fared somewhat better, grew faster, and overtook Melbourne in size and population by 1901. Melbourne remained important thanks to its status as Australia's (interim) capital city, the home of the Commonwealth of Australia. The Victorian Parliament House on Spring Street was handed over to house the parliament of Australia, while the Victorian parliament moved to the Exhibition Buildings. Economic revival in the 1900s saw a resurgence of construction. In this period, architects began to look less to England for inspiration, and more to the United States, particularly the Romanesque Revival.

A major landmark of this period was built when it was finally decided to replace the ad hoc collection of train sheds Flinders Street station with a grand terminus. A competition was held in 1899, with seventeen entries received. The competition was essentially for the detailed design of the station building, since the location of the concourse, entrances, the track and platform layout, the type of platform roofing and even the room layout to some extent was already decided. The first prize, at £500, went to railway employees James Fawcett and HPC Ashworth of Fawcett and Ashworth in 1899. Their design, titled Green Light, was of French Renaissance style and included a large dome and tall clock tower. The train shed over the platforms was intended to have many arched roofs running north-south, but this was never built. Over the next few years, the design was altered with an additional floor, and work on the station building itself began in 1905. Ballarat builder Peter Rodger was awarded the £93,000 contract and the station was originally to be clad in stone, but this exceeded the allocated budget. Red brick with cement render was chosen for the Edwardian style building. Work on the dome began the following year, and delayed construction saw a Royal Commission appointed in May 1910. The Way and Works Branch of the Victorian Railways took over the project, the station being essentially finished by mid-1909. The verandah along Flinders Street and the concourse roof and verandah along Swanston Street were not completed until after the official opening in 1910. The building has been repainted five times in its history, and the last repaint occurred in 2017. The most recent paint job was conducted to match the original colours as closely as possible, obtained through numerous samples of chipped paint which revealed the original colours after being cut in a polyester resin tube.

From 1905 there was much debate about the merit of taller buildings in the city centre, and the idea of a height limit, influenced by the City Beautiful movement, gained popularity. There was also a concern to preserve light and air at lower levels, especially in the "little" streets. Eventually, as part of a suite of rules that also ensured fire proof construction, the City of Melbourne passed a bylaw mandating a 40-metre (132 ft) limit. It was (and still is) popularly believed that this was as high as fire ladders could reach, but in fact the longest ladder was 27 metres (87 ft), and the limit was based on proportions, being 1+ 1/3 times the 30-metre (99 ft) main street width. This limit stayed in force until the late 1950s, ensuring an evenness to many built up streets.

Nahum Barnet was one of the most prolific architects during the period, while some of his most fantastic buildings such as the YWCA on Collins Street have been demolished, some of his distinctive Edwardian buildings remain including the landmark Alston's Corner (1903–1904) and the facade of the Former Auditorium (1912) both on Collins Street.

Other notable Federation buildings in Melbourne include Abbotsford Convent (1900–1903), Milton House (1901), City Baths (1903–1904), Empire Building (1903), St Kilda Pavilion (1904), Paton Building (1905), 3 Treasury Place (1906–1907), Dimmey's Department Store (1907–1910), Bryant and May Factory (1909), Queen Victoria Hospital (1910), Malvern tram depot (1910), Commonwealth Offices (1911–12), Luna Park (1912), Commercial Traveller's Association (1913) and Read's Stores (1914).

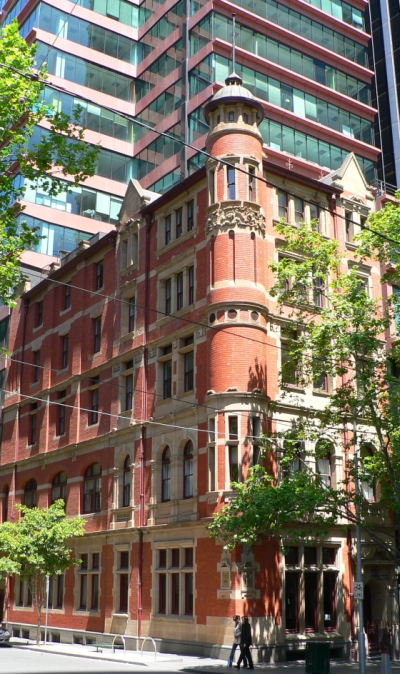
Gollin and Company Building (1902)

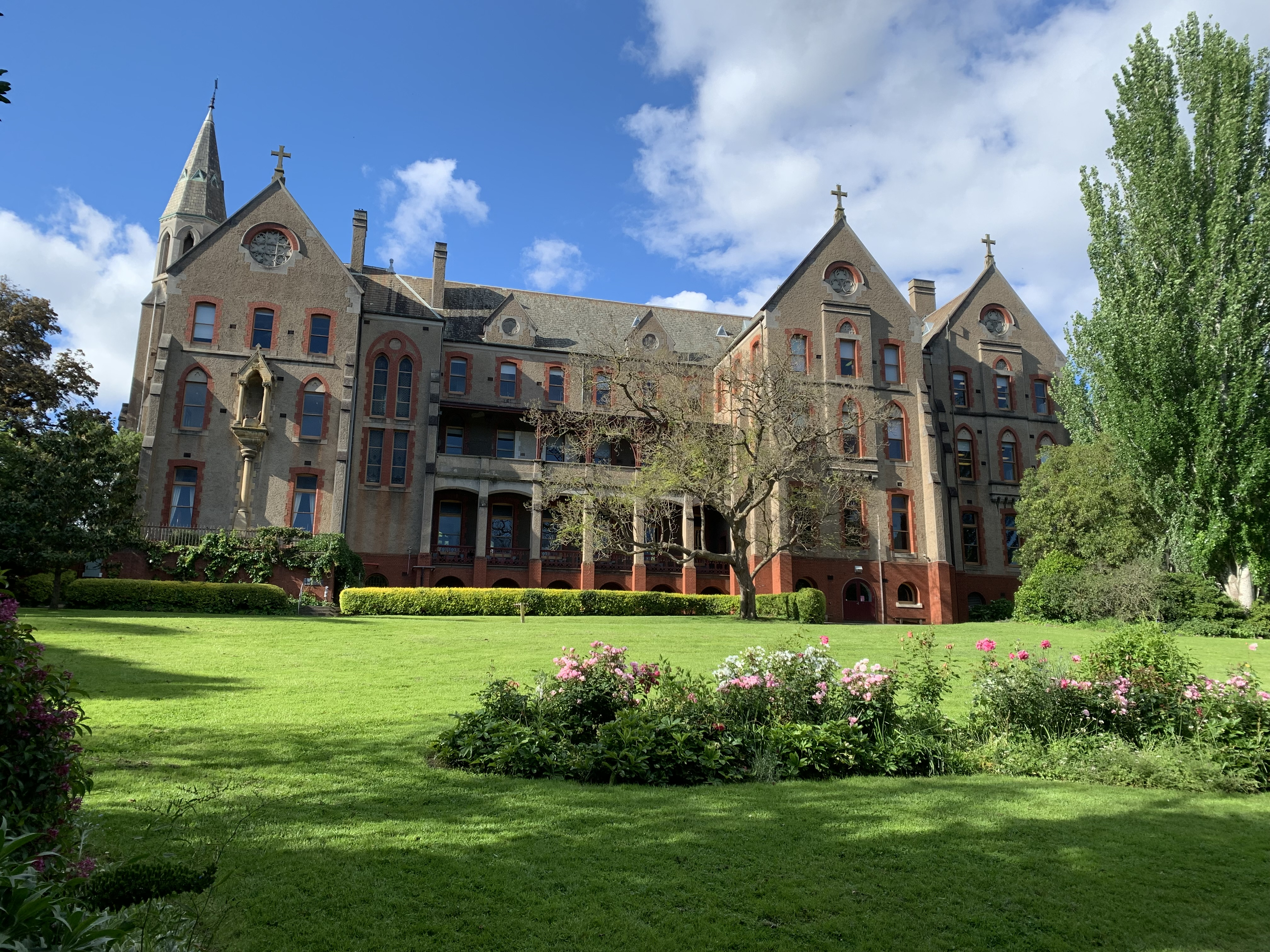
Abbotsford Convent (1903)

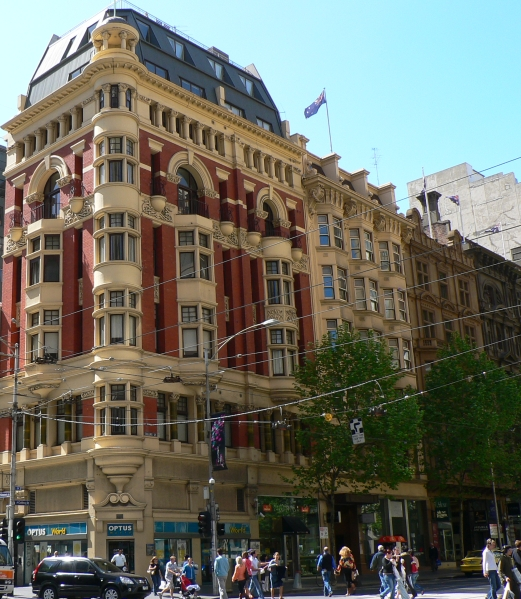
Altson's Corner (1904)

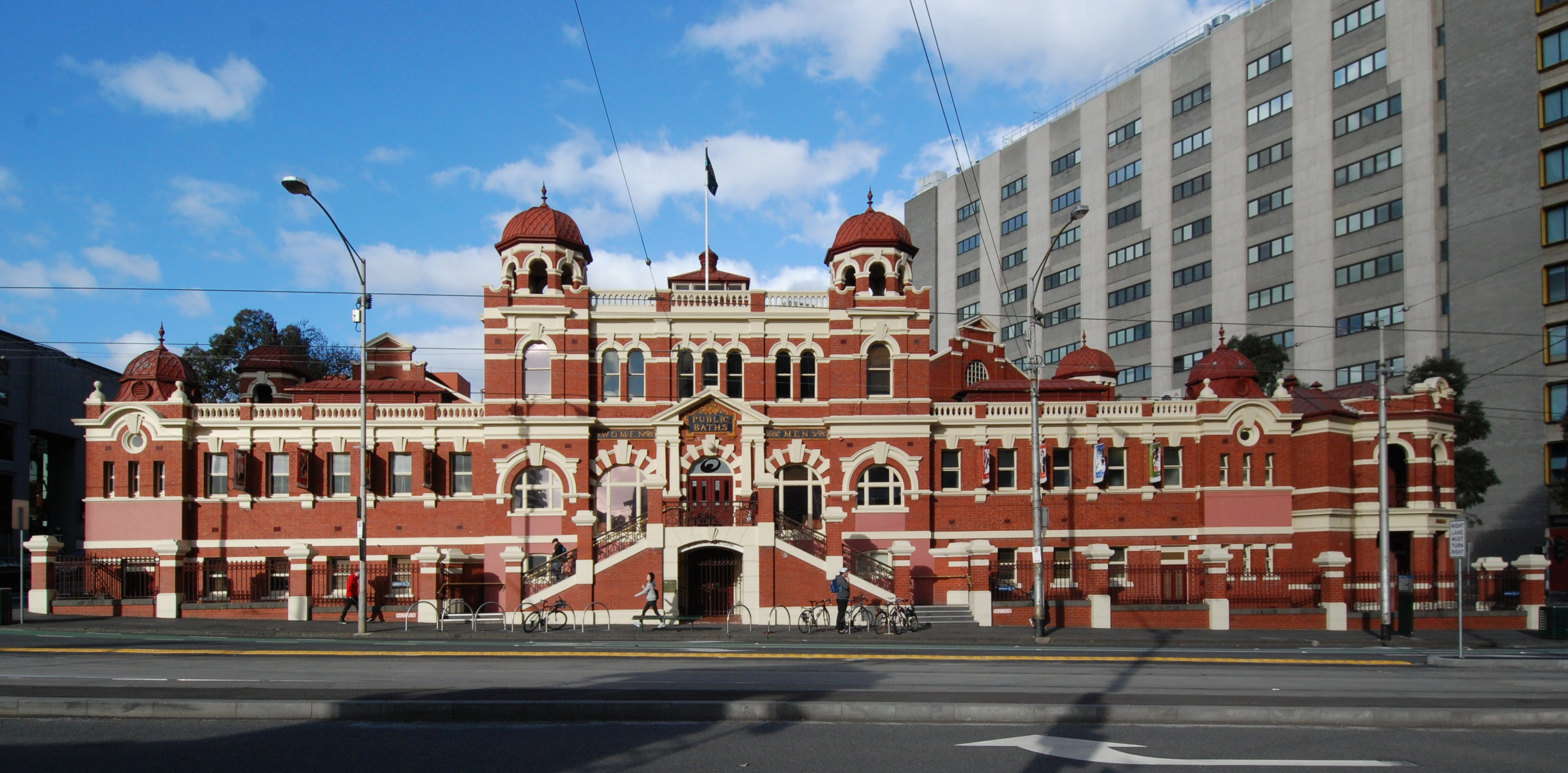
City Baths (1904)

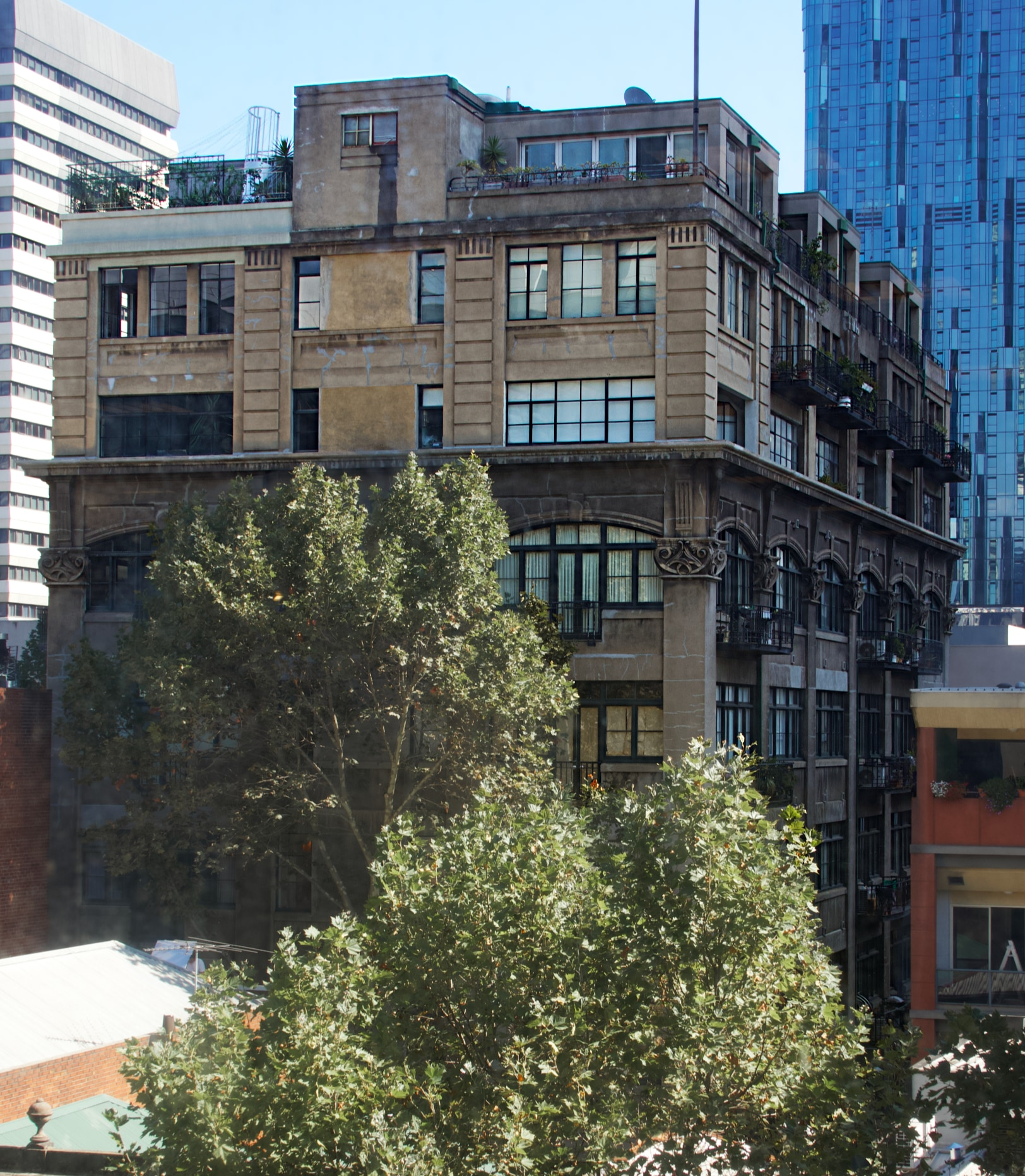
Dovers Building (1908)

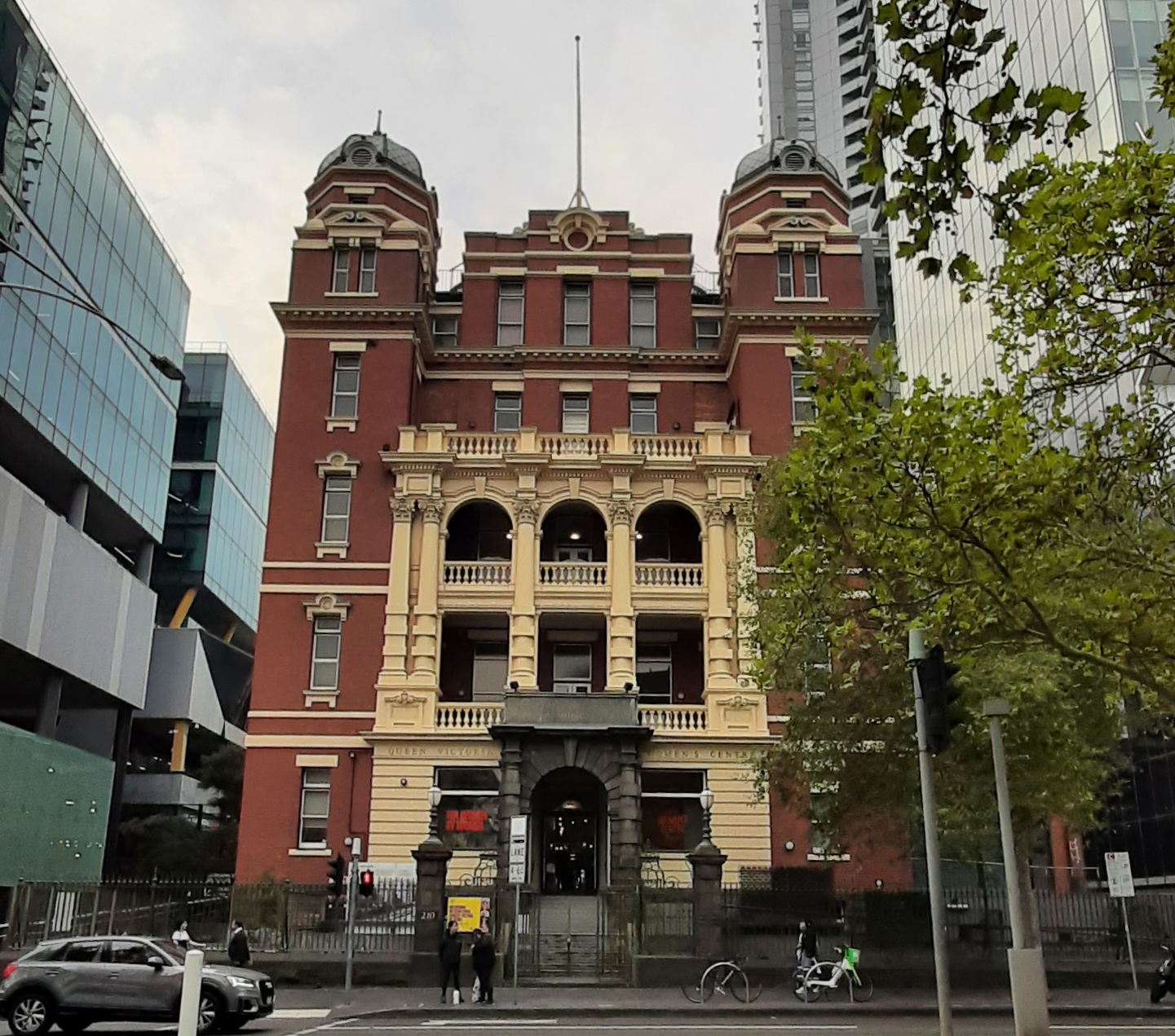
Queen Victoria Hospital Women's Building (1910)

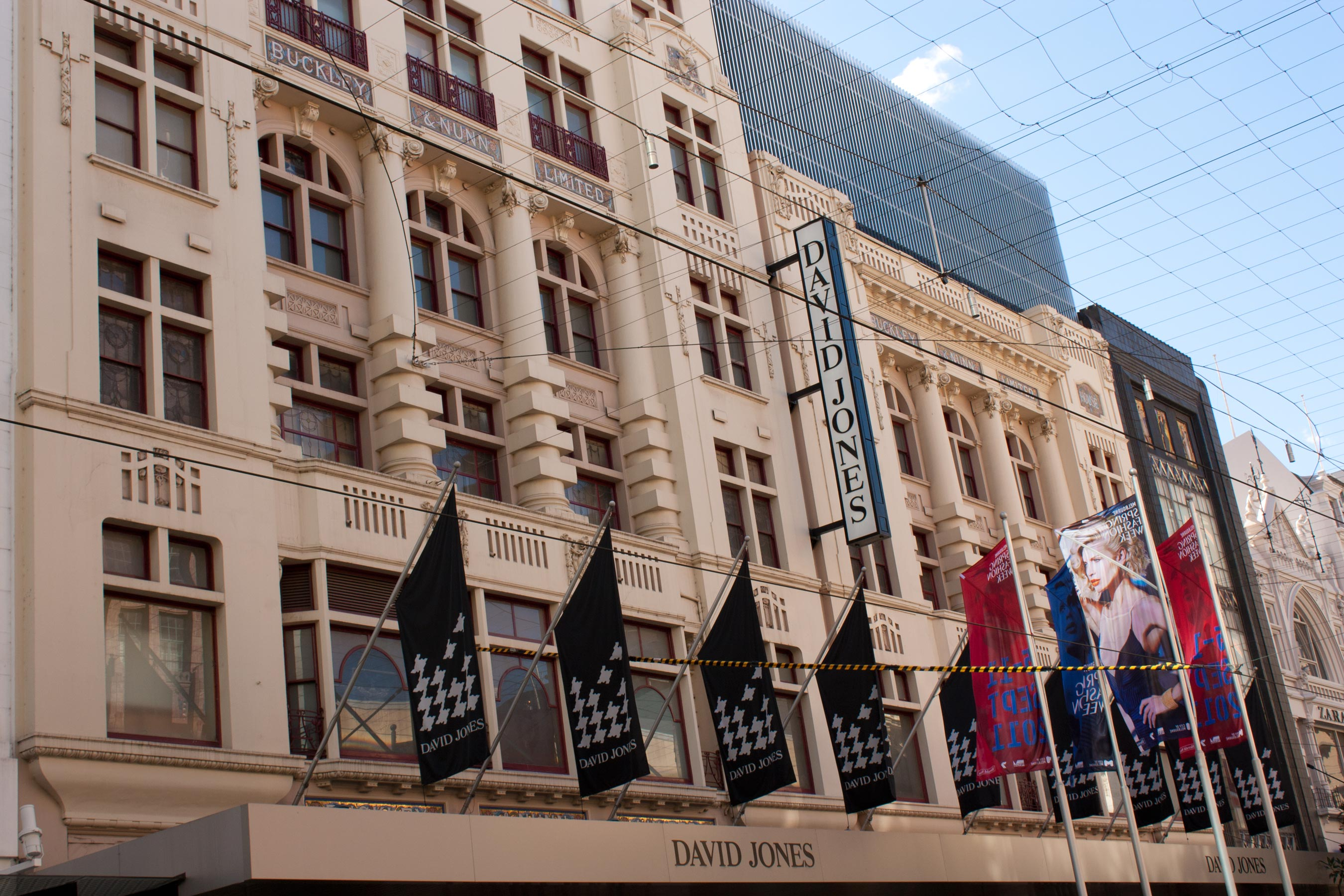
Buckley & Nunn Building (1911)

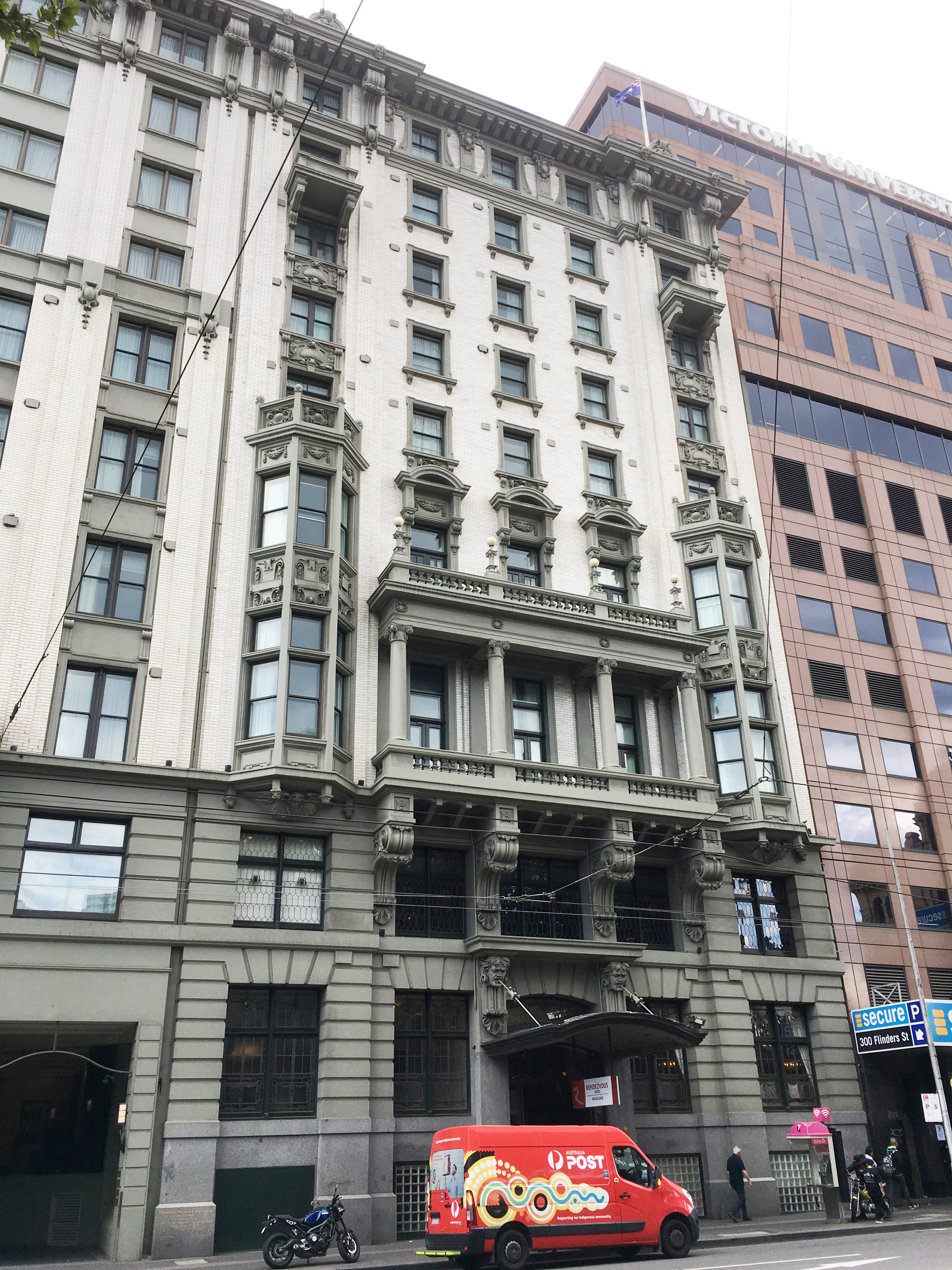
Commercial Traveller's Association buildings (1912)

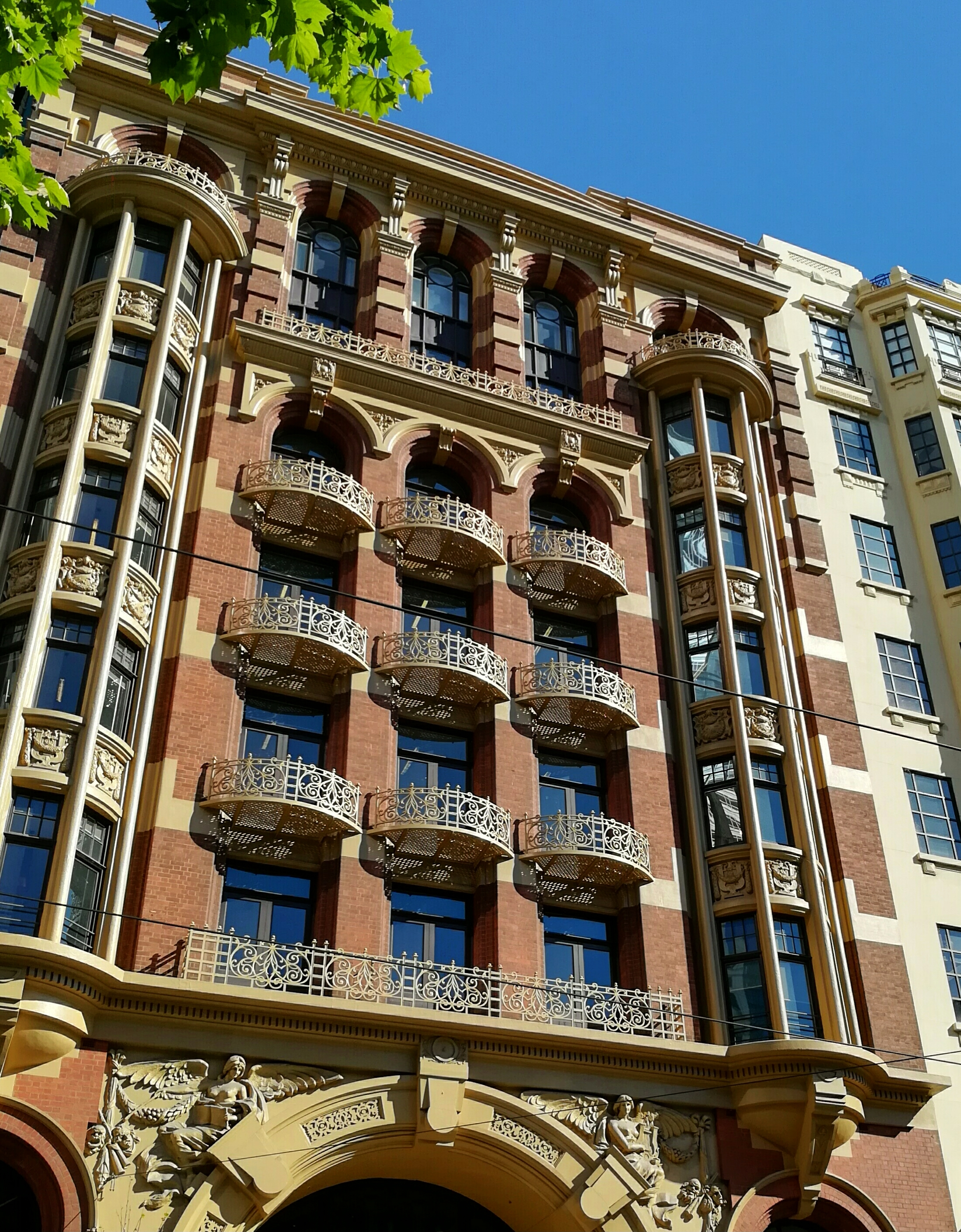
The Auditorium (1912)

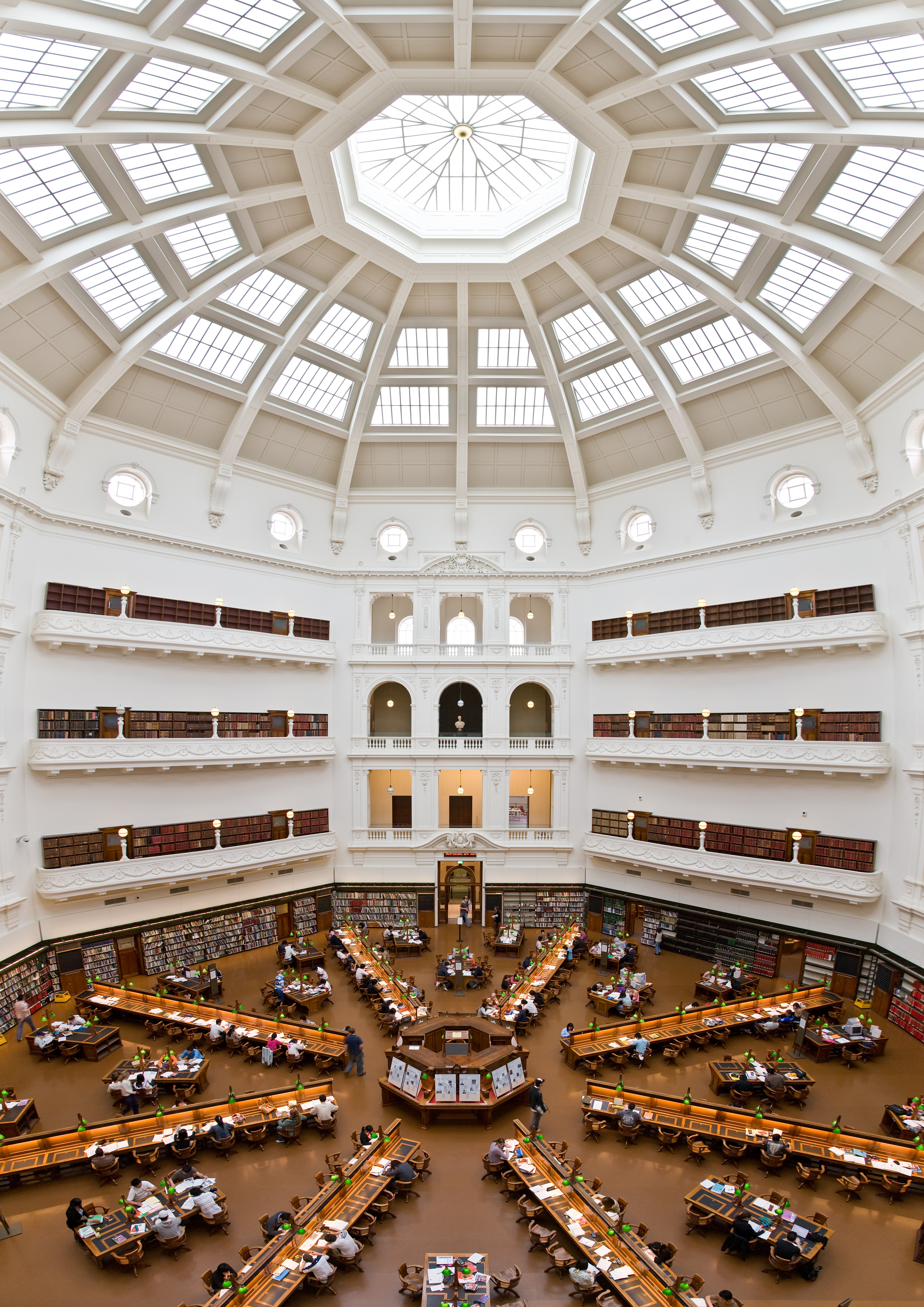
La Trobe Reading Room, State Library Victoria (1913)

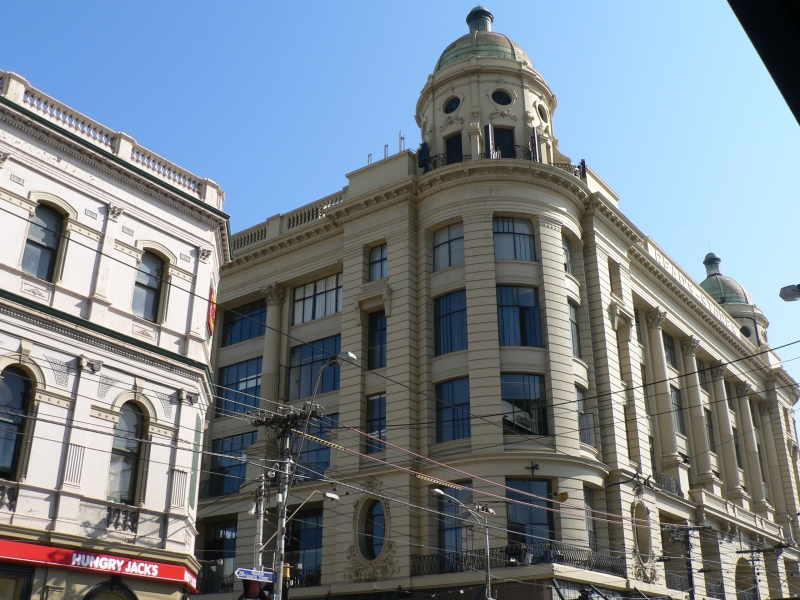
Read's Stores (1915)

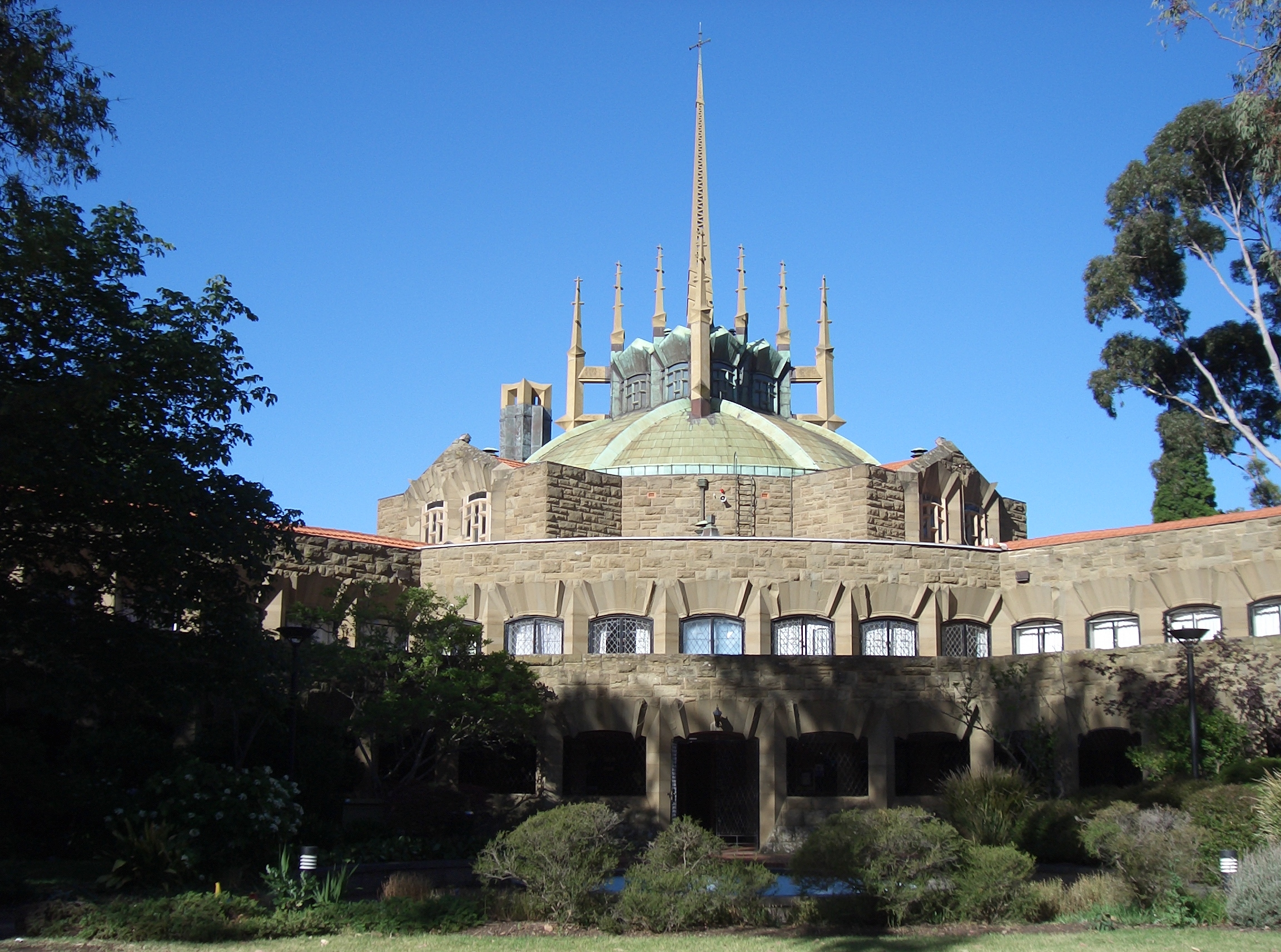
Newman College (1916)

=== 1918–1939: Interwar ===
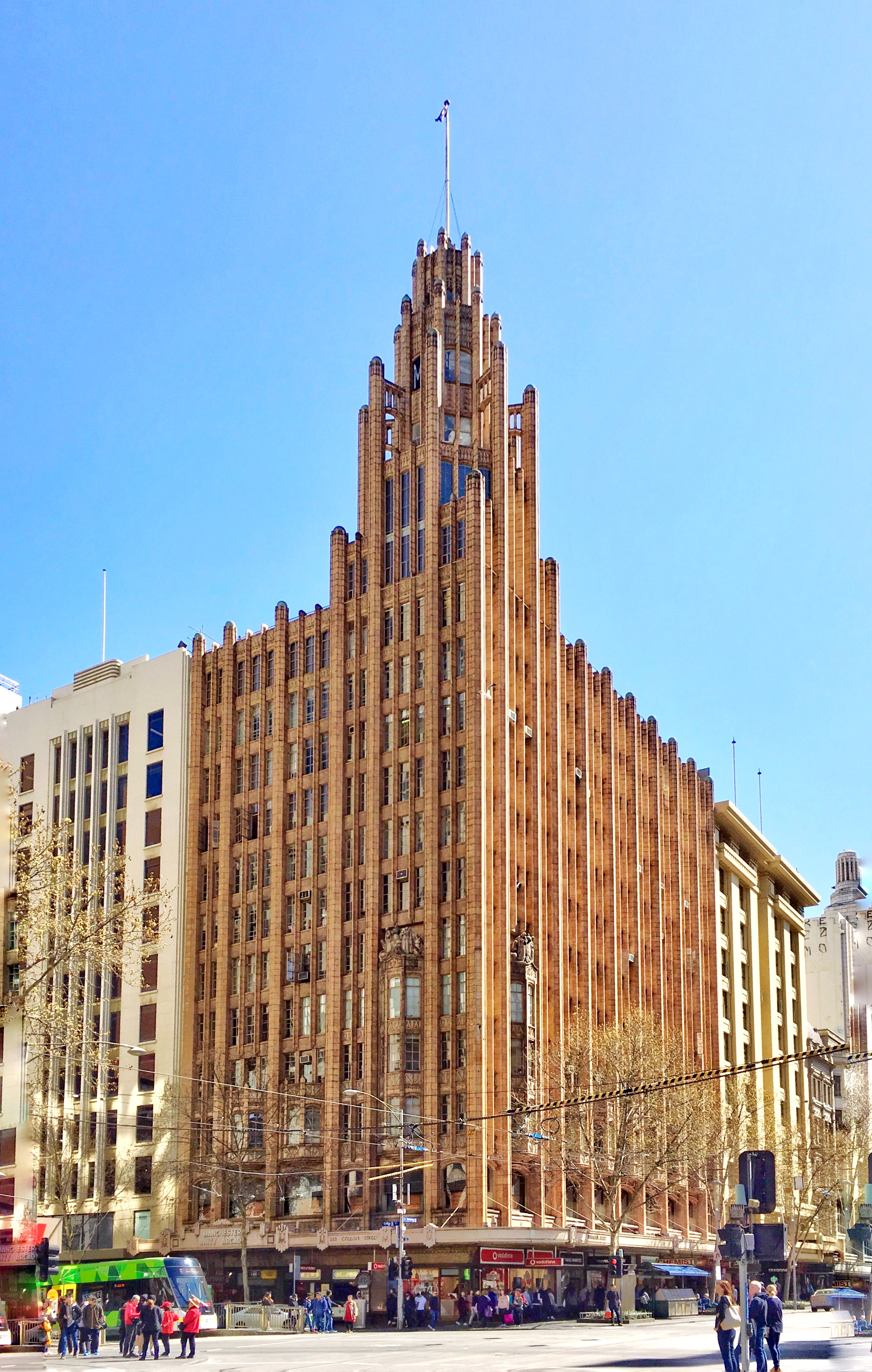
The art deco Manchester Unity Building (1927), flanked on the left by Albany Court (1936) and on the right, The Capitol (1924)

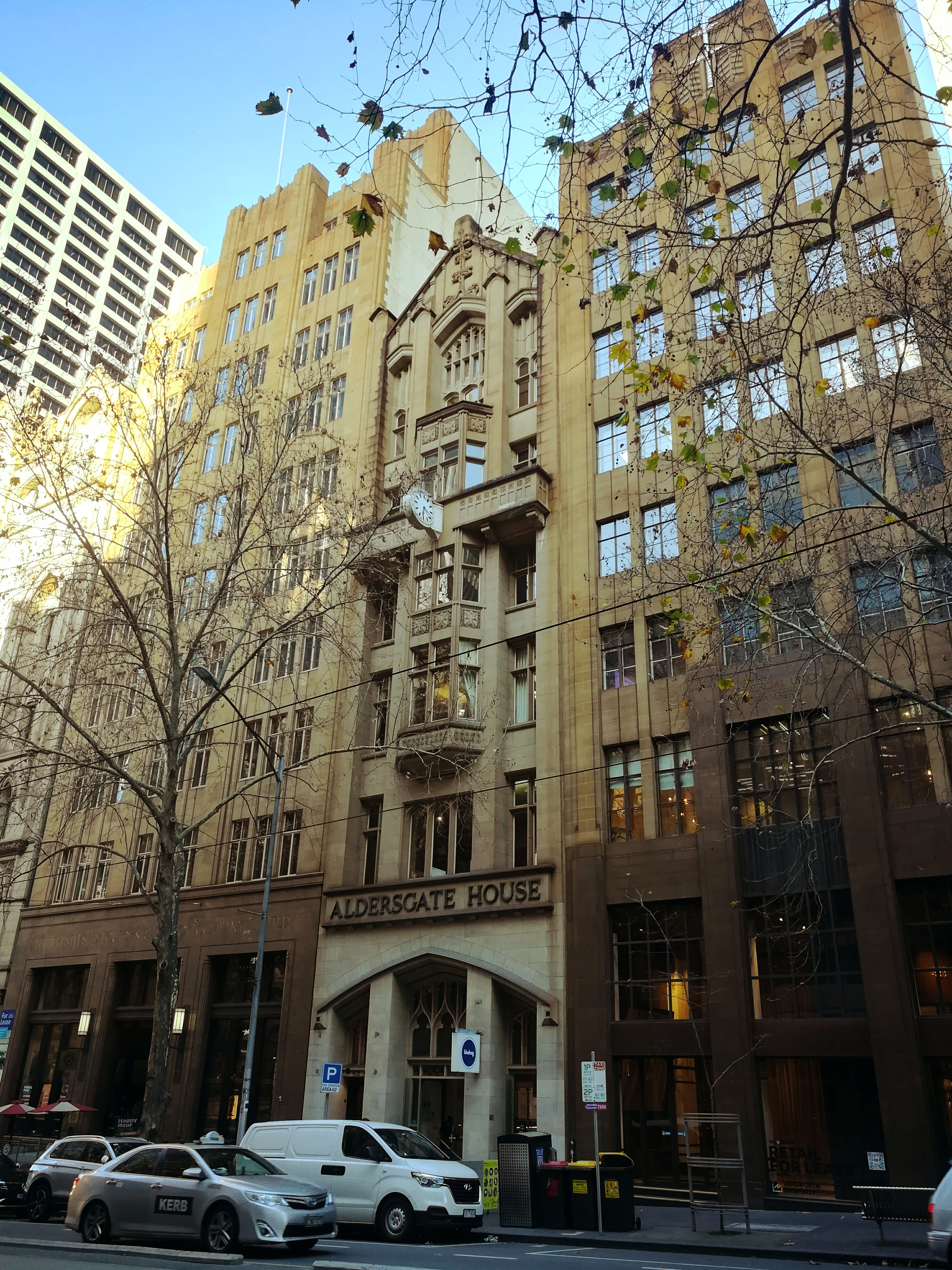
Aldersgate House (1923)

The styles of the early 20th century included Federation architecture, Stripped Classical, and then art deco. The rise of the suburbs in Melbourne meant that large parcels of land could be purchased and homes could be designed in appointed styles of the land owners and home builders. One of the most popular styles was art deco, and several public city buildings were designed in this style, including the Manchester Unity Building, which mixed art deco with Gothic Revival inspired by the Tribune Tower in Chicago. The building was constructed in 1932 by the Manchester Unity I.O.O.F. in Victoria. Other buildings in the art deco style include the Myer Emporium (1920), T & G Building (1929), the Australasian Catholic Assurance Building (1935) and Mitchell House (1937)–which more closely resembles the Streamline Moderne style. These contemporary styles mirrored an increasingly diversifying city, which reflected the changing international architectural fashions. The Second World War saw a halt to construction by 1942. By the late 1940s, Melbourne boasted an array of styles the eras in which it prospered, including Victorian, Gothic, Queen Anne and the most flourishing style of the early 20th century–art deco.

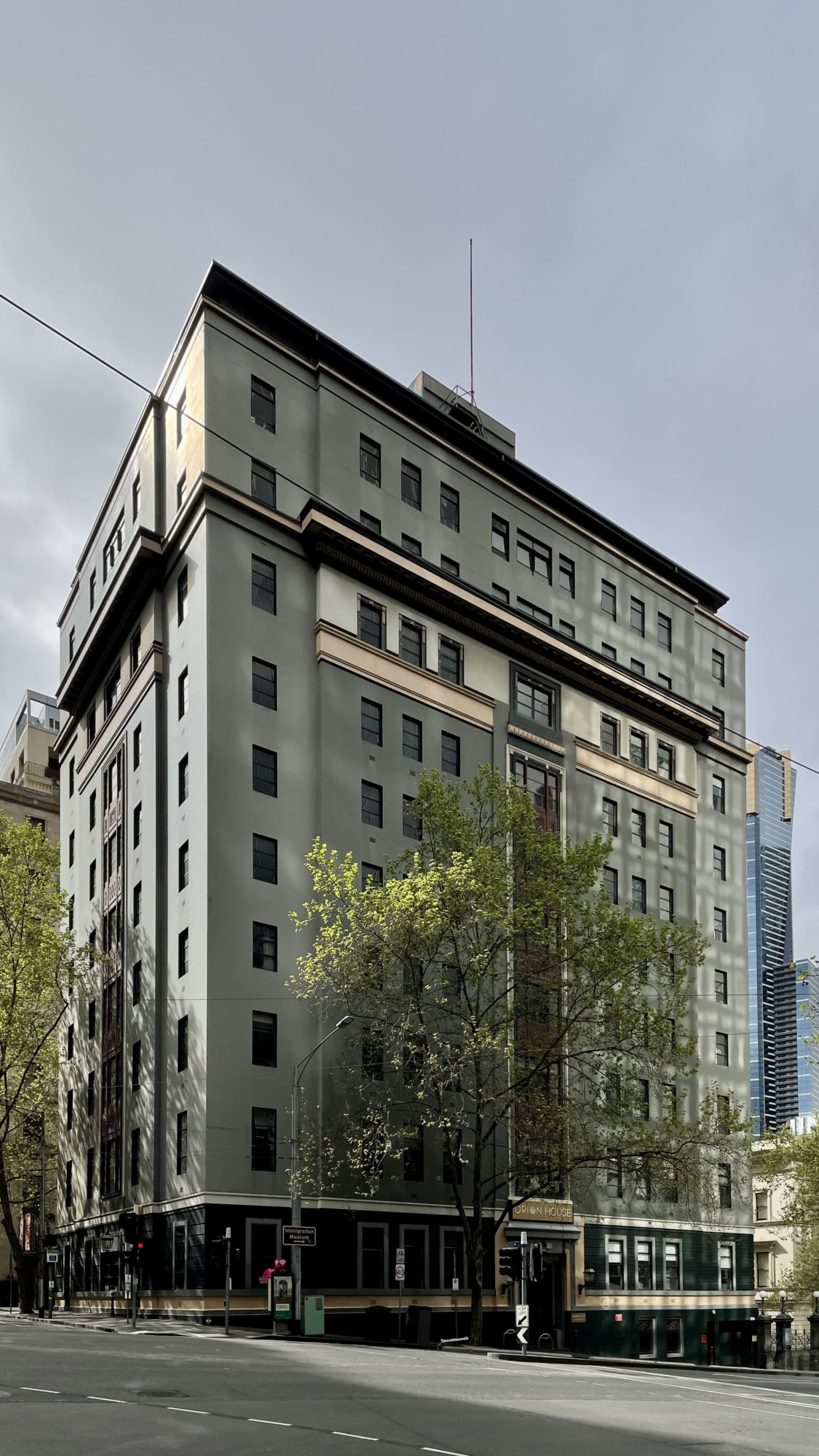
Swann House (1921)

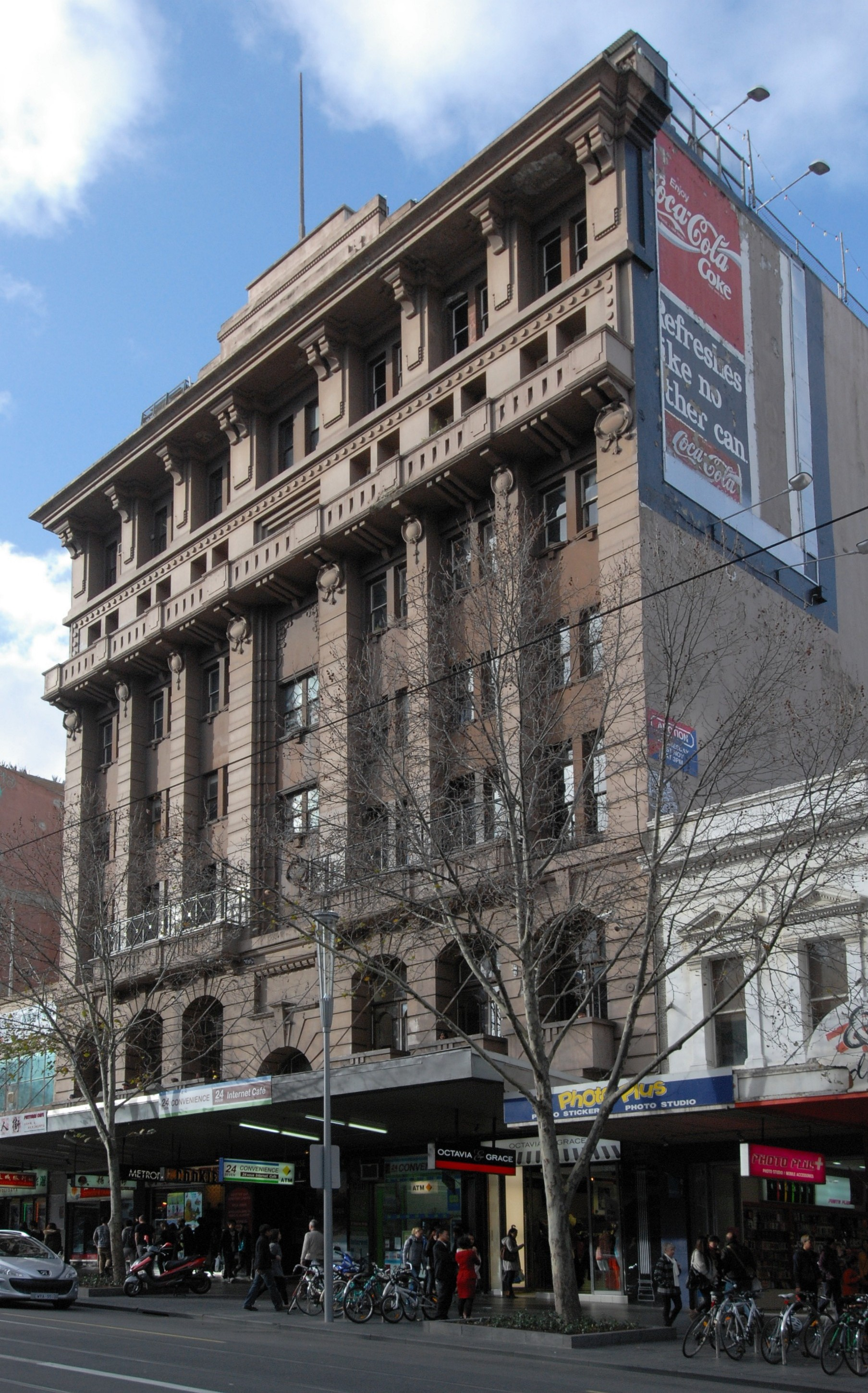
Curtin House (1922)

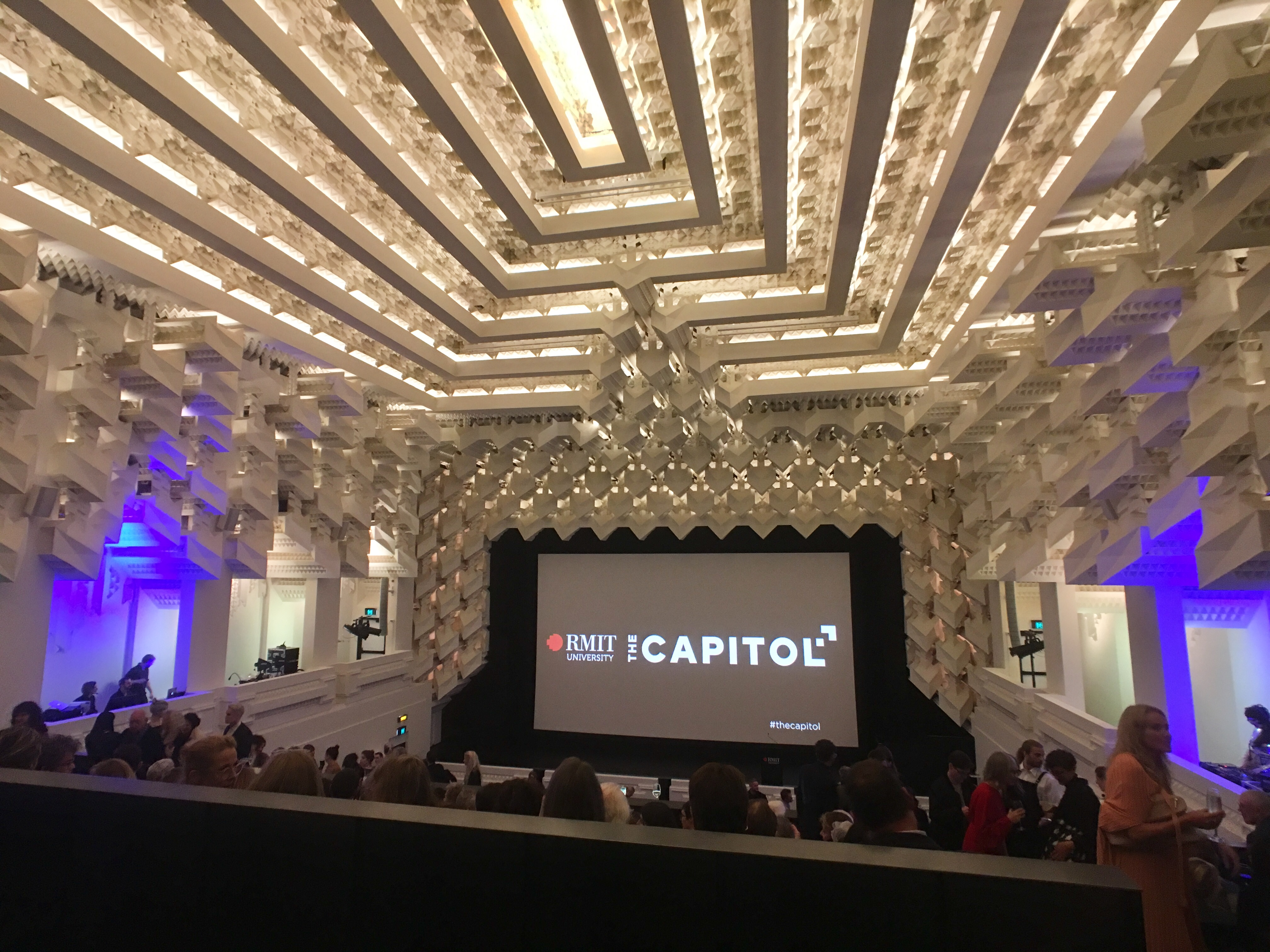
Capitol Theatre (1924)

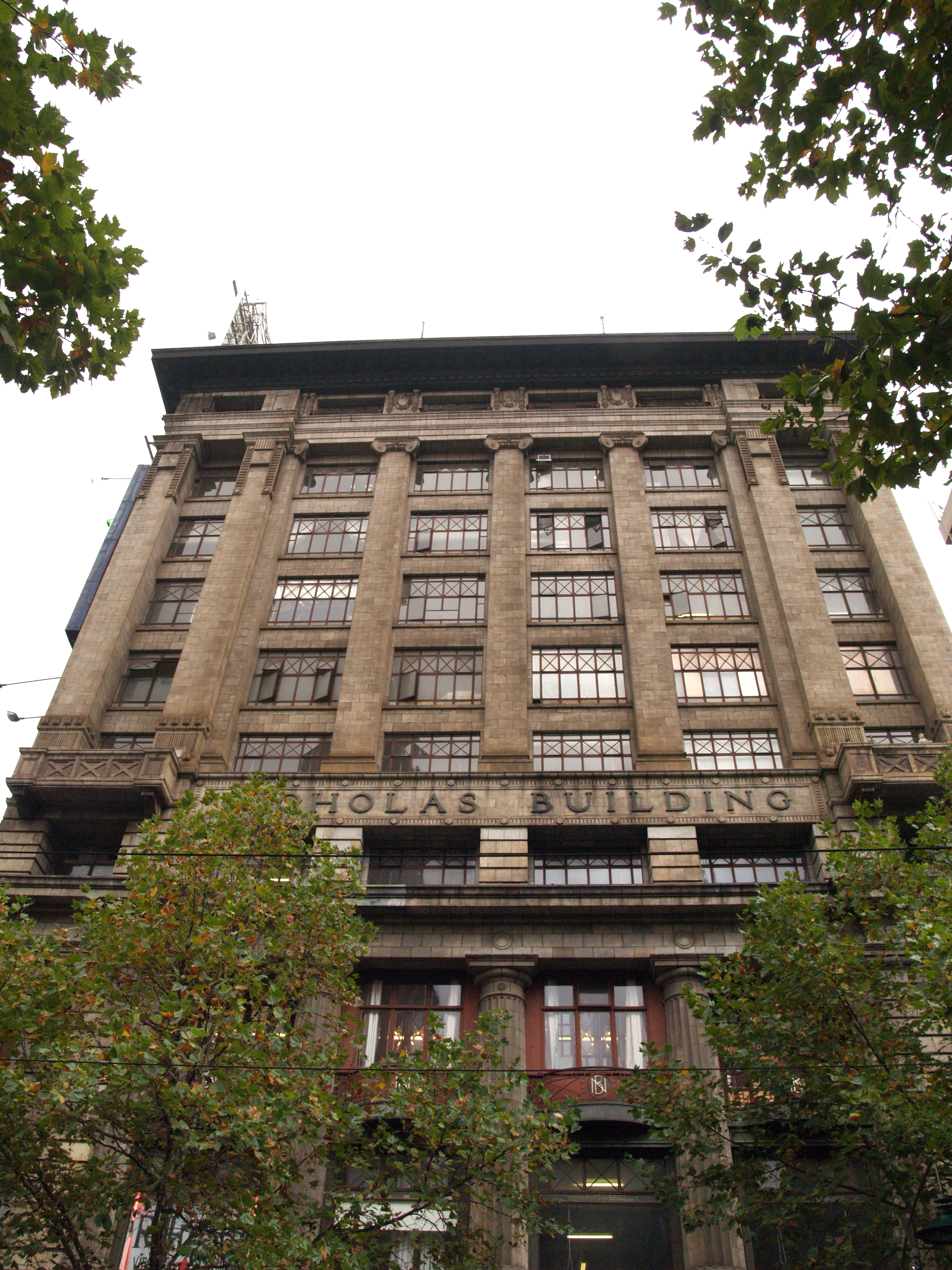
Nicholas Building (1926)

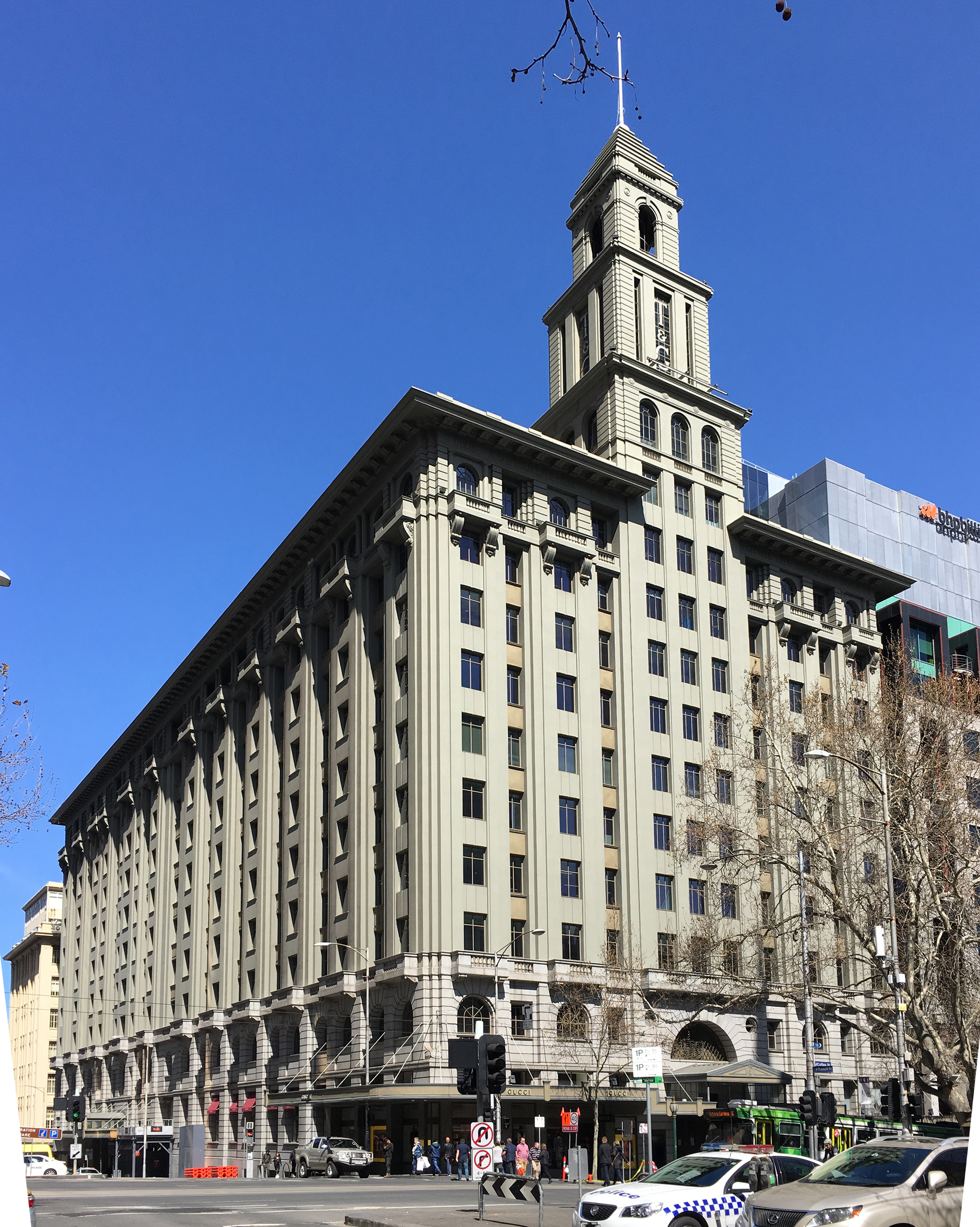
T&G Building (1928)

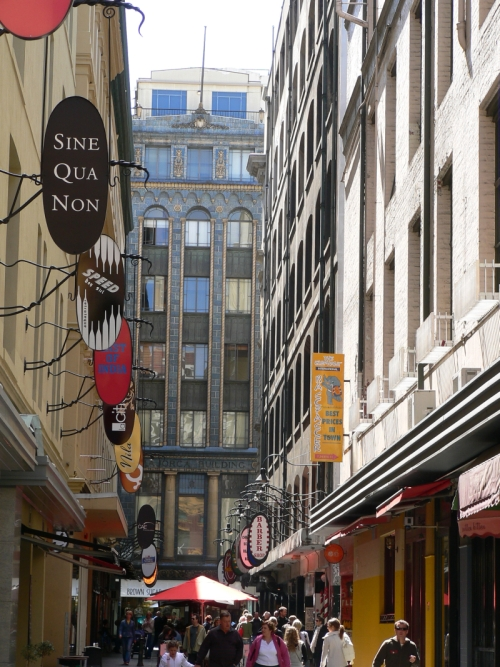
Majorca Building as seen from Degraves Street (1930)

=== 1940–1960s: Postwar Modernism and the International Style ===
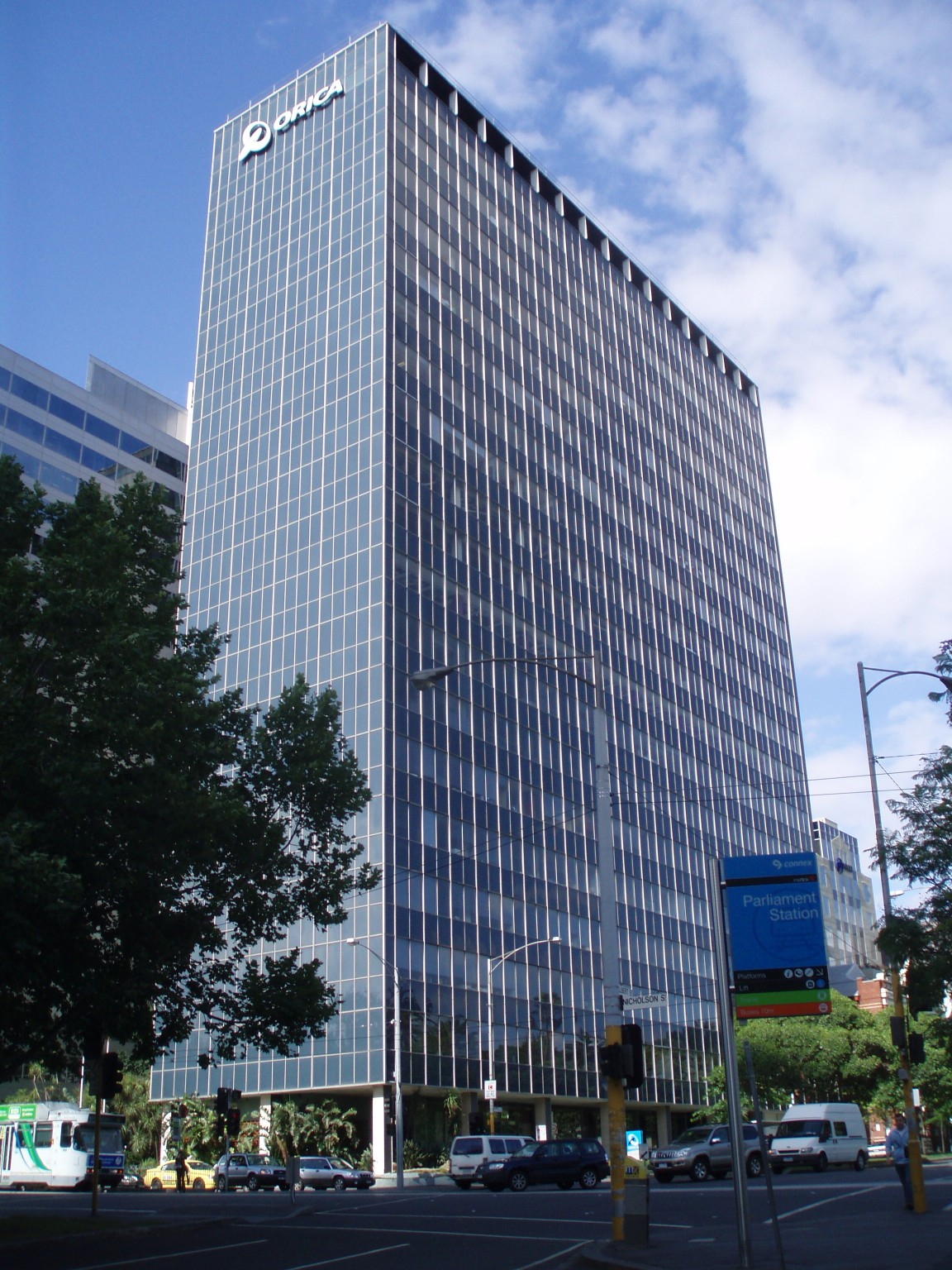
ICI House (1958) was the first building to break Melbourne's long standing height limit, becoming the tallest in Australia and ushering major changes to the city's skyline.

The arrival of the 1950s saw contemporary high rise offices constructed and the ICI House, built in 1955, was Australia's tallest building at the time. ICI House, breaking Melbourne's long-standing 40-metre (132 ft) height limit, was the first International Style high-rise in the country. It symbolised progress, modernity, efficiency and the booming corporate power in a postwar Melbourne. Its development also paved way for the construction of other modern high-rise office buildings, thus changing the shape of Melbourne's already diverse urban centre. Melbourne was the first city in Australia to undergo a post-war high-rise boom beginning in the late 1950s, though Sydney in the following decades built more, with over fifty high-rise buildings constructed between the 1970s–90s. The 1950s and 1960s was a period before heritage controls were enacted, and many commentators now view these years of rampant demolition as one akin to urban vandalism. Whelan the Wrecker, the most successful demolition company, was responsible for most of the destruction of Melbourne's historic buildings. A vast number of city hotels also closed in the 1950s, as a result of blighting liquor laws, which meant that the cost of running a licensed venue outstripped the return. This may have explained the dwindling patronage of Melbourne's grand hotels in the 1950s and 60s.

=== 1960s–1980s: Skyscraper boom ===
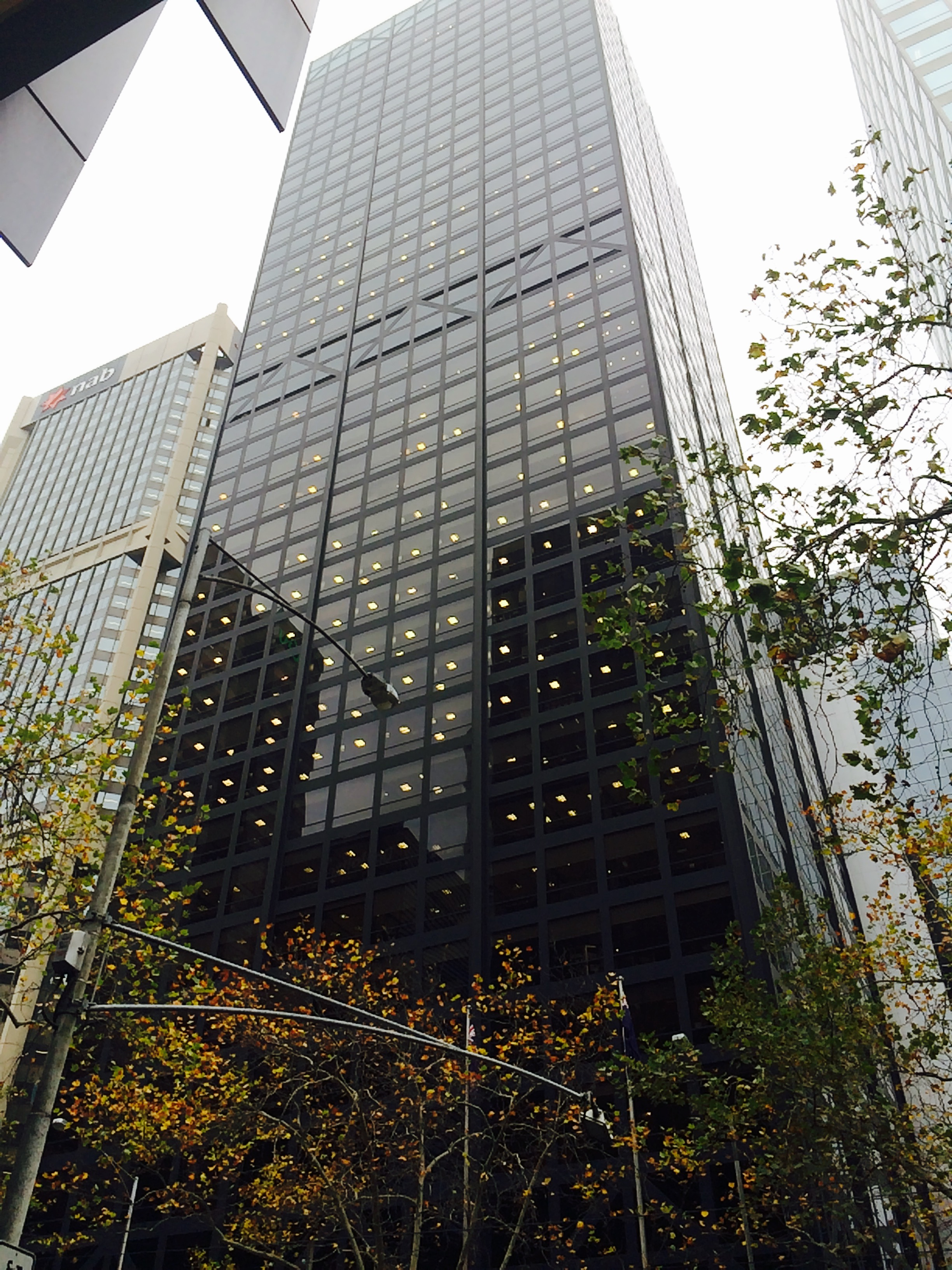
A 1970s mining and financial boom saw many taller buildings constructed in the modern style, like 140 William Street (1972), influenced by Chicago skyscrapers.

Between the late 1970s and 1980s, Melbourne's skyline reached new heights with the construction of several office buildings. Whelan the Wrecker went out of business in the early 1990s and heritage laws were tightened into the mid 1990s. In 1972, 140 William Street (formerly known as BHP House) became the city's first building to exceed 150 metres (490 ft) and was the tallest in Melbourne for a few years. It was constructed in steel and concrete and features an imposing dark glass facade. Designed by the architectural practice Yuncken Freeman alongside engineers Irwin Johnson and Partners, it was heavily influenced by contemporary skyscrapers in Chicago. The local architects sought technical advice from Fazlur Khan of renowned American architectural firm Skidmore, Owings & Merrill (SOM), spending 10 weeks at their Chicago office in 1968. The design ingenuity of 140 William Street was recognised as the building became one of the few heritage registered skyscrapers in Melbourne.

The Optus Centre, which surpassed 140 William Street's height marginally, was completed in 1975. In 1977 Nauru House claimed the feat of the tallest building in Melbourne at 182 metres (597 ft). In 1978, the first of the Collins Place towers were opened, at 185 metres (607 ft). The design of Collins Place was based around a pair of towers at 45 degree angles to the Hoddle Grid, with the triangular spaces between forming an open plaza to the street and a shopping plaza behind the towers. All open spaces are covered by a space frame, with transparent plastic roofing. The whole complex is clad in tan-coloured precast masonry panels.

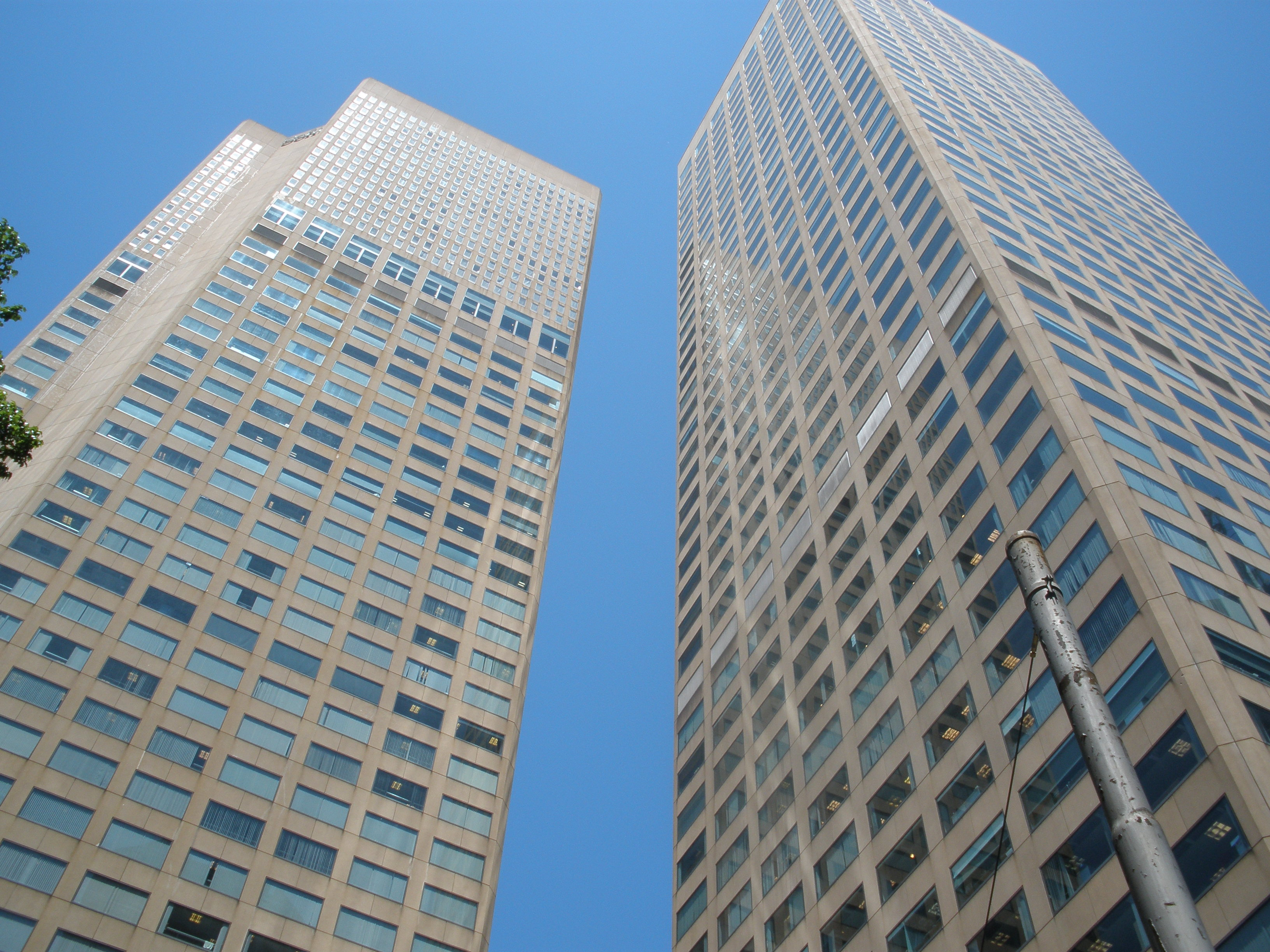
Collins Place twin towers by I. M. Pei were Melbourne's tallest from 1978 to 1986.

In 1986, the Rialto Towers surpassed Sydney's MLC Centre as the tallest building in the Southern Hemisphere, at 251 metres (823 ft). At the time of its opening it was the 23rd–tallest building in the world. In the 1990s, another 9 buildings were constructed in Melbourne that exceeded 150 metres; 5 of these surpassed heights of 200 metres. 101 Collins Street, which is 260-metre-tall (850 ft), became the tallest building in Australia and the Southern Hemisphere in 1991; it was surpassed in height as a result of the completion of the nearby 120 Collins Street that same year. The skyscraper, which stands at 265 metres (869 ft) in height, held the titles for tallest building in Australia and the Southern Hemisphere for fourteen years, until the completion of the Gold Coast's Q1 in 2005.

=== Late-20th century Postmodern movement ===
Melbourne's modern legacy began to give way in the 1980s with the culmination of a strong postmodern movement as many decried the continued loss of the city's cultural character and European charm. During this era, new city planning policies introduced new heritage restrictions to discourage facadism, abolishing the plot ratio policies of previous decades, instituting a 10 metre rule to preserve historic buildings, podiums and setbacks for tall buildings to integrate with historic buildings, reduce the wind tunnel effect and increase natural light to the streets.

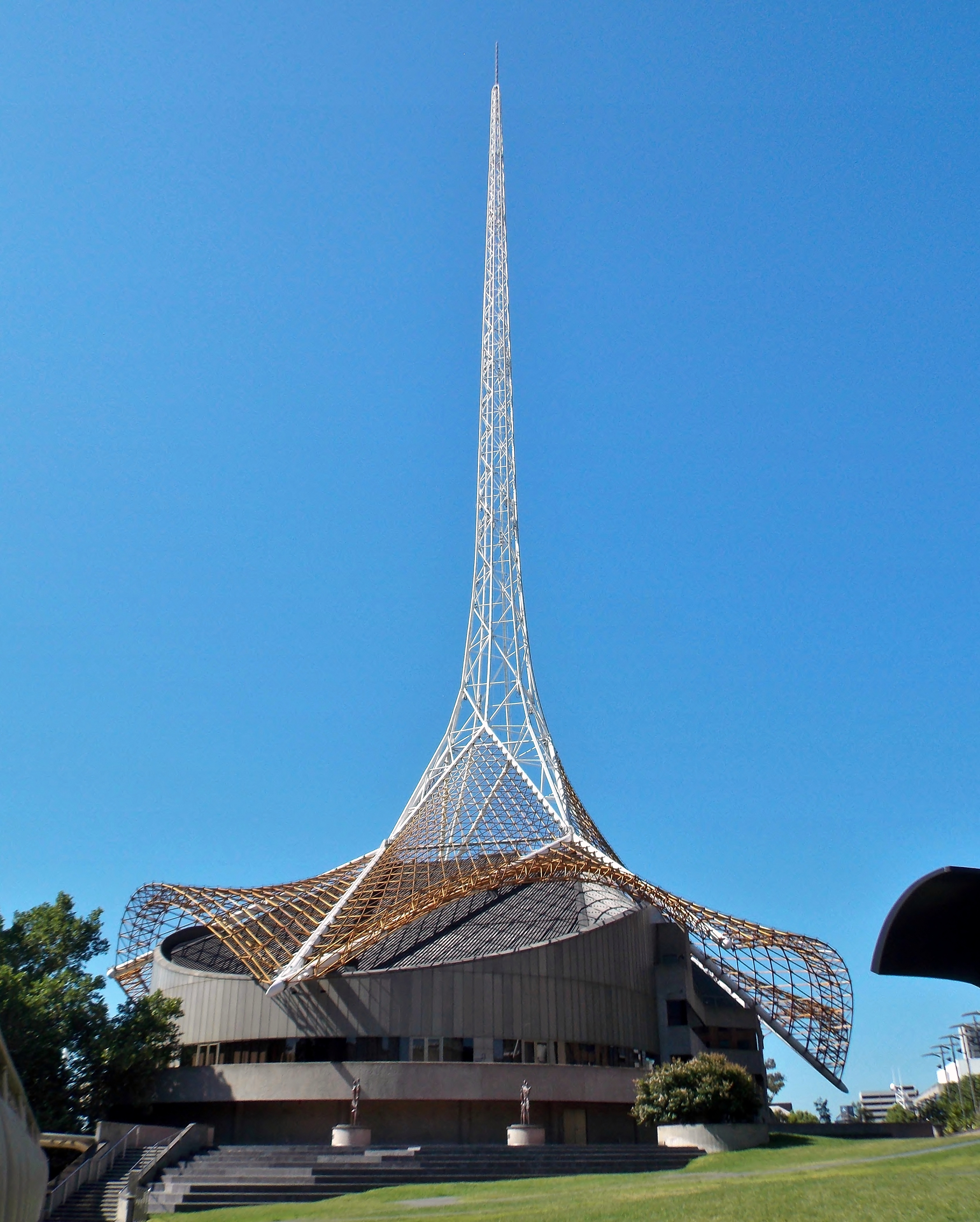
Roy Grounds' State Theatre, along with other buildings of his 1960s vision for the Victorian Arts Centre, anticipated Melbourne's postmodern movement.

Melbourne's strong postmodern movement goes as far back as 1960 with Roy Grounds masterplan for the Arts Centre, though his vision for Melbourne would not be fully realised until later decades. His National Gallery of Victoria (1968) was one of the first bluestone clad buildings of the late 20th Century. While some earlier 1950s modern buildings featured ornament, notably Wilson Hall (1956), Grounds design makes direct historical references instead of rejecting them. Reminiscent of a giant Renaissance Revival palazzo and surrounded by a moat, the minimalist facade is designed to feature its large cut stone "bricks". The entrance features a large stone arch above which is a Norma Redpath designed Victoria Coats of Arms classical metal sculpture. Among its various modern glass flourishes are a tactile water-wall and the Great Hall's giant stained glass ceiling designed by Leonard French, reputedly the largest in the world. The State Theatre (1984) features a massive open frame spire inspired by Paris's Eiffel Tower, originally designed as a solid copper cone. The interior, designed by John Truscott is decorated in rich red velvet and brass ornament. The Arts Centre would set the scene for a postmodern revival in Melbourne which gained momentum in the mid 1980s.

One Collins Street (1984) on a prominent Spring Street corner is seen as a landmark for postmodern Melbourne and is one of few 1980s designs to receive the Maggie Edmond Enduring Architecture Award. It was the first major project to successfully integrate the old and new, preserving and restoring a significant Victorian streetscape including Grosvenor Chambers (1888), Leonard Terry's Campbell House (1877) and a row of three storey Lloyd Tayler-designed terraces (1884). One Collins' stepped form, setback style, elegantly minimilist square windows and cut stone-like texture established a strong reputation for emerging firm Denton Corker Marshall (DCM). DCM, however, upon RVIA nomination for the clearly North American palazzo inspired 91–97 William Street (1985–1987) had already begun rejecting any association with the term post-modern. While their later designs appear to reject historic references, the firm did produce two other influential postmodern buildings. Firstly their work in 222 Exhibition Street (TAC House) (1986–88) made an explicit statement against the dominance of glass curtain wall design of the late international style using open steel grill elements, scale, symmetry and a differentiated podium. The firm would later reuse similar elements in the landmark skyscraper 101 Collins Street.

Melbourne's obsession with postmodernism in the late 1980s would spawn many more heritage sympathetic CBD developments particularly in what had become known as the "Paris End" of Collins Street. 90 Collins Street (1987) by Peck von Hartel preserved a Victorian era professional building and mirroring it to create a symmetrical central entrance under a mock stone faced North American style stepped tower, a design model applied successfully by New York's similarly dated 712 Fifth Avenue. Peck von Hartel would follow with one of the most ambitious projects of postmodern Melbourne – 333 Collins Street (1990) – which not only preserved the old Commercial Bank of Australia Limited domed Chamber but its waterfall design clad in granite and its giant copper dome made a strong postmodern statement on the skyline. 333 Collins Street recreates the original facade of the bank which had been stripped off in the interwar period. The design's faceted concave and convex vertical facade and details show the strong influence from Richmond House in London built a few years earlier. Metier3 won praise from the RAIA for its design for the preserved T&G Building (1928–1939) extension (1990) which created a new extension punctuated by metal studs and balconies designed to blend into the Collins streetscape.

By the 1990s, the movement was no longer just about sympathy to Melbourne's heritage character – it was about making a bold new visual statement for the city's future. Daryl Jackson's winning but incomplete 1991 designs for the Melbourne Museum with its modern interpretation of neo-classical domed structures saw him become one of the biggest influencers in the movement. Kisho Kurokawa's Melbourne Central Shopping Centre (1991) successfully bridged modernism and postmodernism incorporating the old shot tower under a modern glass cone.

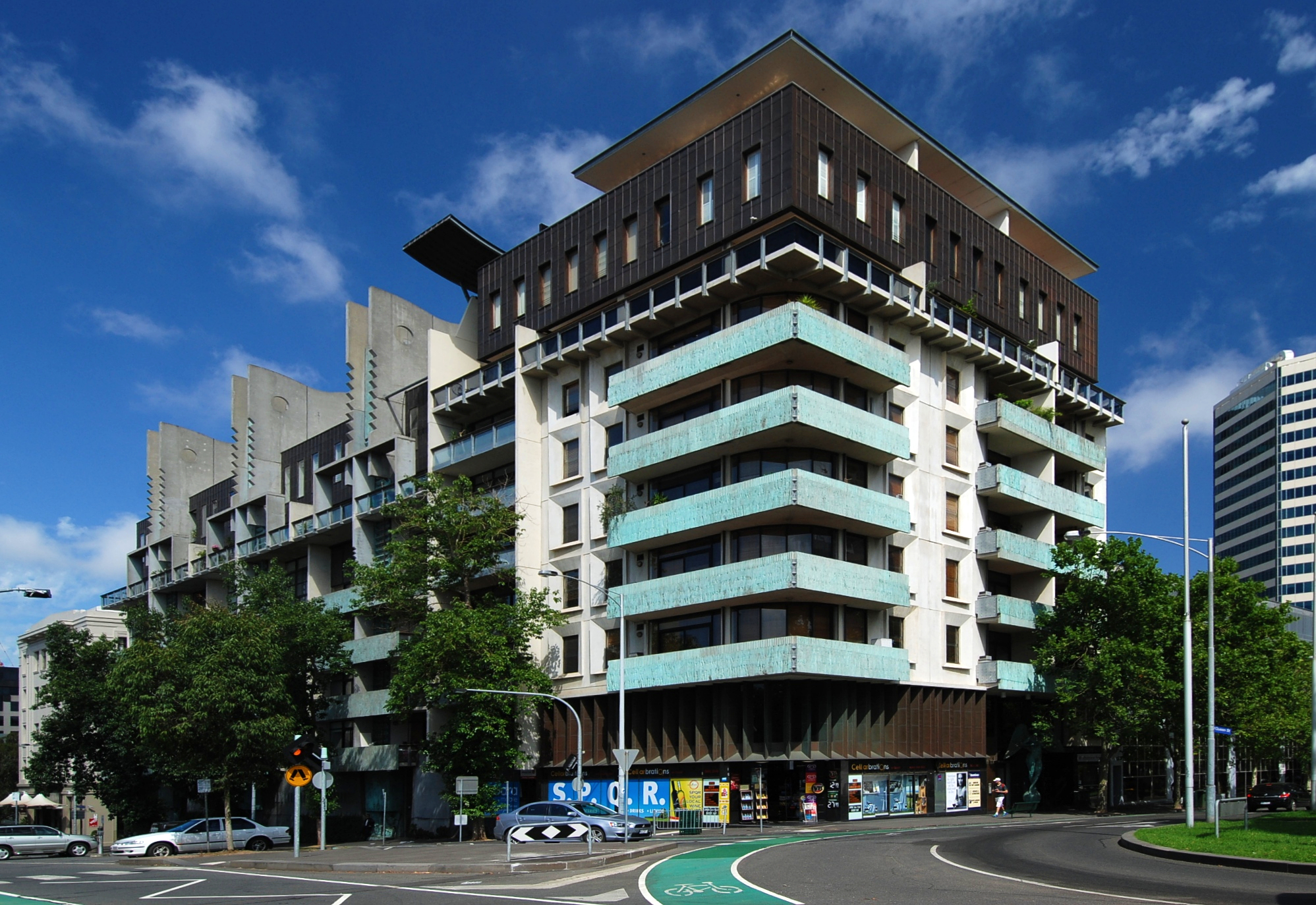
Nonda Katsalidis' Melbourne Terrace Apartments (1993) was credited with making apartment living in the CBD fashionable.

Nonda Katsalidis emerged as one of the champions of Melbourne's postmodernist movement with his work on the Argus Centre which saw the partial restoration of the old Argus building. His reputation grew with the Melbourne Terrace Apartments (1993), one of the first contemporary developments to feature classical influences. The richly complex building juxtaposed elements including weathering steel and oxidizing copper details, along with muscular cut out prefabricated concrete elements evocative of brutalism. At its residential entrances were copper infused sculptures from Greek mythology.

The towers 101 Collins Street and nearby 120 Collins Street (both 1991) drew inspiration in their design from North American skyscrapers with their stepped massing culminating in prominent central towers. 101 Collins Street is particularly notable for the giant columns at ground level which were designed to be explicitly decorative and freestanding without bearing any load to make a bold postmodern statement, the interior also had a row of giant order columns however these were removed in later remodelling. The Langham (1991), HWT building (1991) and 530 Collins Street (1991) and Casselden Place (1992) also contributed to Melbourne's 1990s North American looking skyline vying for prominence with the modernist landmarks. Southbank Promenade designed by Denton Corker Marshall in 1990 featured smoothly cut bluestone and metal ornaments which were highly fashionable and helped revived Melbourne's southern riverfront. Southgate Shopping Centre (1992) continued the theme making extensive use of smoothly cut bluestone, with gothic and second empire references featuring a faceted facade, keystones, mansard roof, cornices, large rectangular panels of glass reminiscent of tudor casement windows, metal ornament and spiral stairs as strong historical references. These features however are set to be removed as part of an approved a $470 million Fender Katsalidis designed commercial tower redevelopment announced in 2020.

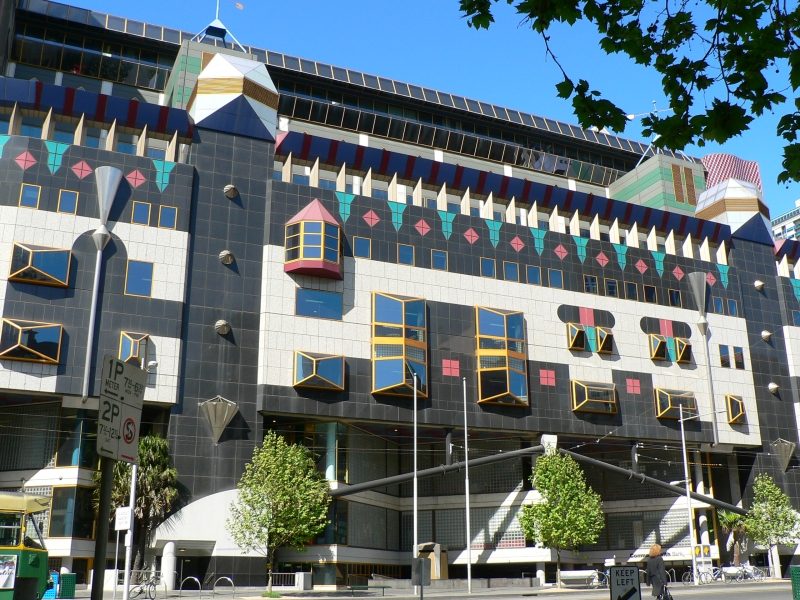
RMIT Building 8's complex and fanciful design was seen as a turning point in Melbourne's strong postmodernist movement in 1993.

Edmond and Corrigan were seen by many to embody Melbourne's new avant garde with the prominent RMIT Building 8 (1993) in the centre of the city which was the first major postmodern CBD building to receive the Victorian Architecture Medal. ANZ's World Headquarters at 100 Queen Street (1993) similarly saw the restoration of a cluster of neo-gothic buildings including the Safe Deposit Building, Former Stock Exchange and Gothic bank by Lovell Chen (however the trade-off was demolition a substantially intact row of tall interwar buildings to make way for the new tower's podium). Storey Hall (1884) extension (1996) by ARM Architecture extended the legacy of Building 8 with what was one of the first examples of Deconstructivism in Melbourne, a style which would be later popularised by Federation Square. The result was two Victorian Architectural winning postmodern building standing virtually side-by-side along with "The Green Brain" (2010) at Building 22 helped establish RMIT's Swanston Street frontage one of the Australia's most significant postmodern streetscapes as well as one of the most significant interiors, among its many interesting features paying tribute to the notorious abstract Melbourne sculpture Vault (1978).

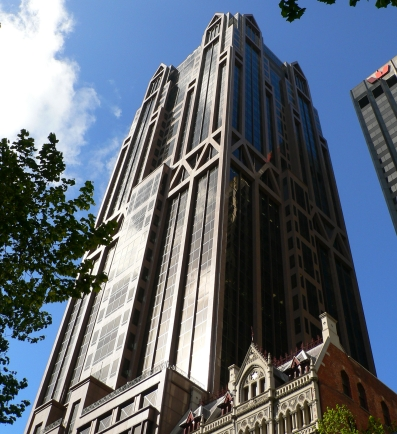
ANZ's 1993 World Headquarters Tudor gothic inspired tower was designed to assimilate the cluster of 19th century gothic revival buildings below.

Some of Melbourne's boldest postmodern statements are now lost, for example the podiums of the Grand Hyatt was remodelled in 2008. Kurokawa's original design for Melbourne Central including its podium featuring a geodesic dome, concave and large faceted oriel windows were lost to remodelling done by ARM in 2006.

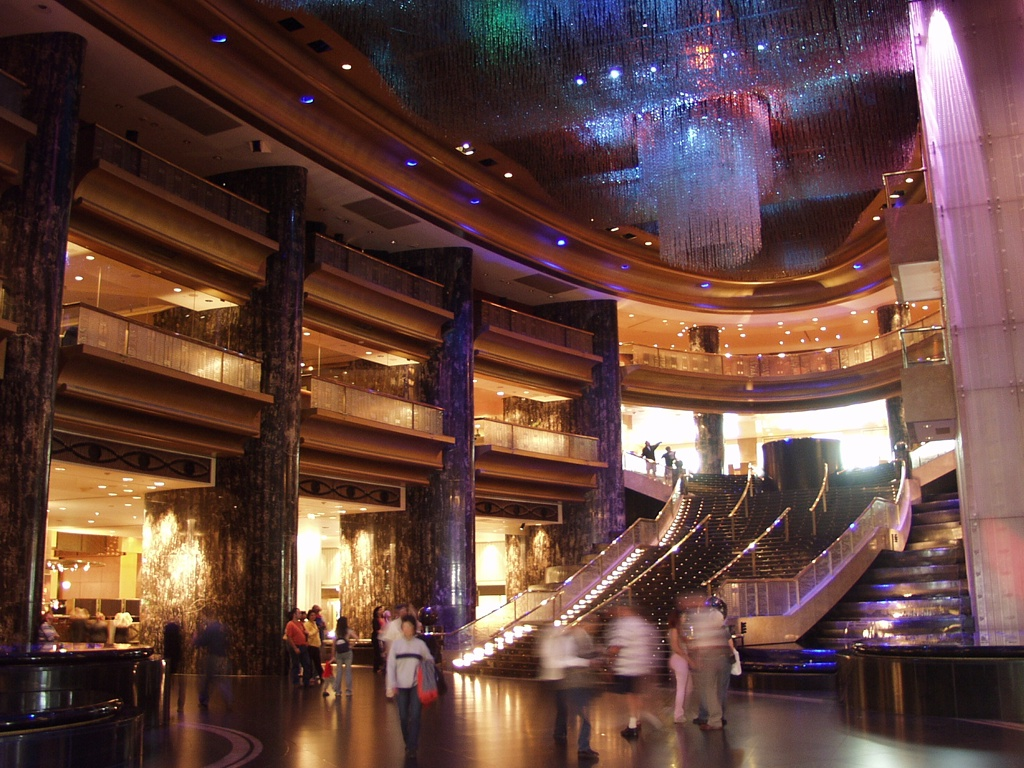
The Atrium at Crown Melbourne, completed in 1997, is one of the building's many highly detailed interior features.

One of the last great postmodern statements to the city was the Crown Melbourne at South bank, by a collaboration of architects. While Crown Towers is clearly modern in form, the promenade podium attributed to Daryl Jackson feature a juxtaposition of elements and materials. This gives the buildings massive footprint a human scale through the use of articulated podiums decorated in a variety of different textures evoking the feel of a continguous village. The design encourages the mixed-use activation of the promenade and greatly contributing to the precinct's strong pedestrian activation. It also features some of the most elaborate and decorative contemporary interiors in the city, particularly notable are the colourful and detailed Atrium and Palladium Room.

Between 1996 and 1997, a less admired Melbourne building became a target of demolition: the Gas and Fuel towers. These structures were built in the late 1960s at a time when modernisation of the city was considered favourable. The two towers, designed by Perrot and Parents, were also known as the Princes Gate Towers. As public opinion swayed back towards the desirability of 19th century heritage, the modernist Gas and Fuel Towers grew to be seen as "ugly and featureless", with no connection to the heritage that surrounded. The Kennett Government's decision to demolish the modernist towers was generally met with approval, and the towers were demolished to make way for Federation Square.

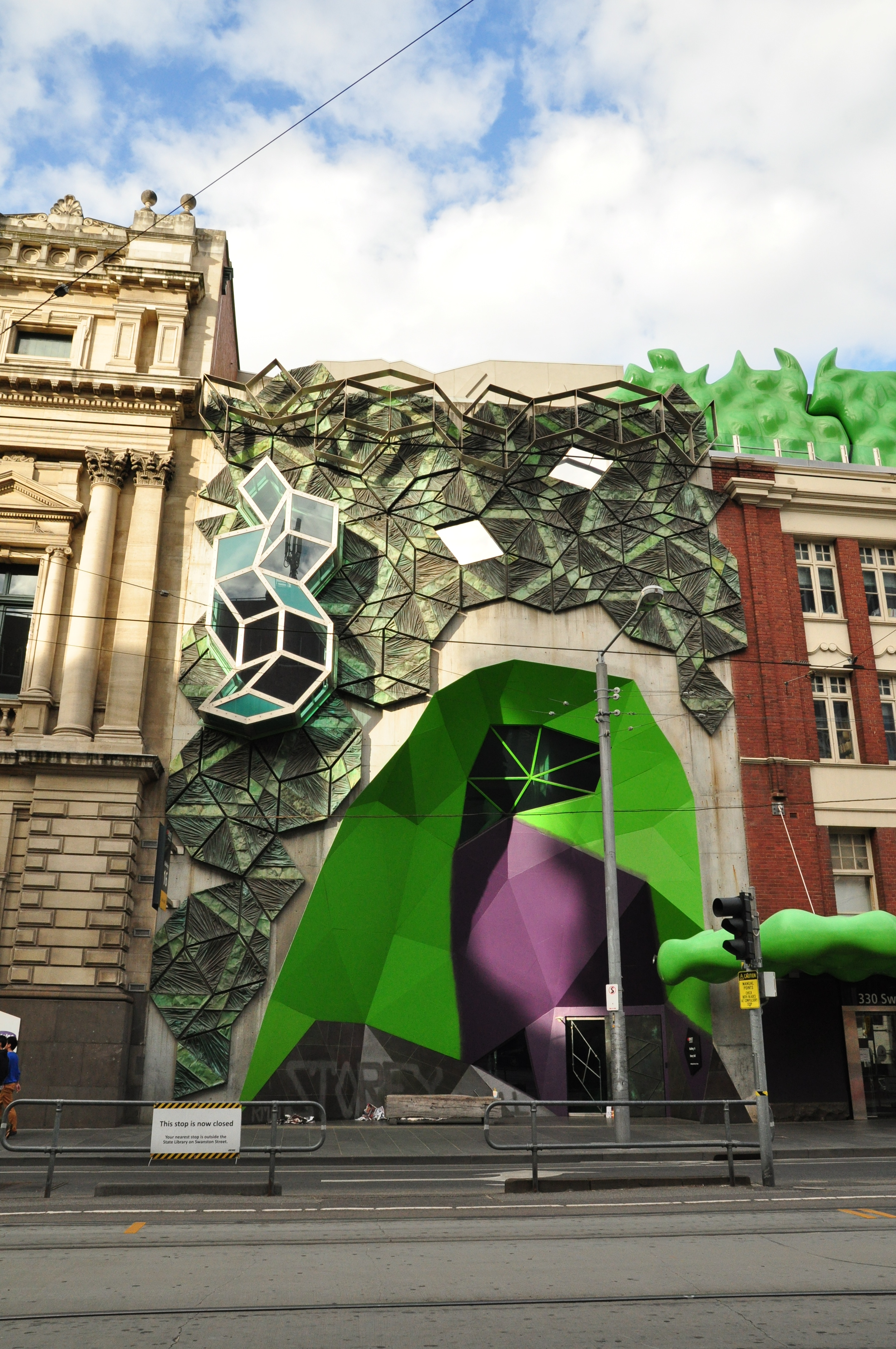
Storey Hall (1996)

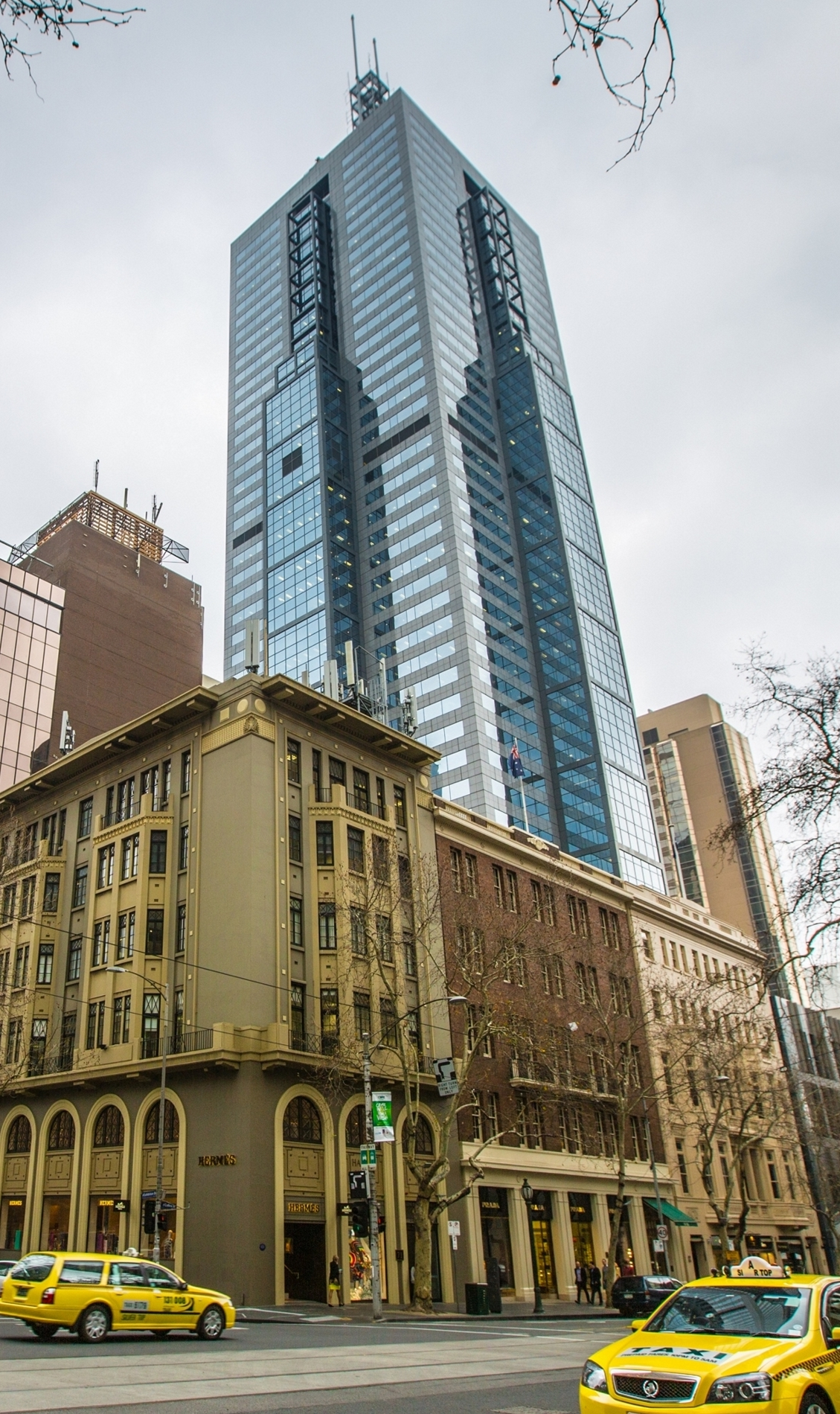
101 Collins Street (1991)

=== 1990s Modernist revival ===
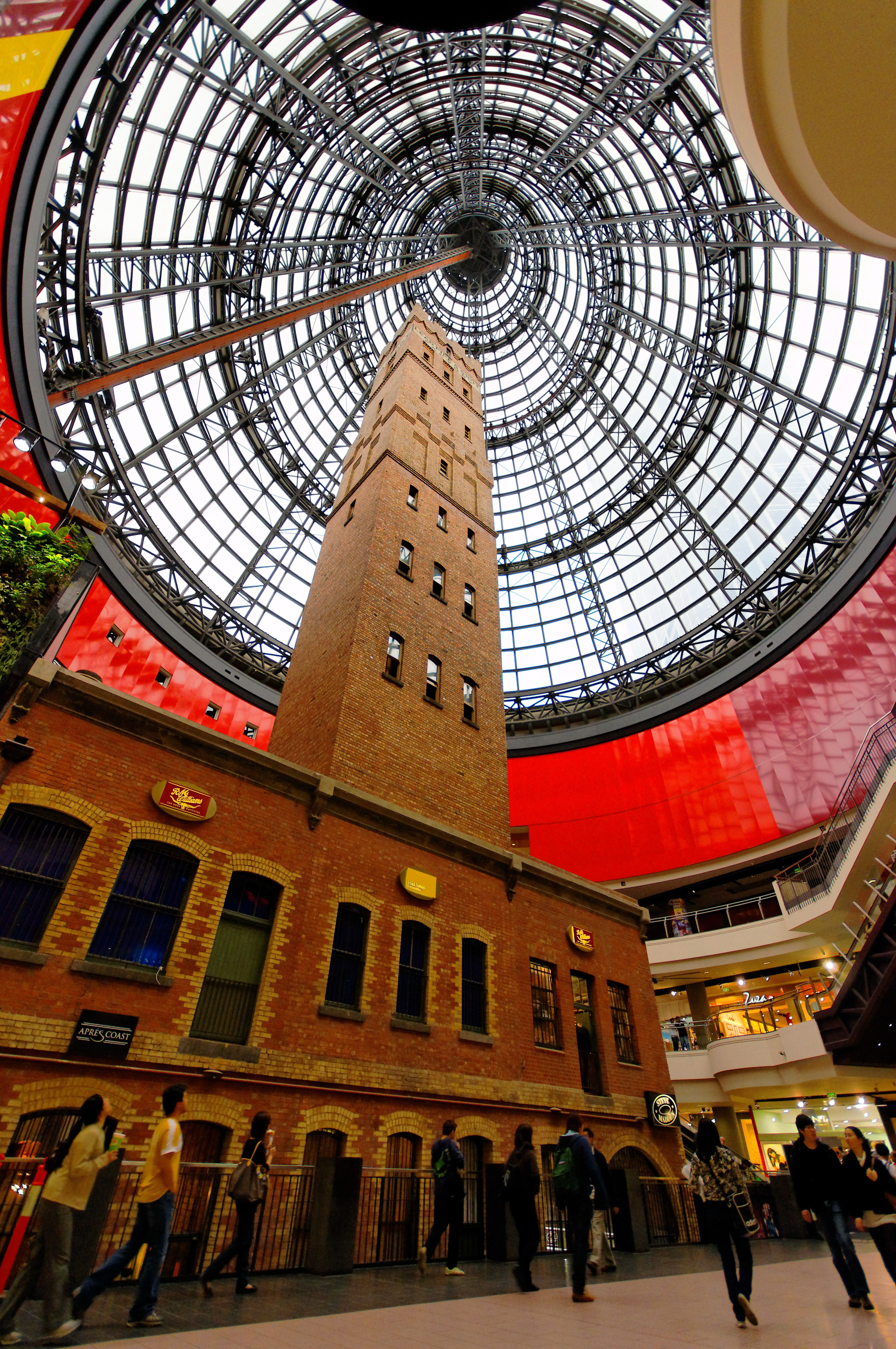
Coop's Shot Tower (1889) retained within the conical glass roof of Kisho Kurokawa's Melbourne Central shopping centre

By the turn of the 21st Century postmodernism in Melbourne fell out of favour. The 1990s saw modernists hold fast against the postmodern trend and several significant developments emerged. Planners began to repeal the rules relating to podiums and remove height restrictions, often favouring demolition and removal or as a last resort for heritage listed buildings, facadism, resulting in very few old buildings being integrated with new ones. Bourke Place (600 Bourke Street) (1991) and Perrott Lyon Mathieson's Telstra Corporate Centre (1992) were both popular among the architectural community of the time, the latter, which took out an RAIA award, almost single-handedly revived the 20th Century late modern style as so many other buildings followed suit. Several of the high profile postmodernists including Denton Corker Marshall (DCM) and Nonda Katsalidis signalled a strong shift to modernism. DCM's work on the Melbourne Convention and Exhibition Centre (1996) and Melbourne Museum (1999) further entrenched the modern. Katsalidis Ian Potter Museum of Art (1998) and Republic Tower (1999) were among the last major examples of postmodernism in the city but also represented a strong swing toward the modern.

Demolition of historic buildings continued. A prominent example was the Hotel Australia, built in a Functionalist/Moderne style in 1939 demolished in 1989. In 2008, one of the last remaining Victorian arcades in the Melbourne CBD was demolished under approval from the planning minister at the time Matthew Guy. The decision and the rapidity of the demolition created public outrage. The building, Eastern Arcade and Apollo Hall, built in 1872, was constructed on the site of the old Haymarket Theatre. It was the third arcade to be built in Melbourne and larger than both Queen's Arcade and the Royal Arcade. The Eastern Arcade was designed by George Johnston and had 68 stores as well as an upper storey. Despite discussions held by the Melbourne City Council to preserve the building or at least its facade, the entire structure was torn down in 2008.

=== New millennium architecture ===
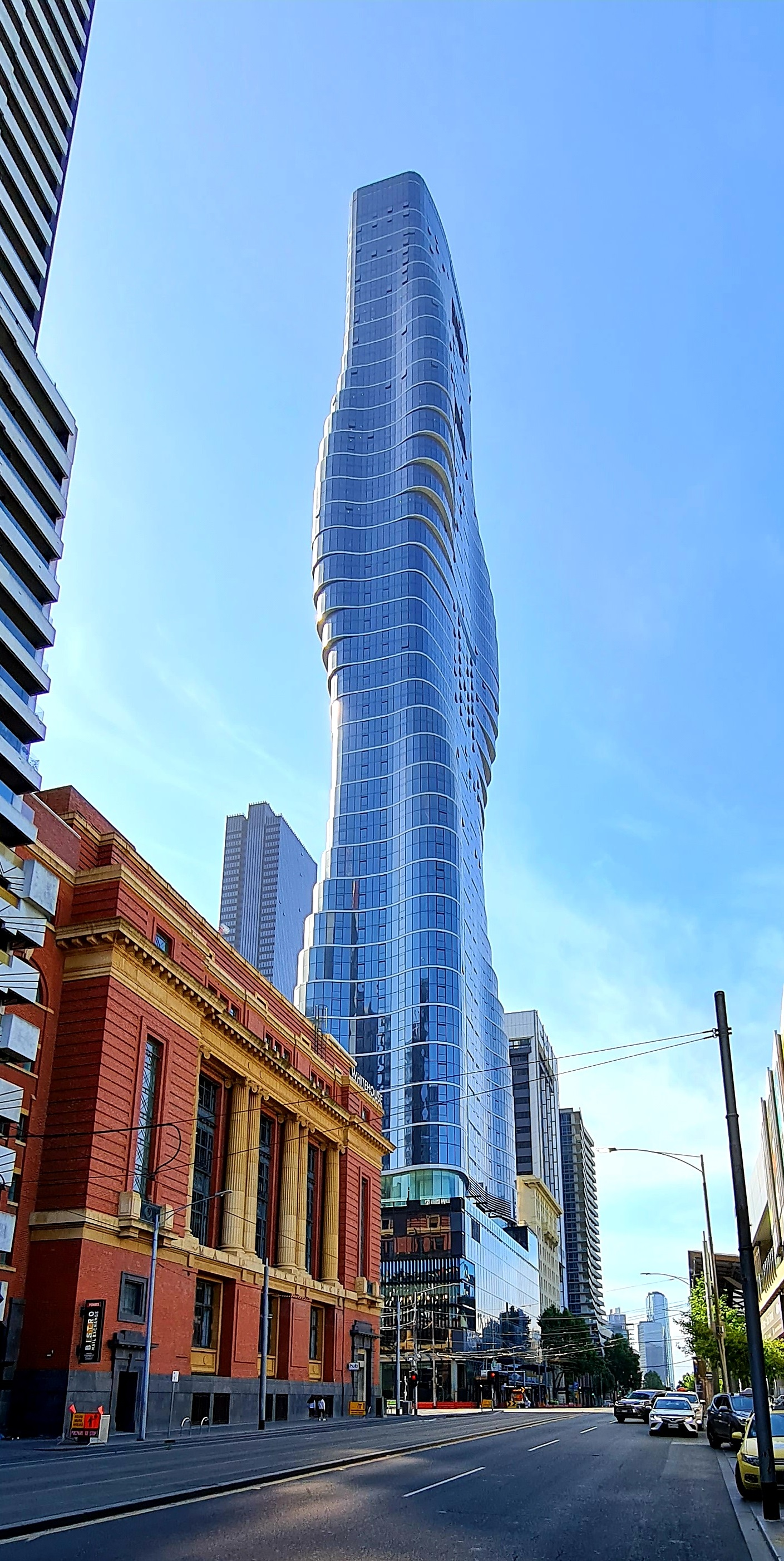
Premier Tower, juxtaposed with the heritage-listed Mail Exchange Building (left)

The new millennium saw a tighter attitude towards heritage conservation and a construction boom in Melbourne. On the back of Australia's financial and mining booms between 1969 and 1970, and the establishment of the headquarters of many major companies in the city, resulted in a continual rise in large, modern office buildings being constructed outside of the historic city centre and in newer precincts like Southbank and Docklands to preserve heritage overlays within the city centre.

The 2000s saw a continuation of skyscraper and high-rise construction, with the urban renewal of Docklands in 2000 and the construction of Eureka Tower, an apartment building which, as of 2026, is Melbourne's second–tallest skyscraper and the 77th tallest in the world at 92 floors and 297 metres (974 ft) high. The glass-style building was constructed by Fender Katsalidis Architects. Australia 108 is Melbourne's tallest building and the tallest in Australia to its roof, completed in June 2020. As of 2026, Melbourne is home to 79 completed or topped-out skyscrapers – a number higher than any Australian city and the second-highest, after Jakarta, in the Southern Hemisphere.

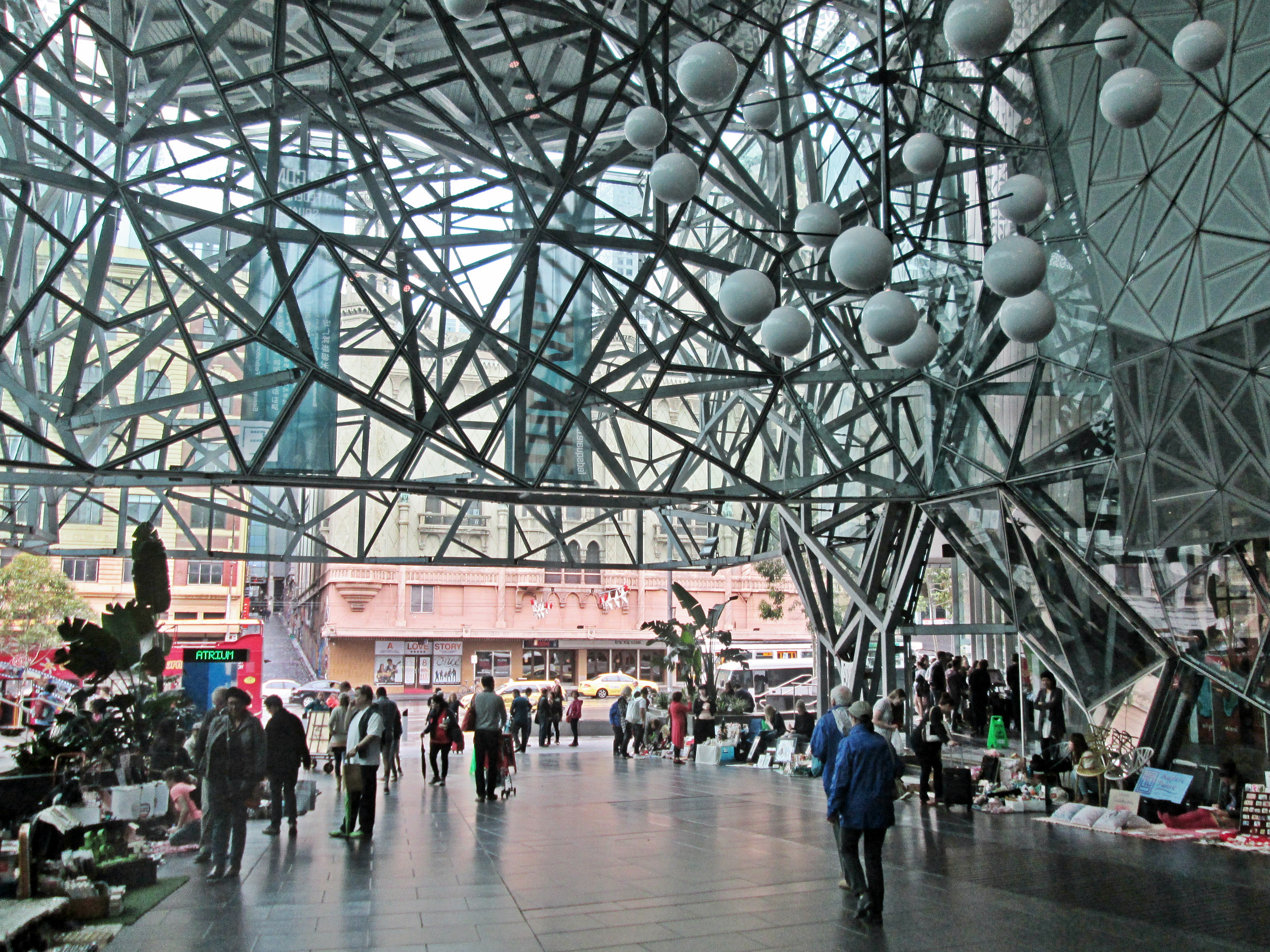
Atrium inside Federation Square

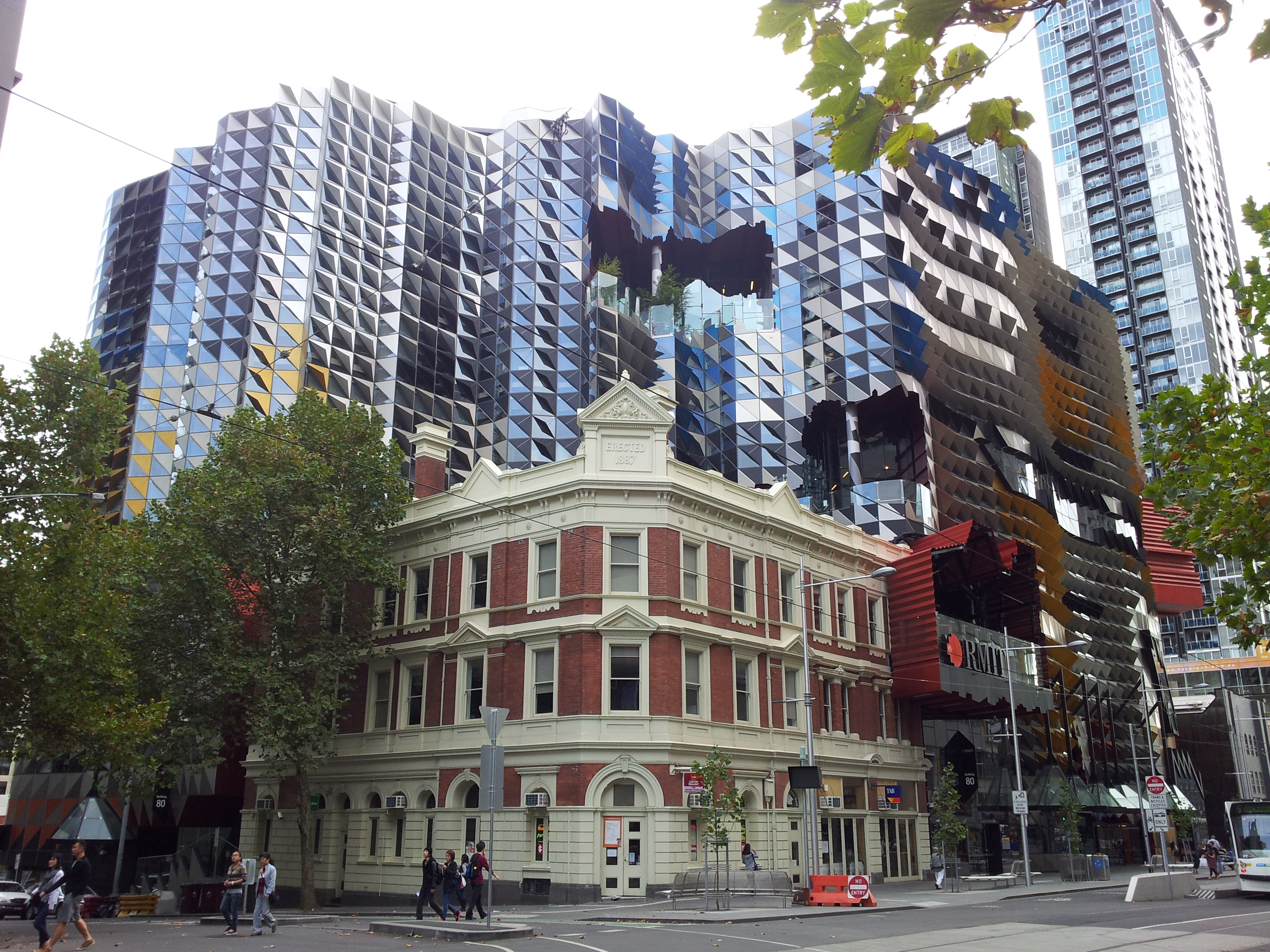
SAB with a Victorian era building in the foreground

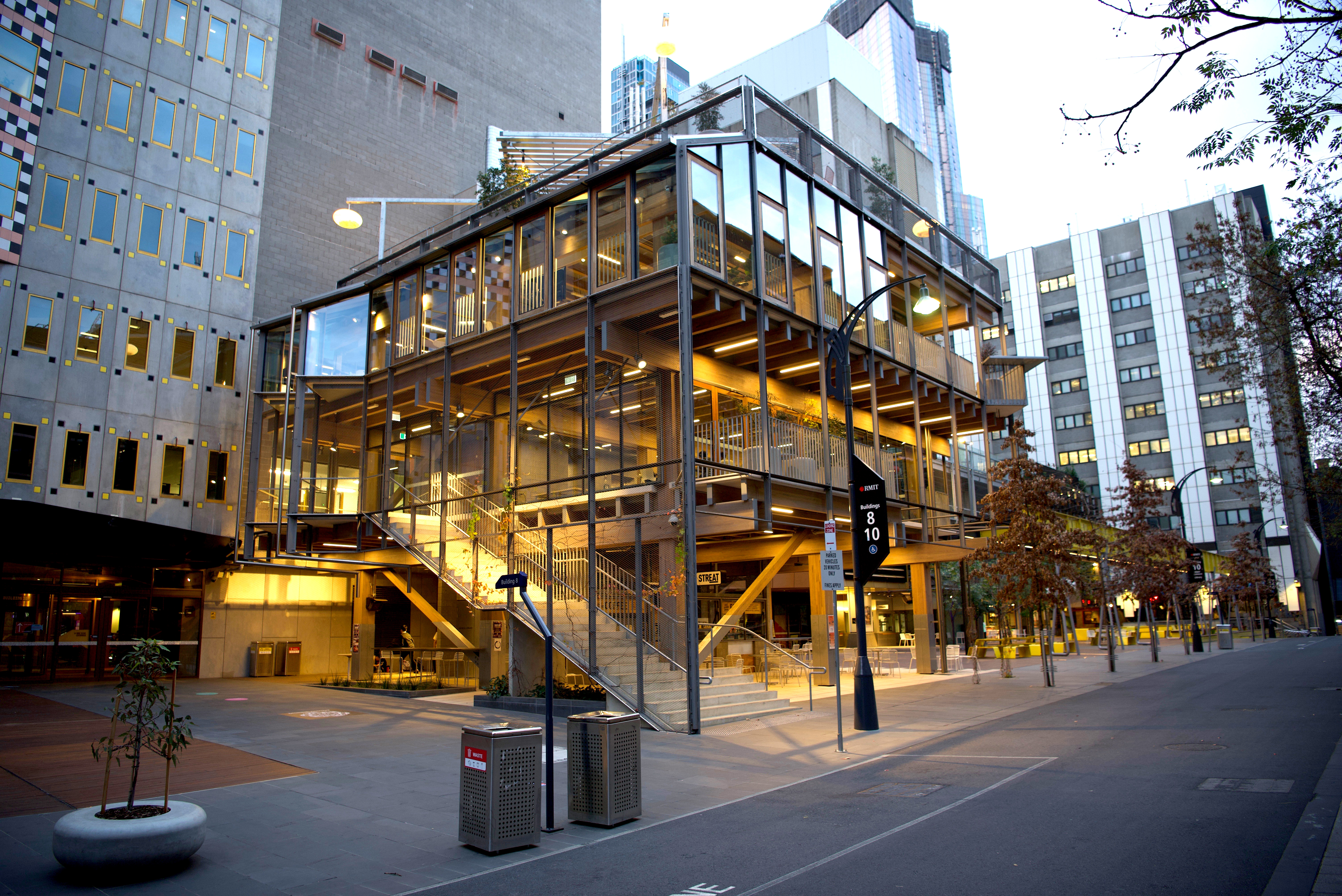
Garden Building, RMIT University

== Monuments and structures ==
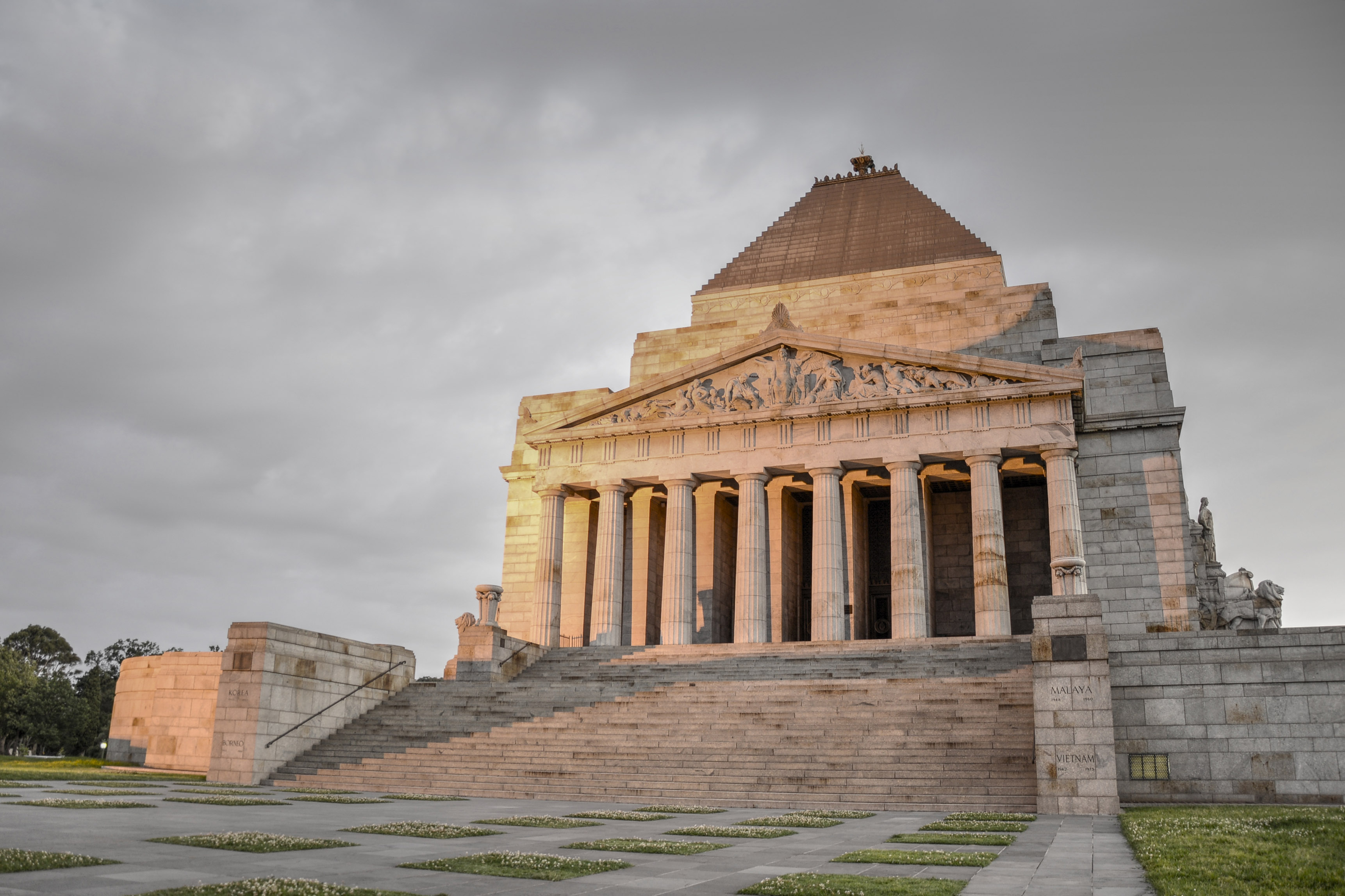
Shrine of Remembrance in Kings Domain

Melbourne's metropolitan area is dotted with structures and memorials dedicated to various different historical events of significance. Perhaps the most notable, located in Kings Domain, is the Shrine of Remembrance, an art deco monument originally built to honour the men and women who served in the First World War, but now seen as a symbol for all Australians involved in war. Designed by architects and World War I veterans Phillip Hudson and James Wardrop, the Shrine is built in a classical style and is based on the Tomb of Mausolus at Halicarnassus and the Parthenon in Athens, Greece. The defining element located at the top of the memorial's ziggurat roof is based on the Choragic Monument of Lysicrates. Constructed using Tynong granite, the building once consisted only of the main sanctuary which was surrounded by the ambulatory. The sanctuary contains the marble Stone of Remembrance, which features an inscription stating "Greater love hath no man". Beneath the sanctuary lies a crypt, which contains a bronze statue of a soldier father and son representing two generations, as well as panels listing every unit of the Australian Imperial Force.

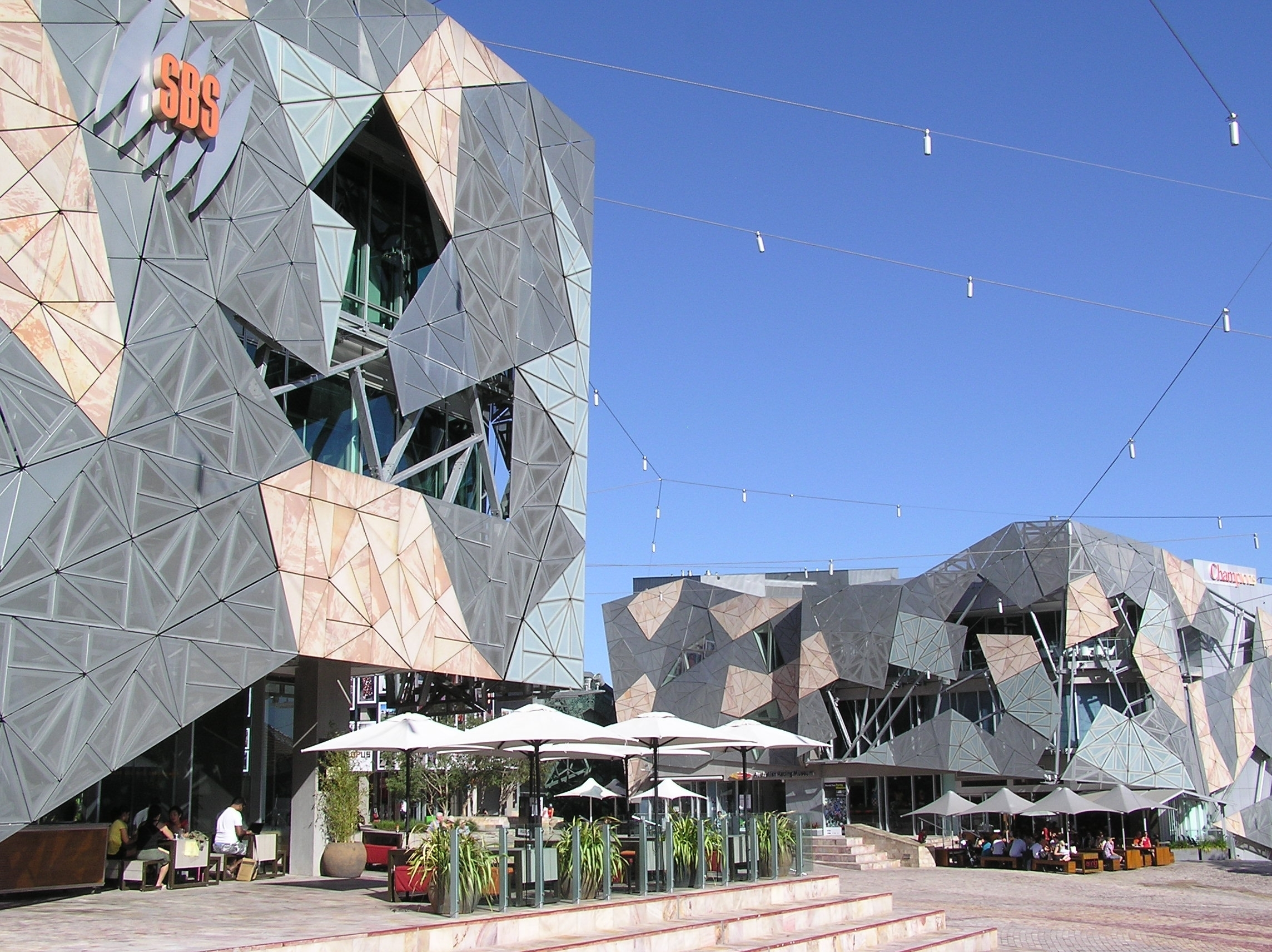
Federation Square

Federation Square, built on a concrete deck above railway lines, covering an area of 3.2 hectares (7.9 acres), is a mixed-used development built in the early 2000s. The buildings in the square were designed in a deconstructivist style with modern minimalist shapes. The complex of buildings forms a rough U-shape around the main open-air square, oriented to the west. The eastern end of the square is formed by the glazed walls of The Atrium. While bluestone is used for the majority of the paving in the Atrium and St. Paul's Court, matching footpaths elsewhere in central Melbourne, the main square is paved in 470,000 ochre-coloured sandstone blocks from Western Australia and invokes images of the Outback. The paving is designed as a huge urban artwork, called Nearamnew, by Paul Carter and gently rises above street level, containing a number of textual pieces inlaid in its undulating surface. The square also contains a large television screen, which has broadcast a number of national addresses, including a 2007 speech from then Australian Prime Minister Kevin Rudd, making an apology to the Stolen Generation of indigenous Australians. The square houses the Australian Centre for the Moving Image and the SBS Headquarters.

=== Town halls and civic centres ===
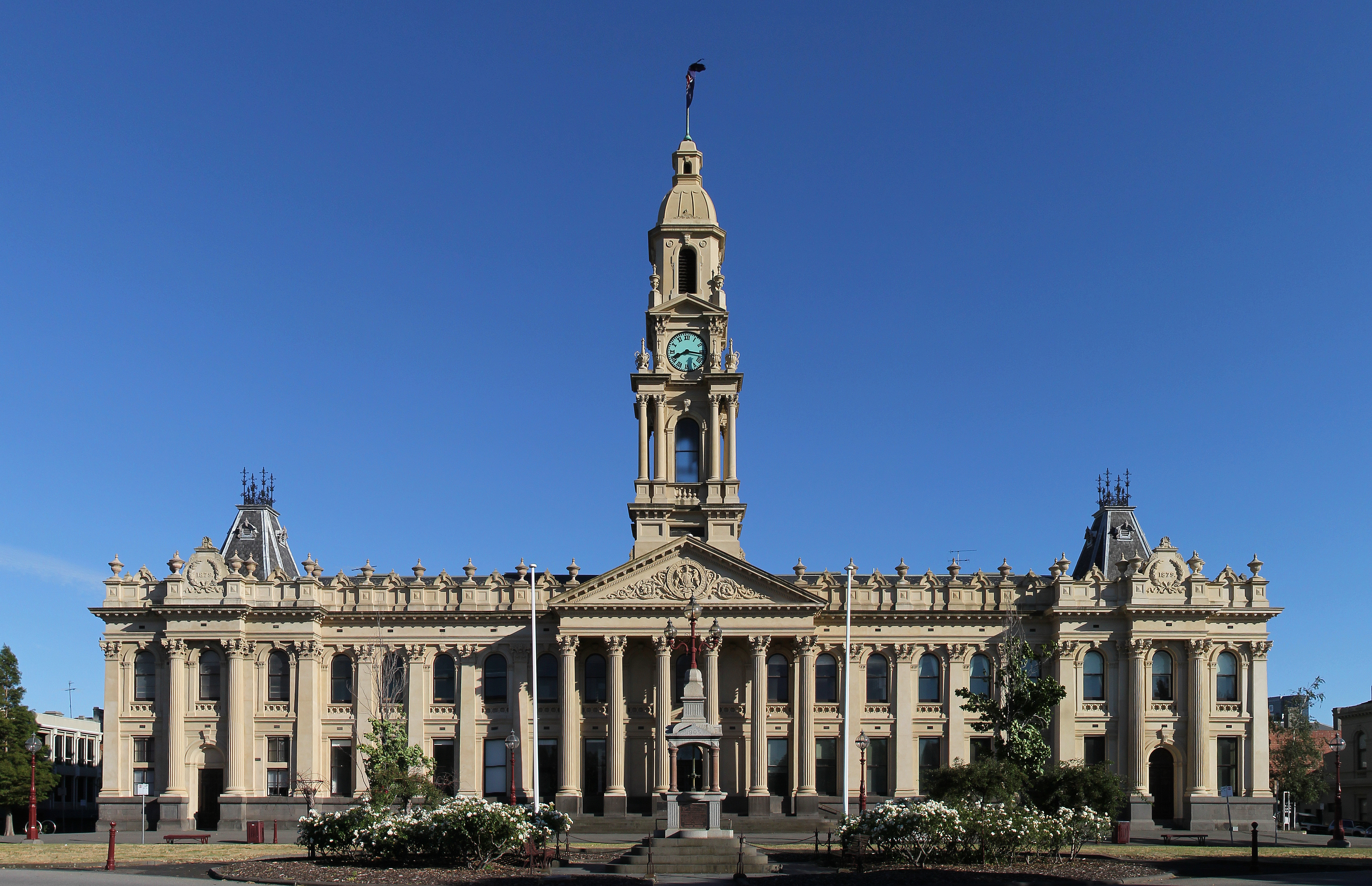
The South Melbourne Town Hall (1879)

Each municipality in Melbourne is represented by its own town hall. The City of Melbourne's central municipal building is located on the northeast corner of Swanston and Collins Streets–it is the oldest town hall in Melbourne's metropolitan area, constructed in 1887 in Second Empire style, by the iconic local architect Joseph Reed and Barnes. The building is topped by Prince Alfred's Tower, named after the Duke. The tower includes a 2.44 m diameter clock, which was started on 31 August 1874, after being presented to the council by the Mayor's son, Vallange Condell. It was built by Smith and Sons of London. The longer of its copper hands measures 1.19 m long, and weighs 8.85 kg. The Main Auditorium includes a magnificent concert organ, now comprising 147 ranks and 9,568 pipes. The organ was originally built by Hill, Norman & Beard (of England) in 1929 and was recently rebuilt and enlarged by Schantz Organ Company of the United States.

South Melbourne Town Hall, which represented the now amalgamated areas of South Melbourne, Port Melbourne and St Kilda, is one of the second oldest town hall's and civic centres built in Melbourne, completed in 1879 in an elaborate Victorian Academic Classical style with French Second Empire features, dominated by a very tall multi-stage clock tower. The building is on the Victorian Heritage Register.

=== Arcades and laneways ===
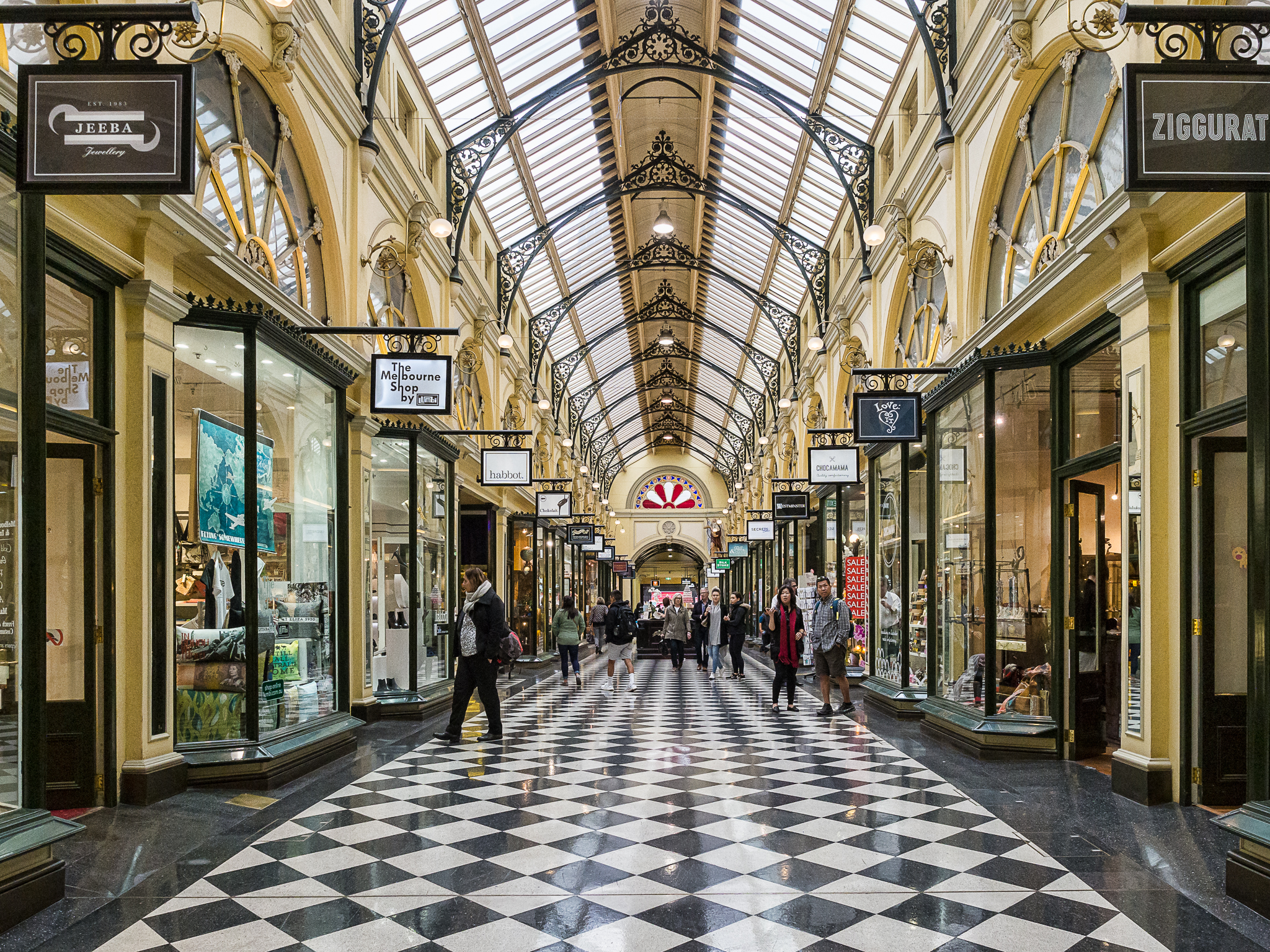
Royal Arcade (1870)

The many laneways and arcades of Melbourne have become internationally famous. Not only to they boast national cultural significance in Australia, but they have come to collectively represent Melbourne. The abundance of lanes in the Melbourne city centre reflects the town planning of Melbourne–the Hoddle Grid, they originated as service laneways for horses and carts. In some parts of the city, notably the Little Lonsdale area, they were associated with the city's gold-rush era slums. Notable laneways include Centre Place and Degraves Street. Melbourne's numerous shopping arcades reached a peak of popularity in the late-Victorian era and in the interwar years. These notably include Block Place and Royal Arcade. Some notable demolished arcades include Coles Book Arcade and Queens Walk arcade. Cathedral Arcade, in the Nicholas Building (1927), was built in the art deco style and reflects Melbourne's 1920s architecture with glass domes, leadlight, arches, and shopfronts with detailed wood paneling.

Since the 1990s, Melbourne's lanes, particularly the pedestrianised ones, have gentrified. Officialdom has recognised their heritage value, and they attract interest from Australia and around the world. Some of the lanes have become particularly notable for their urban art.

=== Bridges ===
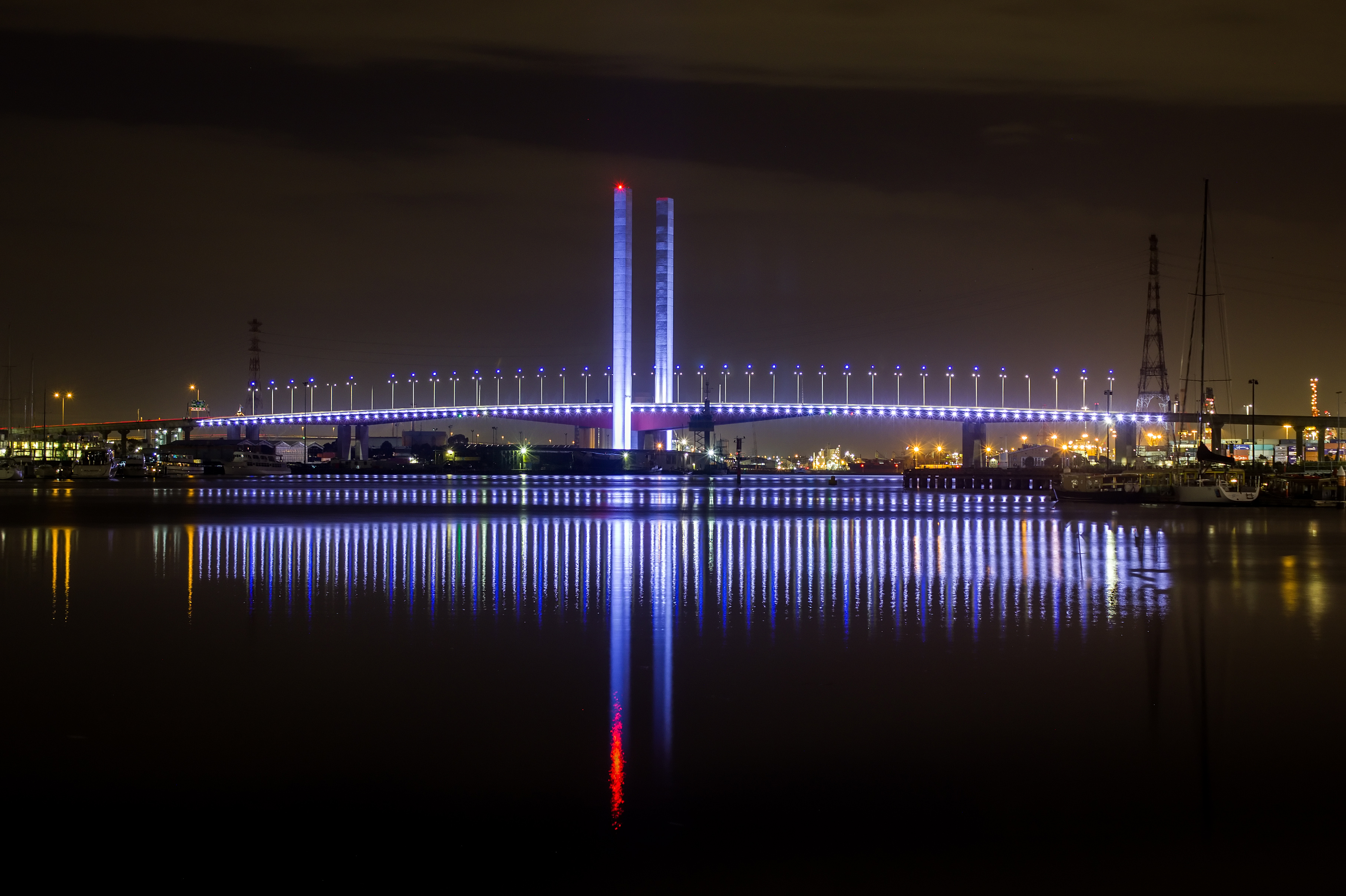
Bolte Bridge (1999)

Melbourne's positioning spanning the Yarra River, and on the coast, necessitates several water crossings. Bolte Bridge, Australia's longest bridge, is a large twin cantilever bridge that spans the Yarra, and Victoria Harbour in the Docklands, to the west of the Melbourne central business district. Bolte Bridge was designed by architects Denton Corker Marshall from 1996 to 1999 at a cost of $75 million. The bridge features two 140 metre high silver (grey concrete) towers, situated on either side of the roadway at the midpoint of the bridge's span. These two towers are an aesthetic addition by the architects, and are not joined to the main body of the bridge. Several other pedestrian bridges that cross the Yarra River, connecting Southbank to the Melbourne city centre were built between the 19th-century and the 1990s. The most notable early multi-purpose crossing of the Yarra is the Princes Bridge, constructed in 1888. A more recent example of a bridge crossing over the Yarra is the Evan Walker Bridge, completed in 1992.

The wrought-iron arch Queens Bridge, one of the oldest remaining bridges in the city, was constructed in 1889 has five wrought iron plate girder spans, and is listed on the Victorian Heritage Register. The bridge was built by contractor David Munro, and replaced a timber footbridge built in 1860. The Morell Bridge, built in 1899, is notable as the first bridge in Victoria that was built using reinforced concrete. The bridge features elaborate decorations on the three arch spans, including prominent dragon motifs as well as ornamental Victorian lights. The gutters on the bridge are cobbled bluestone, with a single lane bitumen strip running down the middle. The Bridge is listed on the Victorian Heritage Register.

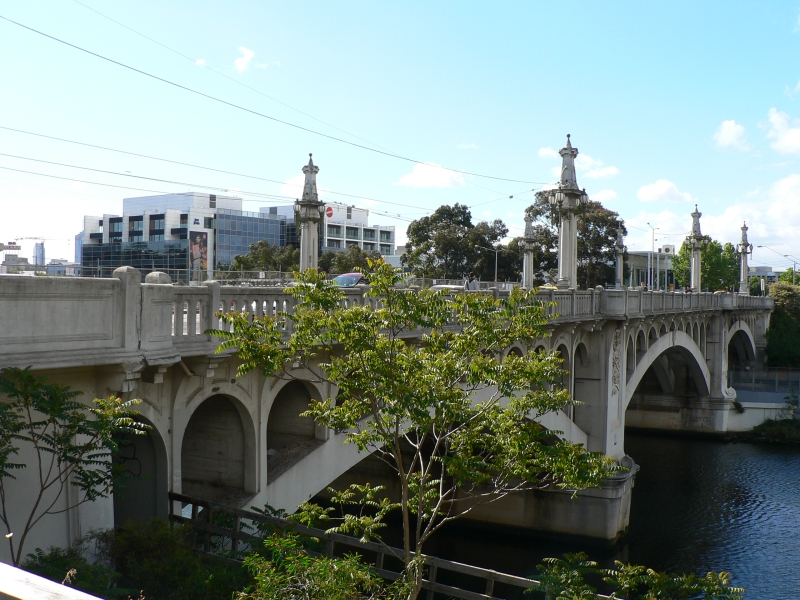
Church Street Bridge

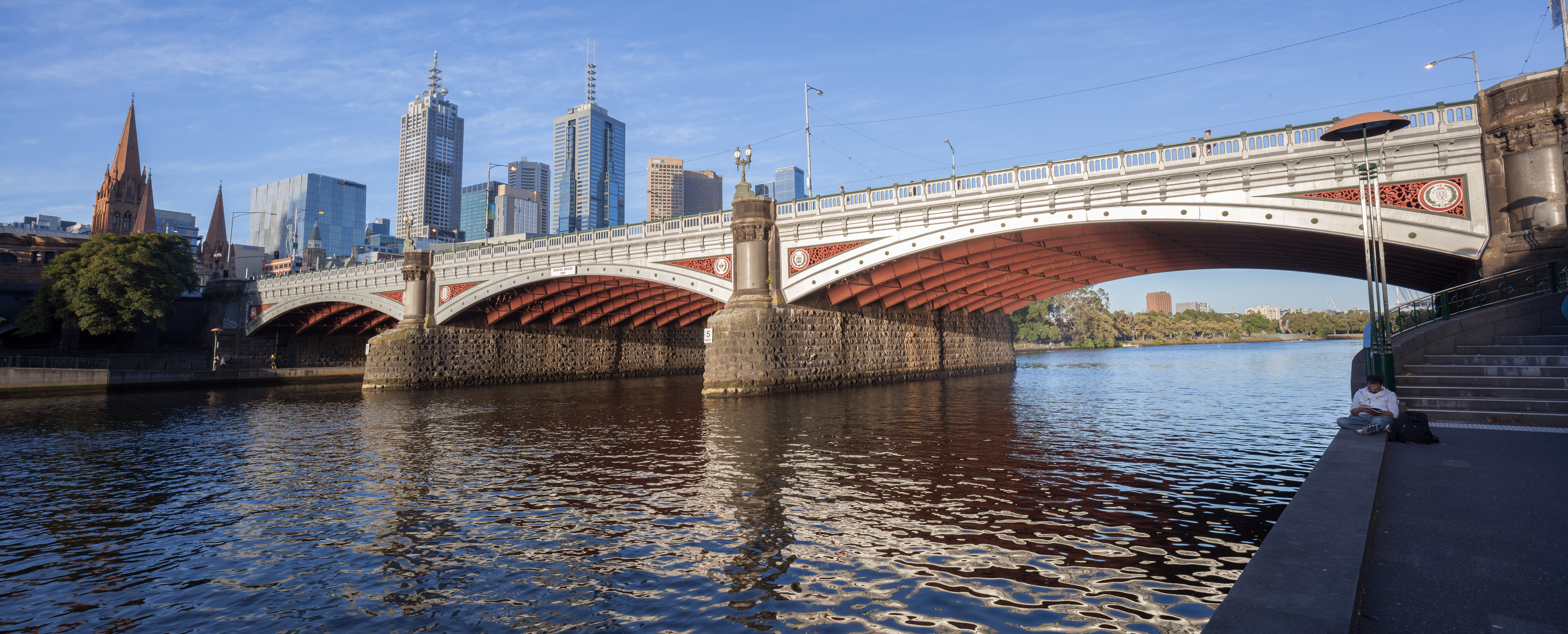
Princes Bridge

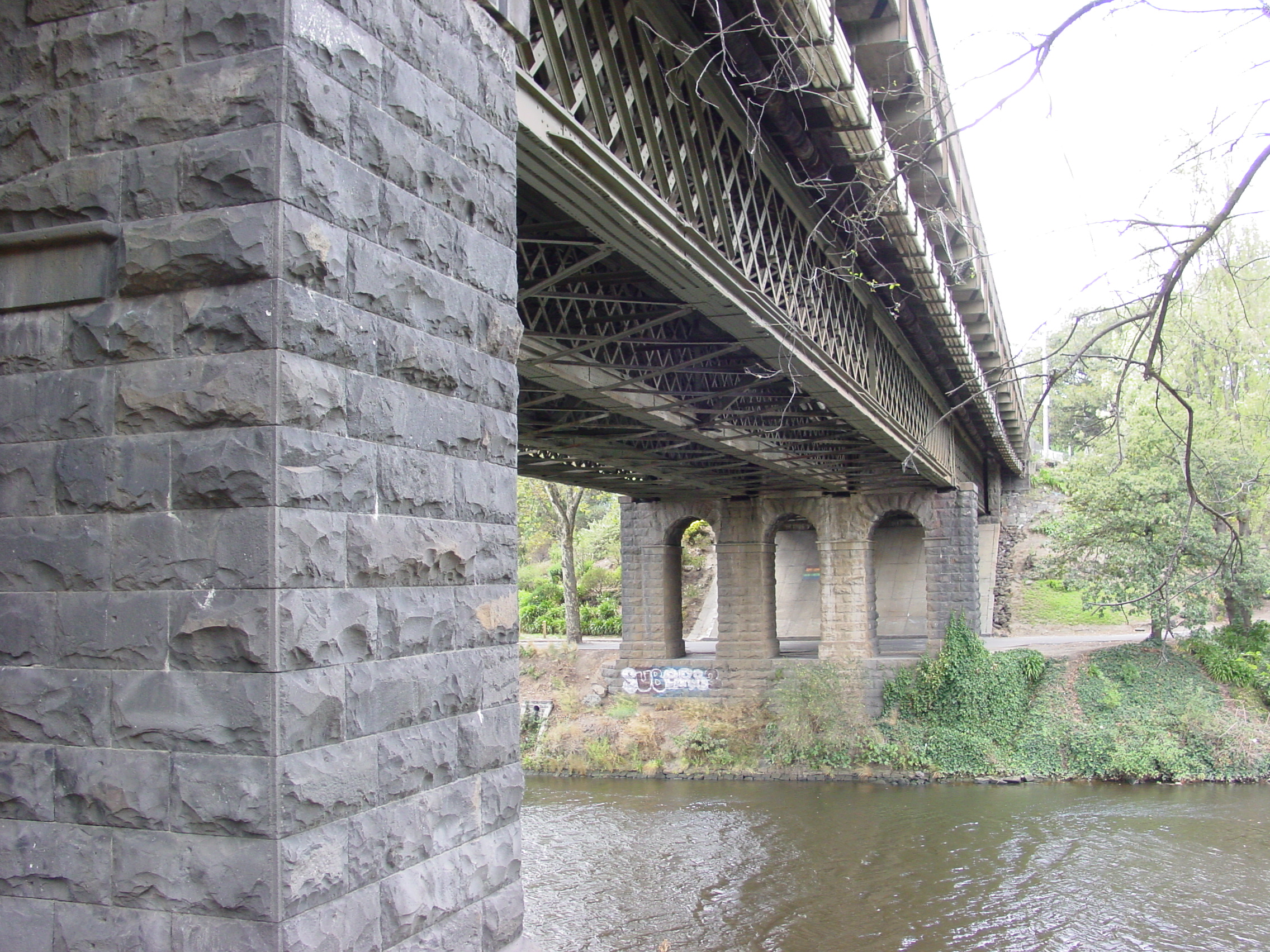
Hawthorn Bridge

== Residential architecture ==
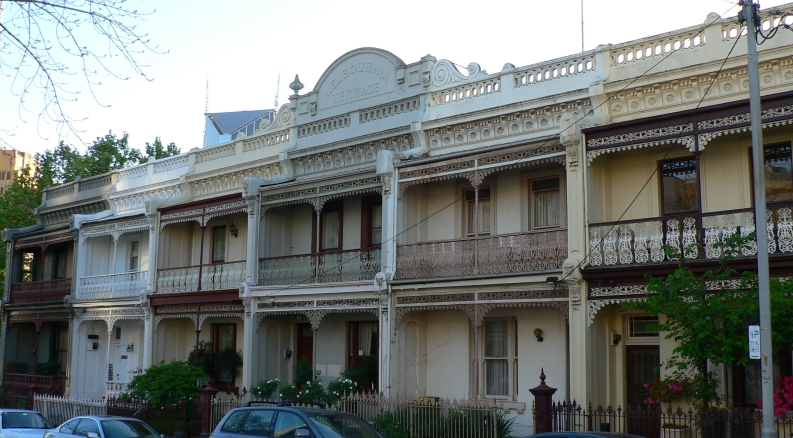
Melbournia Terrace, Carlton, Victoria. Completed in 1877. Rows of terraces built between the 1870s and 1890s with Italianate parapets and iron lacework are typical of the housing built en-masse in the inner suburbs of Melbourne during the land boom

Like many other Australian capital cities, Melbourne's suburbs and residential architecture has been shaped by the city's extensive history–thus it is defined by a variation in style, ranging from elaborate Victorian properties to more contemporary postwar homes. To counter the trend towards low-density suburban residential growth, the government began a series of controversial public housing projects in the inner city by the Housing Commission of Victoria, which resulted in demolition of many neighbourhoods and a proliferation of high-rise towers.

Suburbs in Melbourne's east like Toorak flourished during Melbourne's gold rush era and feature remnants of the prosperous past, as does South Yarra, Malvern. As such, the city contains many homes modelled on English revival styles including classical, Italianate, Tudor and Georgian. Further out from the city suburbs like Camberwell and Caulfield are characterised by Edwardian homes and bungalows. American architects like Frank Lloyd Wright and Louis Sullivan have also had influence on the residential style of Melbourne.

Postwar Melbourne was characterised by a combination of suburban sprawl fueled by the Australian Dream and walk up flats that Robin Boyd described as 'The Australian Ugliness'. Surveys of post-war architecture tended to agree with Boyd's theory that post war, good residential architecture was extremely rare in Melbourne. The Victorian branch of Royal Australian Institute of Architects named their residential architecture award after him. The generic nature of the city's suburban architecture has been both celebrated in such popular culture as 1980s television's 'Neighbours' but also successfully parodied, such as in the 1997 film 'The Castle'. Apartment living was generally frowned upon until the 1990s when the Kennett state government promoted the 1992 planning policies of Postcode 3000 and the 1997 Good Design Guide for Medium-Density Housing to stimulate apartment living closer to the city. However the transformation continual loosening of planning controls to promote higher density has been criticised as resulting in even more bad architecture.

Historically, some of Melbourne's most significant residential architects have been Joseph Reed, John A. B. Koch, Frederick Romberg, Roy Grounds, Robin Boyd and Nonda Katsalidis.

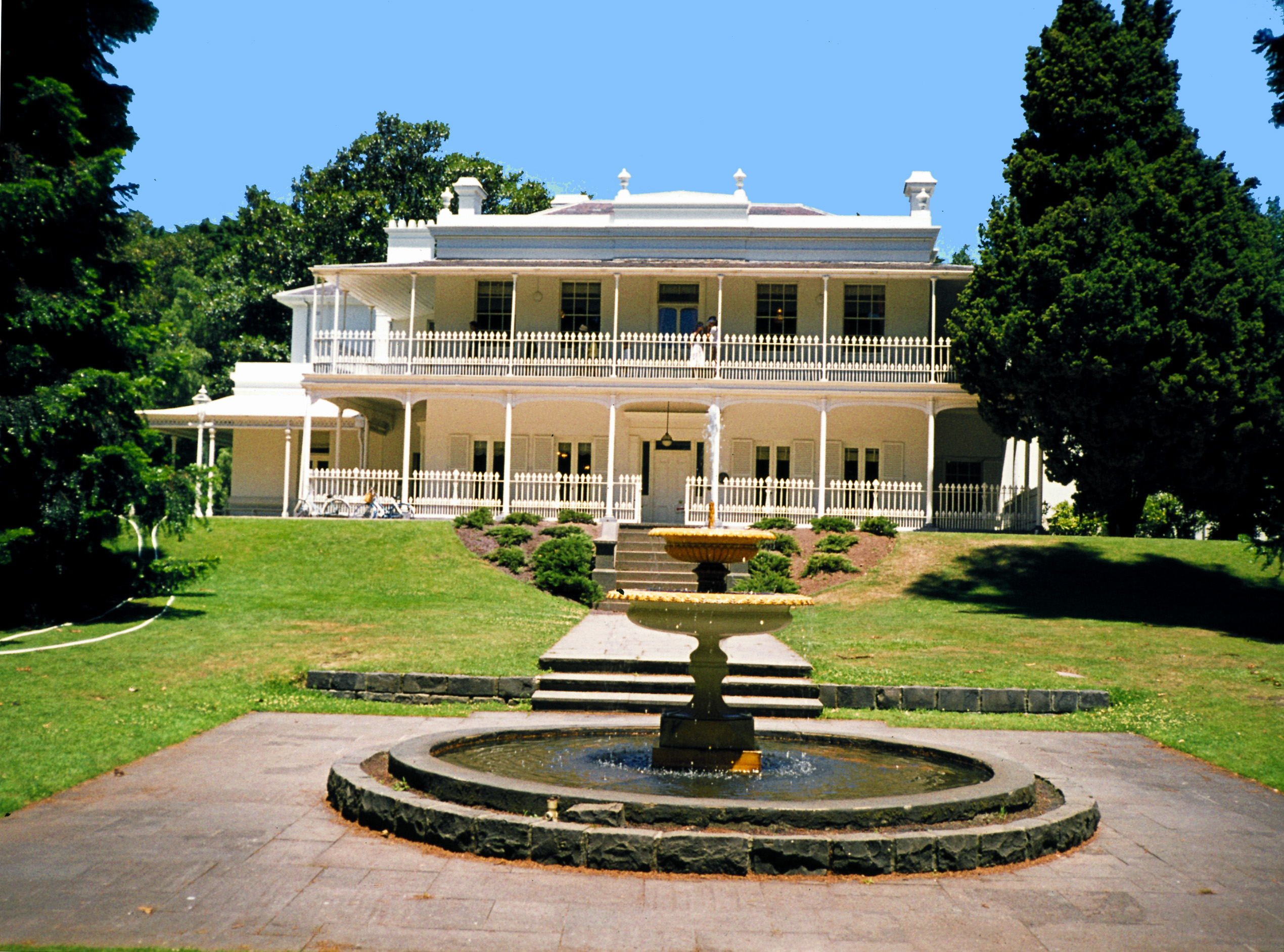
Como House, South Yarra (1847)

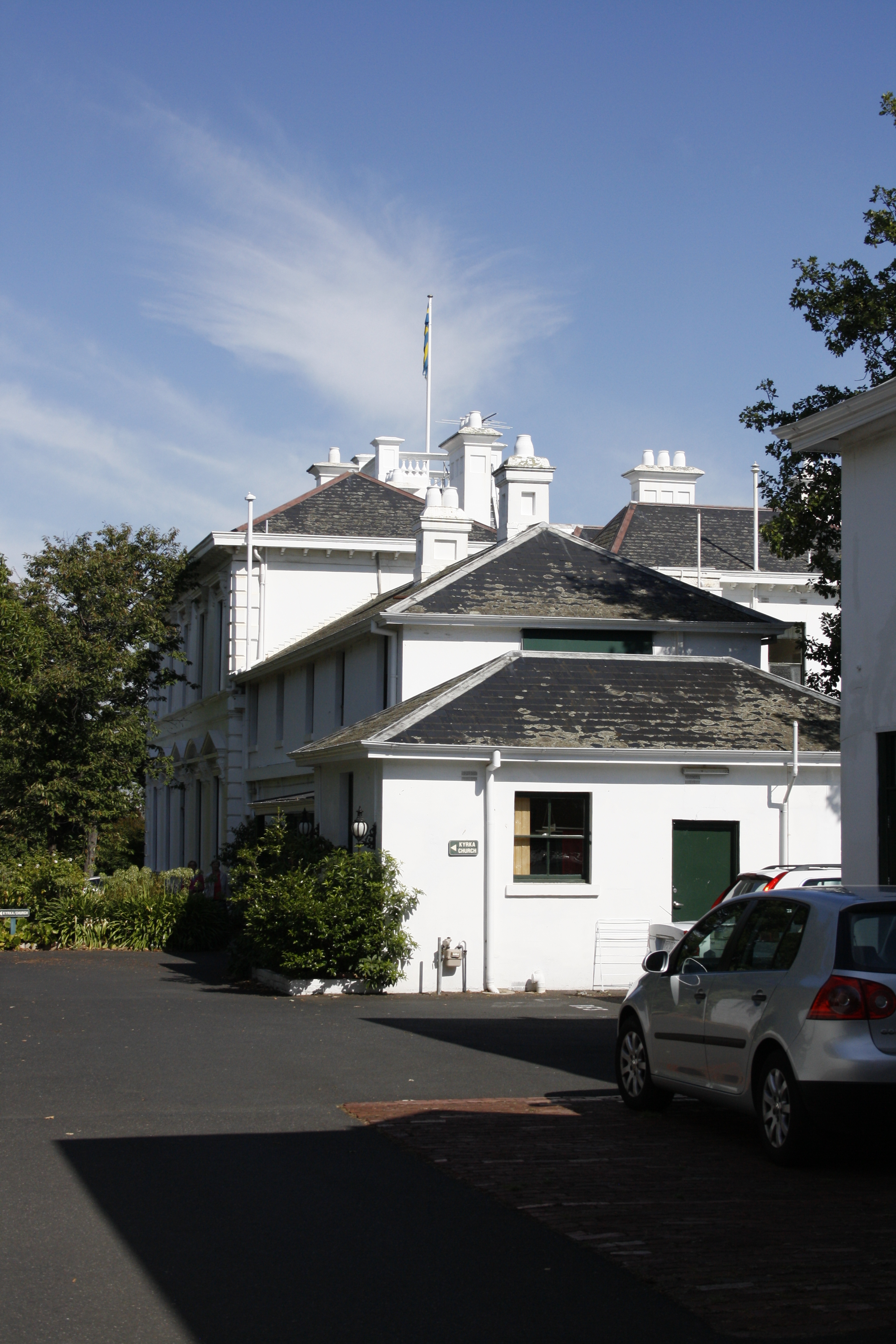
Toorak House, Toorak (1849)

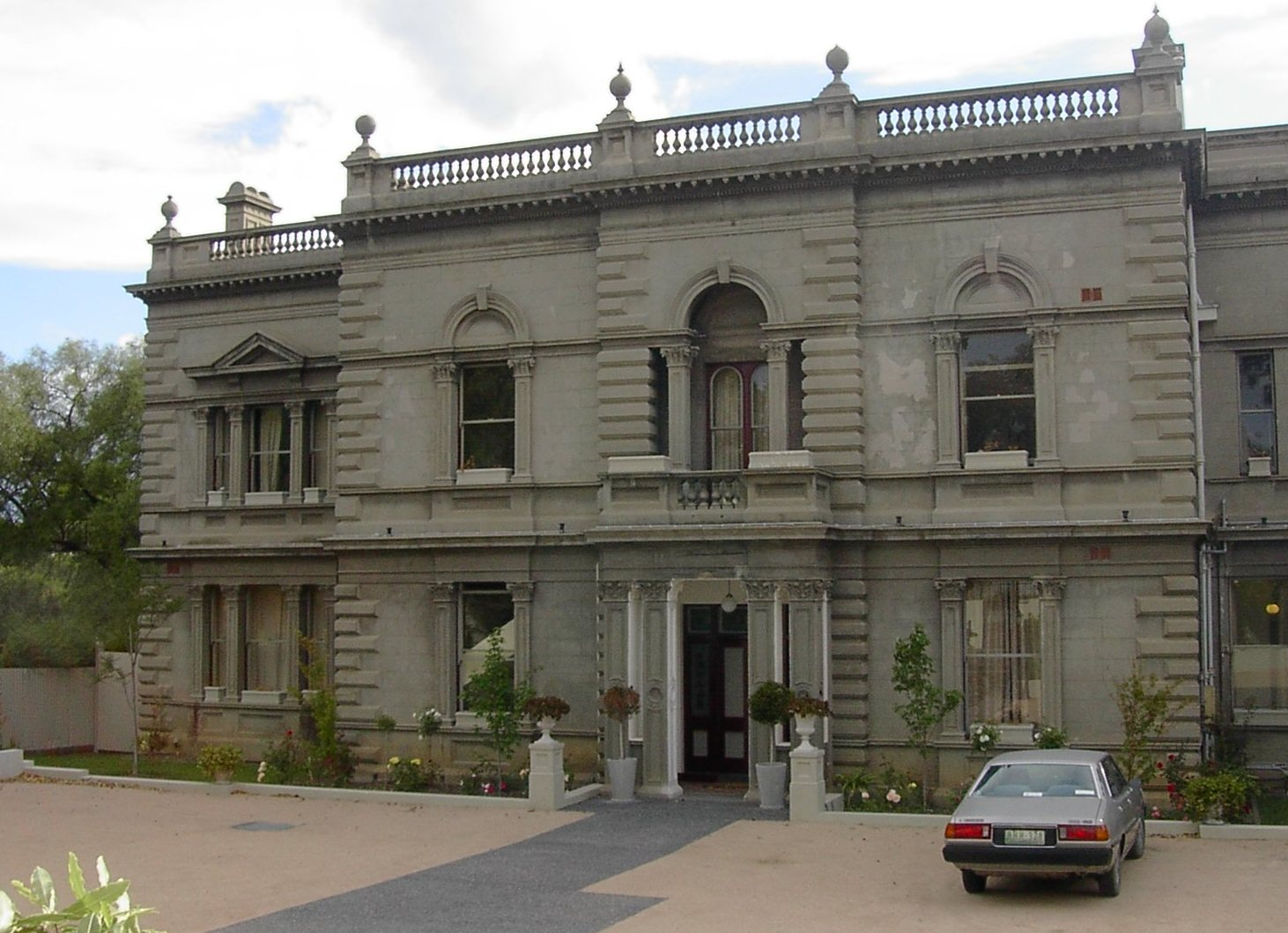
Eildon, St Kilda (1850–1872)

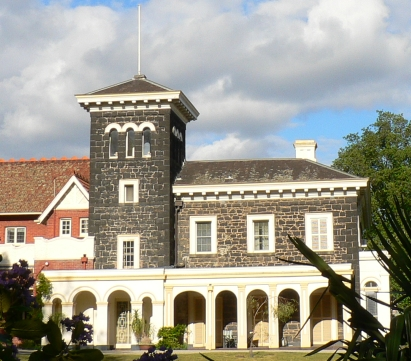
Bishopscourt, East Melbourne (1853)

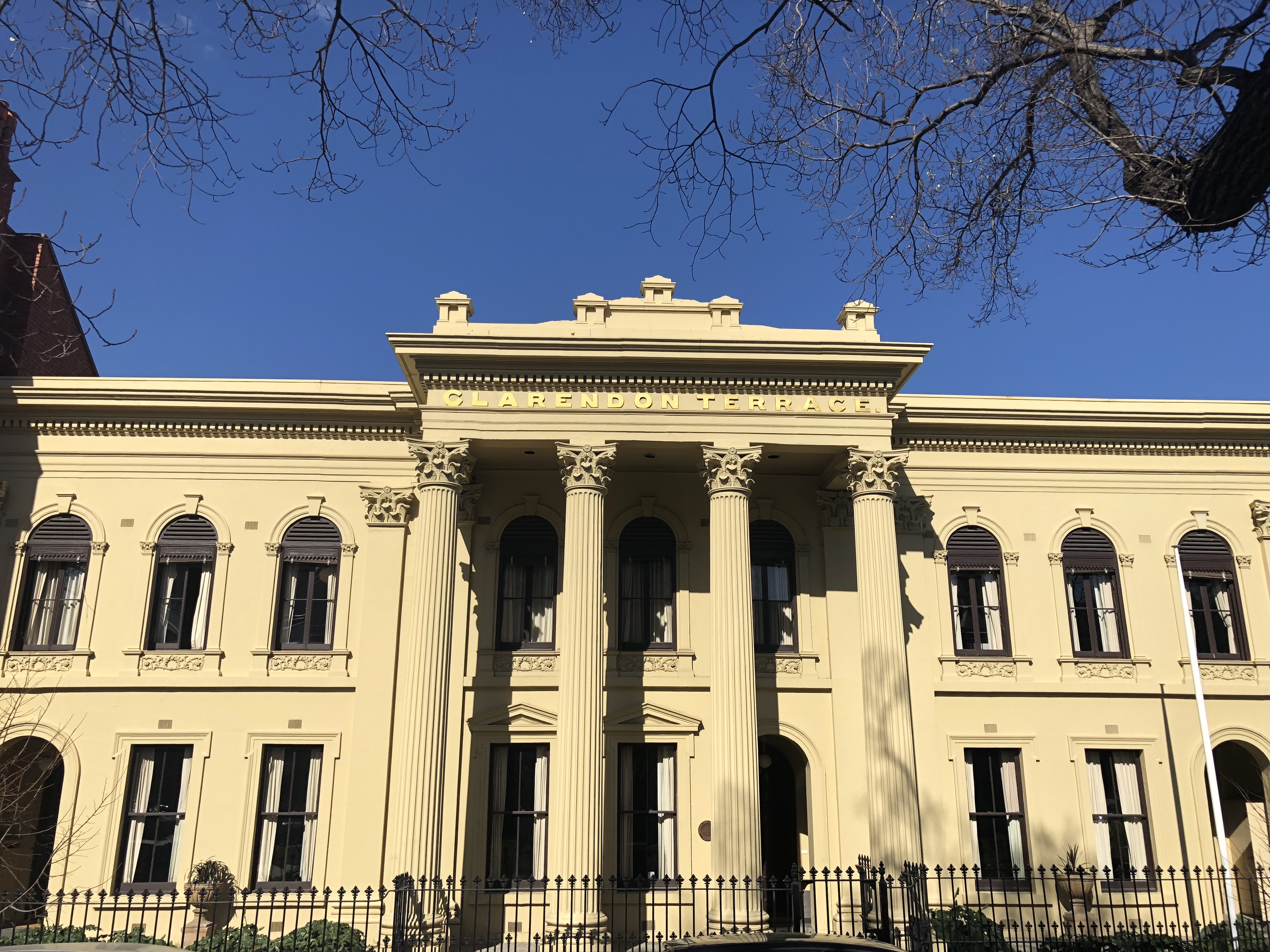
Clarendon Terrace, East Melbourne (1857)

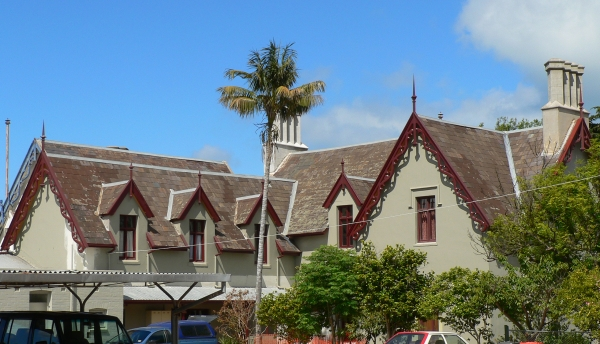
Glenfern, St Kilda (1857)

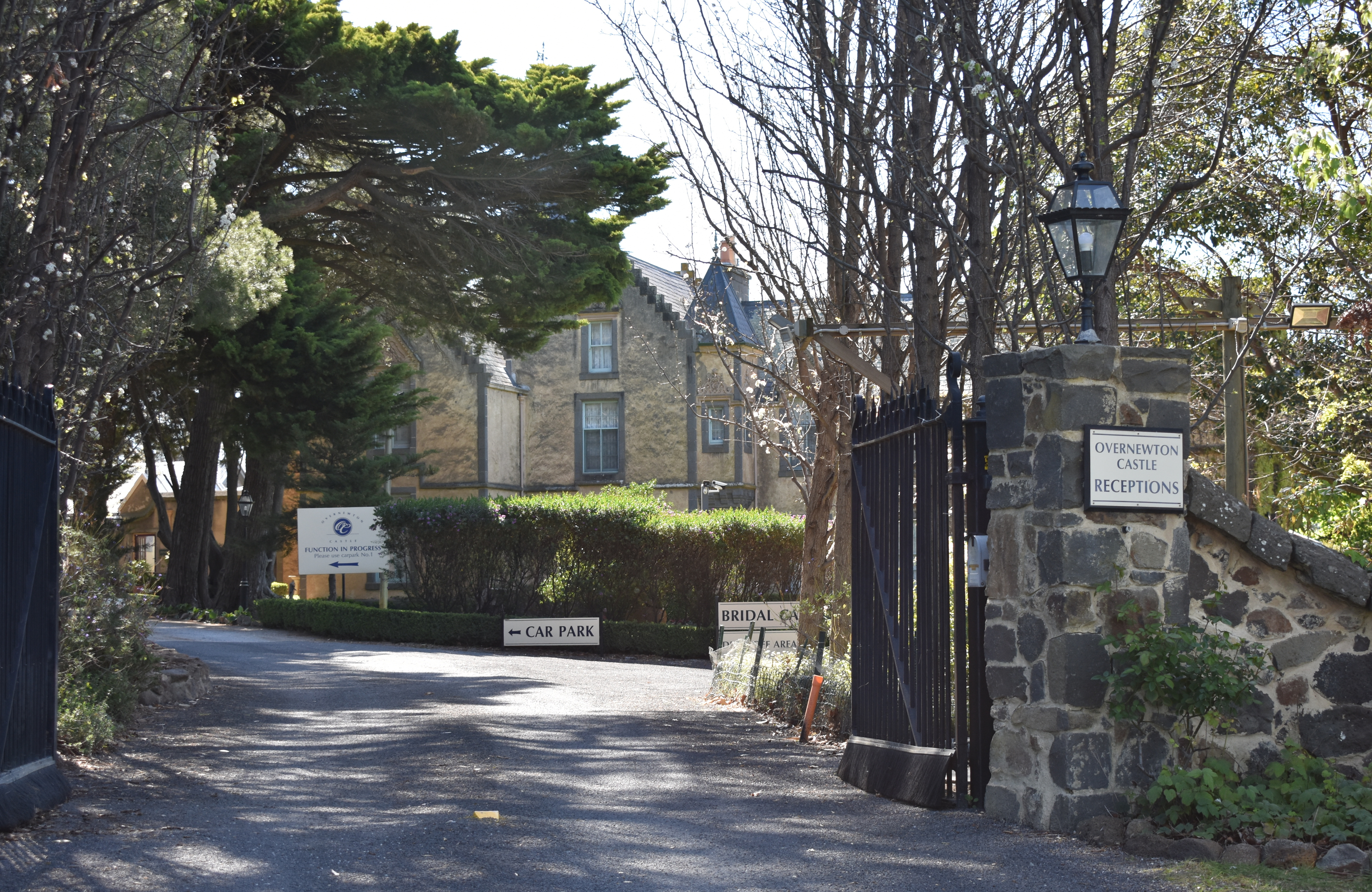
Overnewton Castle, Keilor (1857)

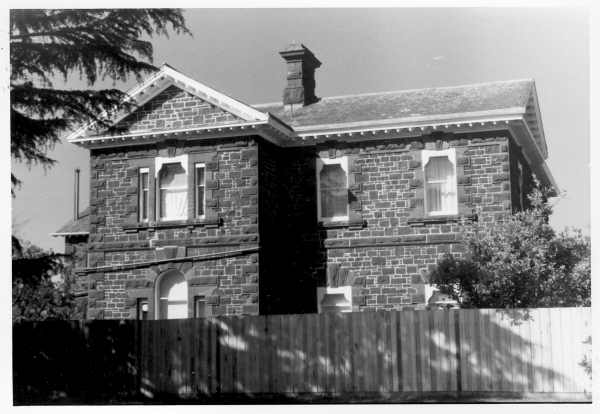
D'Estaville, Kew (1859) Knight & Kerr

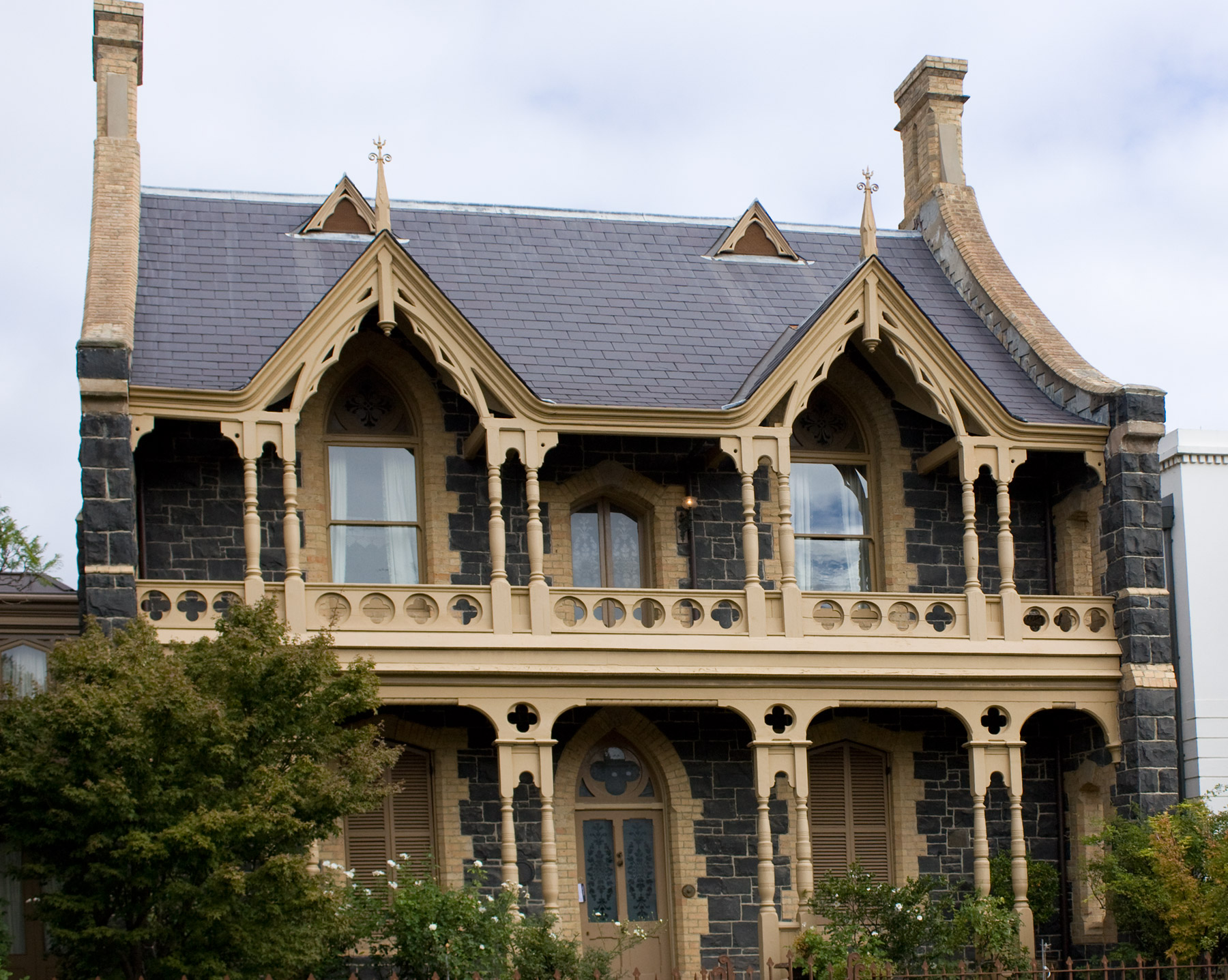
157 Hotham Street, East Melbourne (1861) Joseph Reed

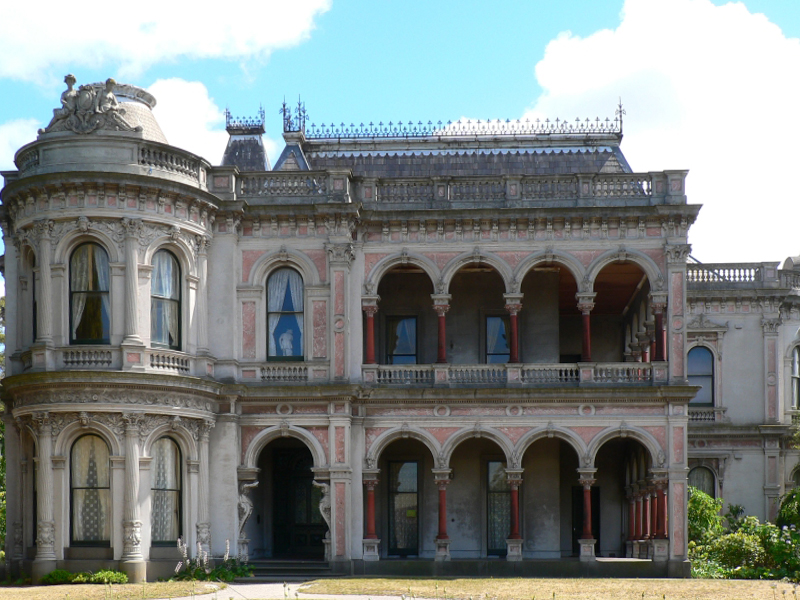
Labassa, North Caulfield (1862–1873)

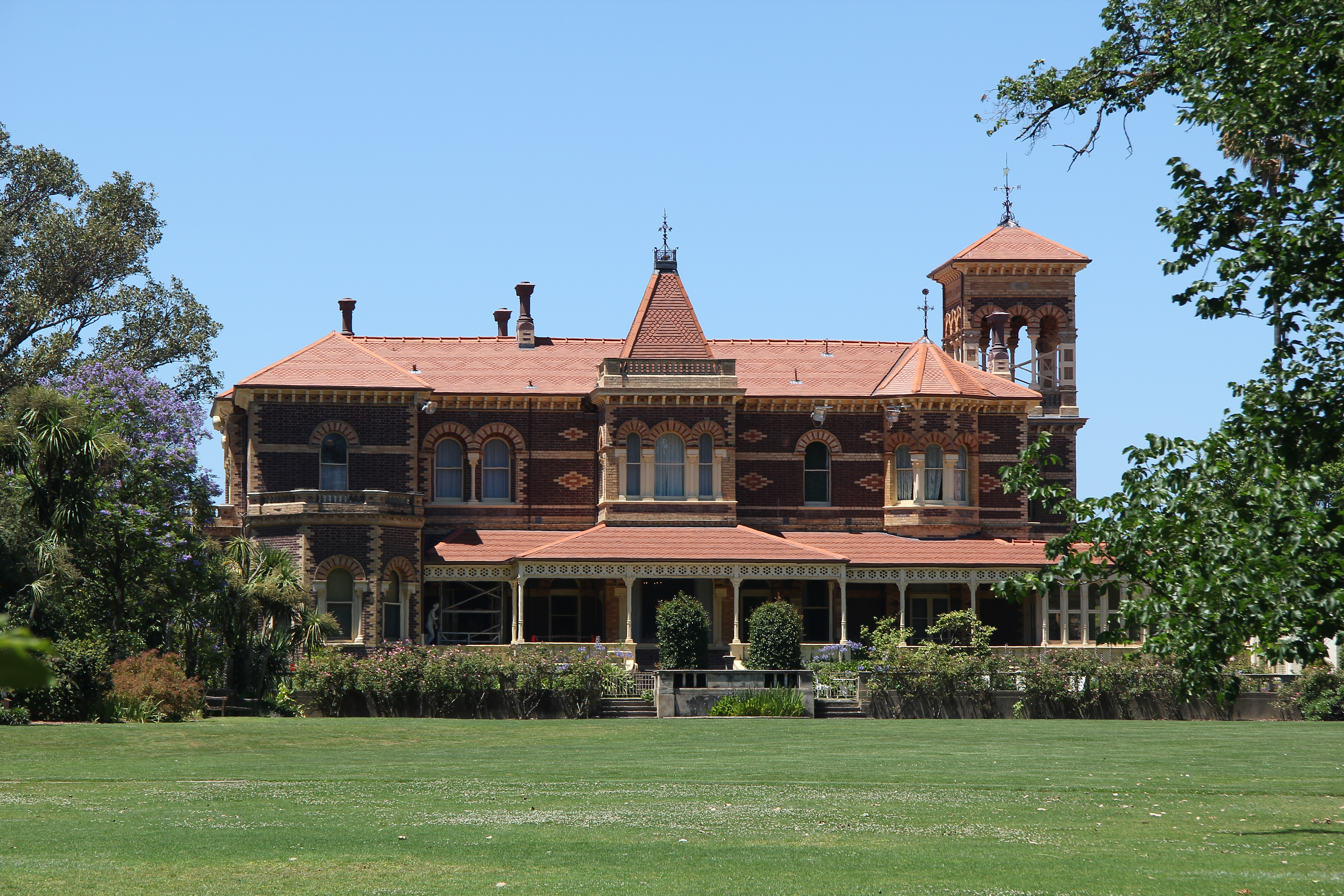
Rippon Lea Estate (1868) Joseph Reed

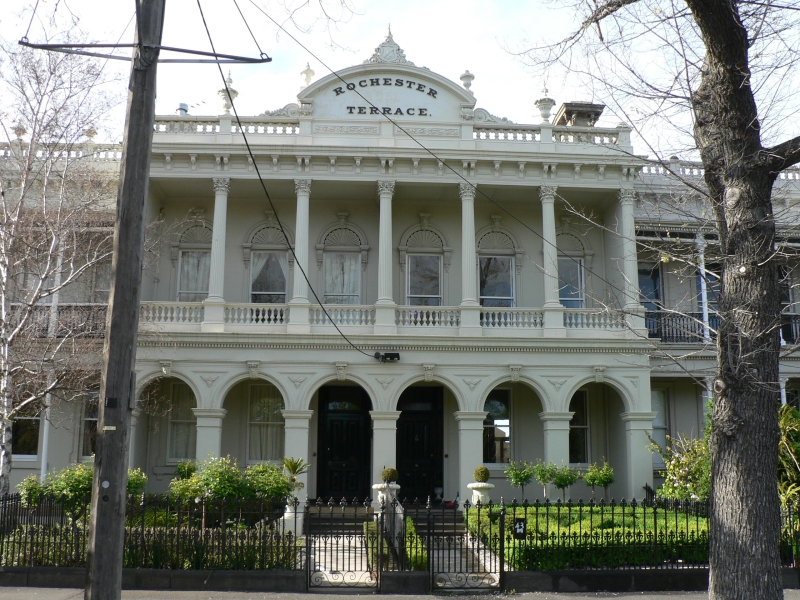
Rochester Terrace, Albert Park (1869–1879)

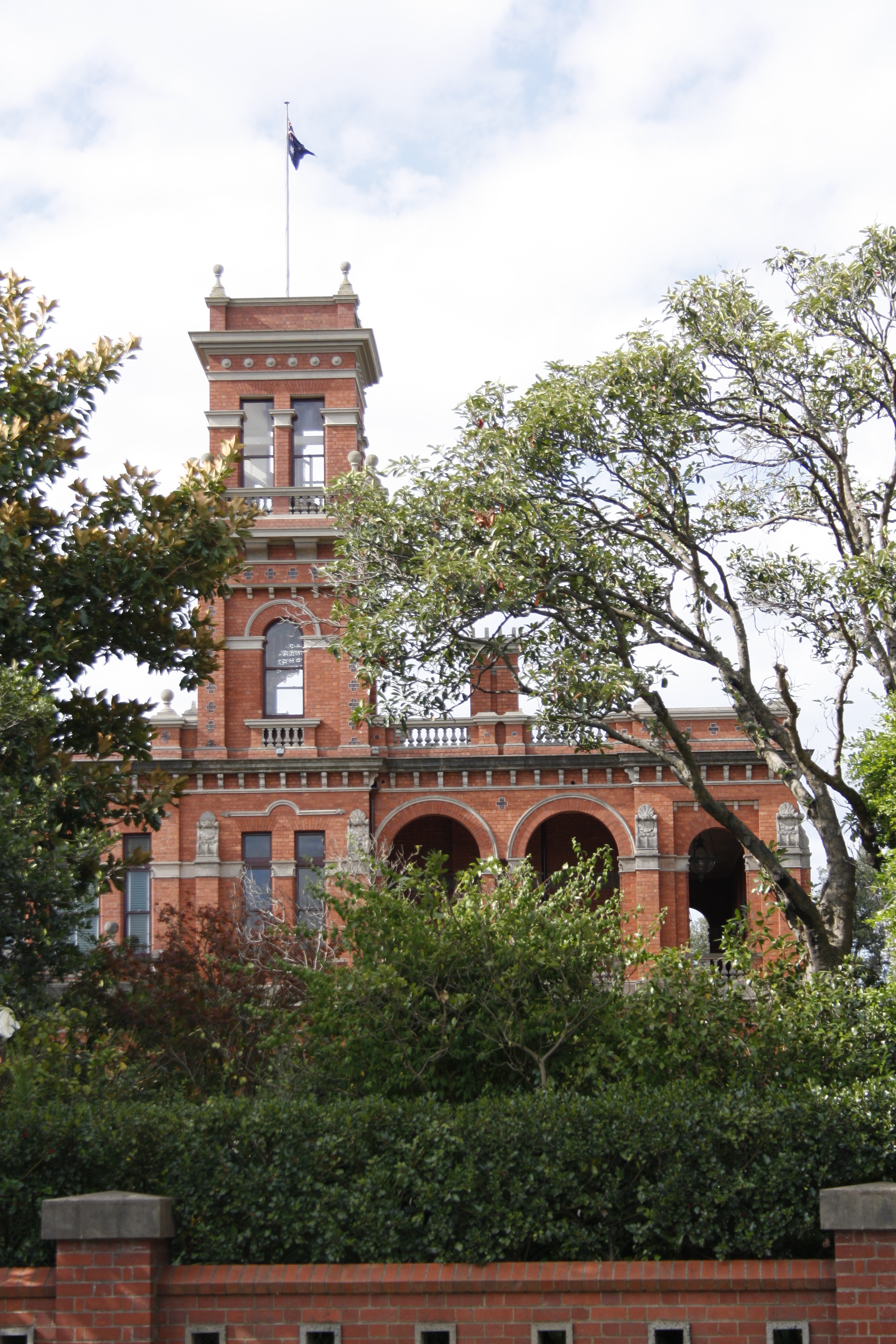
Raheen, Kew (1870)

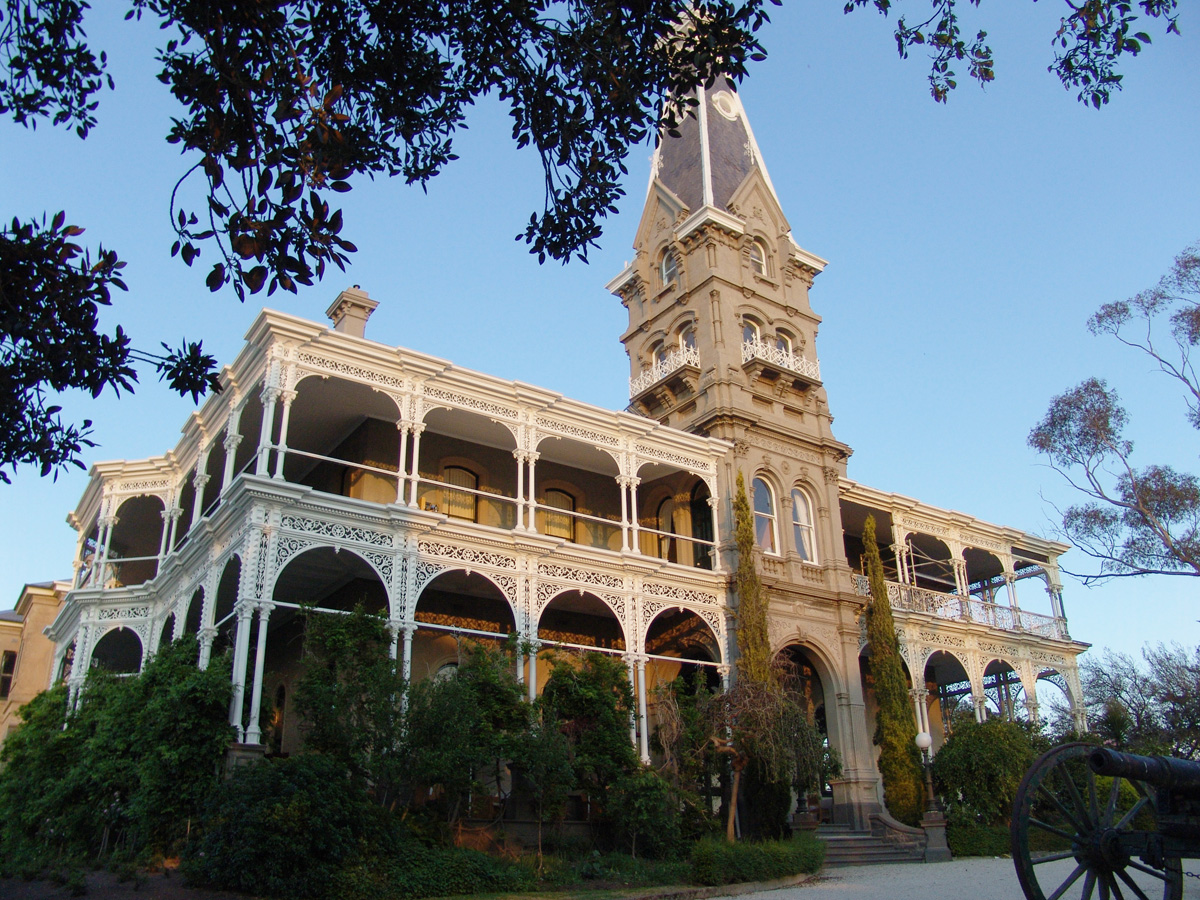
Rupertswood, Sunbury (1874–1876)

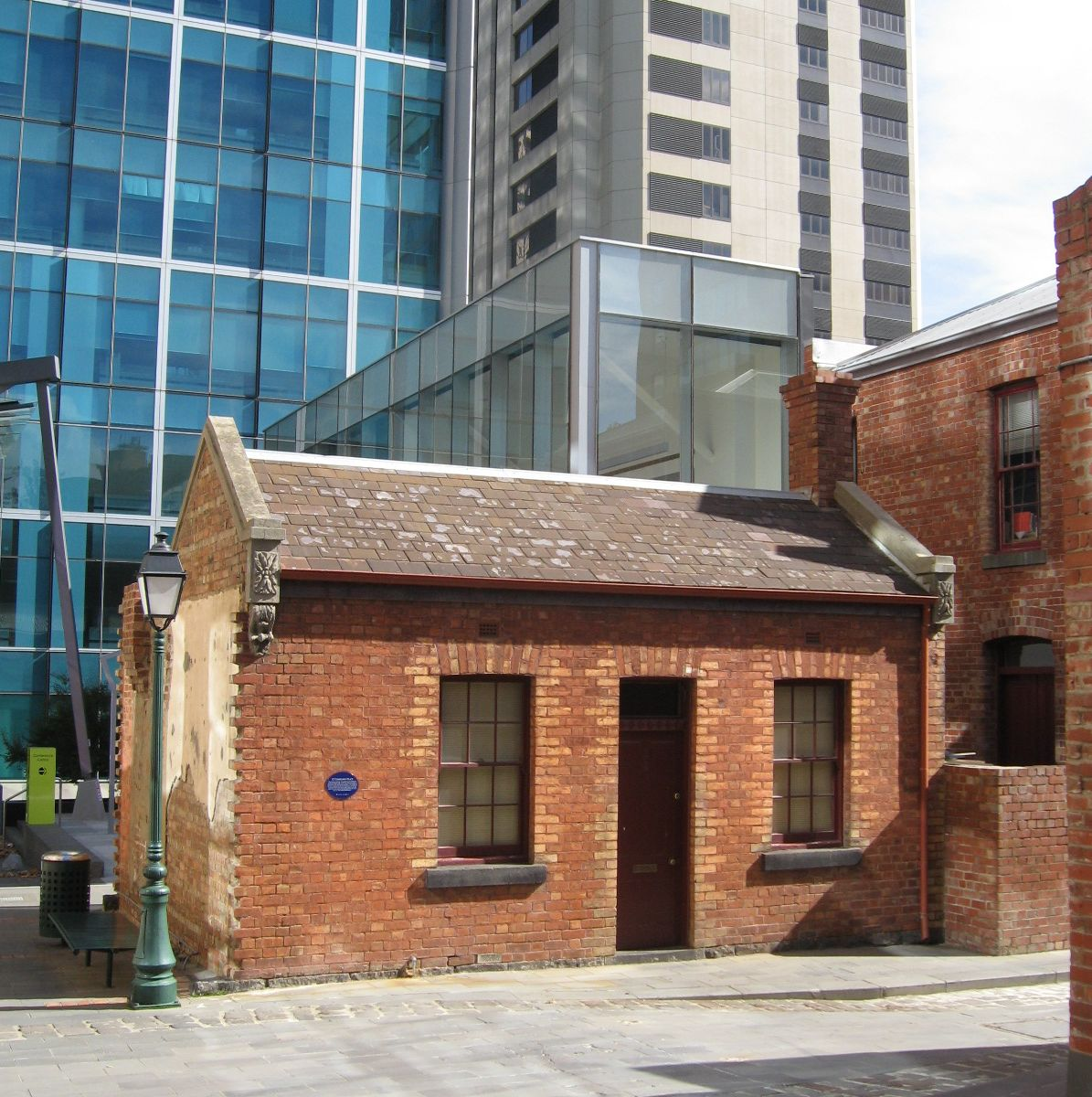
17 Casseldon Place, Little Lon district (1877)

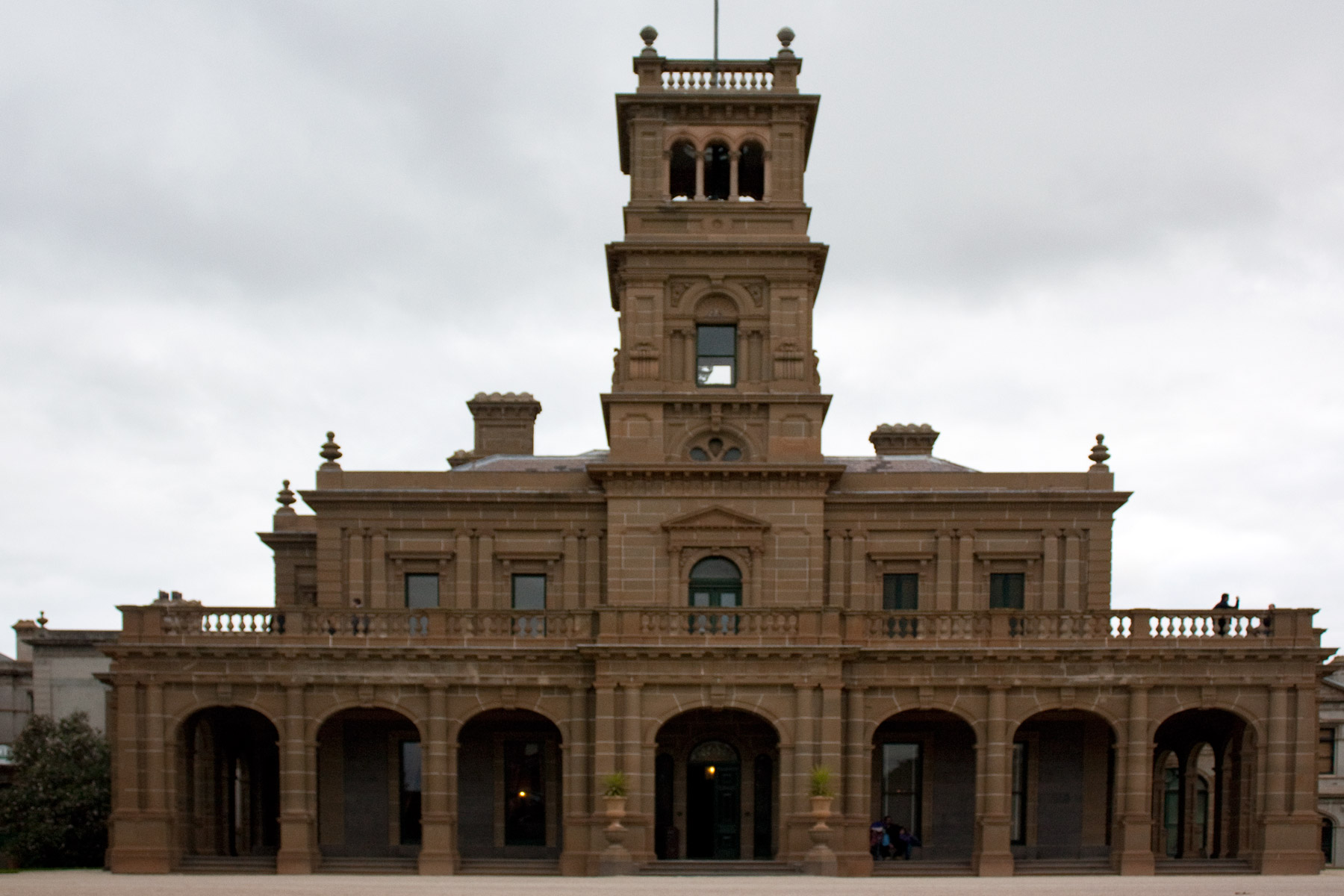
Werribee Park (1874–1877)

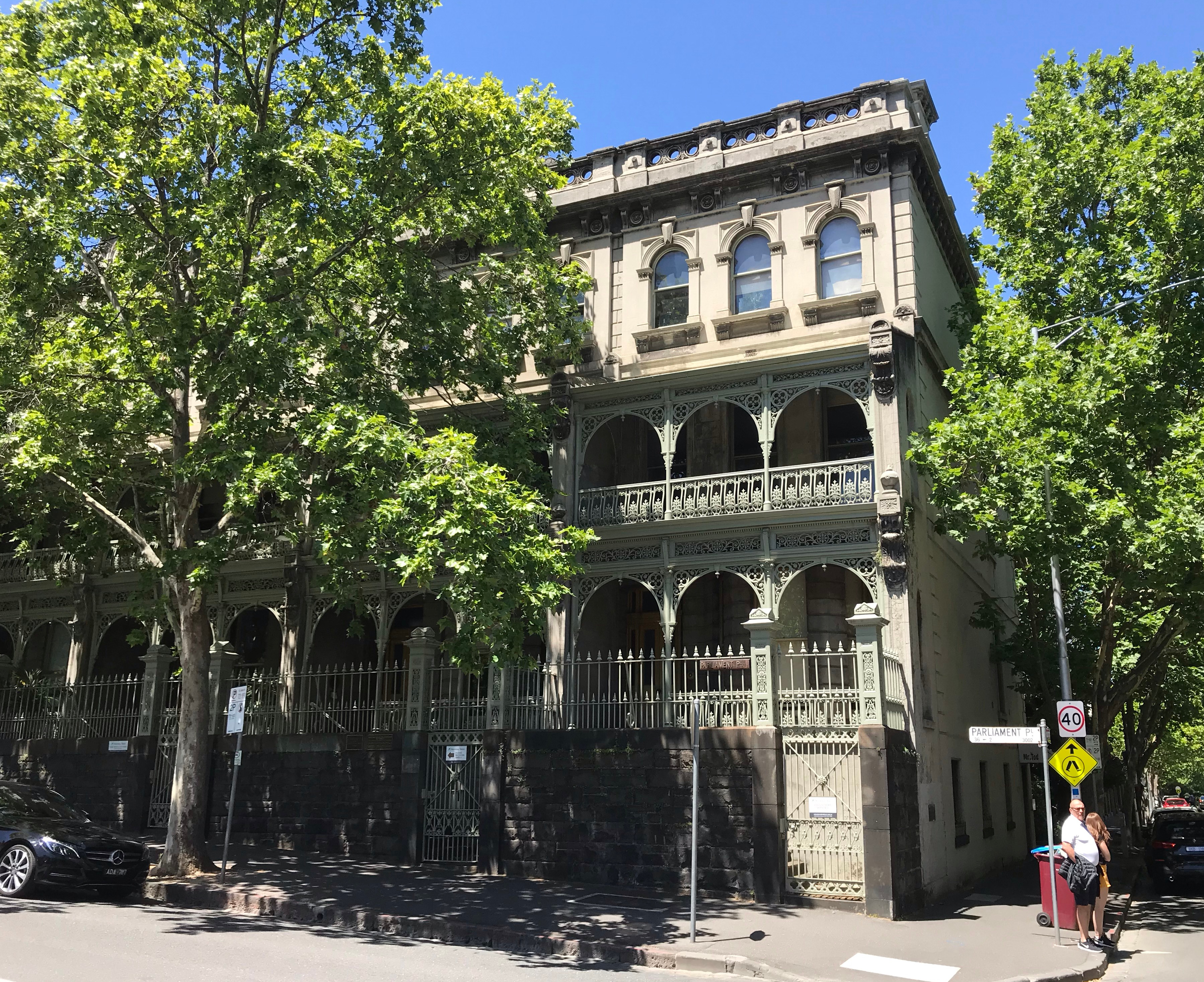
Tasma Terrace, East Melbourne (1877)

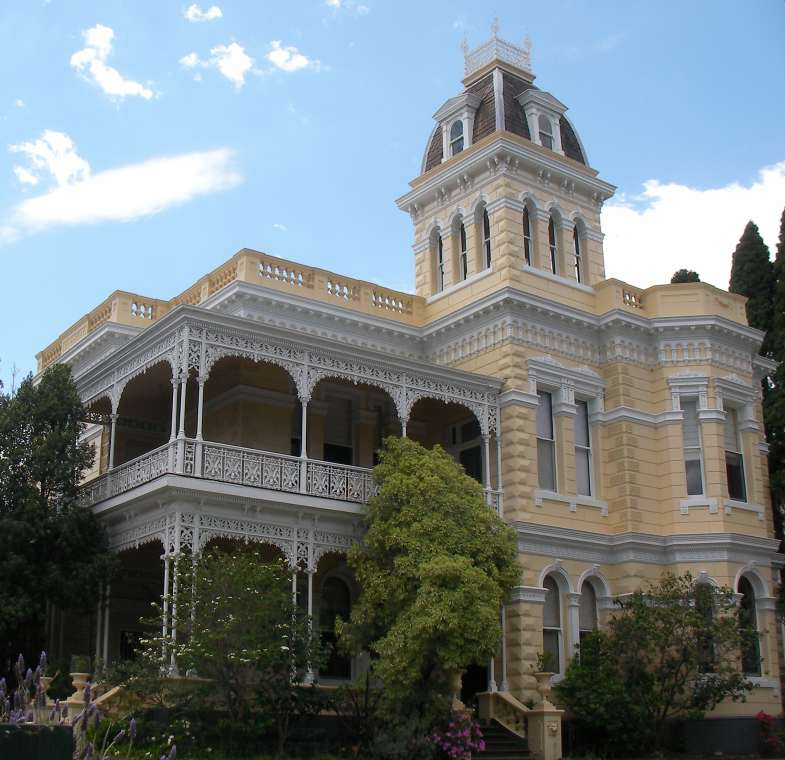
Goodrest, South Yarra (1884)

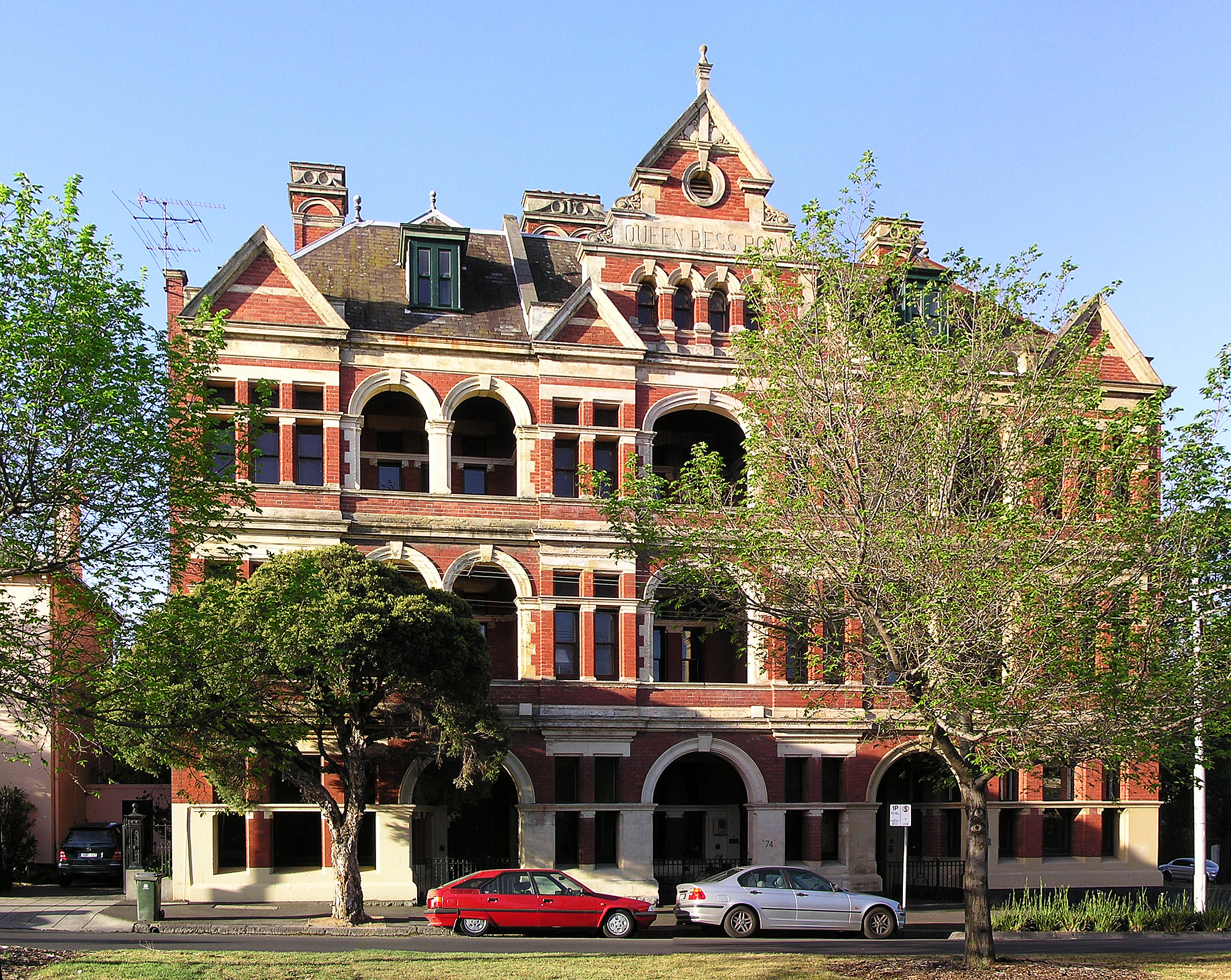
Queens Bess Row, East Melbourne (1886) Tappin Gilbert and Dennehy

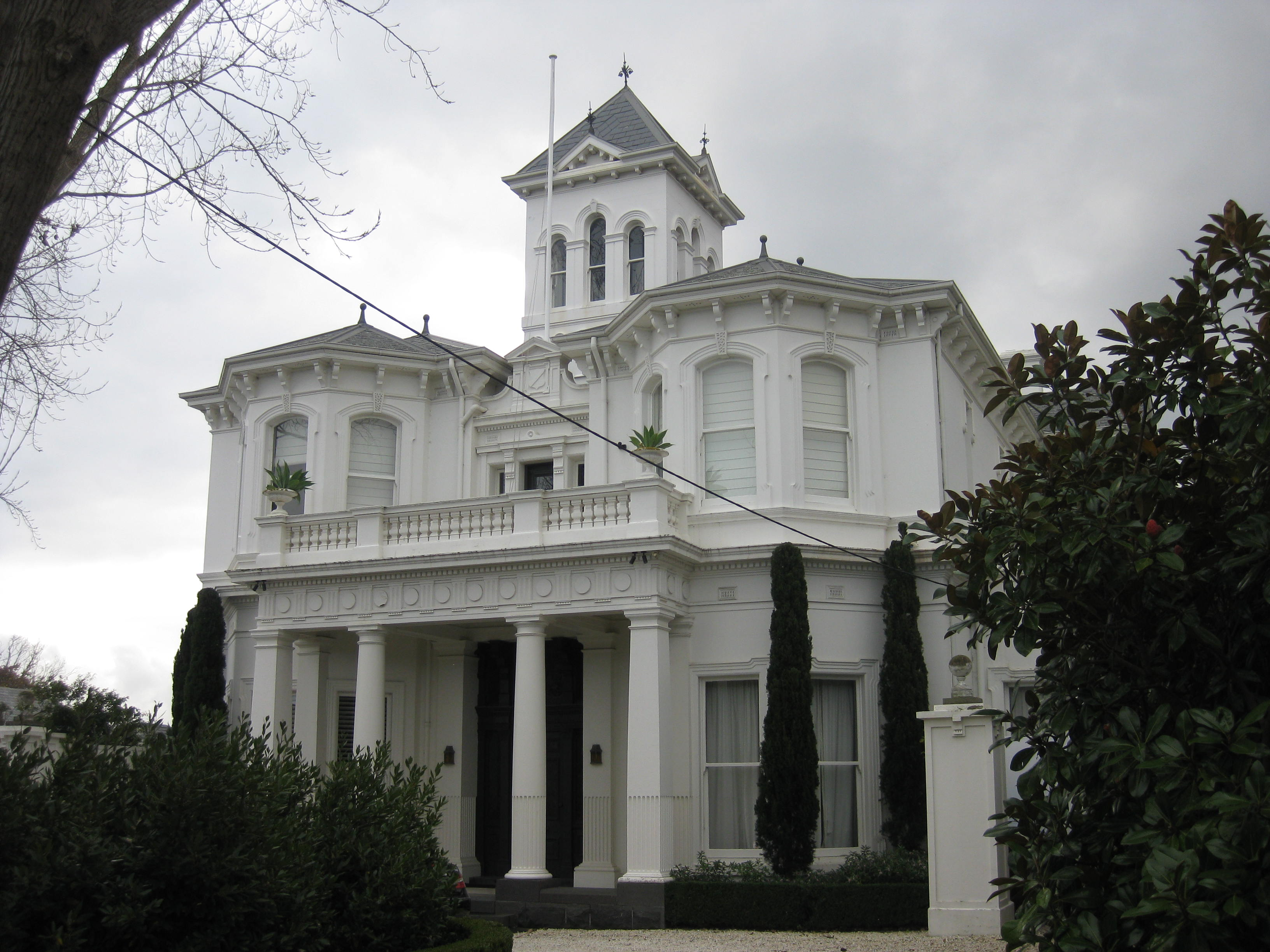
Chastleton House, Toorak (1886–1887)

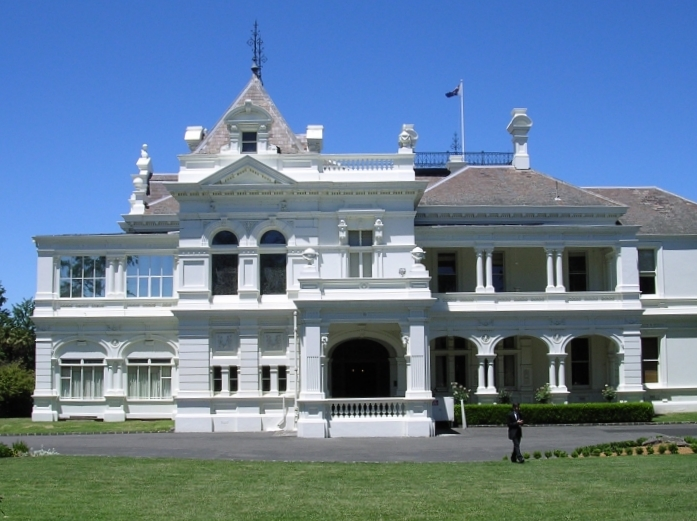
Stonington, Malvern (1890)

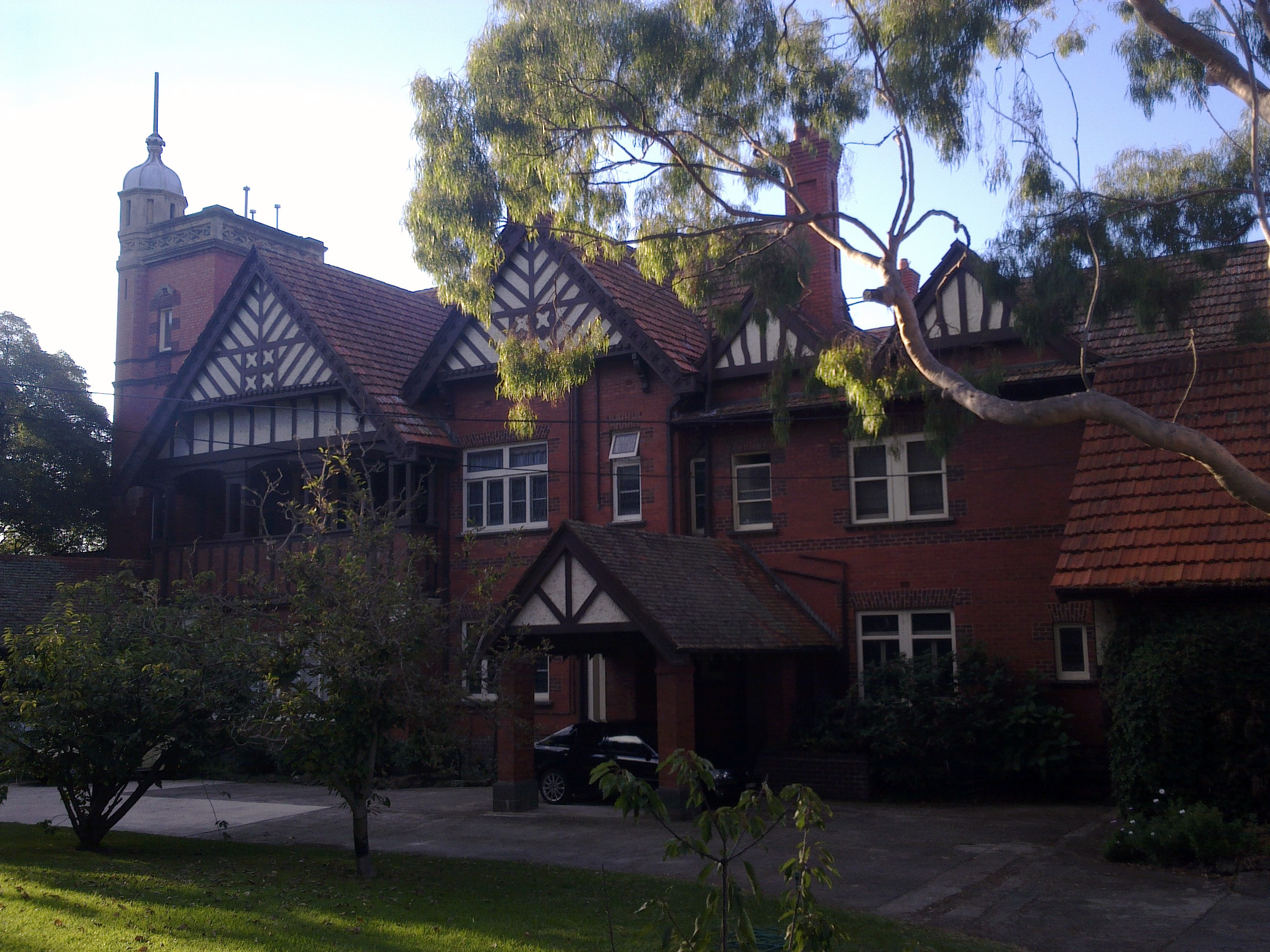
Edzell, Toorak (1892)

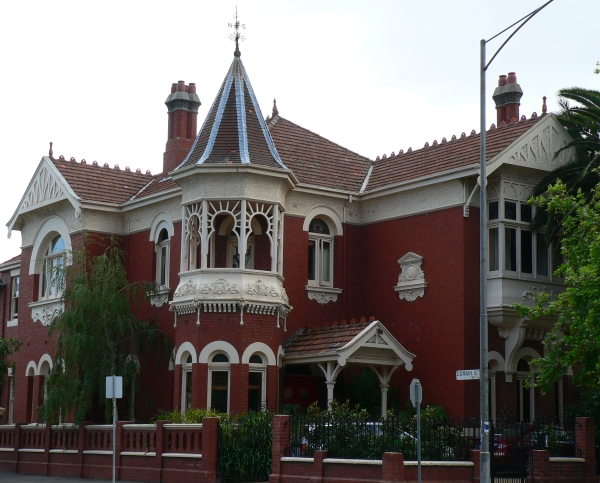
Tilba, South Yarra (1907)

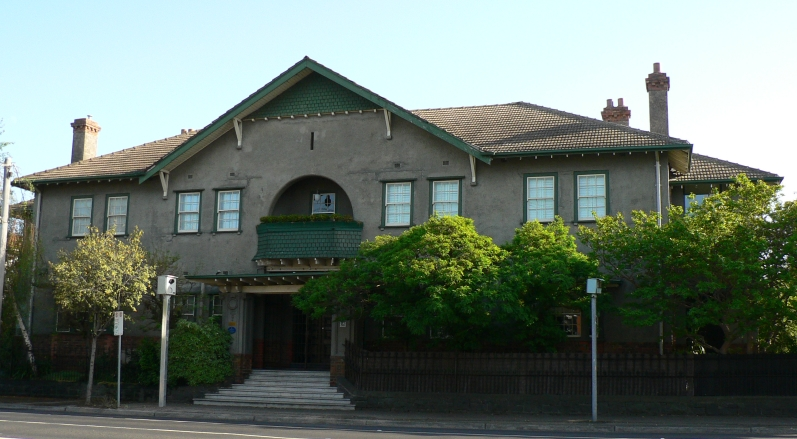
Belmont, Alma Road, St Kilda (1923)

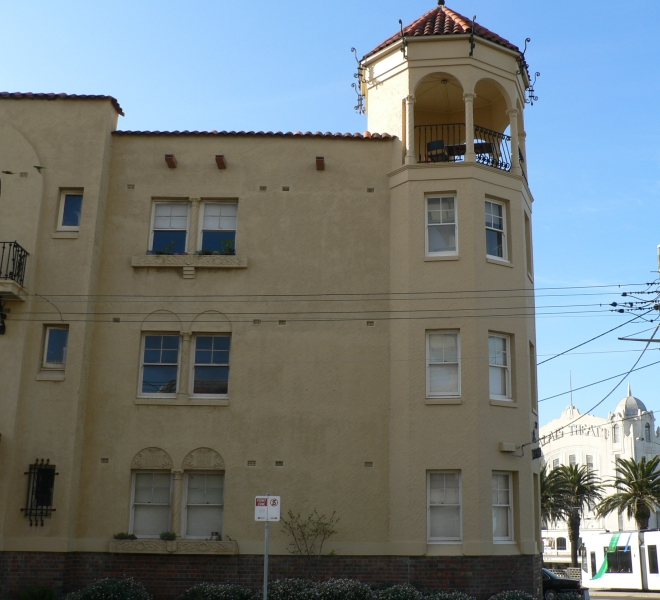
The Belvedere, St Kilda (1928) William H. Merritt

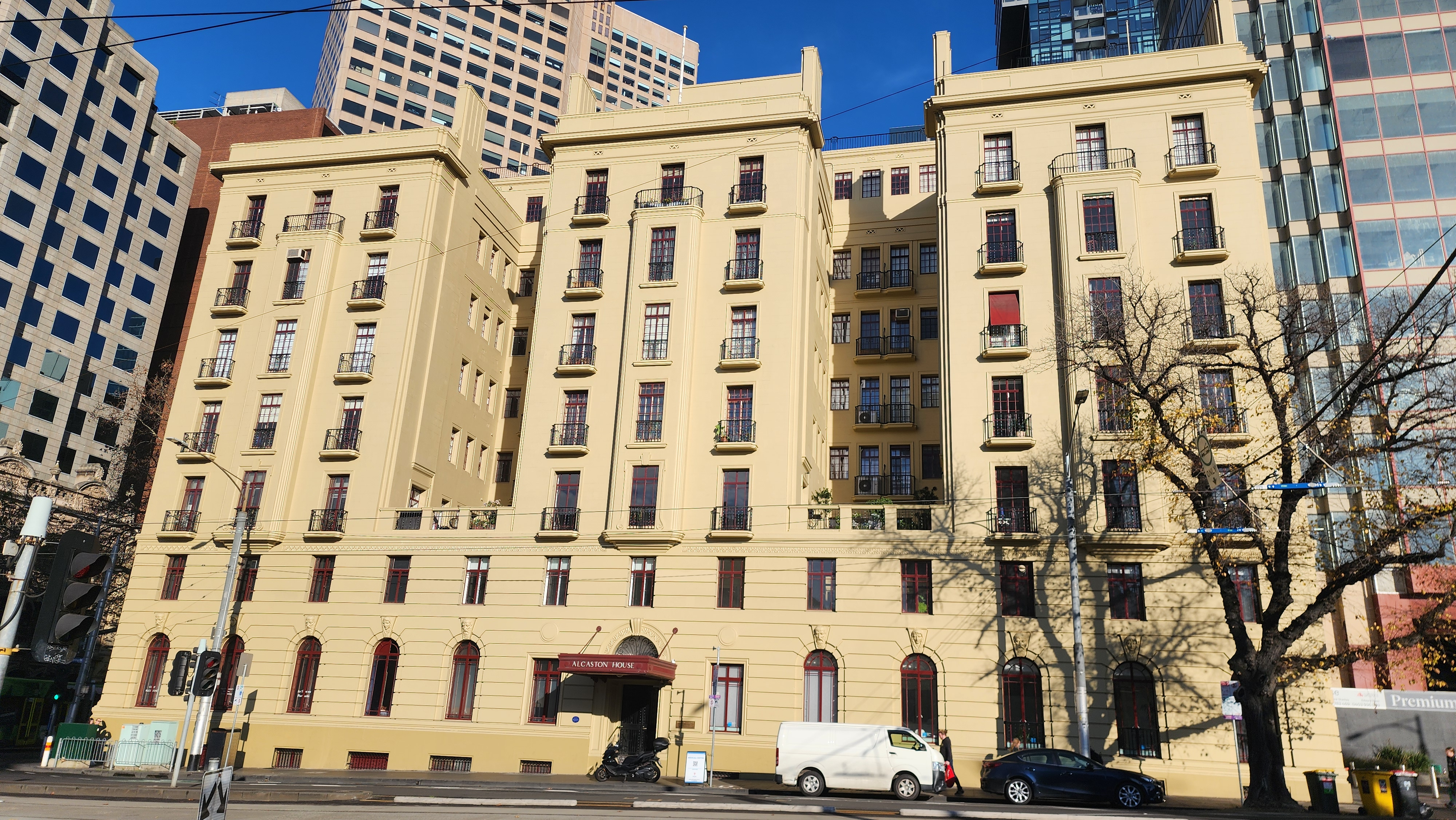
Alcaston House, Spring Street (1929–1930)

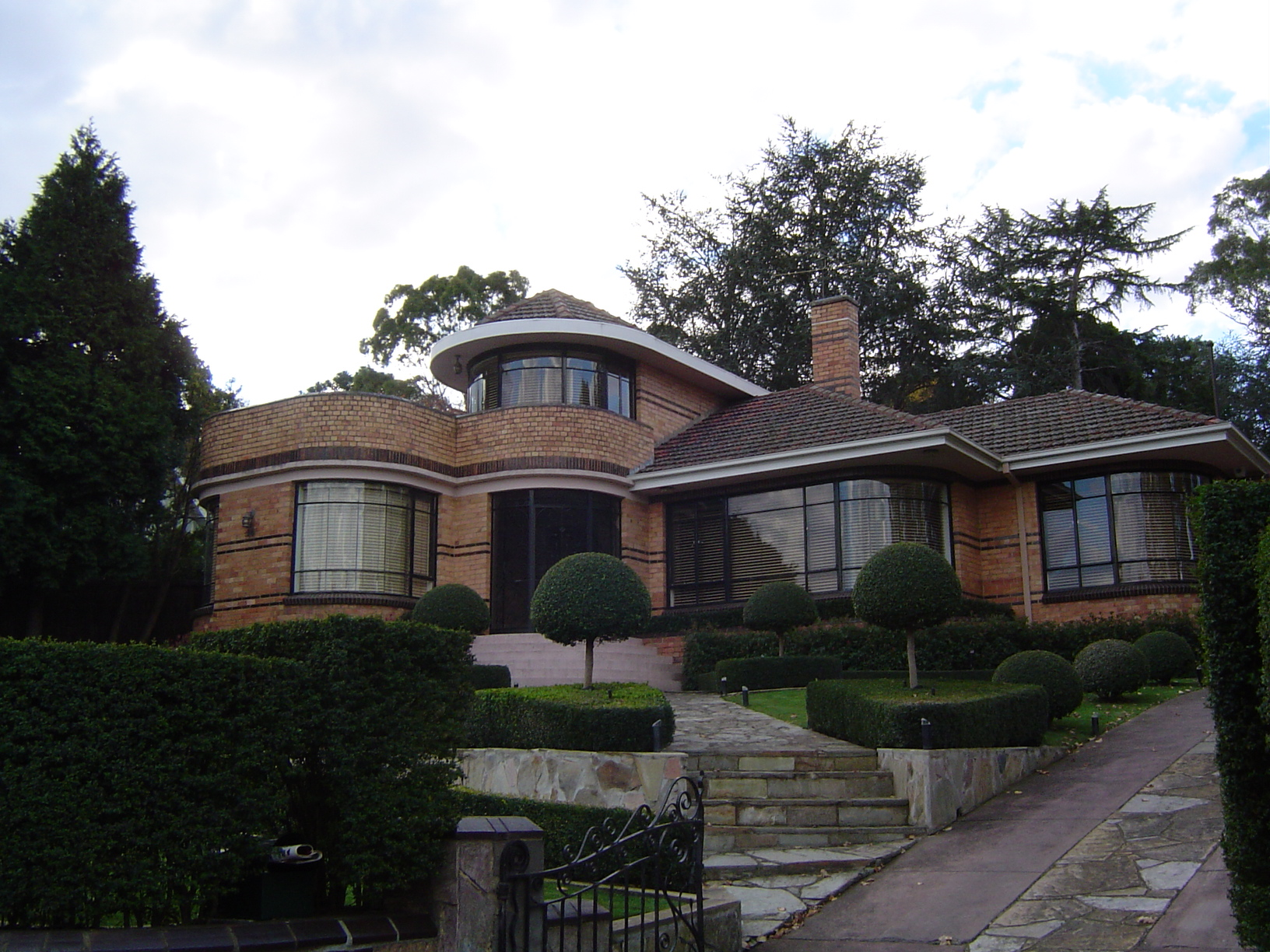
Suburban home at Maltravers Road, Eaglemont (1930)

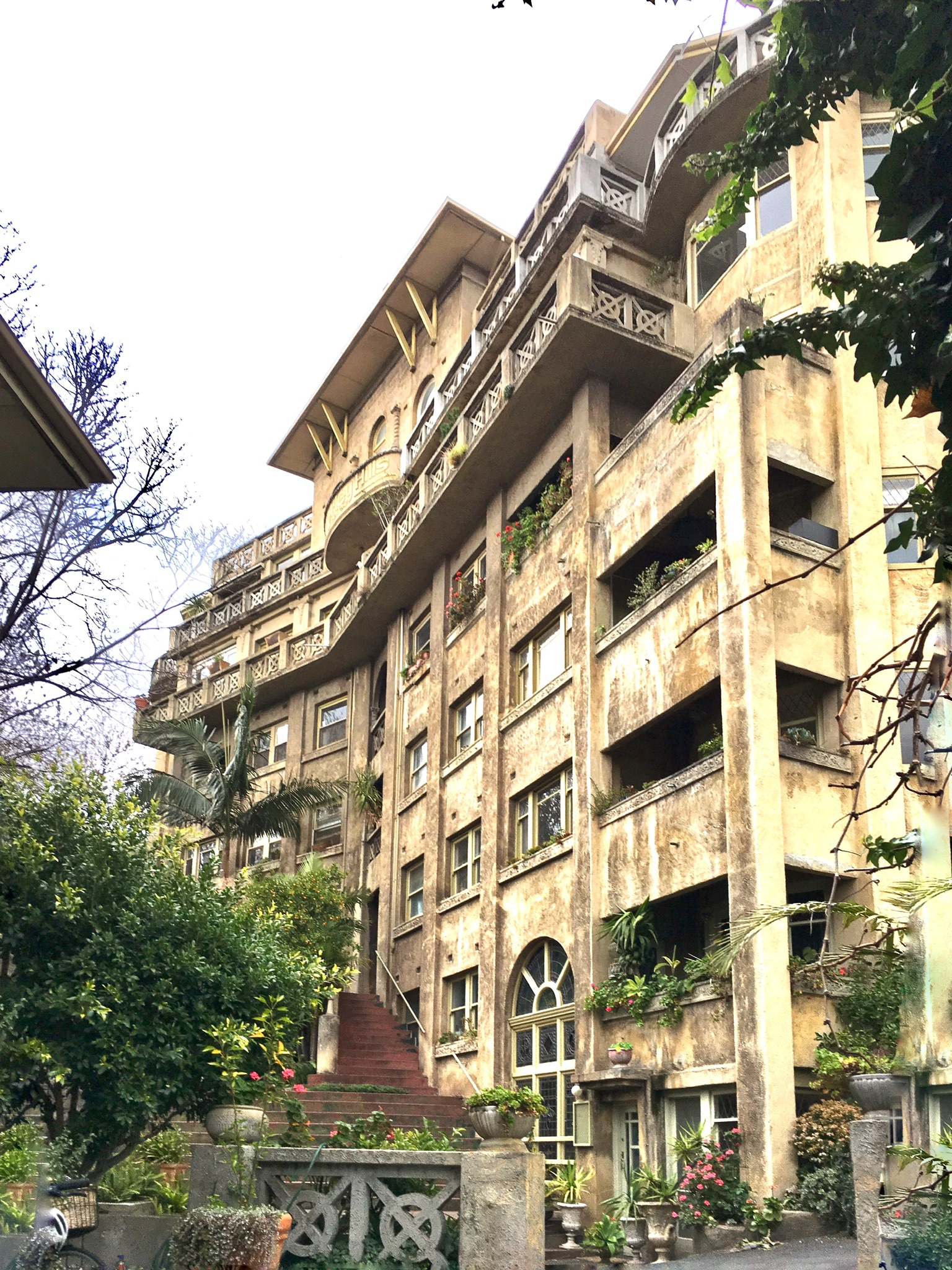
Beverley Hills Apartment Block, South Yarra (1930s) Howard Ratcliff Lawson

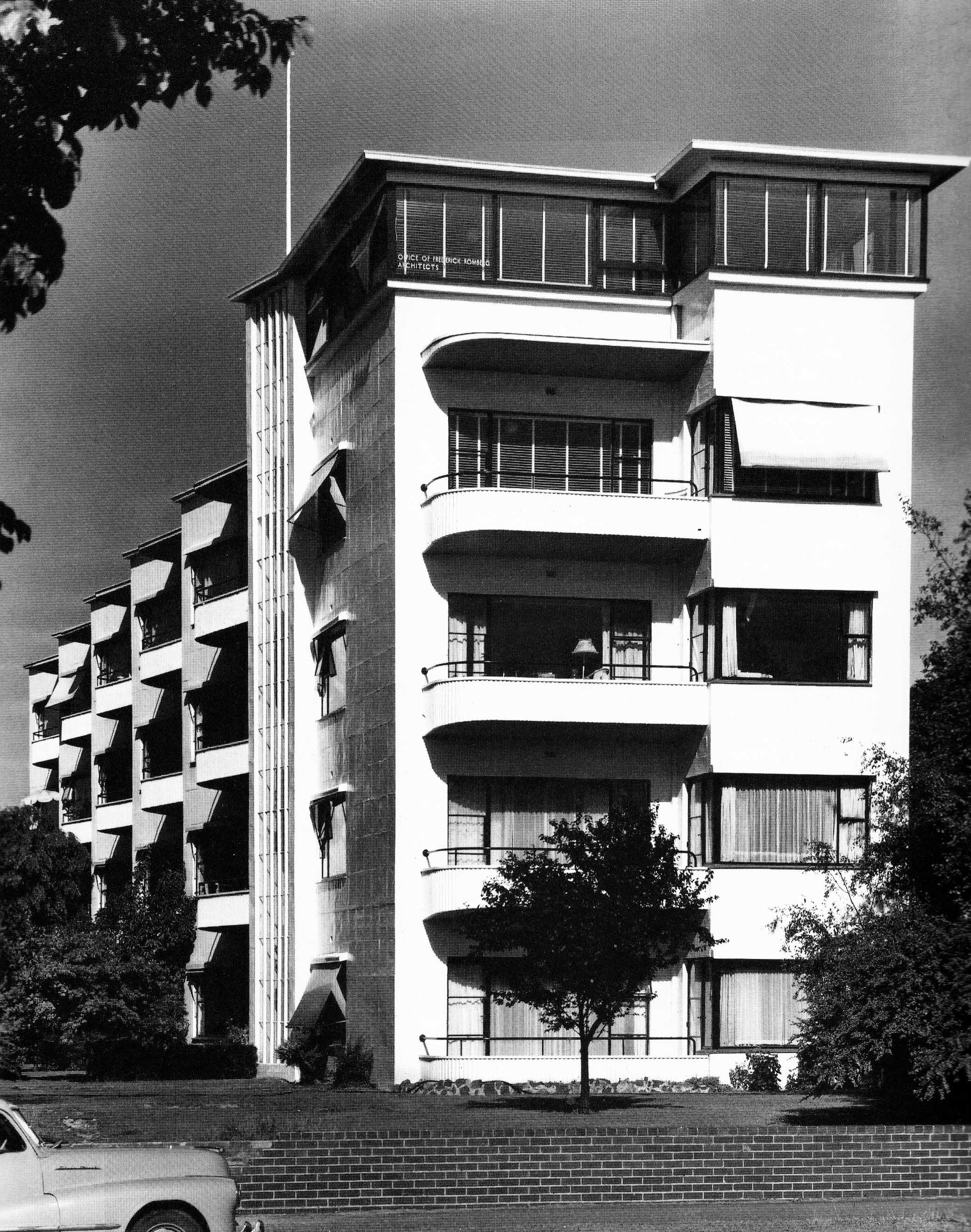
Newburn Flats (1939–1941) Frederick Romberg

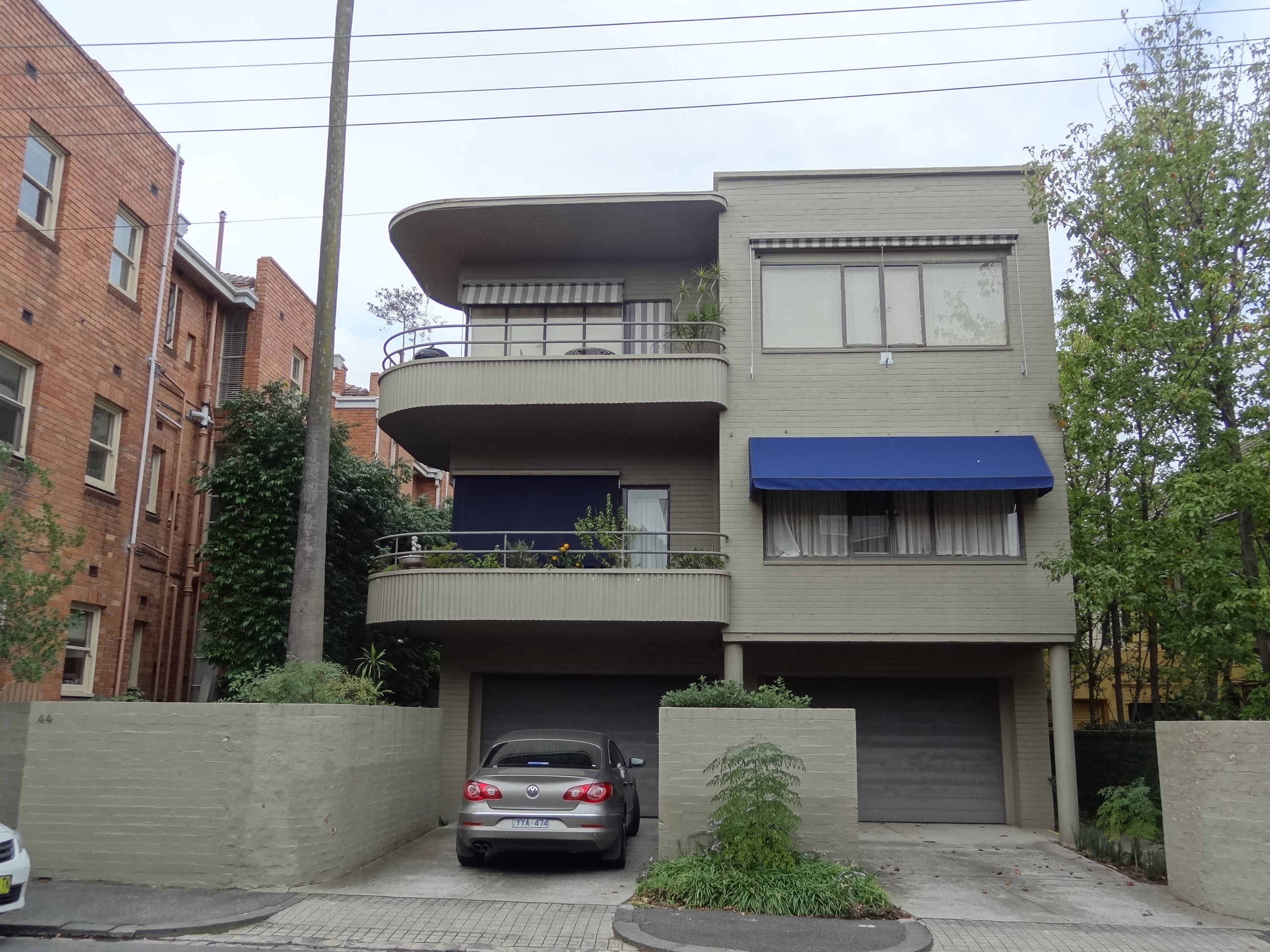
Yarrabee Flats (1940) Frederick Romberg

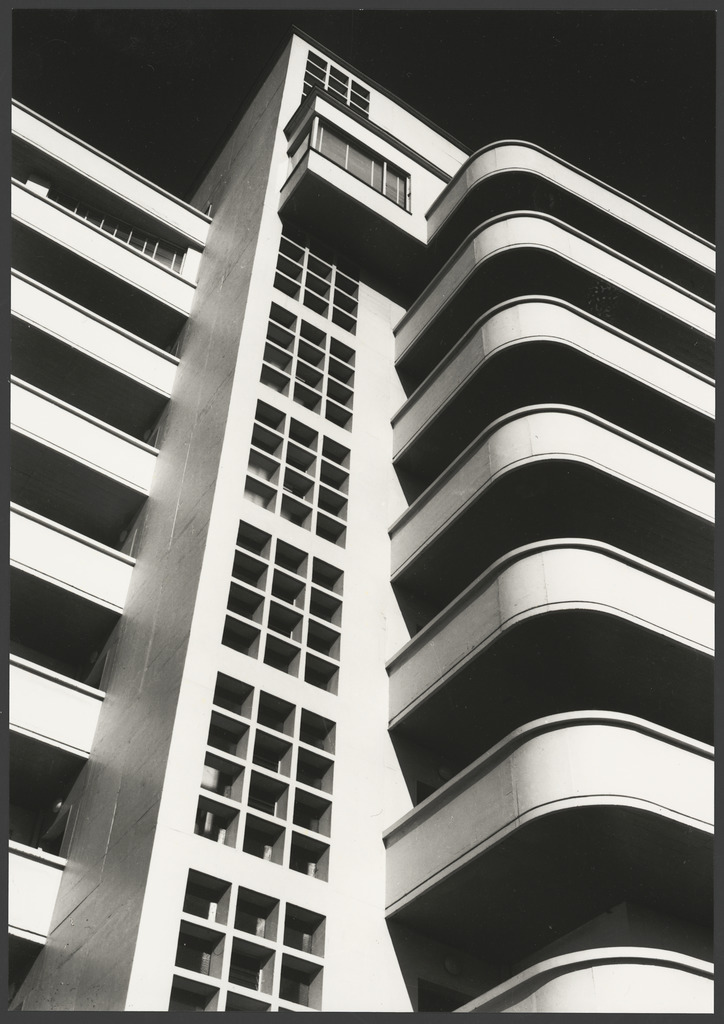
Stanhill (1947–1950) Frederick Romberg

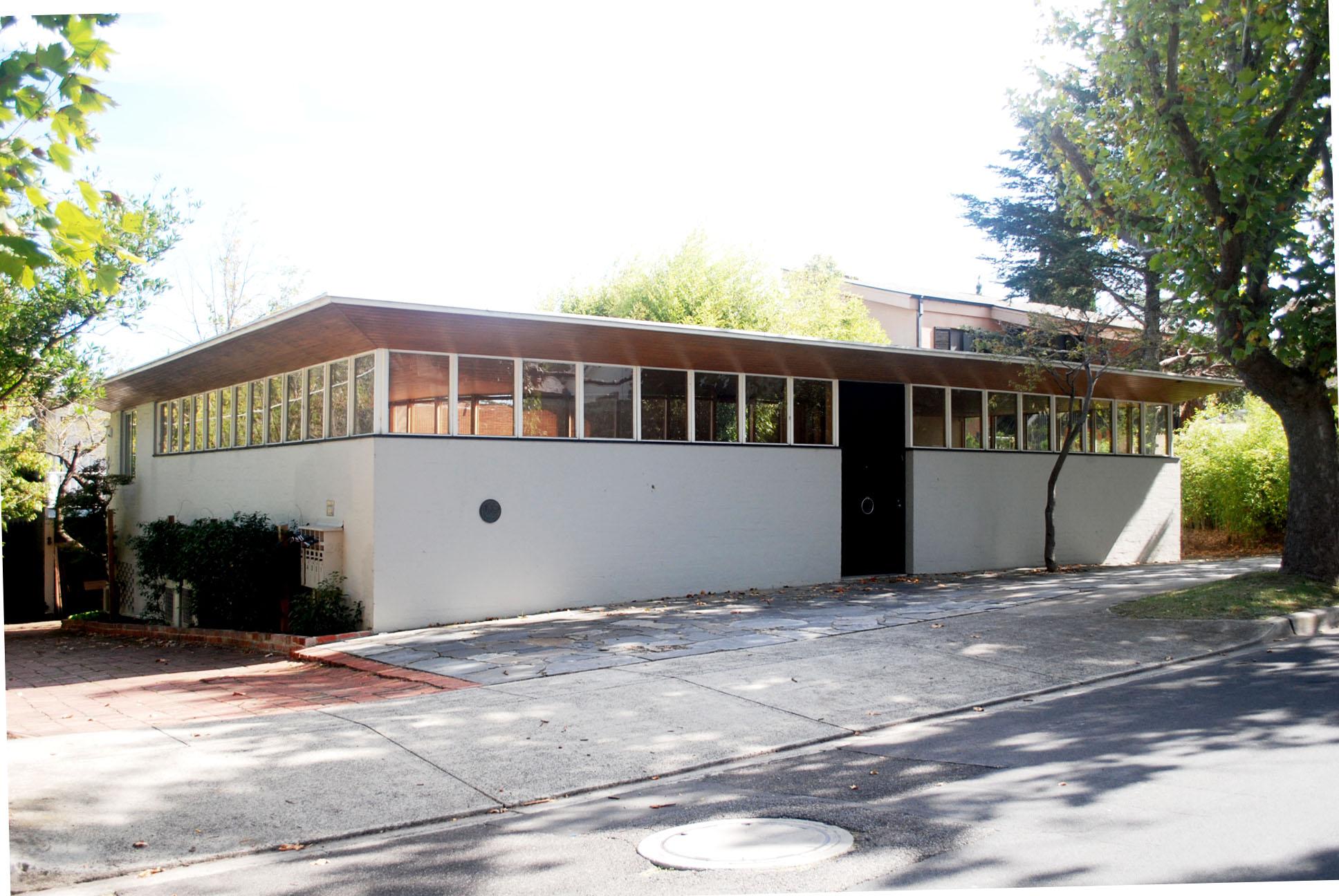
Roy Grounds House, Toorak (1952) Roy Grounds

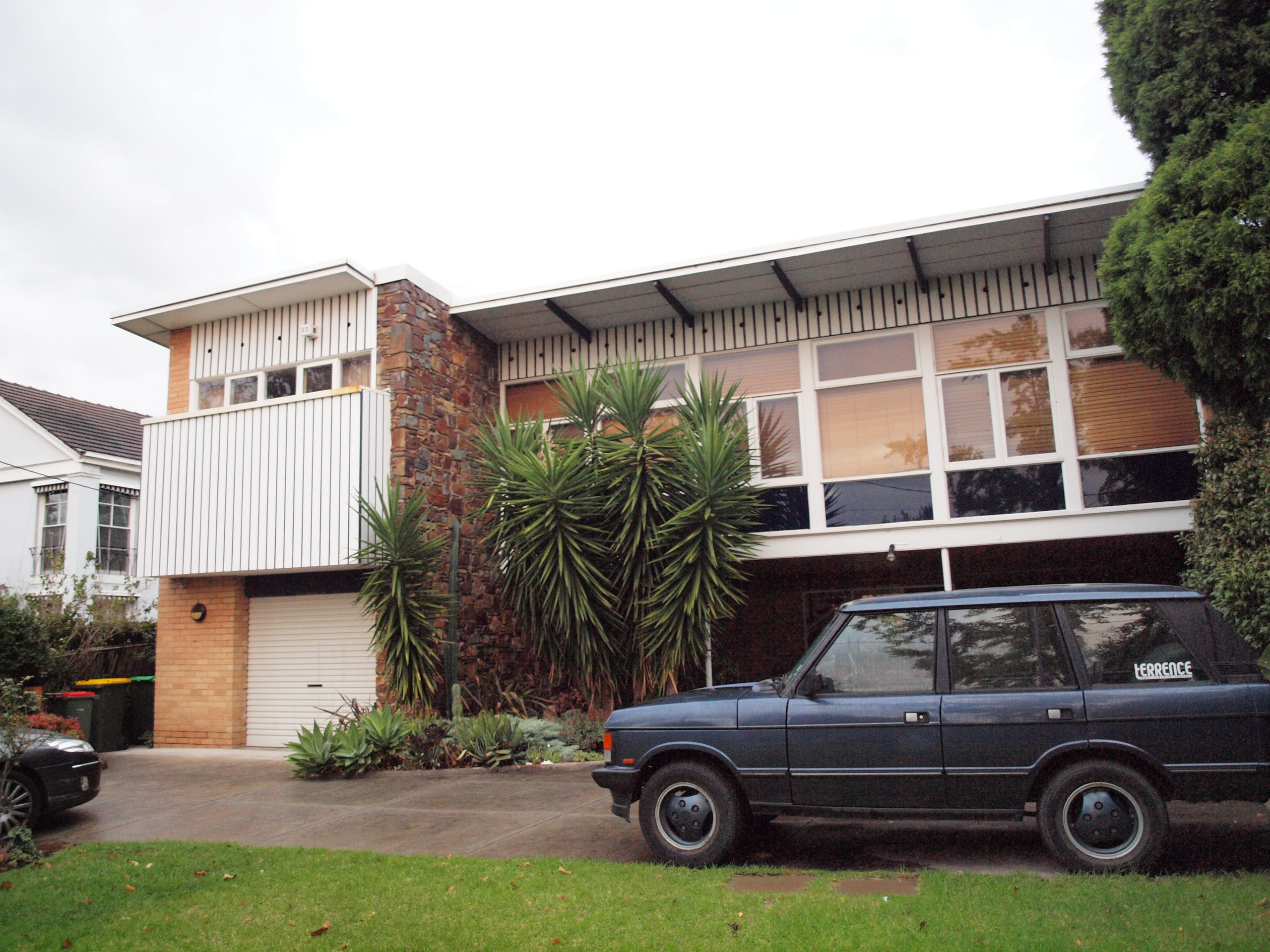
Lind House, Caulfield (1954–55) Anatol Kagan

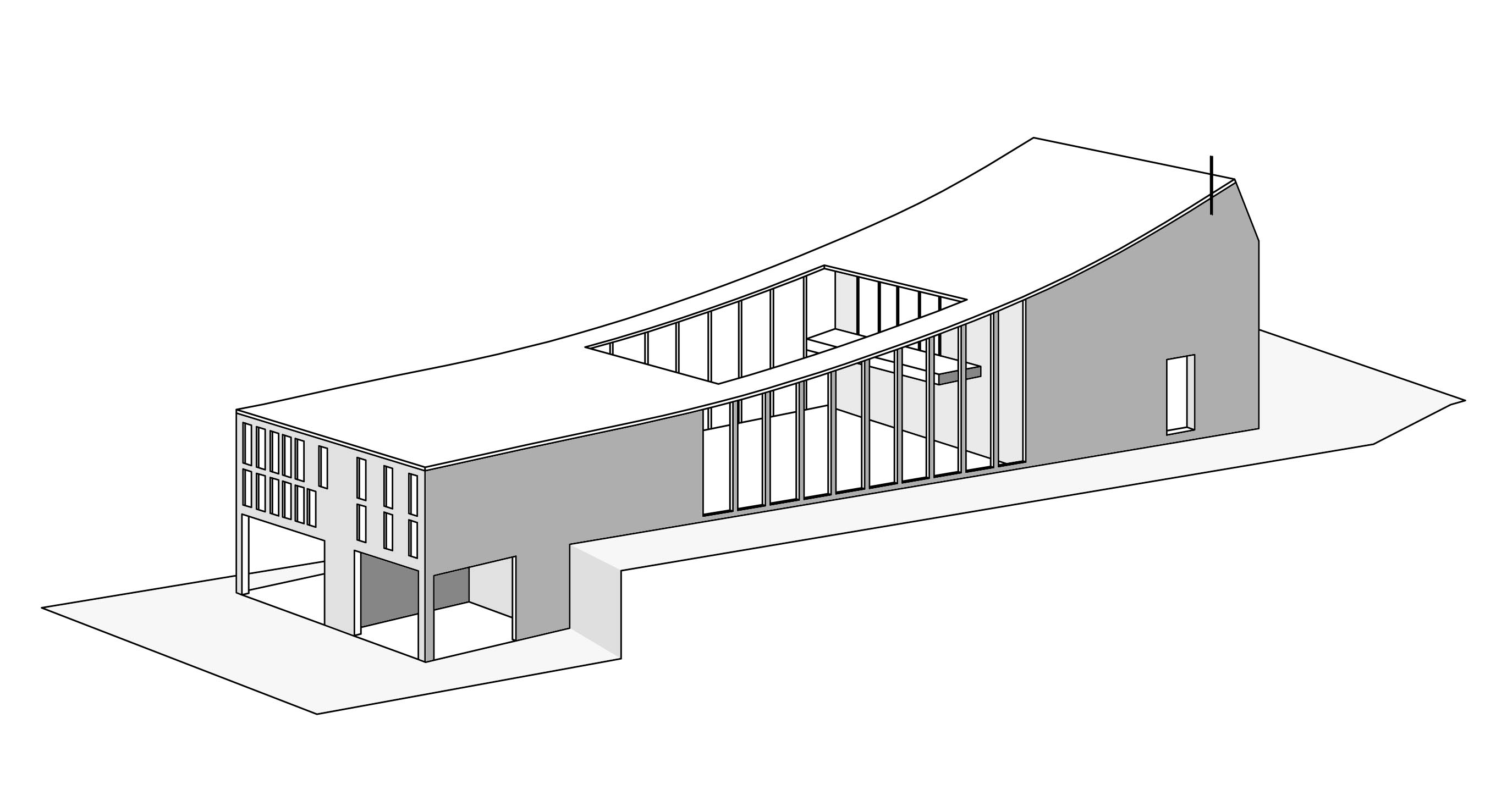
Walsh Street House (1958) Robin Boyd

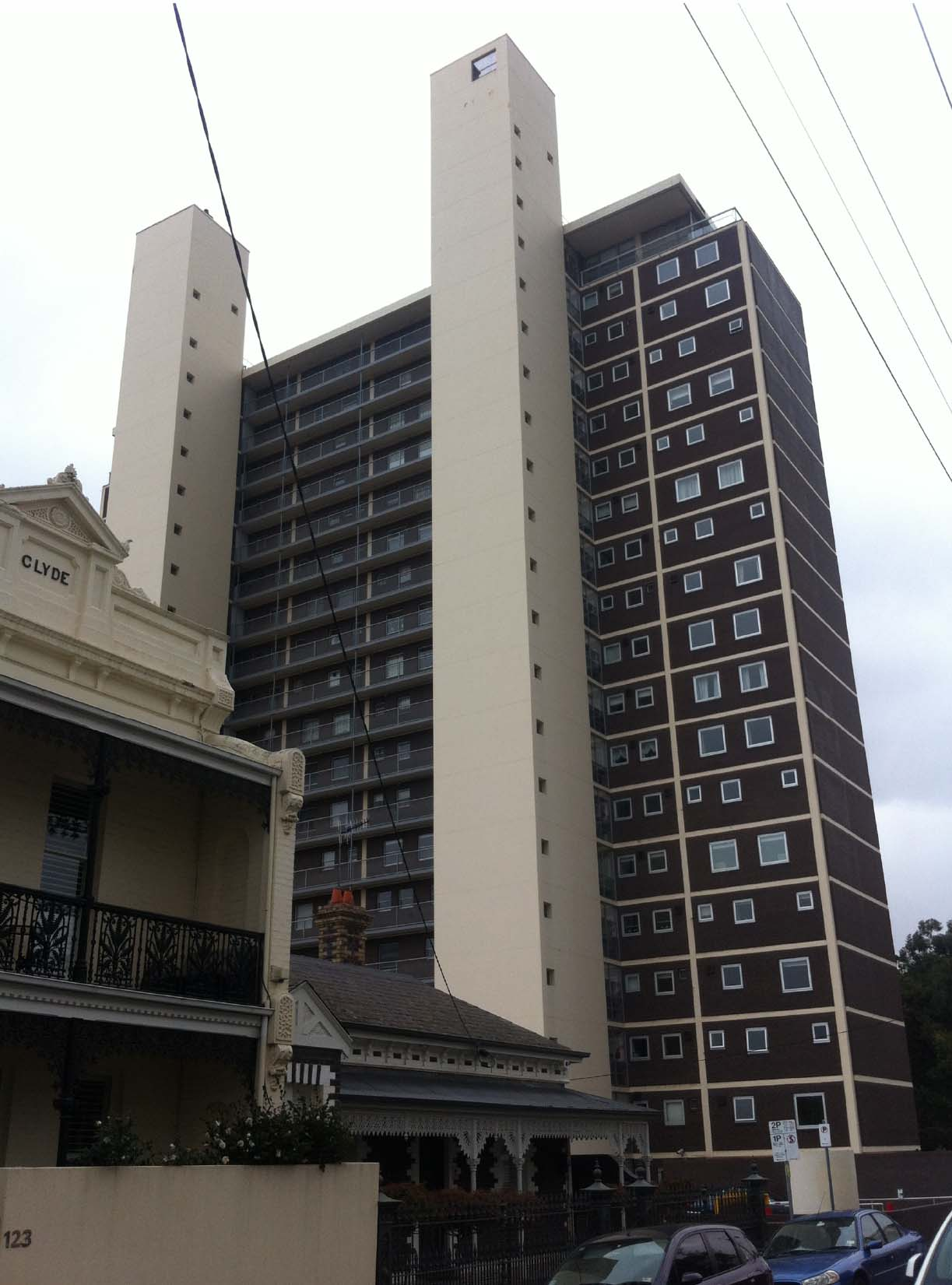
Domain Park Towers (1962) Robin Boyd

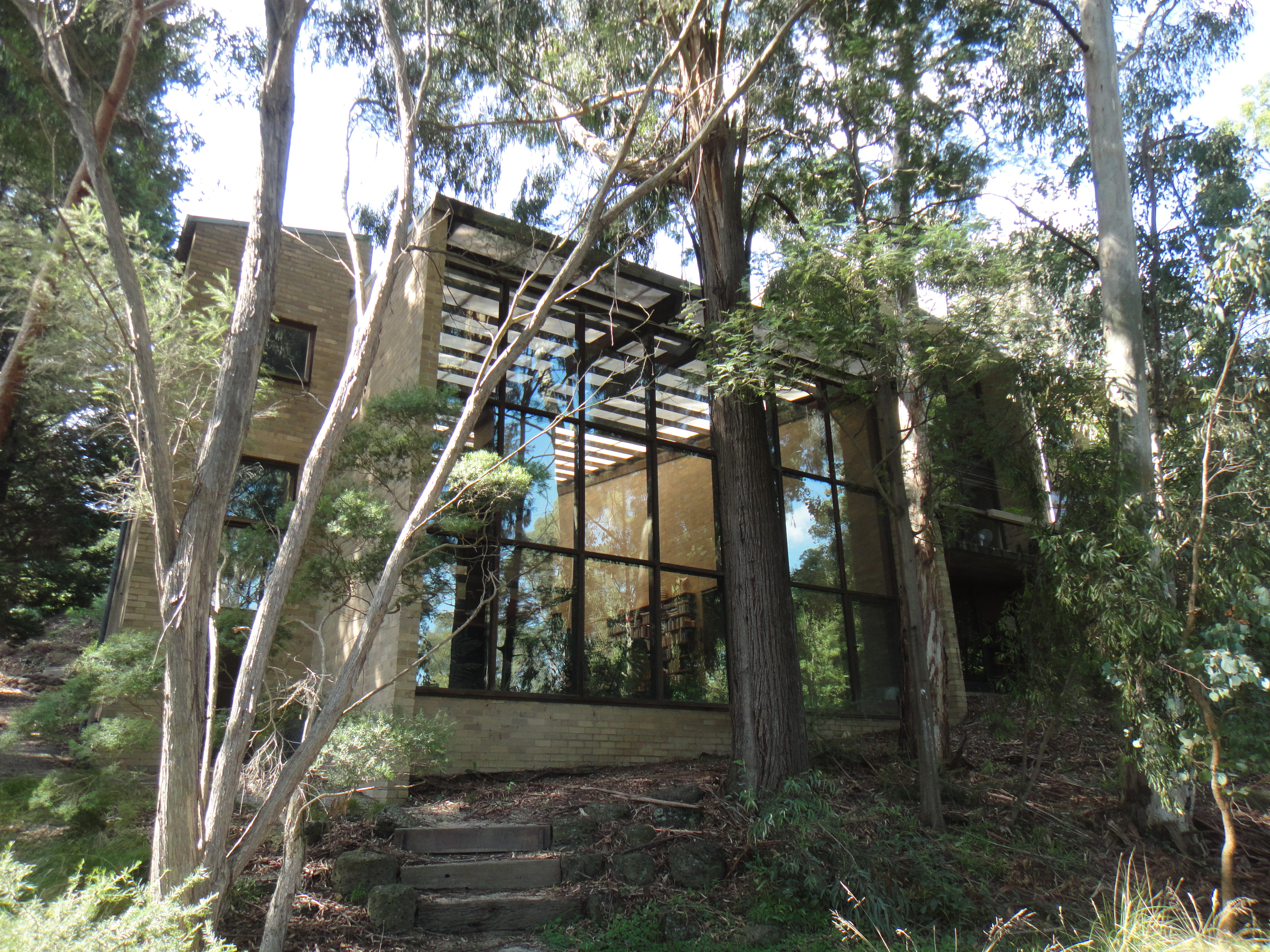
Featherston House (1967) Robin Boyd

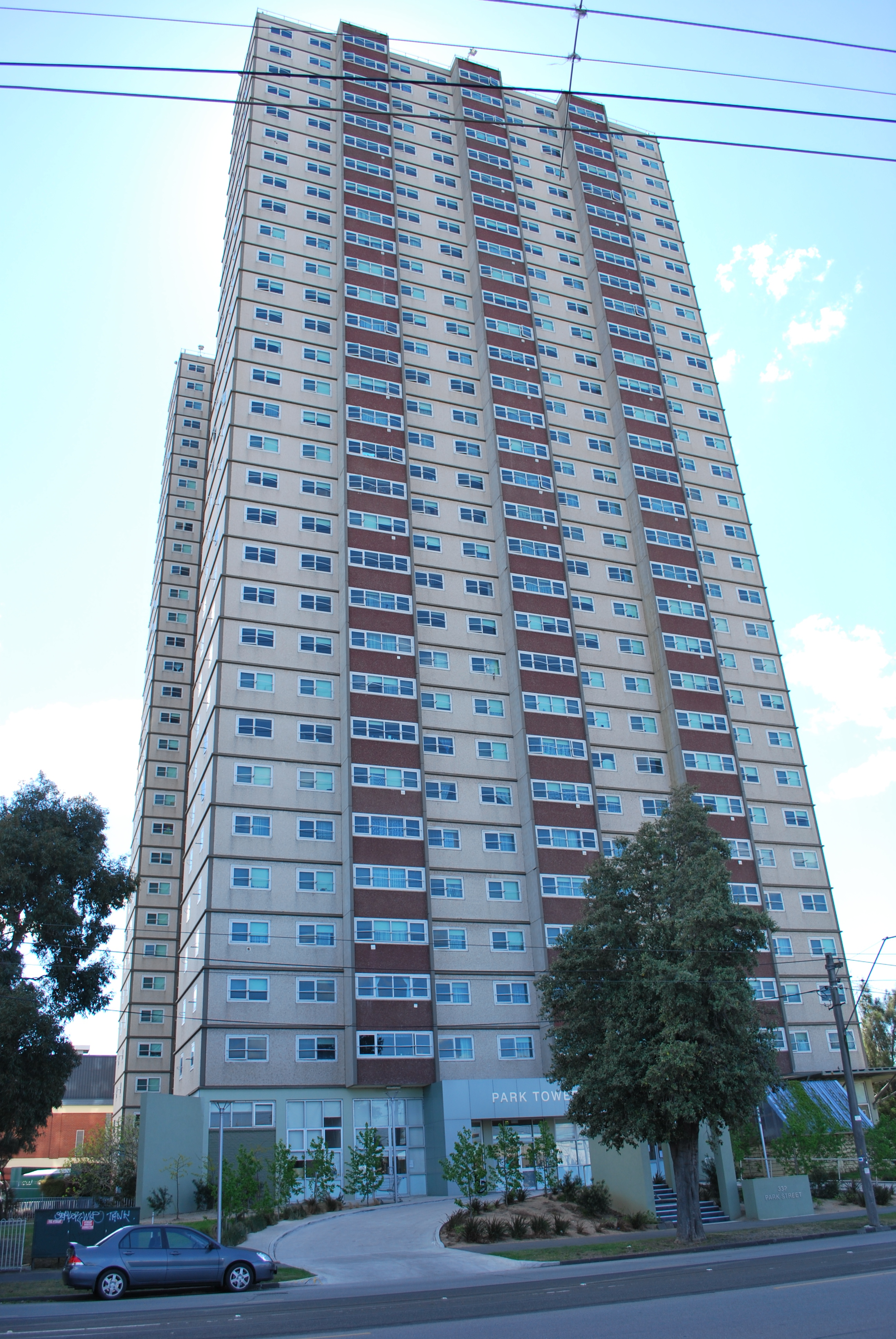
Park Towers, South Melbourne (1967–1968) Housing Commission of Victoria

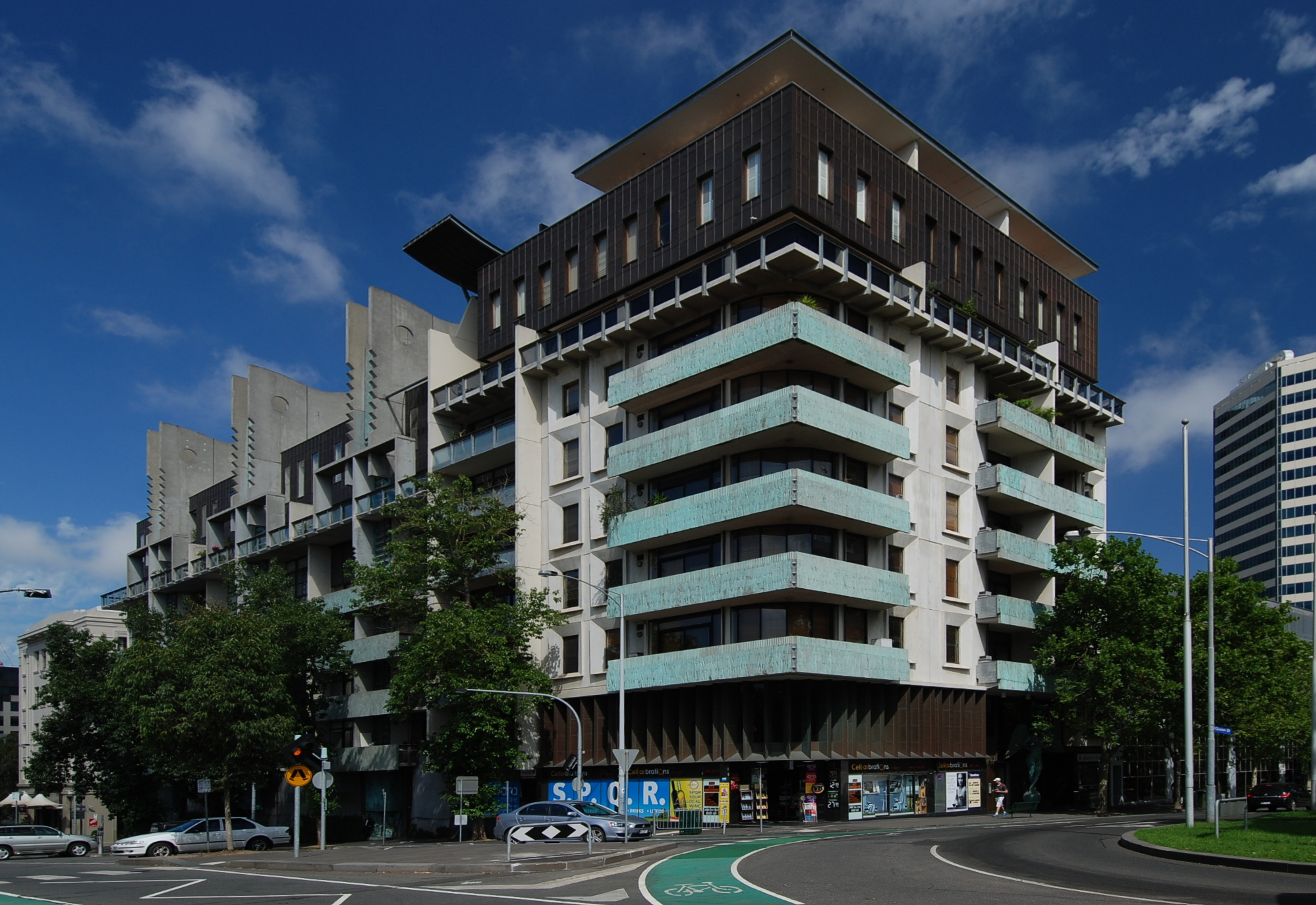
Melbourne Terrace Apartments Franklin Street (1994) Nonda Katsilidis

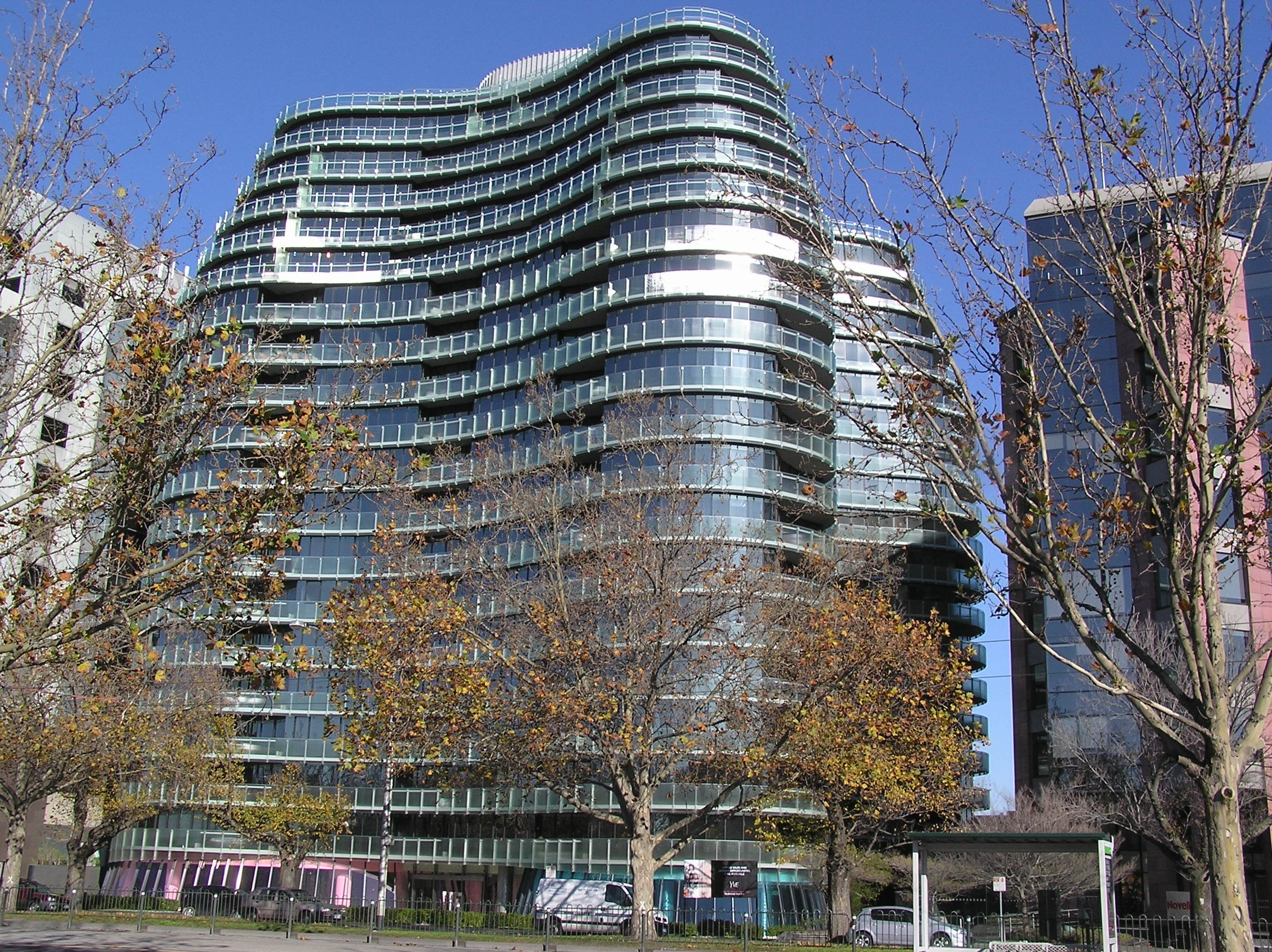
YVE, St Kilda Road (2004–2006) Wood Marsh

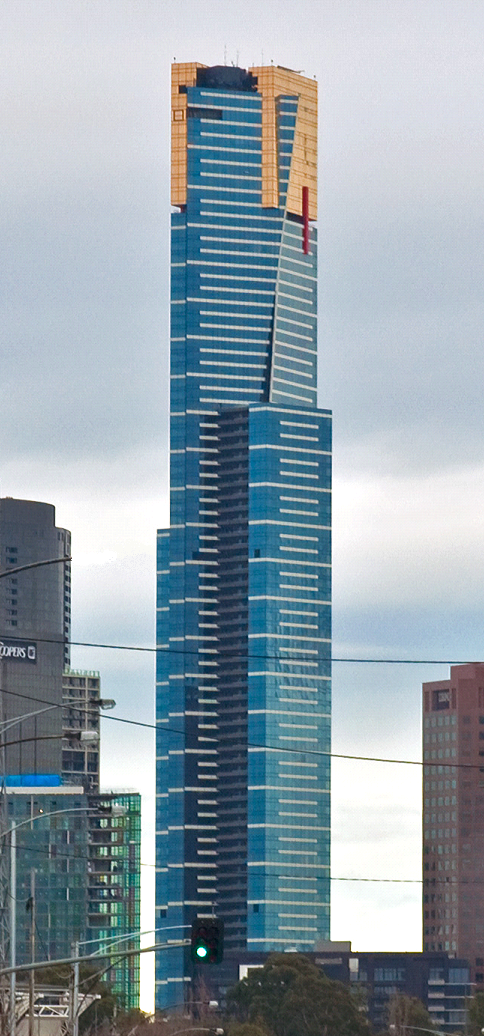
Eureka Tower (2006) Fender Katsalidis

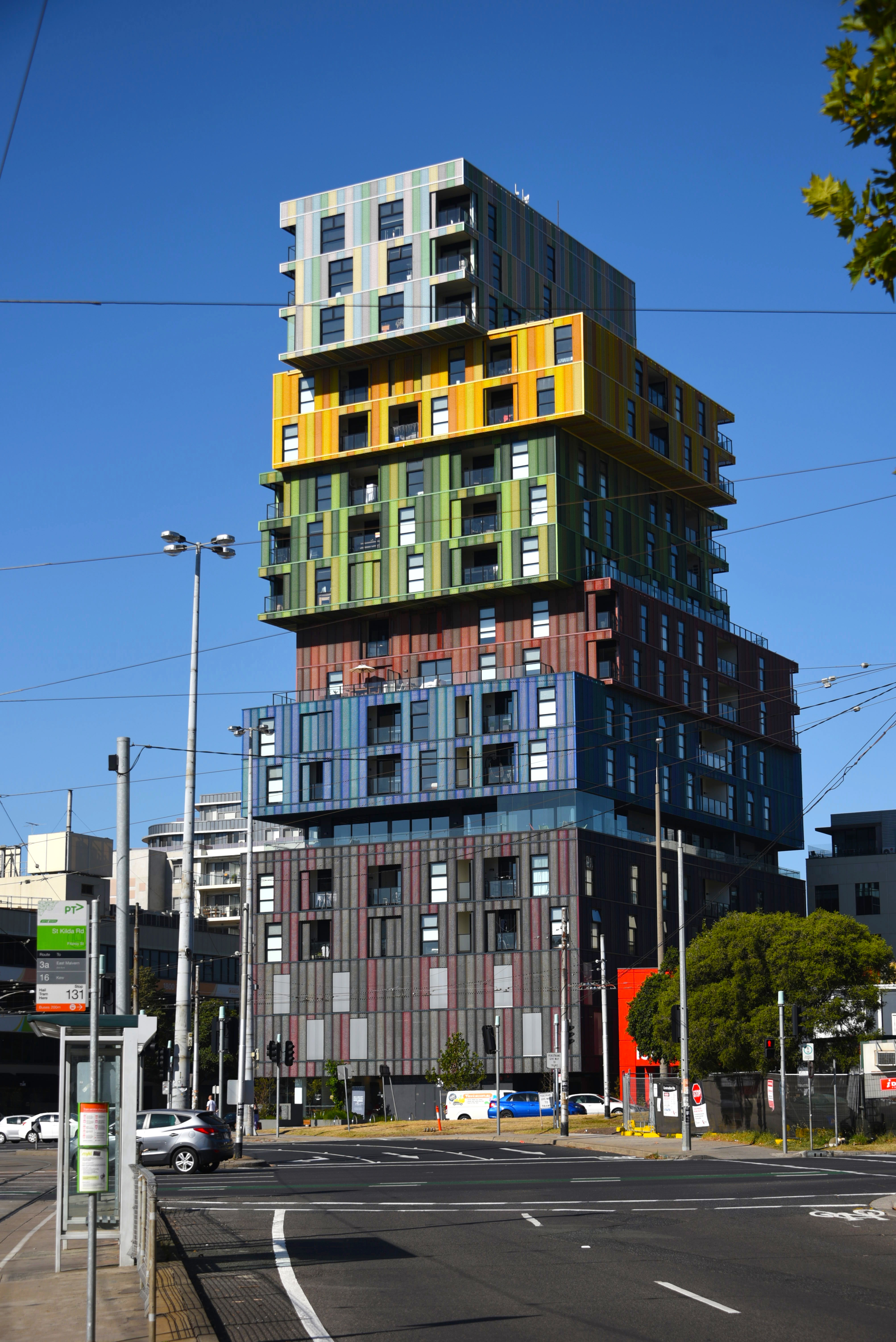
The Icon, St Kilda (2014) Jackson Clements Burrows

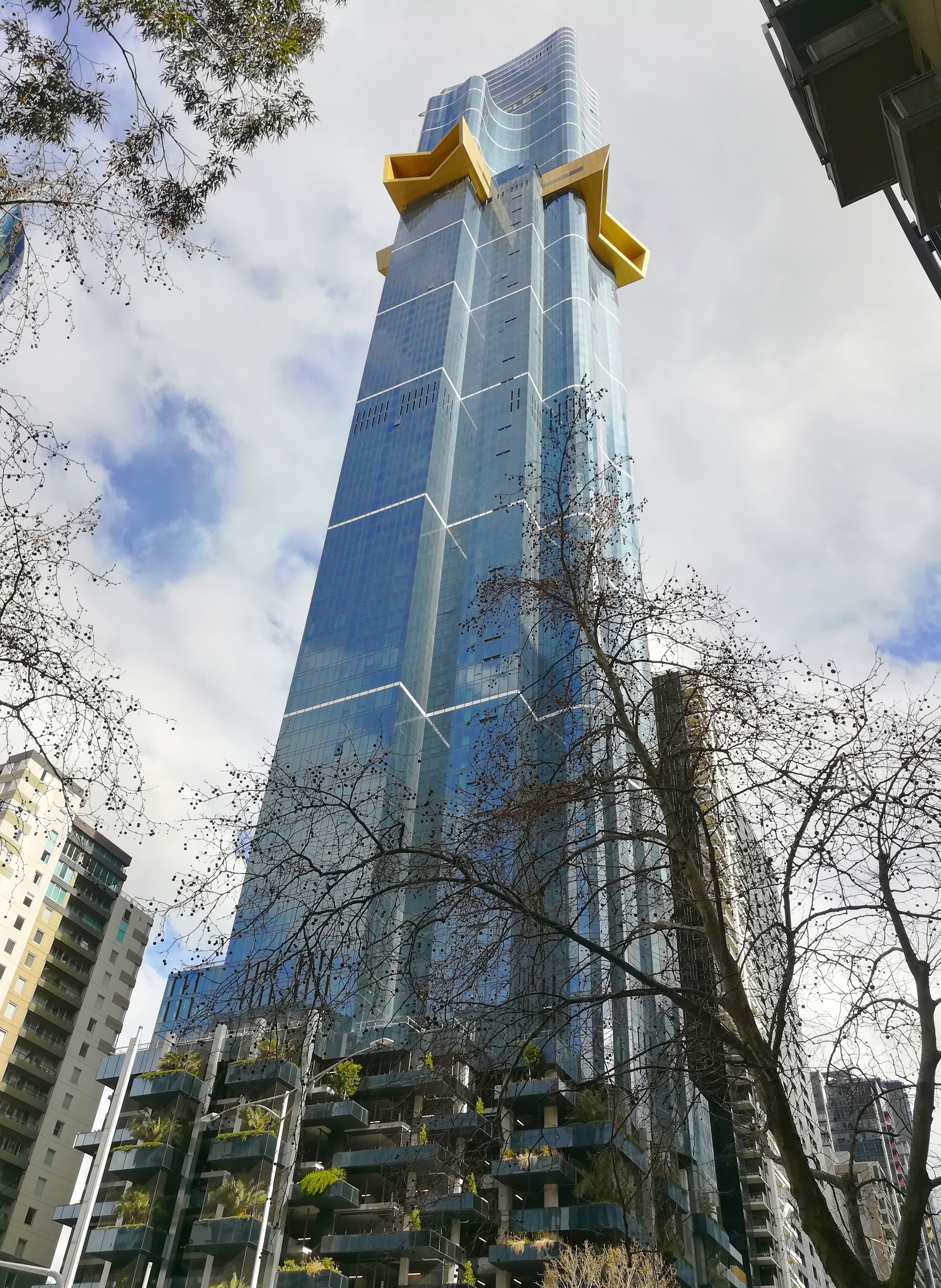
Australia 108, Southbank (2018–2020) Fender Katsalidis

== Preservation Issues ==
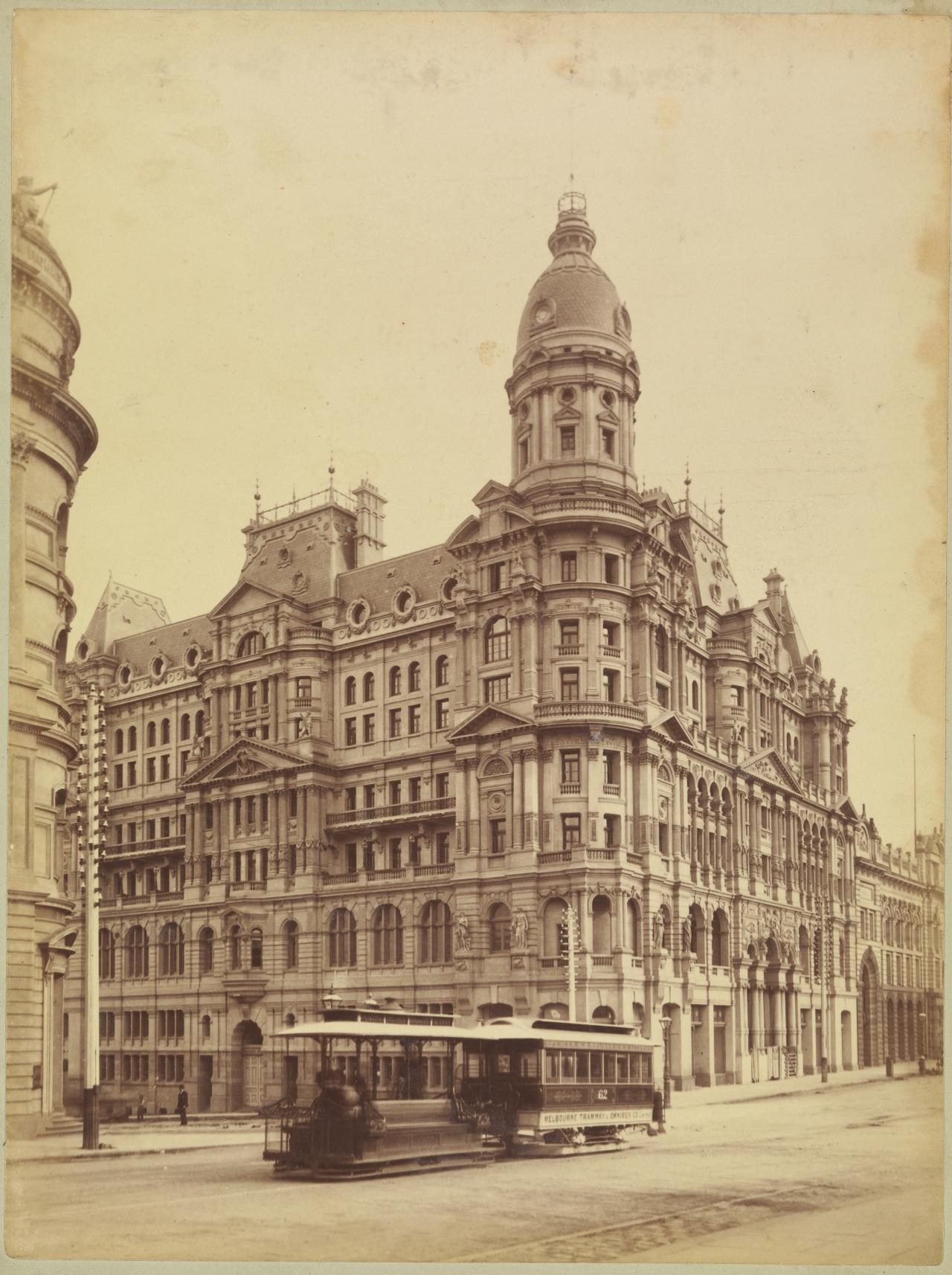
The Federal Coffee Palace in the 1890s. The grand hotel, built in the French Second Empire style, was demolished in 1974.

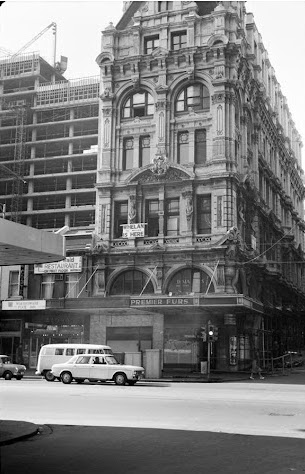
Town Hall Chambers on the corner of Little Collins and Swanston Street under demolition in 1968. Tivoli Court office tower is being erected in the background.

The tragedy of Melbourne's modernity culminated in the destruction of 10 landmark buildings, whose architectural heritage rivalled many mid-town Manhattan gems.

— James Grant Hay

Another venue that shaped Melbourne's early architectural form is the pub, a licensed drinking establishment traditionally built on corners within the inner-city and city centre, usually no more than two-storeys tall. In the 1920s, there were about 100 corner pubs in Melbourne but this figure diminished to 45 by the 1960s. Today there are approximately 12 operating in the Melbourne city centre – including The Metropolitan, which is located on the corner of William Street, and first served beer in 1854.

In 1972, as a result of sustained pressure from the National Trust, Victorian Parliament amended the Town and Country Planning Act to include the "conservation and enhancement of buildings, works, objects and sites specified as being of architectural, historical or scientific interest". The act went onto specify the prohibition of "pulling down", "removal" or "decoration or defacement" to any such building. Because only specified sites were to be protected, the local councils across Melbourne had the task of allocating buildings and places that warranted protection. The City of Melbourne council specified the entire city centre as an area of significance in 1973. However, this blanket protection measure came unstuck in 1975 when the council was threatened with compensation payments to developers if their plans were rejected on heritage grounds, and the issue of compensation was not settled until 1982. At the same time, the Historic Buildings Preservation Act was passed in 1974, protecting at first only 100 places across the state. This was soon expanded to include many of the central city's finest buildings, though only a handful of the commercial landmarks, and listing did not necessarily ensure preservation. In this context, as well as the many places demolished in the 1960s sometimes without a plan for a replacement, "developers white elephant schemes for central Melbourne proceeded virtually unchecked throughout the 70s", resulting in widespread loss of historic buildings. Heritage listing by the City of Melbourne did not properly occur until 1982, with the listing of about 300 Notable buildings, and large areas declared Heritage Precincts, with the added protection of the re-imposition of the height limit in the central retail area between Russell and Elizabeth Streets, and much lower limits in places such Chinatown, Bourke Hill, and Hardware Lane, which was also pedestrianised.

Controversy arose in 2016 after the historic Corkman Irish Pub in Carlton was illegally demolished overnight by developer Raman Shaqiri, resulting in the State Planning Minister pursuing an order (via the Victorian Civil and Administrative Tribunal) for the two-storey pub to be rebuilt. The site owners were fined AUD$1.325 million after pleading guilty to the process. The site of the pub, which was built in 1858 and was once called the Carlton Inn Hotel, is currently a temporary carpark.

== See also ==
- Architecture of Australia
- List of heritage listed buildings in Melbourne
- List of demolished buildings and structures in Melbourne
- List of tallest buildings in Melbourne
- Victorian architecture
