= Supreme Court of Victoria (building) =

Supreme Court of Victoria building
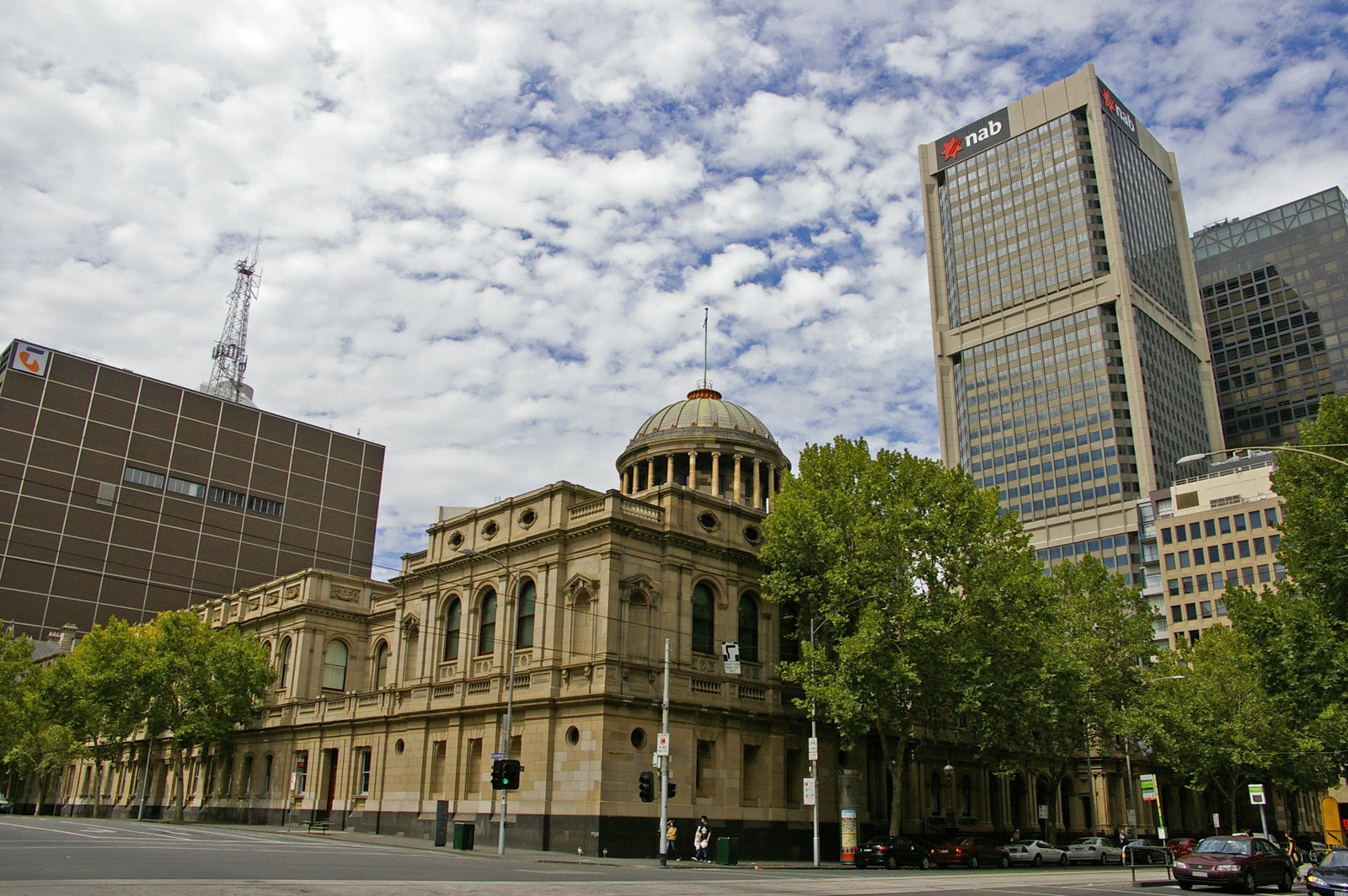
- The Supreme Court building as seen from the corner of William St and Lonsdale St

- Location within Melbourne
- Interactive map of the Supreme Court of Victoria building area

General information
- Status: Completed
- Type: Court house
- Architectural style: Classical Renaissance Revival
- Location: Melbourne, Victoria, Australia, 210 William Street
- Coordinates: 37°48′51″S 144°57′29″E
- Current tenants: Supreme Court of Victoria
- Construction started: 1874
- Completed: 1884; 142 years ago
- Owner: Victorian Government

Design and construction
- Architects: Smith & Johnson; John James Clark; Peter Kerr

Other information
- Public transit: –; –; – 216, 302, 304, 305, 318, 905, 906, 907, 908

Victorian Heritage Register
- Official name: Library of the Supreme Court
- Type: State Registered Place
- Designated: 20 August 1982
- Part of: Law Courts
- Reference no.: H1477
- Heritage overlay no.: HO757
- Category: Law Enforcement

Register of the National Estate
- Official name: Library of the Supreme Court
- Type: Defunct Register
- Designated: undated
- Reference no.: 5183

The Supreme Court of Victoria building, is a court building located at 192-228 William Street in Melbourne, Victoria, Australia. It is part of a complex of buildings which, together with the Supreme Court Library and Court of Appeal, are known as the Melbourne Law Courts. It is currently the home to the Supreme Court of Victoria, the most superior court in the state of Victoria, and inferior only to the High Court of Australia. The Supreme Court has occupied the site since its first sitting in February 1884.

The building was added to the Victorian Heritage Register on 20 August 1982 as part of a listing on the same date of a wider Law Courts precinct; and, on an unknown date, to the now defunct Register of the National Estate.

== History ==
The Supreme Court Building was constructed between 1874 and 1884.

The design for this major public work was decided by a design competition, with the Public Works Department to preside over the judging. Architects Alfred Louis Smith with Arthur Ebden Johnson won the competition for their design, subsequently creating a major scandal when it came to light that Johnson, who was a member of the judging panel, was a part of the winning submission. Johnson subsequently resigned from the Public Works Department and joined Smith to form a successful and highly influential firm of Smith & Johnson. J. J. Clark and Peter Kerr working within Public Works Department undertook the detail drawings and supervised the works, and the end result is somewhat different from the original design.

At the time of its construction it was the largest single building project being undertaken in the state and was the last major public building project to be undertaken before the depression of the 1890s halted almost all construction projects until the beginning of the 20th century. It remains to this day the largest single-design court building in Australia.

== Architecture ==
The Supreme Court Building is a grand example of the Classical Renaissance Revival style.

The building is constructed with two storeys of brick faced with Tasmanian freestone, founded on Malmsbury bluestone footings. The William Street front features an inset porch on both levels, fronted by elaborate arcade with Ionic style pilasters and columns at the ground level, and Composite above. A variety of treatments are applied to the window openings and aedicules, variously being round arched, broken pediments, or flat arched, and the three main facades feature plentiful use of blind arches and Tuscan pilasters.

The building itself is a perfect square with each street facade measuring 85 metres. A carriageway runs behind the building from Lonsdale Street, with a covered entry through to the courtyard, providing a secure entrance for prisoners. Inside the central courtyard, the Supreme Court Library is an almost freestanding structure, set closer to the William Street side, connected only by a corridor, with a circular domed double height chamber inside. The largest courtrooms occupy three corners, with a pair in the southwest corner, and pairs of courts occupying the lateral north and south wings. Other areas are occupied by administrative offices and judges' chambers. The interior of the building features elaborate moulded plasterwork on the walls and ceilings, as well as robust detailing of the benches, judges' canopies, and cedar paneling.

The design of the dome is clearly based on the design of James Gandon's Four Courts building in Dublin, Ireland, reputedly following a suggestion to Smith & Johnson by Chief Justice Sir William Stawell.

Extra courtrooms were built in 1952 in the eastern corners of the courtyard. At some point the elaborate stonework over the William Street entrance topped by a stone statue of a seated Lady Justice was replaced by a bronze version about twice life size. It is an unusual representation of Justice as the figure is not blindfolded and the scales of justice are not held aloft, but rest on her knee.

== Gallery ==
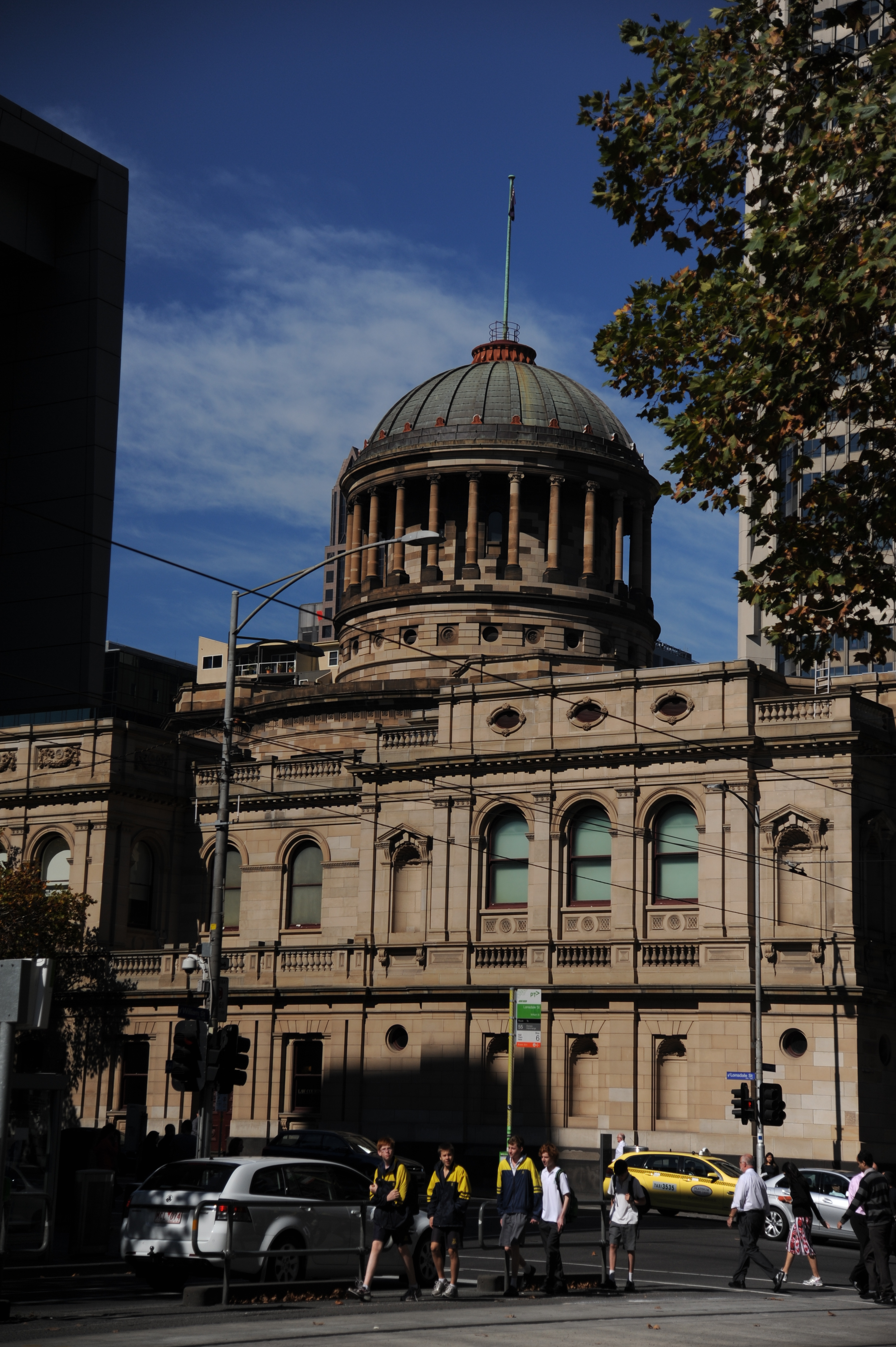
Tower dome of the Library

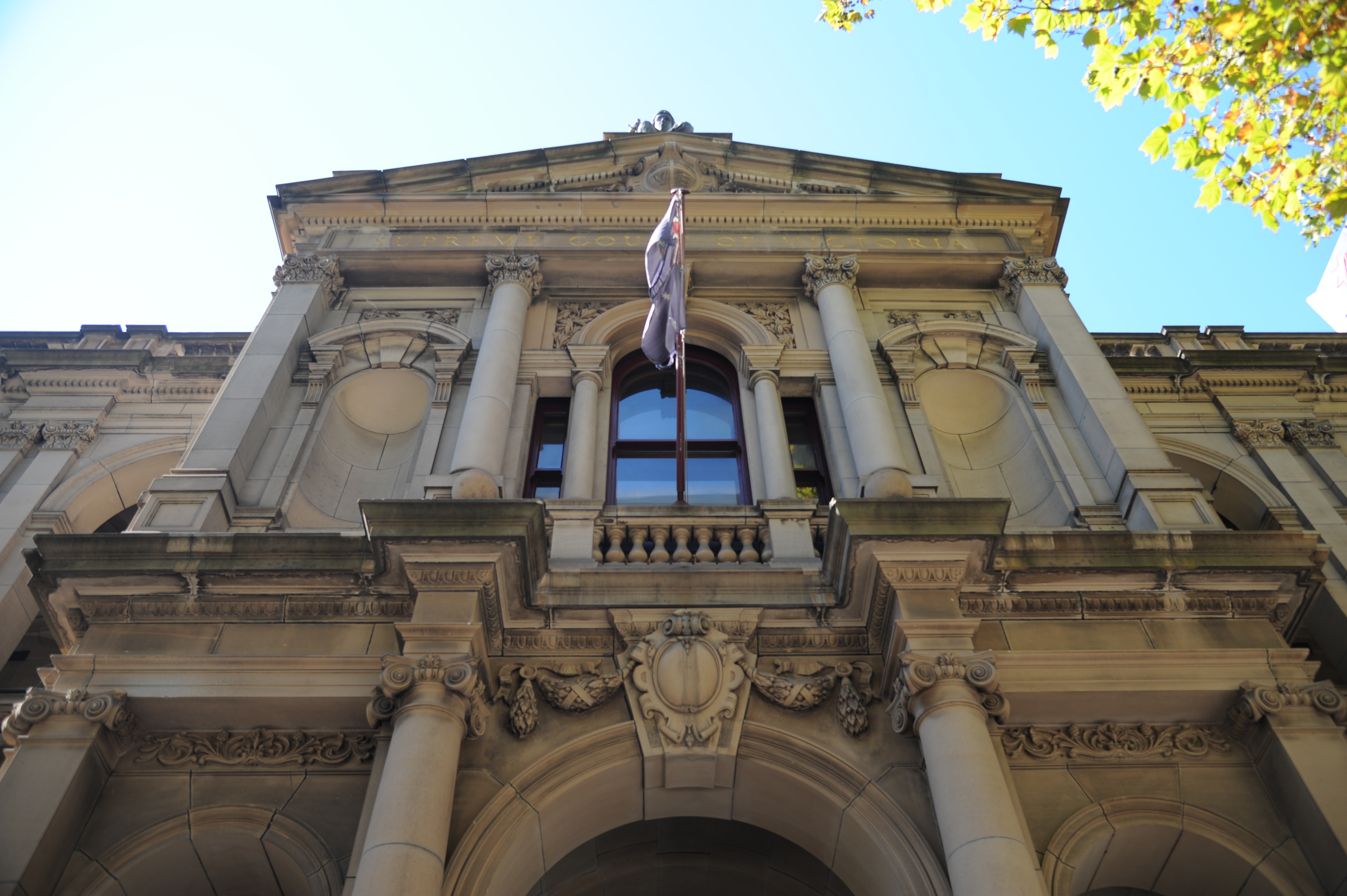
William Street entrance

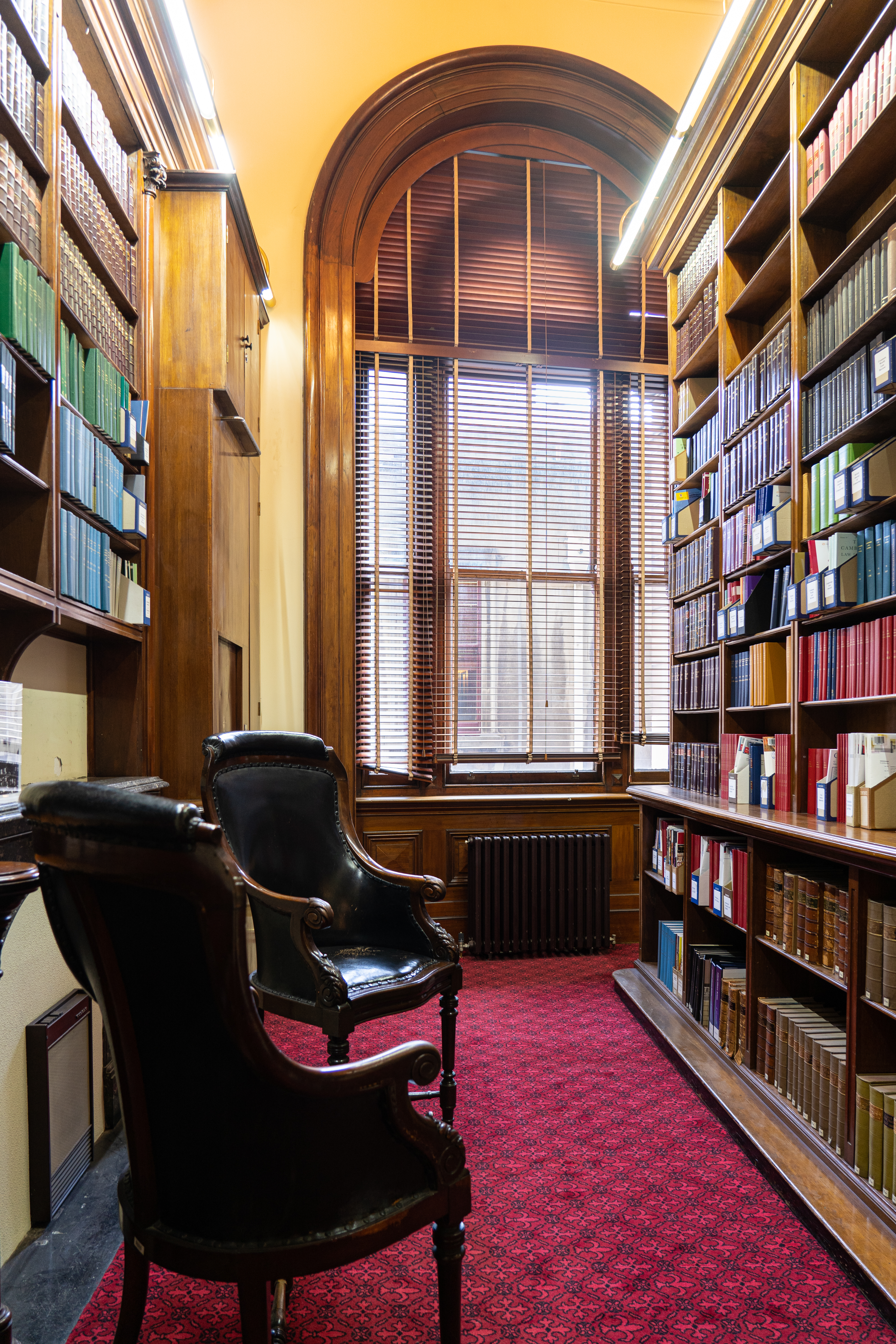
Shelves of law reports within the Library

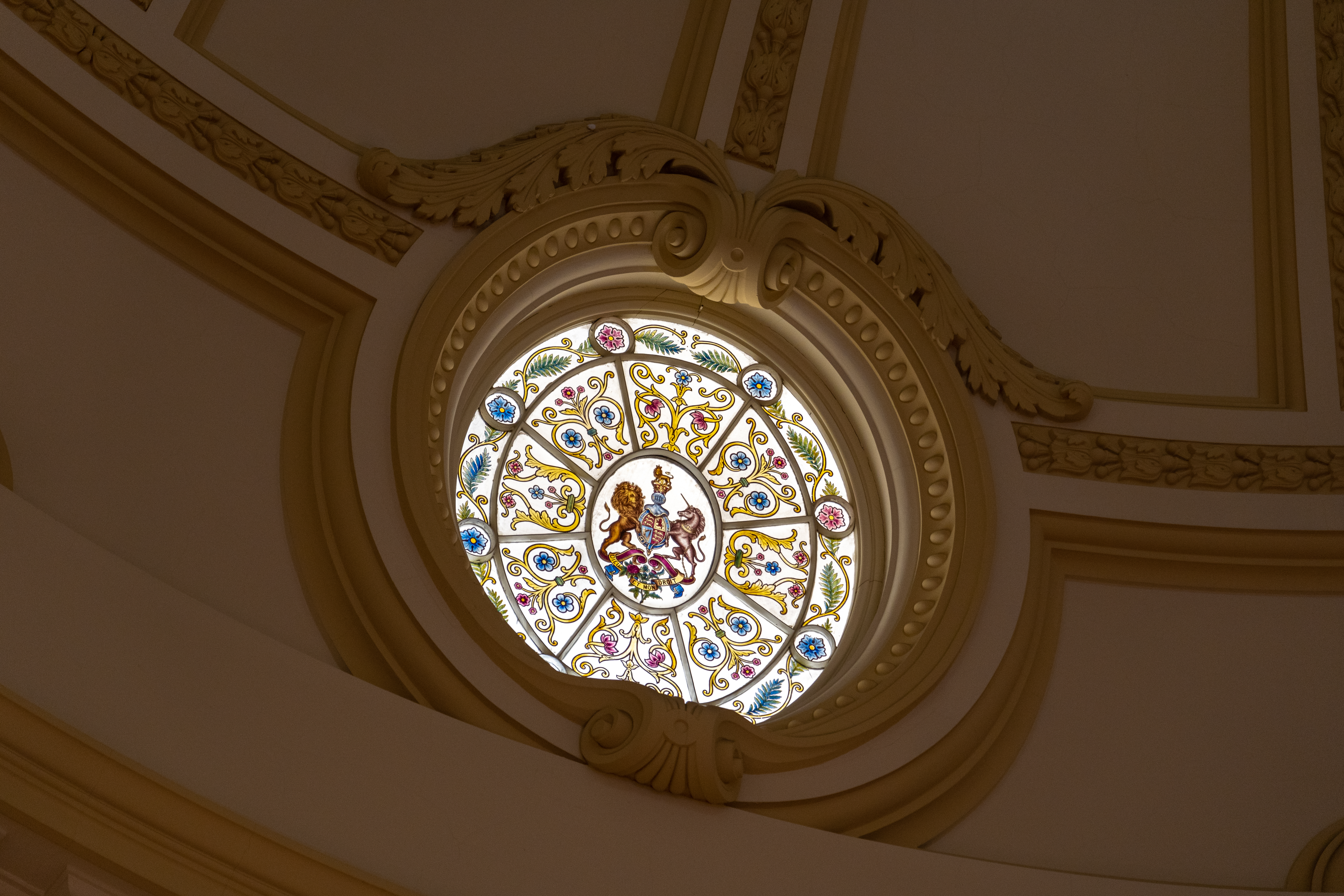
A stained glass window set into the inner dome above the Library

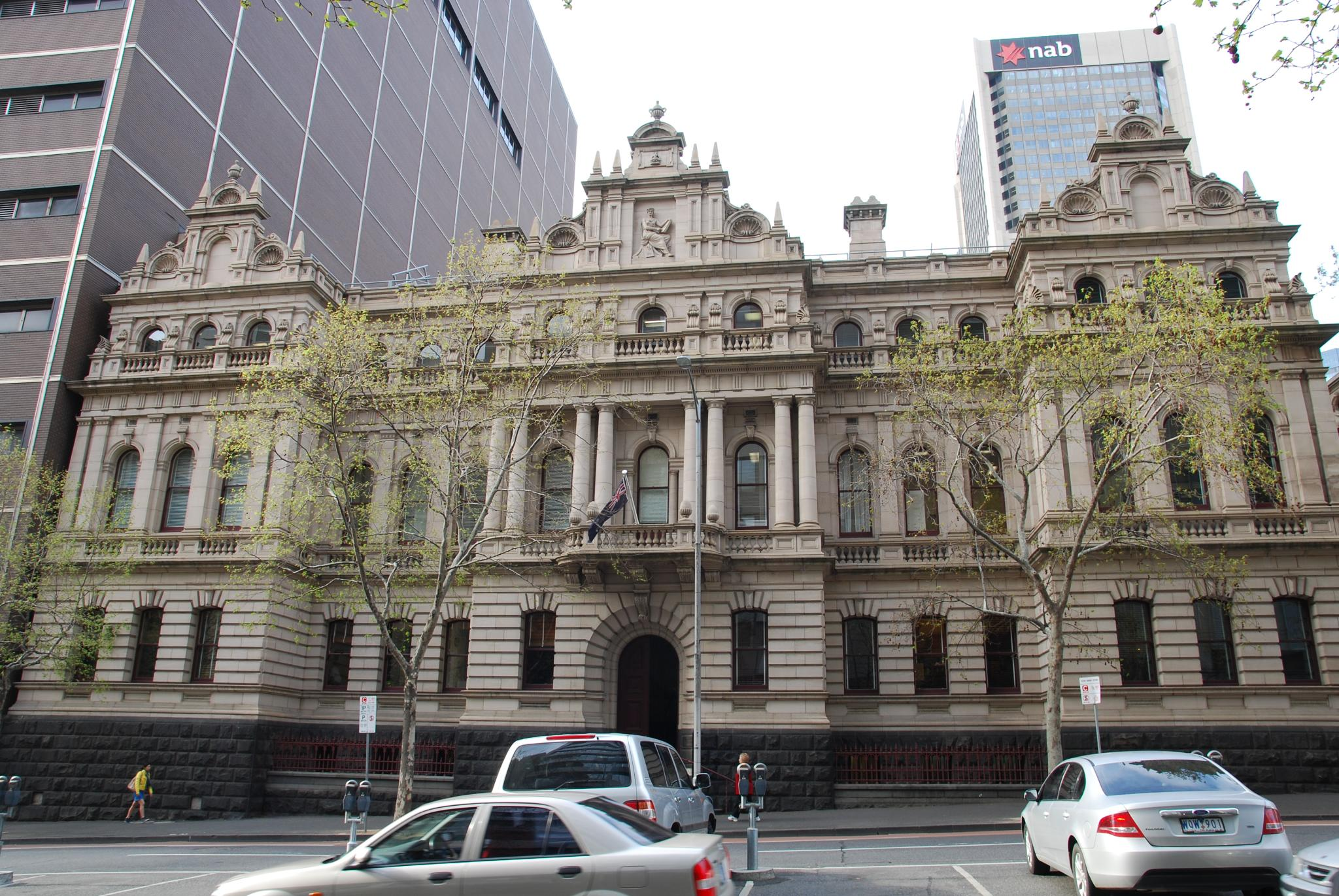
Facade of the Court of Appeal

== See also ==
- Architecture of Melbourne
- List of heritage-listed buildings in Melbourne
- Victorian architecture
