= Smith & Johnson =

Architectural firm in colonial Australia

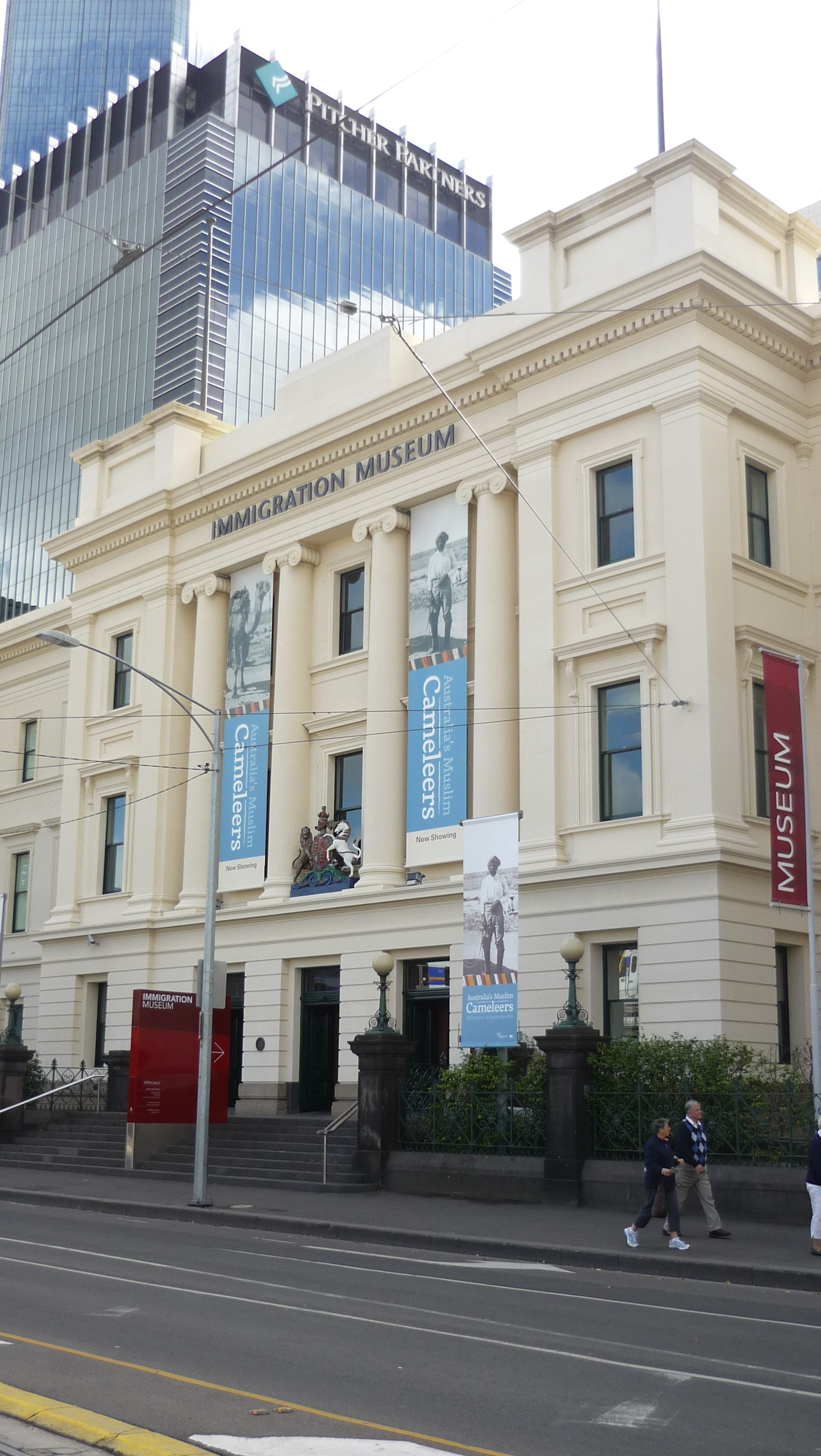
Current photo of the Old Customs House designed by Arthur Johnson. 400-424 Flinders Street, Melbourne

Alfred Louis Smith and Arthur Ebden Johnson were architects who designed many public buildings of Melbourne in the classical style.

Both architects emigrated to Melbourne from London where they had been trained by leading British architects and designers in the execution of the classical style. After meeting each other in the Colonial Architect's Department they opened a private practice connected with the Public Works Department (PWD). Despite the popularity of other architectural styles of the time such as Gothic, Smith and Johnson practiced in a time when the dignity of classical architecture was still considered the right and proper style for town halls, museums, art galleries and post offices. This perception of public buildings coupled with Smith and Johnson's background gave them great opportunities to execute instrumental buildings in a burgeoning new city flooded with the prosperity of the 1851 Victorian Gold Rush.

Works completed by Smith and Johnson included the Bank of Victoria, Imperial Insurance office, and Baring Chambers in Market Street, the Athenaeum, Union Bank and Ebden's house in Collins Street, the Fire Brigade Station in Eastern Hill, Esplanade Hotel in St Kilda and adjoining residence, the old Fish Market, Presbyterian Church in William Street, numerous banks and large residences, the Melbourne Law Courts, and the Colonial Bank.

Their commitment to architecture in Victoria was further exemplified when, in 1856, with T.J. Crouch they were founders of the Royal Victorian Institute of Architects (RVIA), and became members of the Philosophical Institute of Victoria (Royal Society of Victoria) in 1858/59.

== Arthur Ebden Johnson, 1821–1895 ==
Born in the south of England, Johnson studied at the Royal Academy and Royal Institute of British Architects, and was a pupil of Philip Hardwick in London. At the age of 17 Johnson committed to a 5-year apprenticeship with the firm of Wigg & Pownall in London. In 1840-1 he was awarded a prize from the Architectural Association for the greatest number of approved sketches. In 1843 Johnson was awarded the Soane medal for his entry in response to the Royal Institute of British Architects brief for the design of a 'Princely Palace'. Johnson's design was entitled 'A Princelie Palace in the Elizabethan Style' (the drawings are held by the RIBA).

In 1846 at the age of 25 Johnson became partner of Horace Jones, city Architect of London; who in conjunction with Mr. Pearson erected Weighbridge Church in Surrey. Jones is best known for his later work in the design of Tower Bridge, London.

In 1845 Johnson received the Gold Medal from the Royal Academy for a design for a National Record Office. He left the U.K. and emigrated to Melbourne in 1851. In 1858 Johnson entered a competition for the design of the new General Post Office in Melbourne, and despite receiving the second prize, his design was ultimately selected for construction. He was then appointed in 1859 as an architect at the Public Works Department under the leadership of the newly appointed chief architect William Wardell, initially to implement the GPO project. Johnson was one of the leading architects in the PWD, together with contemporaries such as J.J. Clark. It was during this period that he met Alfred Smith, and it appears they may have cooperated even during the time of Johnson's employment at the PWD.

In 1873, and with Johnson still in the employ of the PWD, Johnson and Smith prepared a joint competition entry for the new Supreme Court of Victoria. The technical planning of this project was heavily influenced in the London Law Courts competition of 1868 (as were the other entries) and the submission was successful, creating serious embarrassment for Wardell. The issue was documented in evidence to the 1873 Royal Commission into the PWD. Later in 1873 Johnson resigned from the PWD and began the private practice "Smith & Johnson". The first project of the partnership was the Supreme Court design. Its implementation was delayed when the Chief Justice, Sir William Stawell, suggested that Smith & Johnson should abandon their submitted design and follow the plan of the Four Courts in Dublin. This scheme was adopted and the courts opened in February 1884. This led to a wide range of private sector commissions, in particular numerous bank buildings for the Bank of Victoria, headquarters for the Union Bank (1878) and a number of large houses in Toorak. The bank work was largely a continuation of commercial relationships established by Alfred Smith prior to 1873.

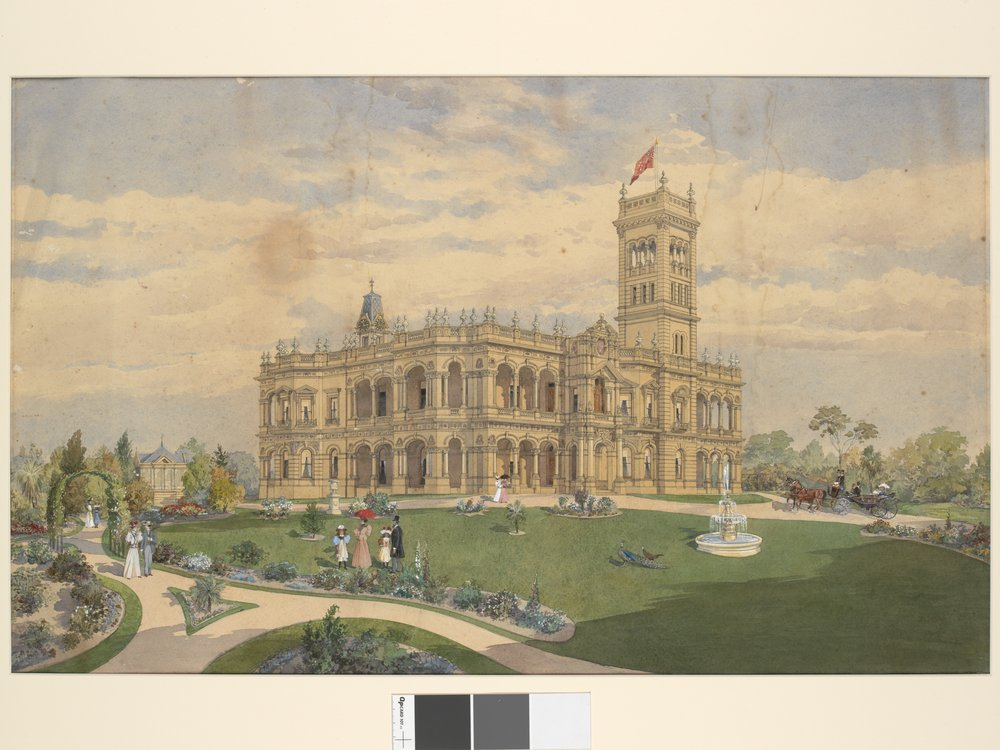
”Bracknell” was built in Toorak for property developer Matthew Davies in 1882. It was massively extended for him five years later by Smith & Johnson. (Painting by A.L. Smith)

In 1889 Johnson was awarded the silver medal for Architectural Designs and Drawings in connection with the Melbourne Centennial Exhibition. Johnson became the Australian Institute of Architects's Victoria President from 1893 to 1895. Johnson died on 29 May 1895, aged 74.

== Alfred Louis Smith, 1830–1907 ==
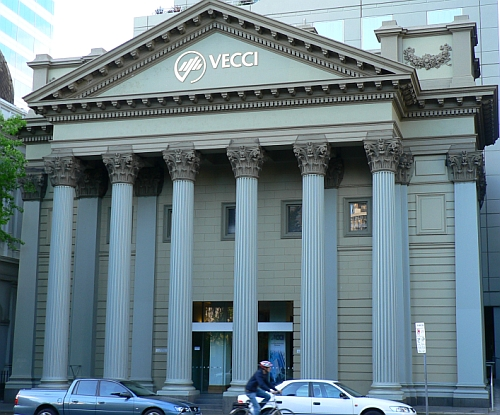
Former Baptist Church, Albert St, East Melbourne. Designed by Smith & Watts

Born in London, Smith trained under the Master Builder Thomas Cubitt, who was from a family of well-respected architects working in the classical style. This experience exposed Smith to an architectural practice involved in building major landmark structures in London. These included the enlargement of Buckingham Palace and the relocation of Marble Arch.

After emigrating to Melbourne in 1851 (a partial diary of his trip is held by the Brighton Historical Society), Smith was briefly employed by the Colonial Architects office. It was here that he may have met Arthur Johnson. In April 1852 Smith resigned from this position to establish a private practice, initially in partnership with Osgood Pritchard. For a time a young j.j. Clark helping them in the evenings. Later in partnership, from 1864 to 1870, with architect and surveyor Thomas Watts (c1826-1915), operating from Smith’s office in Bank Place. The two worked together on the designs of a number of large rural homesteads, such as that at Golf Hill Station. Among Smith & Watt’s major projects in the city in the mid 1860s were the designs for the Melbourne Sailors’ Home in Spencer St, the fish market in Flinders Street and the Baptist Church in Albert Street, East Melbourne.

Smith may have collaborated with Johnson during the period 1852 to 1873, though during this period Johnson was employed by the Public Works Department. It was not until 1873 with success in the Supreme Court competition, that Johnson resigned from the PWD and the practice of Smith and Johnson was formed, with the prime initial commission of the Courts complex.

In 1892 Smith was Elected Fellow at the RVIA. He died at Bedford Lodge, St.Kilda, on 18 October 1907, aged 76.

== Completed works ==
Work completed	Construction period	Architect(s)	Style	Location	Comments/use	Image
Model School, on site now occupied by the Royal Australian College of Surgeons	1854–1856	Arthur E. Johnson	Renaissance; Revival	250–290 Spring Street, Melbourne, Victoria	It was demolished in 1933 to make way for the new college structure built 1934 by J.C. Taylor. Originally built as an educational institution, the Model School was an important early example of school architecture in Victoria.	
Melbourne General Post Office	1859	Arthur E. Johnson	Renaissance; Revival	Corner of Elizabeth and Bourke streets, Melbourne, Victoria	Classically inspired and relies on the superimposition of the classical orders in a series of tiers over an arcuated base. This basic hierarchy of orders is derived from Colesseum in Rome. Johnson's original design was a two-storey structure with a striking mannerist tower. This was later extended into a three-storey structure with a new, and rather more conventional, clocktower by J G Knight. The building was never completed (the northern pavilion on the corner of Little Bourke Street was left incomplete). After a devastating fire in September 2001, Australia Post leased the complex to developers who remodelled the building as a shopping mall in 2004.	
Bank of Victoria commissions	1861–1876	Smith & Johnson	Renaissance; Revival	Various locations	The appointment of Smith & Johnson as the bank's architects, allowed them to explore a varied approach to the application of classical architecture. It appears this client relationship was developed by Alfred Smith prior to 1873. Smith worked in combination with various partners prior to 1873, including Watts, and after 1873 Smith and Johnson completed many of these financial institutions within Victoria. Surviving examples include Bank of Victoria branches at 81 Beechworth, Wangaratta Road, Beechworth, Victoria, in Bendigo, Dunolly and Donald, among others.	
Steam Packet Hotel	1862–1863	Albert L. Smith	Renaissance; Revival	13 Cole Street, Williamstown, Victoria	A cornice and string mould divides the storeys and symmetrical, architrave fenestration and corniced chimneys provide the Italian Renaissance derived ornament.	
Old Customs House refurbishment	1873	Arthur E. Johnson	Renaissance; Revival in the Victorian period	400–424 Flinders Street, Melbourne, Victoria	In his role in the Public Works Department Johnson remodelled the 1841 building with other Public Works Department architects John James Clarke and Peter Kerr. The Long Room on the first floor is one of the most elegantly proportioned and grandest classical interiors in Melbourne. Currently the Modern Immigration Museum, Melbourne.	
Como House	1874	Arthur E. Johnson	Late Georgian	Corner of Williams Road & Lechlale Street, South Yarra, Victoria	The house was bought by pastoralist Charles Armytage, husband of Johnson's sister in law Caroline. Armytage commissioned Johnson to add a classical ballroom onto the late Georgian white brick house (designed by others). Now considered as one of the finest examples of mid-Victorian architecture in Australia.	
Supreme Court of Victoria and Supreme Court Library	1874–1884	Smith & Johnson	Academic Classical, in the high Victorian period	192 Williams Street, Melbourne, Victoria	Smith and Johnson collaborated on a competition for the project in 1873, prior to Johnson's resignation from the PWD. The total complex, including the central library, was designed documented by the newly formed practice of Smith and Johnson, cooperating with the Public Works Department. The planning of the building is notable for a sophisticated separation of the main classes of users (judiciary, judges, public and prisoners) based on design models developed for the London Law Courts competition of 1868, and widely published. It also features an early example of a thermal chimney system for ventilation of the individual courts, using air drawn down into a subfloor area through a large shaft in the corner of each courtroom, and a cross ventilated false ceiling space creating negative pressure to draw air out of the court ceiling space. This system was necessitated in part by the use of large gasoliers to light the courtroom areas. The building features a large dome supported by columns of the ionic order. This area of the library structure is largely decorative (the main functional areas of the library are located in the lower two levels) and is heavily influenced by James Gandon's Four Courts in Dublin, Ireland.	
Golf Hill	1876	Smith & Johnson		Golf Hill, Shelford, Victoria	Commissioned by George Russell - a two-storey classical bluestone residence.	
Esplanade Hotel	1878	Smith & Johnson	Renaissance Revival in the mid-Victorian period	11 The Esplanade, St Kilda, Victoria		
Union Bank of Australia	1878	Smith & Johnson		351 Collins Street, Melbourne, Victoria	Also known as the Old ANZ Bank after it was taken over. Now demolished.	
Hamilton Club	1879	Smith & Johnson	Italianate style	Corner Grey St and Kennedy St, Hamilton, Victoria	Built as a men's social club the building was a symmetrical single-storey building with rendered facade and portico. Now Hamilton History Centre.	
Eilyer	1880	Smith & Johnson		Albany Rd, Toorak, Victoria	Residential brick Home built for Albert Austin a wealthy pastoralist. Now demolished.	
Athenaeum Theatre	1885–1886	Smith & Johnson	Renaissance; Revival in the mid-Victorian period	184–192 Collins Street, Melbourne, Victoria	Used for theatre and a library, the Athenaeum was first known as the Melbourne Mechanics' Institute. The stuccoed brick exterior is decorated by large Corinthian pilasters and has a parapet containing a statue of Minerva.	
Eastern Hill Fire Station	1893	Smith & Johnson	English Baroque, with Queen Anne design elements	Corner of Victoria and Gisborne Streets, Melbourne	With Taylor & Fitts. The building features a two tiered arcaded veranda with both circular and elliptical arches and is dominated by the large watchtower. Situated on one of the highest spots in the city, it was an important means of spotting fires across the metropolis. The station currently occupied by the Melbourne Fire Museum and the Brigade continues to use part of the old station as office space.	
