= General Post Office, Melbourne =

Historic post office building in Melbourne, Victoria

General Post Office Melbourne
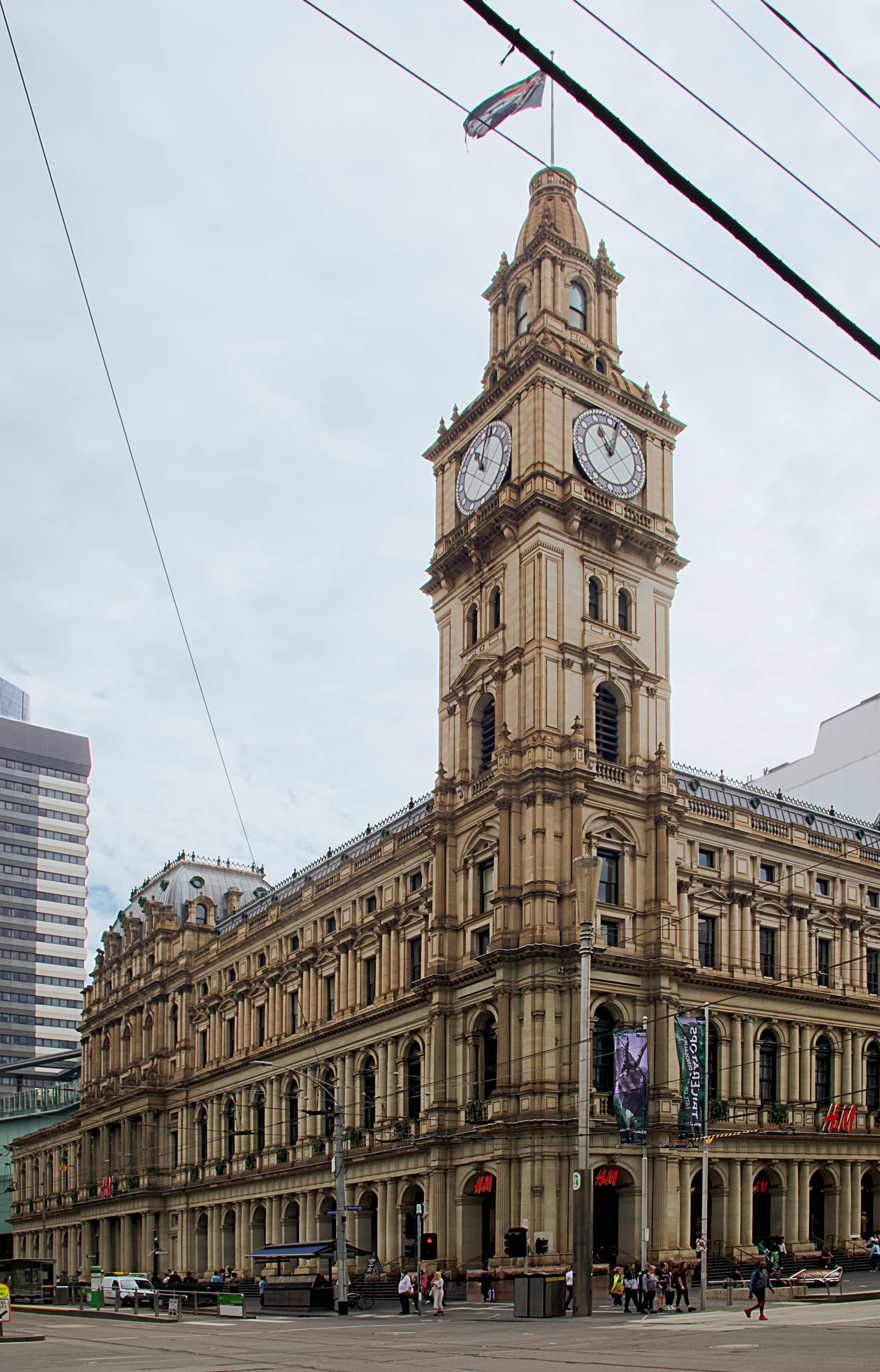
- General Post Office building

General information
- Status: Completed
- Type: Post office
- Architectural style: Renaissance revival
- Location: Victoria, 2/350 Bourke Street, Melbourne, Australia
- Coordinates: 37.81384°S 144.963028°E
- Current tenants: H&M, Federal Coffee Palace, Mama's Bưởi, Absolutely Altered & Tailored, Alto Event's Space, Designinc, Donald Cant Watts Corke, Ca de Vin, Gekkazan, Larsen Jewellery
- Construction started: 1861
- Completed: 1907; 119 years ago
- Client: Government of Victoria

Design and construction
- Architects: A. E. Johnson & William Wardell
- Designations: Commonwealth Heritage List & Victorian Heritage Register

The General Post Office, situated on the corner of Elizabeth and Bourke streets in Melbourne, is the former General Post Office for Victoria, Australia.

Still owned by the Federal Government, the building appears on all major heritage lists: the National Trust of Victoria (Australia), the Commonwealth Heritage List, and the state of Victoria where it is noted for its fine and impressive architecture and historical significance. The location of the post office is still used as a point of reference for the measure of distances from the centre of Melbourne.

== Significance ==
The General Post Office is historically significant as one of the foremost public buildings in Victoria, both architecturally and as the centre of postal communications for the Colony of Victoria, being the conduit of communication with other colonies, and the United Kingdom, the birthplace of most 19th century Victorians. It retained this central postal role for much of the 20th century, adding telegraphic and telegram functions. The surrounding steps and clock tower are city landmarks and have prominently featured in meetings, protests, and Armistice Day and New Years Day celebrations.

The building occupies the north-eastern corner of the Elizabeth and Bourke Street intersection. The design is a fine and elaborate example of Renaissance Revival, with its use of arcading, pedimented windows, and layers of attached and overlaid columns, piers and pilasters, employing the characteristic order of Tuscan columns in the first level, Ionic columns in the second and Corinthian columns in the third. The use of Mansard roofs on central and end sections set slightly forward of the main walls add a French Second Empire flavour.

== History ==
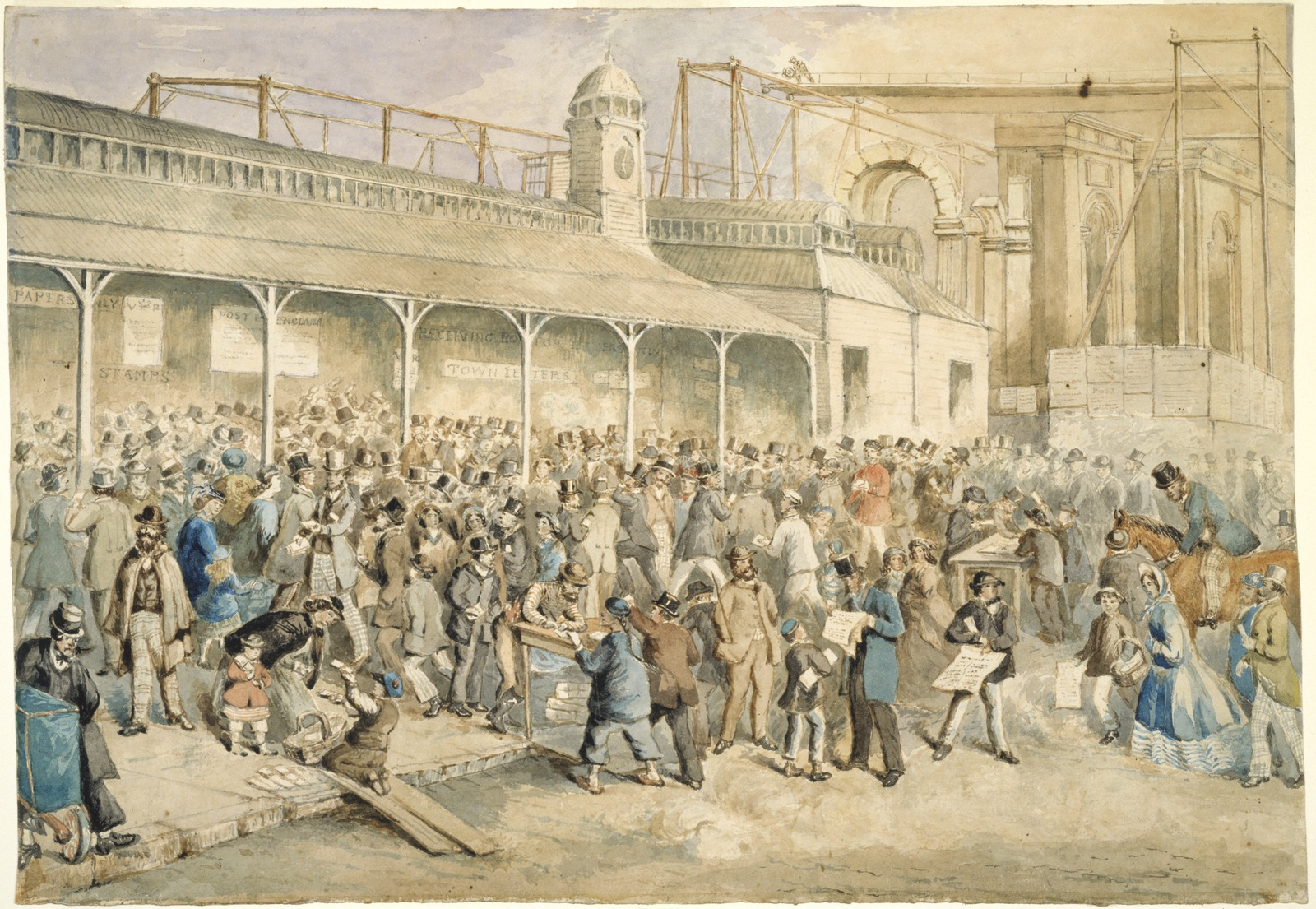
Arrival of overseas mail in 1862. The new GPO building can be seen under construction in the background. State Library Victoria Pictures Collection.

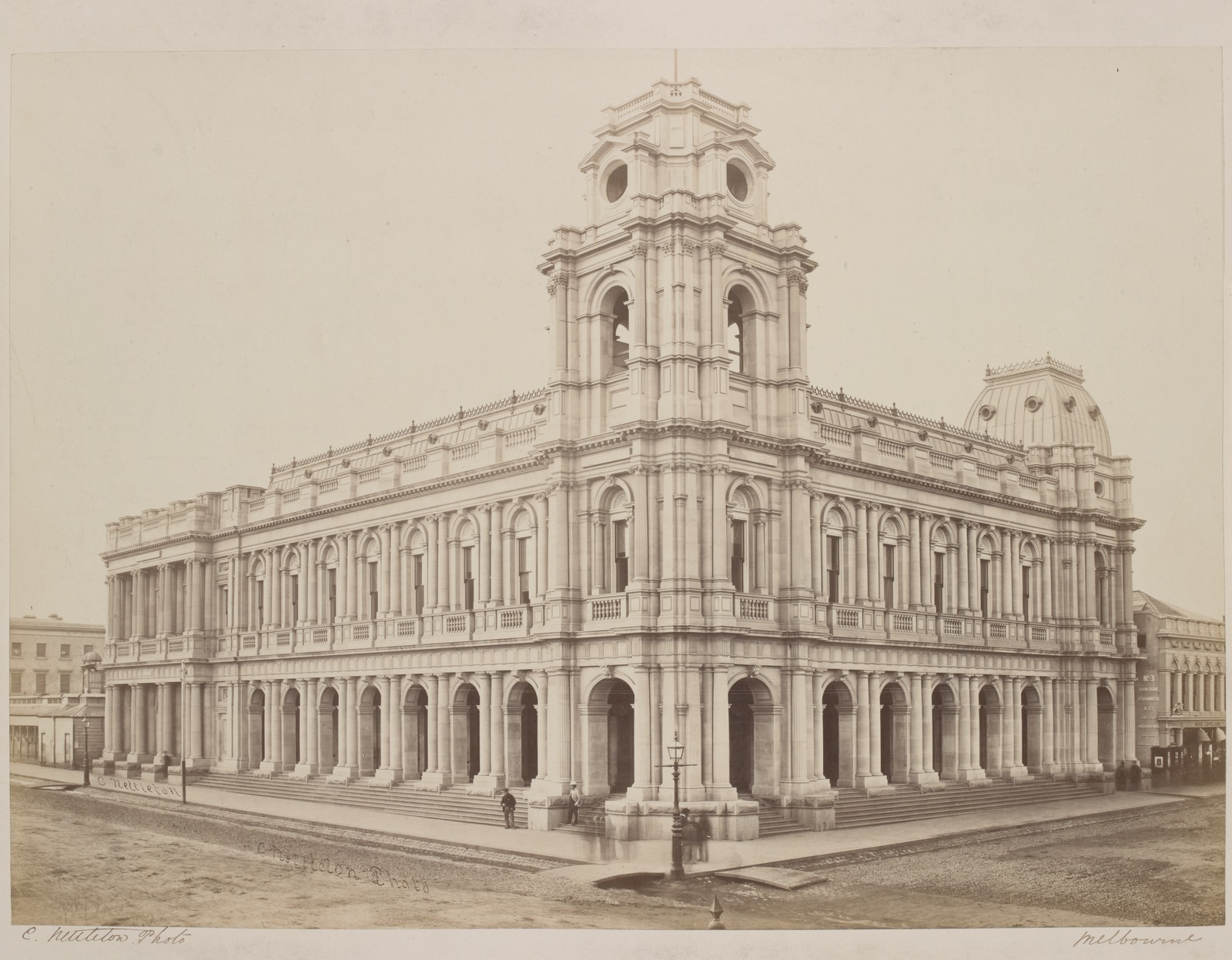
Melbourne General Post Office Charles Nettleton 1868 State Library Victoria H868 H141622

A post office was first established in Melbourne on 13 April 1837, but it would not be until 1841 that a permanent post office building would be erected on the site of the present GPO.

=== Design competition (1858) ===
In 1858 a design competition was held for a new General Post Office building, with the winners announced on Friday 7 May 1858. The competition was in two parts, Crouch and Wilson won first prize for their exterior design, while Arthur Ebden Johnson won second place for exterior, and also won second place for the interior arrangement. The first prize for the interior was awarded to British architect Edward Rumsey. Johnson was then employed by the Public Works Department, and eventually construction started in 1861 on what was said to be Johnson's design, rather than the Crouch and Wilson design, which proceeded slowly and at great expense. In 1861 however, Johnson himself claimed that it was an entirely new design prepared by the Public Works Department.

=== Initial construction (1860–1867) ===
The 1861 design consisted of two storeys, taking up the full site, with a main floor fronted by arcades raised up on a stepped plinth (possibly due to the frequent flooding of Elizabeth Street), mansard roofed end and central pavilions, and a corner clocktower. Construction of this design ceased in 1867, without the northern half of the Elizabeth Street wing, the central mansarded portion or the mansarded roof to the tower. The grand hall, lit by a skylit roof, was designed as the mail sorting room; the public transacted all business outside, at window-counters opening into the arcade, with various counters designated for different purposes. It was constructed with bluestone from Brunswick quarries, and sandstone from Tasmania for the facade, including the Doric and Ionic columns.

=== Additions (1887) ===
After 20 years, with the rapid growth of Victoria, the General Post Office became overcrowded, and A. E. Johnson designed a third level, an attic level, and a taller and more ornate clock tower with sandstone sourced this time from the Grampians. This work was supervised by Peter Kerr of the Public Works Department and was completed in 1887 (leaving the Little Bourke Street end still incomplete). The Mansard roof originally intended for the central section of the Elizabeth Street facade was also constructed, as well as similar curved roofs as part of the tower, which, along with the increased height, gave the building much of its Second French Empire grandeur. The clock was made in Williamstown with parts from Glasgow. The clock plays 28 tunes. In the early years, it would play one tune every 15 minutes, all day and night.

=== 20th century ===
In 1906–07, the GPO was extended to the north in Elizabeth Street by five bays. The new façade matched the original design, although there were only two storeys and a basement.

In 1913, it was decided to remodel the building, turning the sorting hall into a public postal hall, with entrances from both Bourke and Elizabeth Streets. Architect Walter Burley Griffin was hired to design the works. His plan was later modified by architect John Smith Murdoch of the Commonwealth Department of Works and Railways, and finally completed in 1919.

One of Melbourne's major grand 19th century public spaces, the hall of the GPO served as such during the 20th century, and the steps were a common meeting place. For a period, there was a tradition of celebrating the New Year on the steps of the GPO as the clock struck midnight.

=== Closure and redevelopment ===
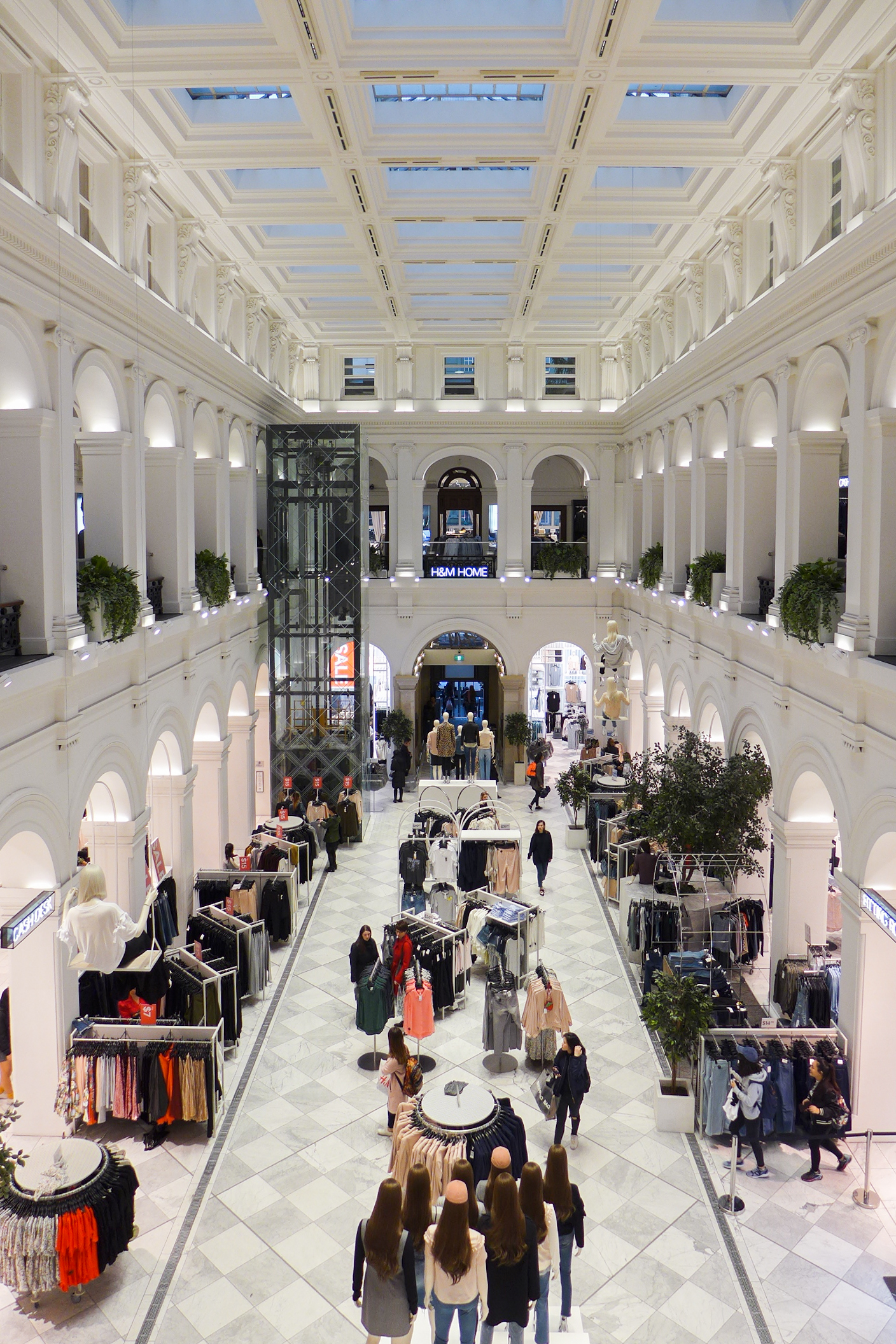
H&M became the GPO's major tenant in 2014

In the 1990s, Australia Post began a program of closing and selling or leasing out many of the large and historic post office buildings across Australia, moving post office functions into smaller shopfronts. In 1993, the closure of the Melbourne GPO was first announced and various commercial schemes proposed amid some controversy, but none proceeded until 2001, when it was leased to developers for conversion into a shopping centre, with contemporary extensions to the still incomplete north end. Shortly after postal functions were moved into a smaller building on Little Bourke Street a fire severely damaged the interior of the building, especially the postal hall, on 10 September 2001. The redevelopment proceeded as planned, including the restoration of the postal hall, and a contemporary styled extension, reopening in late 2004 as a high-end fashion retail precinct.

The redevelopment opened up a new link through the building to Little Bourke Street, and escalators in the new addition made the first and second floors easily accessible, and open to the public for the first time, with the old offices occupied by boutiques. Cafes occupied the delivery laneway on the east side, and part of the outer colonnade, while the hall itself was subdivided with glass walls into retail tenancies. This work was designed by Williams Boag architects, and won two Architect's Institute awards in 2005. A lift was added into the postal hall in 2010, but the development was not a commercial success.

The GPO was redeveloped again, reopening on 5 April 2014 occupied almost entirely by Australia's first branch of Swedish retail giant H&M, with crowds forming hours in advance. The cafes in the former delivery lane and the arcades remained in place, and the top (second) floor is occupied by offices.

== Gallery ==
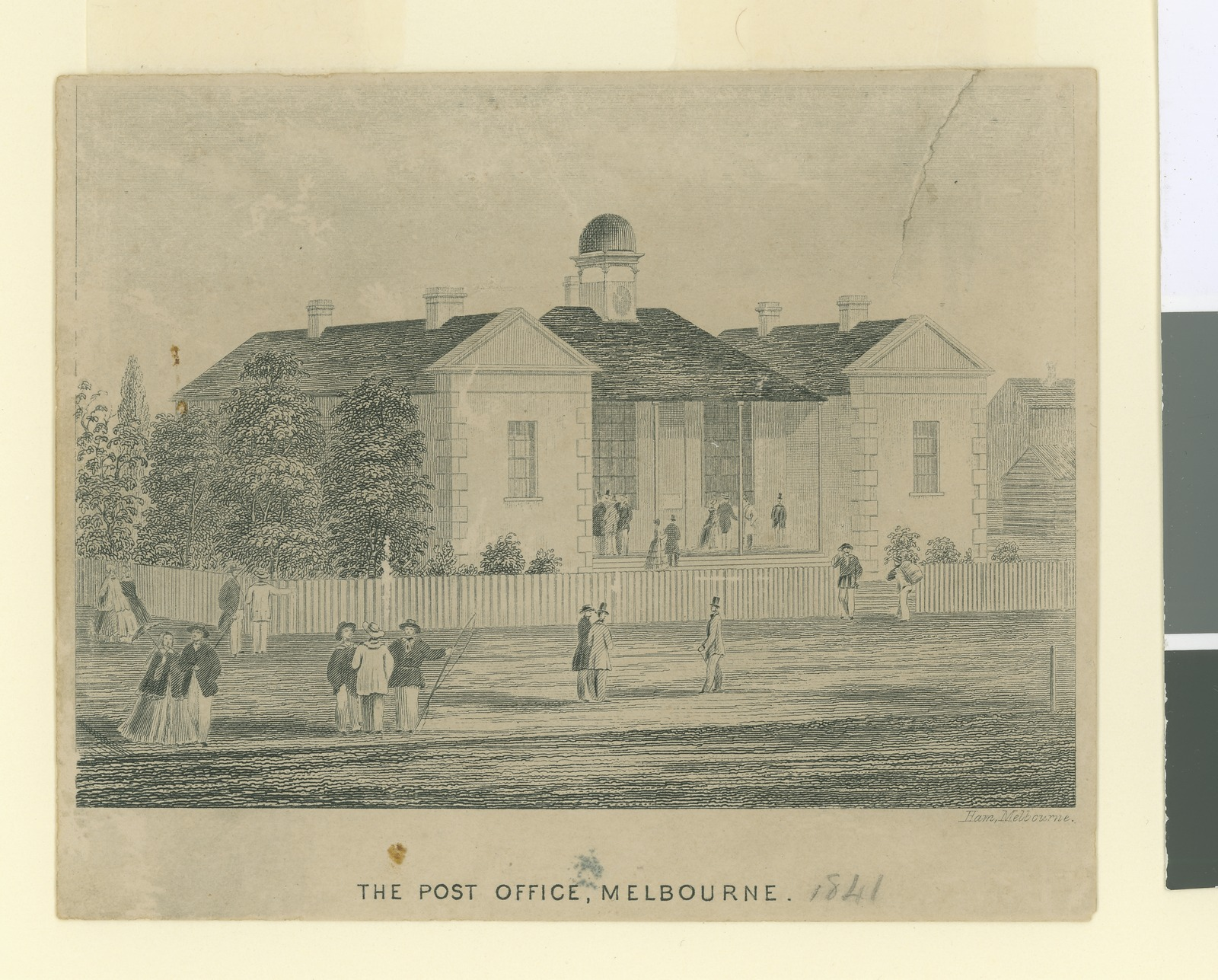
Original GPO building shortly after construction in 1841. State Library of Victoria Pictures Collection.

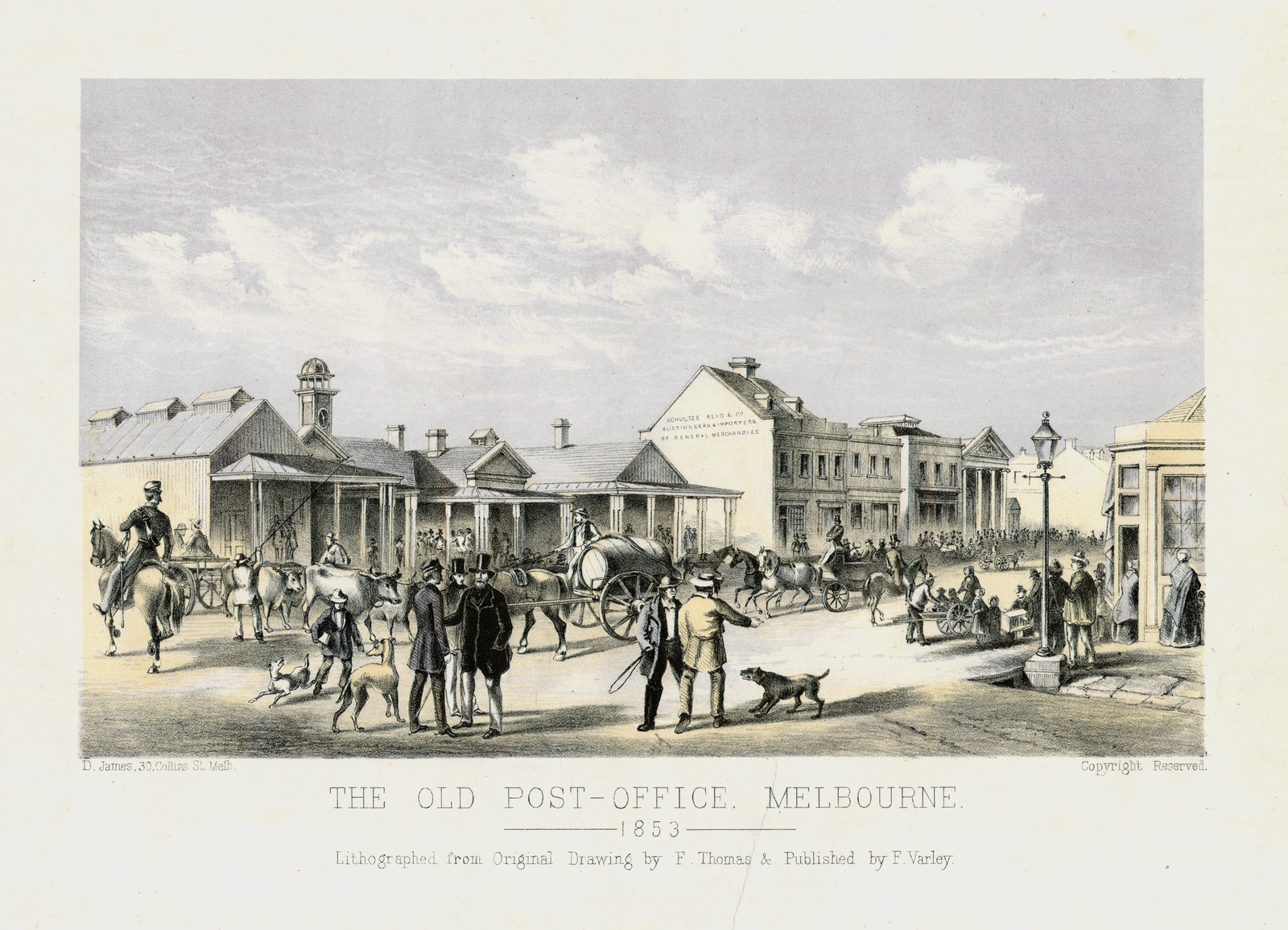
Original GPO expanded to accommodate Melbourne's population explosion in 1853. State Library Victoria Pictures Collection.

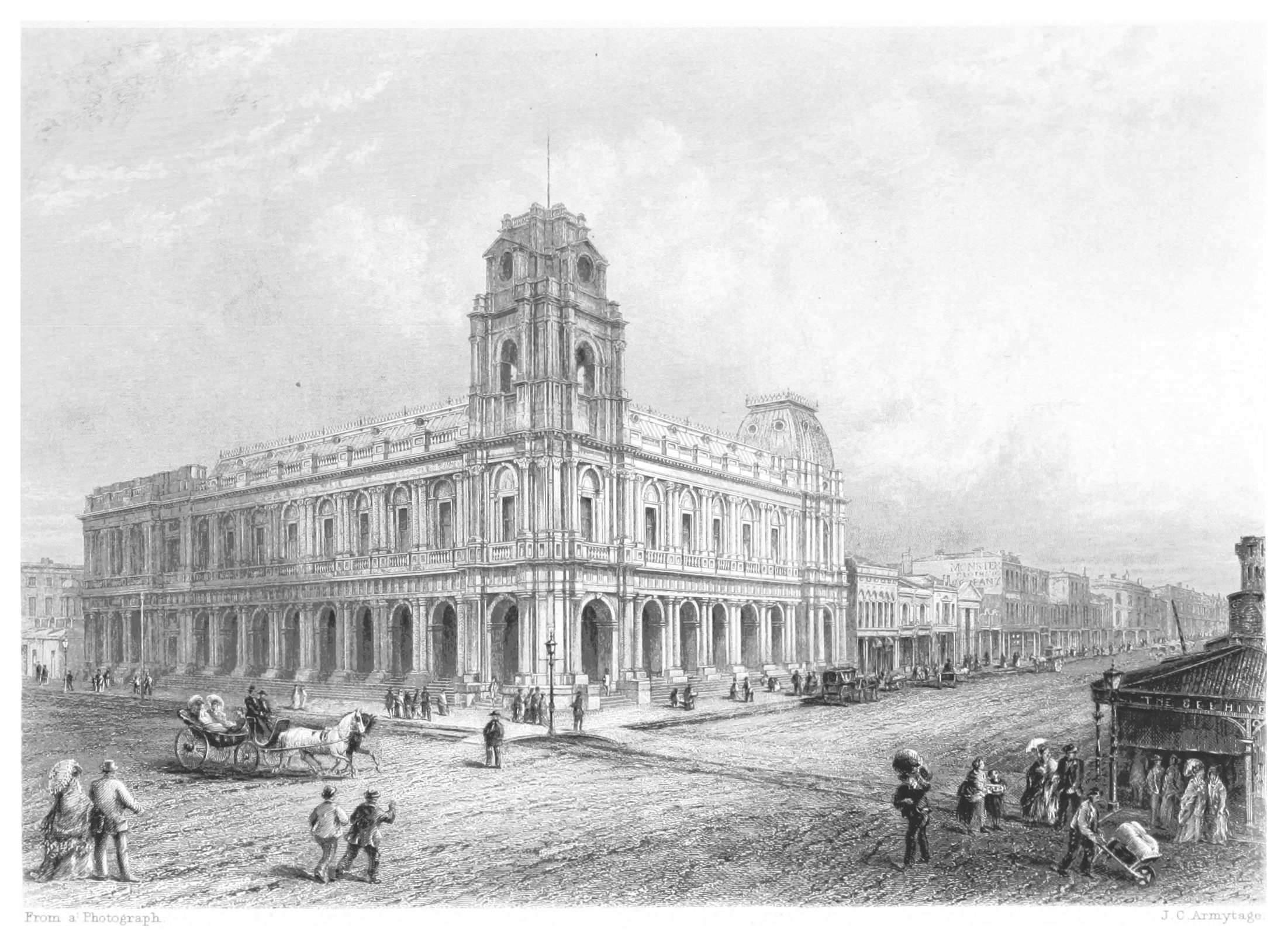
As completed in 1867, without north wing or central mansard roof

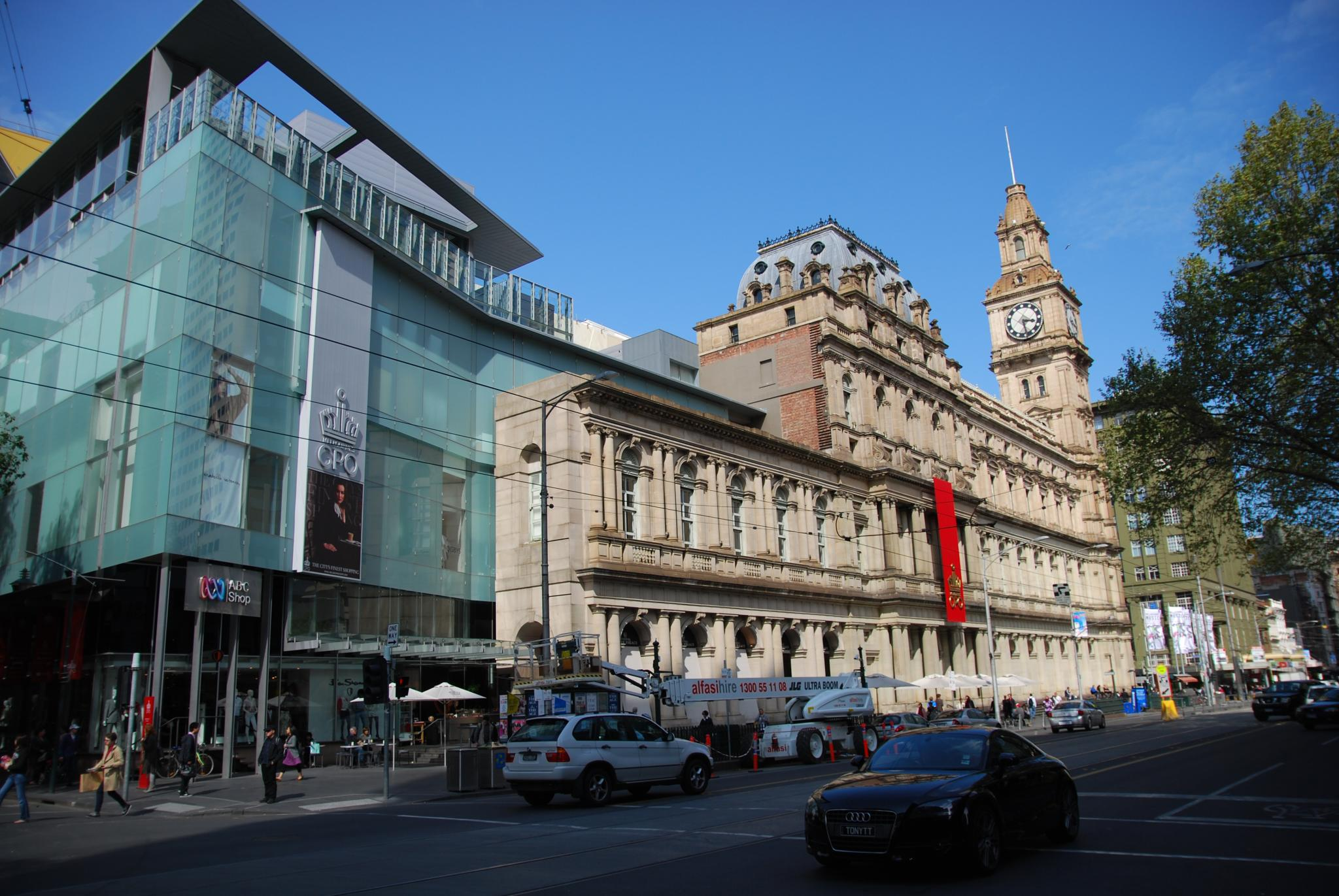
View from north along Elizabeth Street showing 2001 shopping centre extension

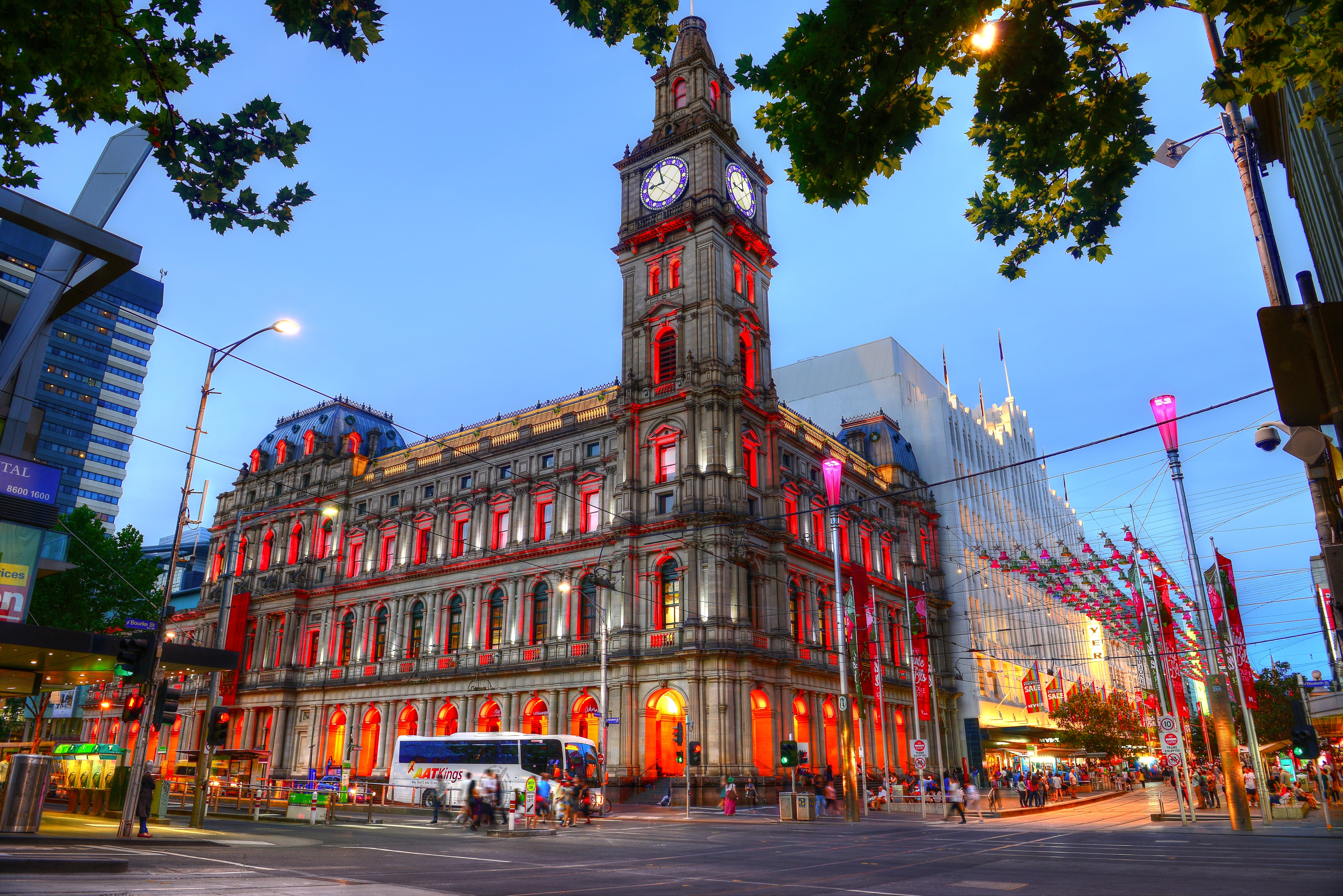
GPO at dusk

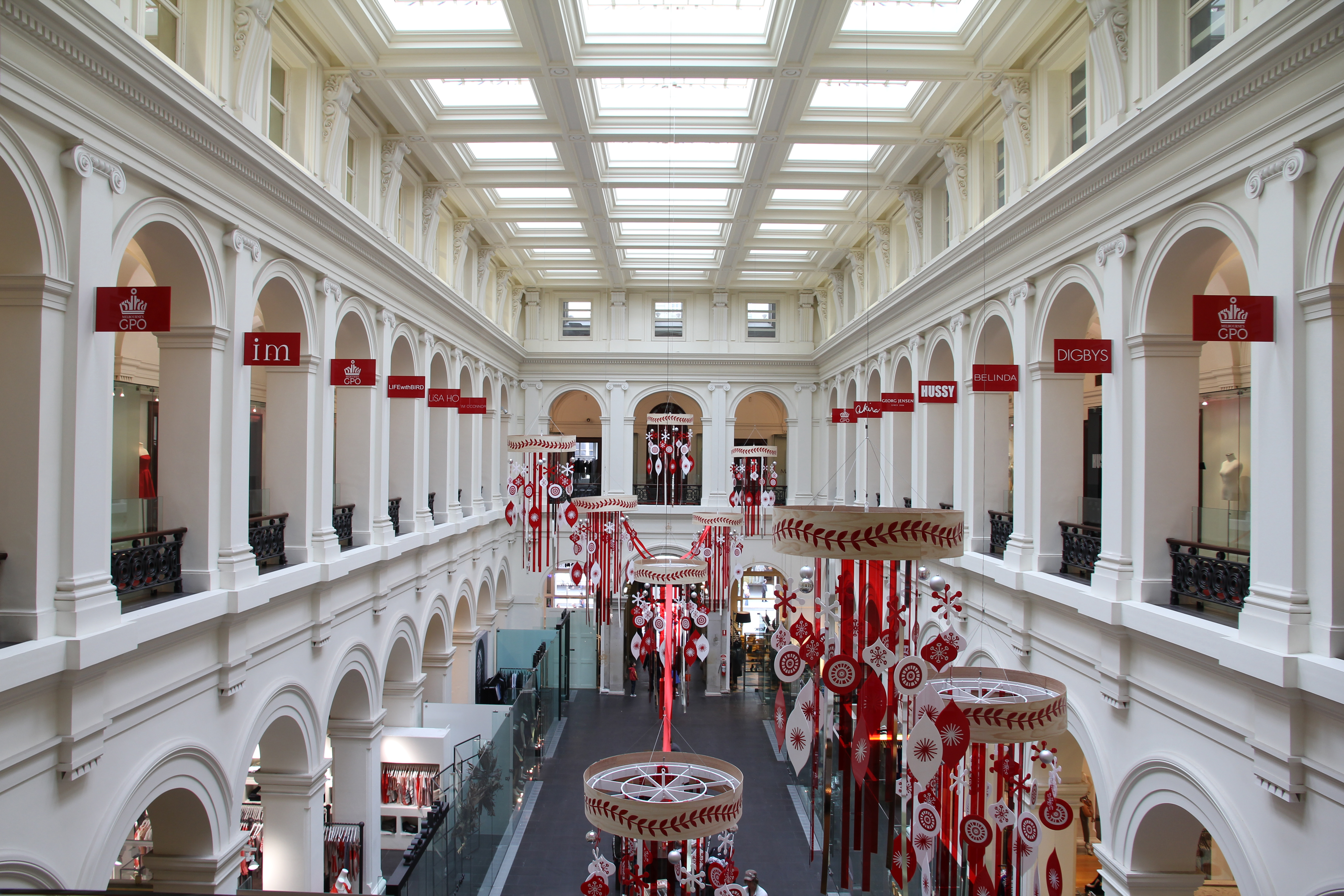
Interior of the former postal hall in 2007

The arcade along Elizabeth Street
