= Immigration Museum, Melbourne =

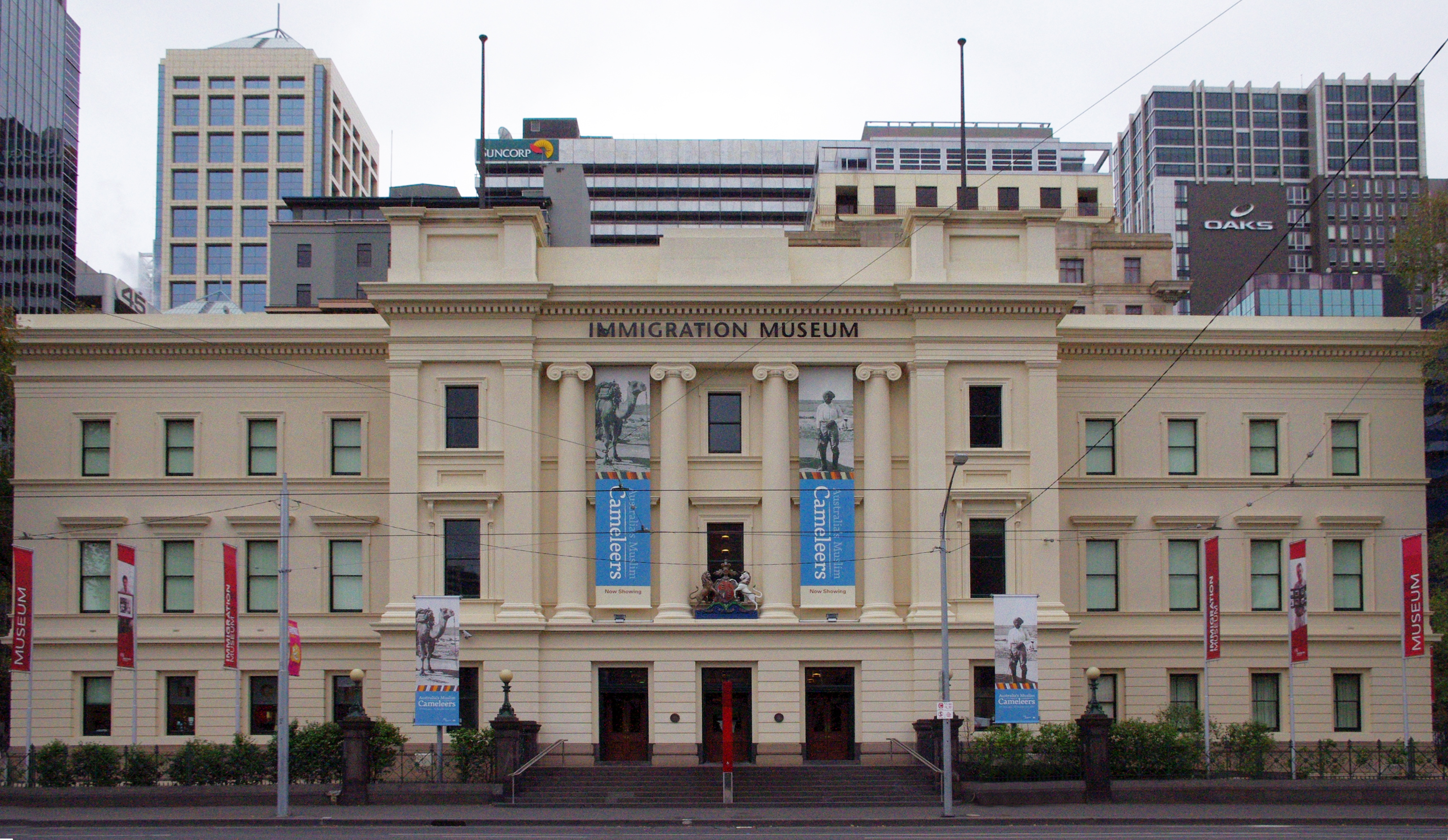
- Immigration Museum in Old Customs House

- Location of the museum in Melbourne
- Established: 1998; 28 years ago
- Location: Melbourne, Victoria, Australia
- Coordinates: 37°49′09″S 144°57′37″E
- Type: Culture museum
- Architect: Daryl Jackson (1998)
- Website: museumsvictoria.com.au

Old Customs House
- Interactive map of the Old Customs House area

General information
- Architectural style: Renaissance Revival
- Location: Flinders Street
- Groundbreaking: 1856
- Completed: 1876; 150 years ago

Design and construction
- Architects: Peter Kerr (1856); J. J. Clark (1876); A. E. Johnson (1876)

Victorian Heritage Register
- Official name: Former Customs House
- Type: Registered Place
- Designated: 8 September 1994
- Reference no.: H1047
- Heritage overlay no.: HO661
- Categories: Government and Administration; Recreation and Entertainment

Register of the National Estate
- Official name: Old Customs House, Melbourne
- Type: Defunct register
- Designated: undated
- Reference no.: 5194

The Immigration Museum is a culture museum that focuses on the immigration history of Melbourne and Victoria. Opened in 1998 as a division of Museums Victoria, Immigration Museum is located at the restored Customs House building on Flinders Street, in the city centre of Melbourne, Victoria, Australia.

The former Customs House building was added to the Victorian Heritage Register on 8 September 1994 in recognition of its historical and architectural significance; and, on an unknown date, was added to the now defunct Register of the National Estate.

== History ==
The first Customs House on this site next to the original river port was a tent, which was replaced by a two storey bluestone building in 1841. The great increase in wealth and trade of the Victorian gold rush in the 1850s led to a much more impressive design by Peter Kerr with a grand portico above prominent stairs, begun in 1856–58, but never fully completed. In 1873-76, the remainder of the building was built, with a simpler entrance facade in Renaissance Revival style, designed by Kerr with John James Clark and A E Johnson in the Public Works Department. The end result is one of Melbourne's grandest 19th century public buildings. Across the rear at first floor level, dramatic scale of the columned Long Room emphasised the importance of the Customs department.

The site was listed in 1948 as one of the key sites for the modernisation of Melbourne, when 11 storey £750,000 Customs House office tower was proposed.

Customs officers moved out in 1965, and the building was used as the Melbourne offices for the members of the Federal Parliament, and the interiors were variously altered.

Vacant since the early 1990s, it was then decided to create a museum of immigration. Designed by Daryl Jackson, the building was extensively restored and upgraded, with small extensions to the rear.

== See also ==
- List of museums in Victoria
