= John James Clark =

English-Australian architect (1838–1915)

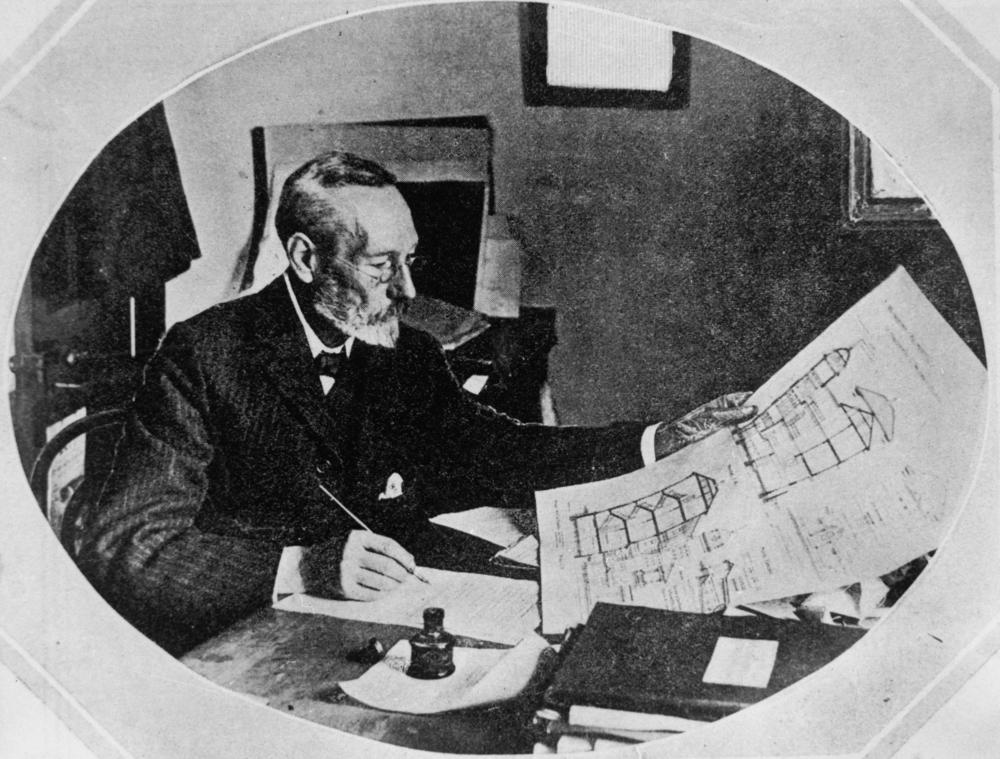
- J. J. Clark
- Born: 23 January 1838; Liverpool, England
- Died: 25 June 1915 (aged 77); St Kilda, Melbourne, Australia
- Education: Collegiate College, Liverpool
- Occupation: Architect
- Years active: 1852–1915
- Spouse: Mary Taylor Watmuff (m. 1844–1871)
- Children: Edward James (E. J.) Clark
- Practice: Colonial Architect's Office; Alfred Louis Smith; Osgood Gee Pritchard; Joseph Reed; Queensland Colonial Architect; J. J. Clark and Son
- Buildings: Old Treasury Building; Brisbane Treasury Building; Melbourne City Baths; see list below for more

John James Clark (23 January 1838 – 25 June 1915) was an Australian architect who began his career at the age of 14 in the office of the Colonial Architect's Office in Melbourne, immediately after his family migrated from Liverpool in 1852. Clark's 30 years in public service, followed by 33 in private practice, produced some of Australia's most notable public buildings, and at least one in New Zealand. He is most famous as the designer of Melbourne's Old Treasury Building when he was only age 19.

== Biography ==
John James Clark, commonly referred to as J. J. Clark, was born in Liverpool, England, on 23 January 1838 to parents George and Mary Clark. Clark was one of nine children. The family relocated from Liverpool to Melbourne, Australia in March 1852, in hopes of capitalising on the Victorian gold rush. Prior to leaving he had attended Collegiate College, Liverpool, where, aged thirteen, he won first prize for drawing a finely detailed map of Liverpool – every street, all public buildings and the docks.

Prior to his father and older brother seeking reward at the gold fields, the 14-year-old Clark – on the basis of his revealed abilities – was employed on 26 April 1852 as a 'drafting copyist' in the Colonial Architect's Office, ensuring his family an income. It is likely that he was employed and rapidly promoted despite his young age because the office found it hard to keep employees in the throes of the gold rush. To broaden his 'apprenticeship', he sought evening work with the partnership of Alfred Louis Smith and Osgood Gee Pritchard, and for a short time with Joseph Reed.

In 1854, he was promoted to draftsman, and in this role was part of the team that designed the Geelong Supreme Court the next year, and Government Printing Office in 1856, and the next year began design work on the Treasury Building when he was only nineteen. While its basement and ground level was being constructed in 1858, he took ten months leave to tour Europe and the United Kingdom, completing the design and overseeing the construction on his return. Clark continued in public service designing many public buildings large and small until 1878 when he was retrenched in the Black Wednesday dismissals.

In 1865, Clark married Mary Taylor Watmuff (1844–1871), who died at the age of 26 in 1871; The couple had one child in 1868, Edward James, known as EJ Clark. In 1870, they had moved into the East Melbourne home Clark had designed for them, which still stands. In 1889, when Edward was 21, Clark took him on a tour of Europe and America, mirroring that of the one he took in his own youth. He followed an artistic interest tutored by noted Colonial artist Louis Buvelot, who became a friend.

In 1880, Clark set up private practice in central Melbourne. Between 1881 and 1896 Clark relocated several times between Victoria, New South Wales, Queensland and Western Australia in pursuit of commissions and employment. One of Clark's most notable achievements, during this time, was his appointment as Queensland Colonial Architect. Results of this work scattered across Australia.

In 1896, Clark and his son formed a professional partnership that lasted until his death, and saw them complete works in Perth, Brisbane, Melbourne and Auckland, New Zealand. Clark died at his son's residence in St Kilda, Melbourne on 25 June 1915.

== Notable works ==
=== Old Treasury Building ===
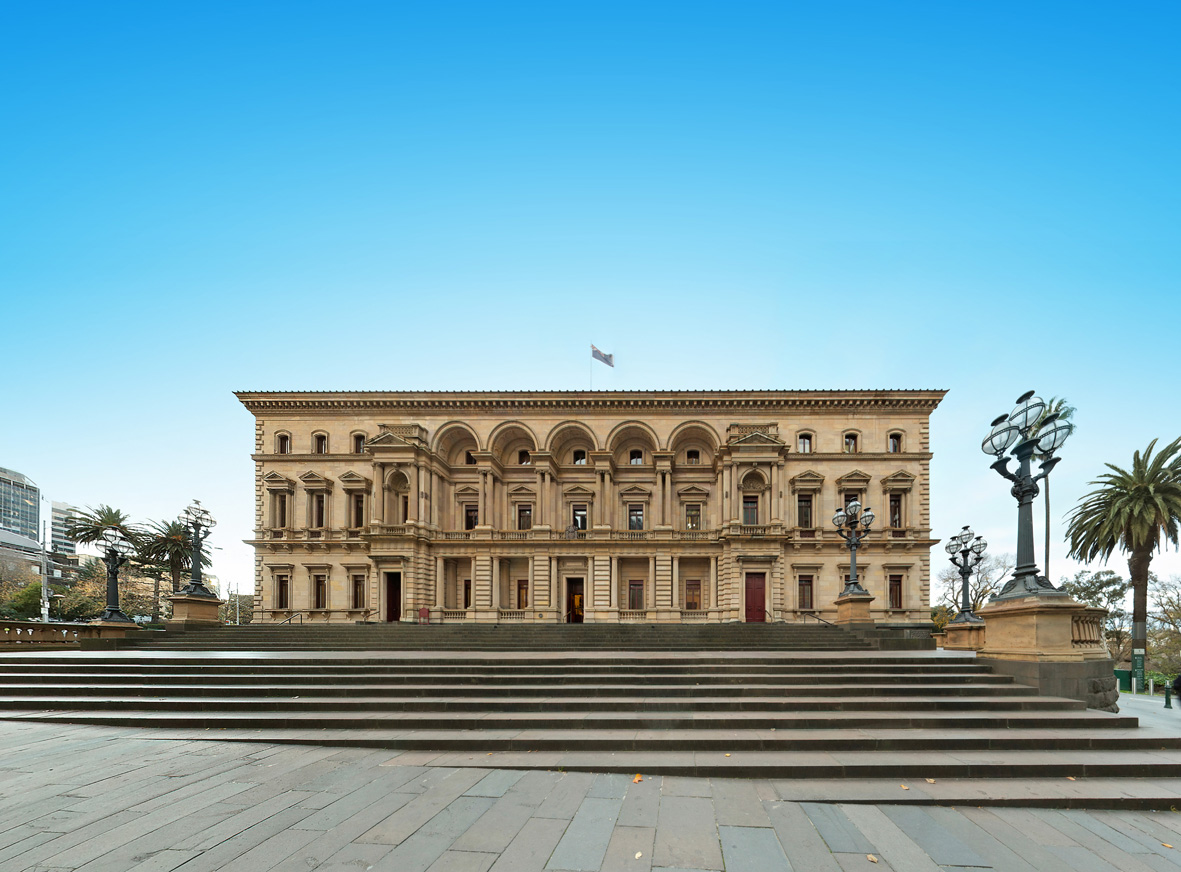
Old Treasury Building, Melbourne

The Old Treasury Building is considered one of the finest examples of Renaissance Revival architecture in Australia. Clark began designing this building in 1857 when he was only nineteen. Construction began in 1858 using bluestone from Broadmeadows for the foundations, and sandstone from Bacchus Marsh for the upper level facades. That year Clark took ten months leave to tour Europe and the United Kingdom, and on his return he completed the design, possibly changing that of the second floor, and removing the fourth level attic of the central section in favour of a continuous eave. The building was finally completed in 1862, but the forecourt was not built until 1868. Originally the Treasury Building was designed to hold Victoria's state gold, as well as offices for senior government positions. In 1874 the Treasury offices were relocated, and the building became known as the Old Treasury, and continued to house offices, including those for the Governor General. In 1992 the building was restored, and from 2005 it was the home of the City Museum.

=== Treasury Building, Brisbane ===
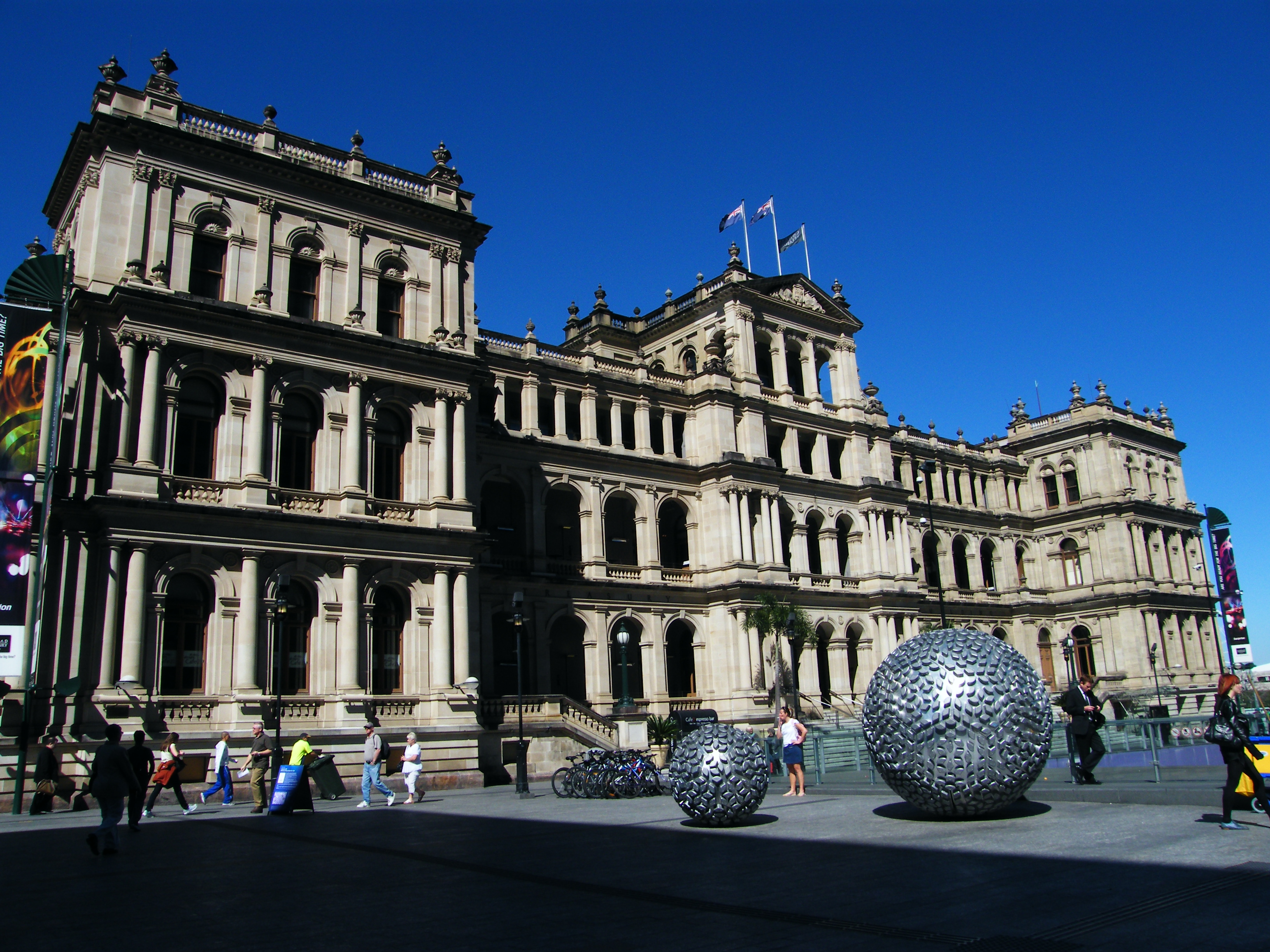
Treasury Building, Brisbane

Originally known as the New Public Offices, the Treasury Building occupies an entire city block surrounded by Queen Street, George Street, Elizabeth Street and William Street, Brisbane, in Queensland. Built in stages between 1886 and 1928, it was the seat of the state government public service for much of its impressive life. A design competition in 1883 was won by Melbourne architects Grainger and D'Ebro, but Clark, newly appointed as Queensland colonial architect, argued that the site warranted a larger design, and was commissioned to use his own Italianate design, entered prior to his appointment, as the basis. He resigned from that position in 1885, but the building was completed largely to his design, with arcaded loggias on three sides, and a lively composition of recessed and projecting bays and central pavilions above the cornice.

From 1995 to 2024 the building was occupied by the Treasury Casino and in September 2024, Griffith University announced that they would be purchasing the building, to use as a new inner-city teaching campus.

=== Melbourne City Baths ===
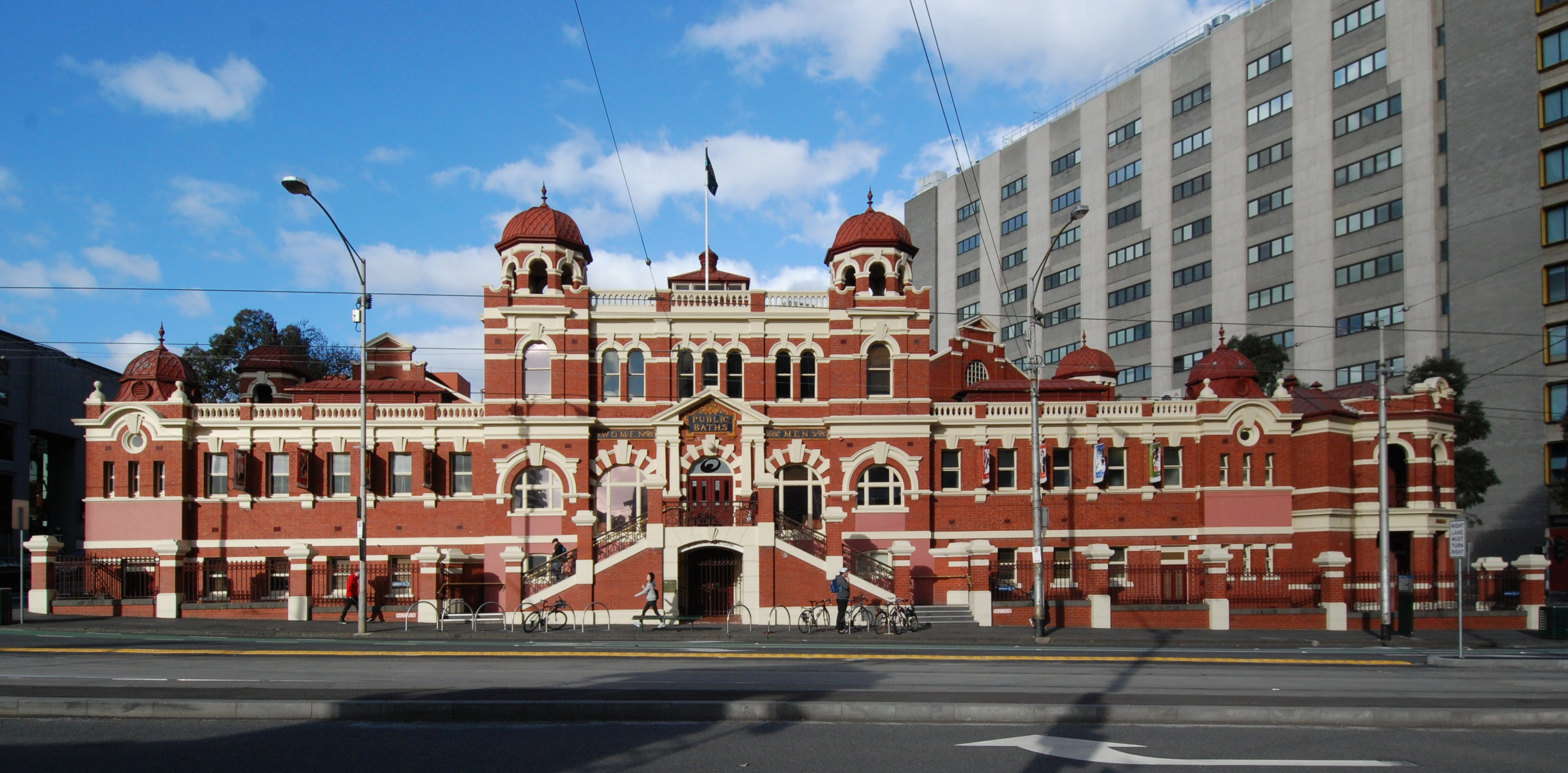
Melbourne City Baths

In 1902, Clark in partnership with his son, Edward James, won a competition to replace the old Melbourne City Baths, which were completed in 1904.

Considered a significant example of the Edwardian Baroque style, the building uses a two-tone palette of red brick and cream coloured rendered detailing. The highly articulated facade wraps around the corners of the triangular site, with a skyline of numerous domed cupolas. It is a popular Melbourne landmark.

=== Melbourne Hospital ===
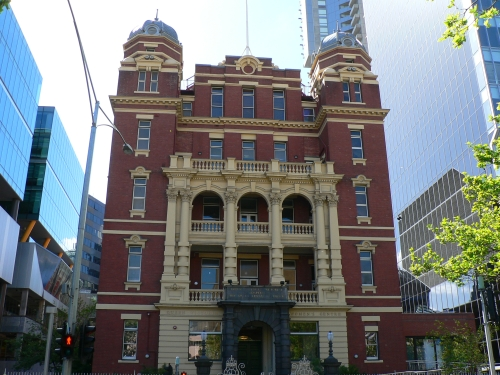
Melbourne (Queen Victoria) Hospital pavilion

In 1910, the partnership of JJ and son, EJ, were appointed to design the complete replacement of the old Melbourne Hospital, which occupied an entire block in the Melbourne central business district. The design consisted of a series of separate five- and six-storey pavilions in red brick Edwardian Baroque style, topped with numerous turrets, linked by walkways, and was completed in 1916. In 1944 the hospital relocated to Parkville, and the Queen Victoria Hospital, established by and for women, occupied the buildings. Closed in 1987, by 1994 all but the central pavilion fronting Lonsdale Street had been demolished. The pavilion became the Queen Victoria Women's Centre, the rest of the block becoming the Queen Victoria Village development.

== List of works ==
=== In Victoria ===
Melbourne

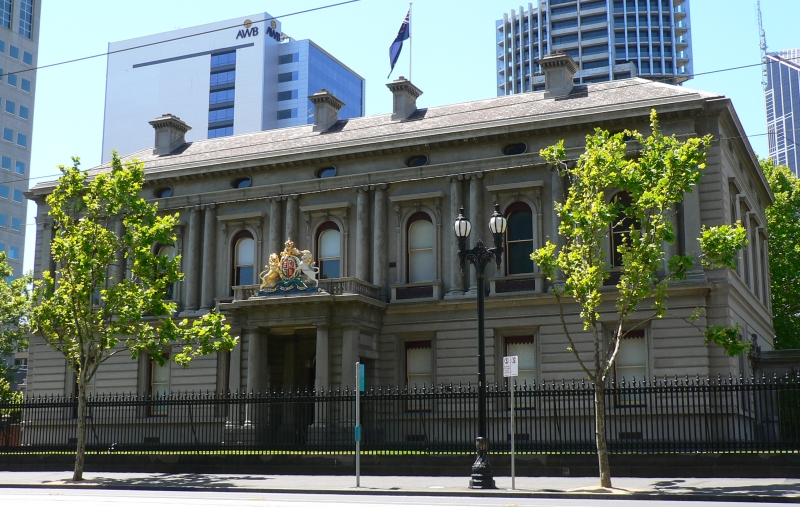
Royal Melbourne Mint

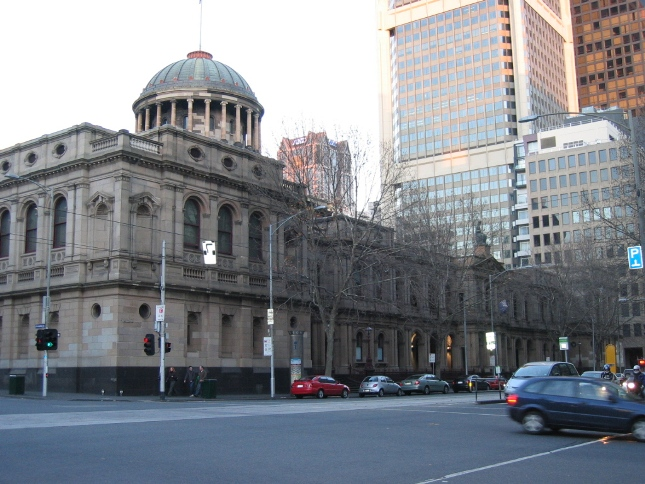
Supreme Court of Victoria, Melbourne

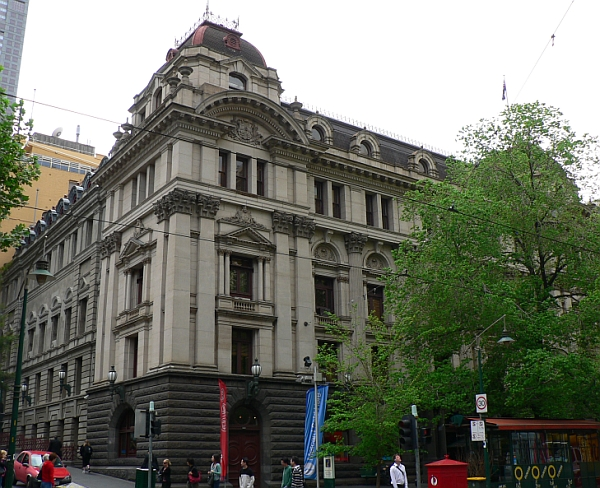
Melbourne Town Hall Administration Building

- 1856 – Government Printing Office
- 1858 – Old Treasury Building
- 1860 – Port Melbourne Court House (originally known as Sandridge Police Court)
- 1868 – Residence of Major General Sir Trevor Chute KCB, a Commander of British Troops
- 1869 – 104 Gipps Street, East Melbourne, as his personal residence
- 1869 – Richmond Town Hall
- 1871 – Royal Mint
- 1874 – Victorian Titles Office
- 1874 – Supreme Court of Victoria Library building (detailed plans)
- 1874 – Government House (detailed drawings)
- 1876 – Customs House (former)
- 1880 – Essendon and Flemington Institute
- 1887 – Melbourne Town Hall and Administration Building (detailed plans)
- 1903 – City Baths
- 1907 – Women's Hospital
- 1907 – Carlton Refuge
- 1912 – Melbourne Hospital which in 1946 became the Queen Victoria Hospital, Melbourne (partially demolished in 1994)
- – Port Melbourne Post Office

Regional

- 1855 – Geelong Customs House
- 1856 – Yackandandah Post Office
- 1855 – Geelong Supreme Court (demolished)
- 1860 – Morse's Creek (Bright) Post Office
- 1862 – Sale Court House
- 1863 – Newstead Courthouse
- 1863 – Kilmore Courthouse
- 1864 – Rutherglen Court House
- 1864 – Aradale Mental Hospital (as assistant of G. W. Vivian)
- 1874 – Castlemaine Post Office
- 1904 – Ballarat National Mutual Building
- – Beechworth Mental Hospital

=== In Queensland ===
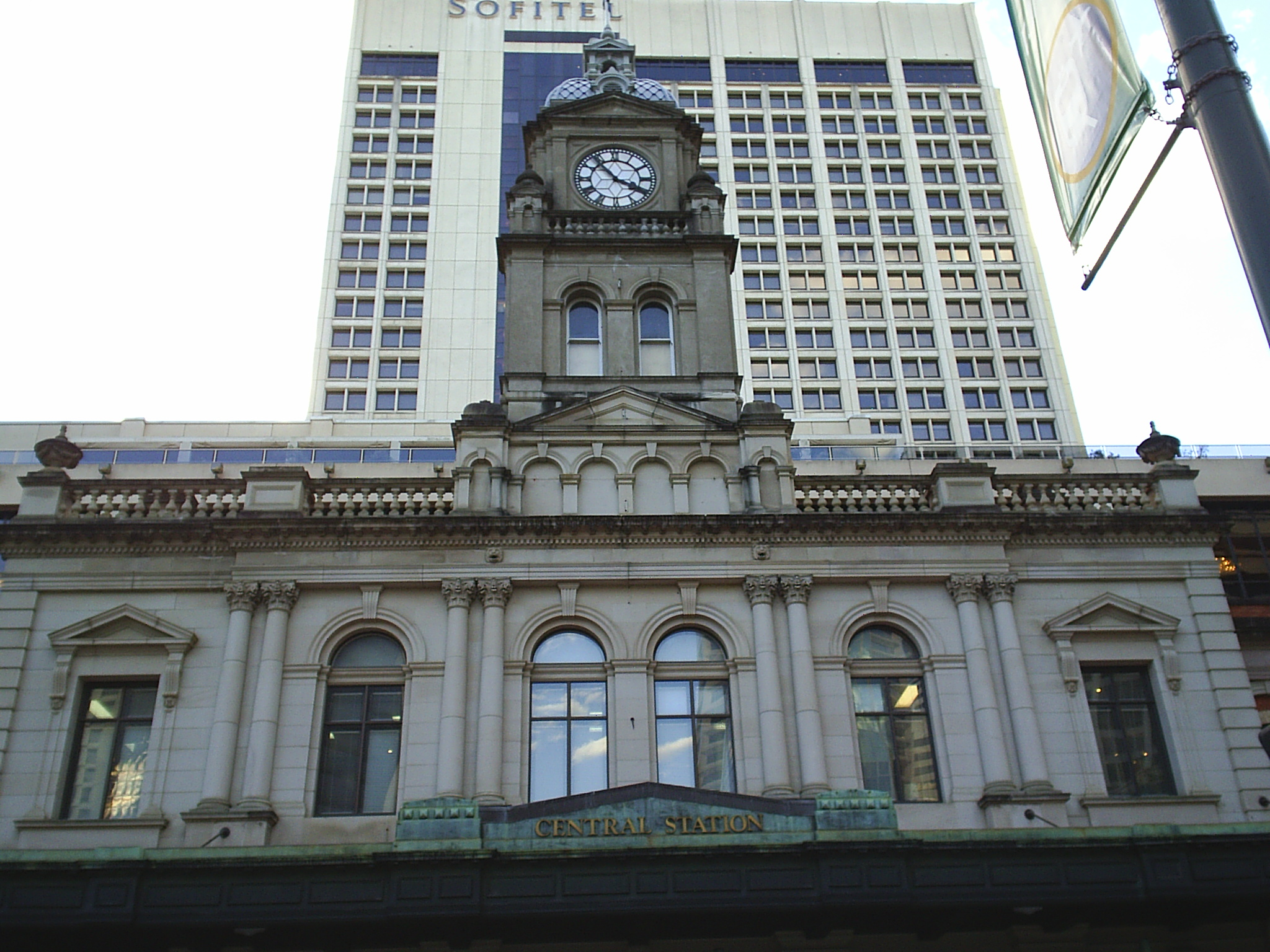
Central Station clock tower, Brisbane

- 1894 – Brisbane Children's Hospital
- 1885 – Brisbane Treasury Building
- 1885 – Townsville Post and Telegraph Office
- 1885 – Townsville Hospital
- 1885 – Charters Towers Courthouse
- 1885 – Mackay Courthouse
- 1885 – Kangaroo Point Immigration Centre (Yungaba Immigration Centre)
- 1895 – Booroodabin Public Baths
- 1901 – Brisbane Central railway station
- 1901 – an unexecuted design for the Townsville railway station
- – Gympie Town Hall (first stage)
- – Warwick Town Hall
- – Maryborough railway station
- – Brisbane Masonic Memorial Temple

=== In New South Wales ===
- 1862 – A unexecuted design for the Sydney Free Public Library
- 1880 – Wagga Wagga Town Hall (unexecuted)
- 1881 – Waverley Town Hall (unexecuted)
- 1881 – Orange Town Hall
- 1899 – A new scheme for the Newcastle Hospital (of which only the Nurses' Quarters and operating Theatre were built)
- 1903 – Maitland Hospital

=== In Western Australia ===
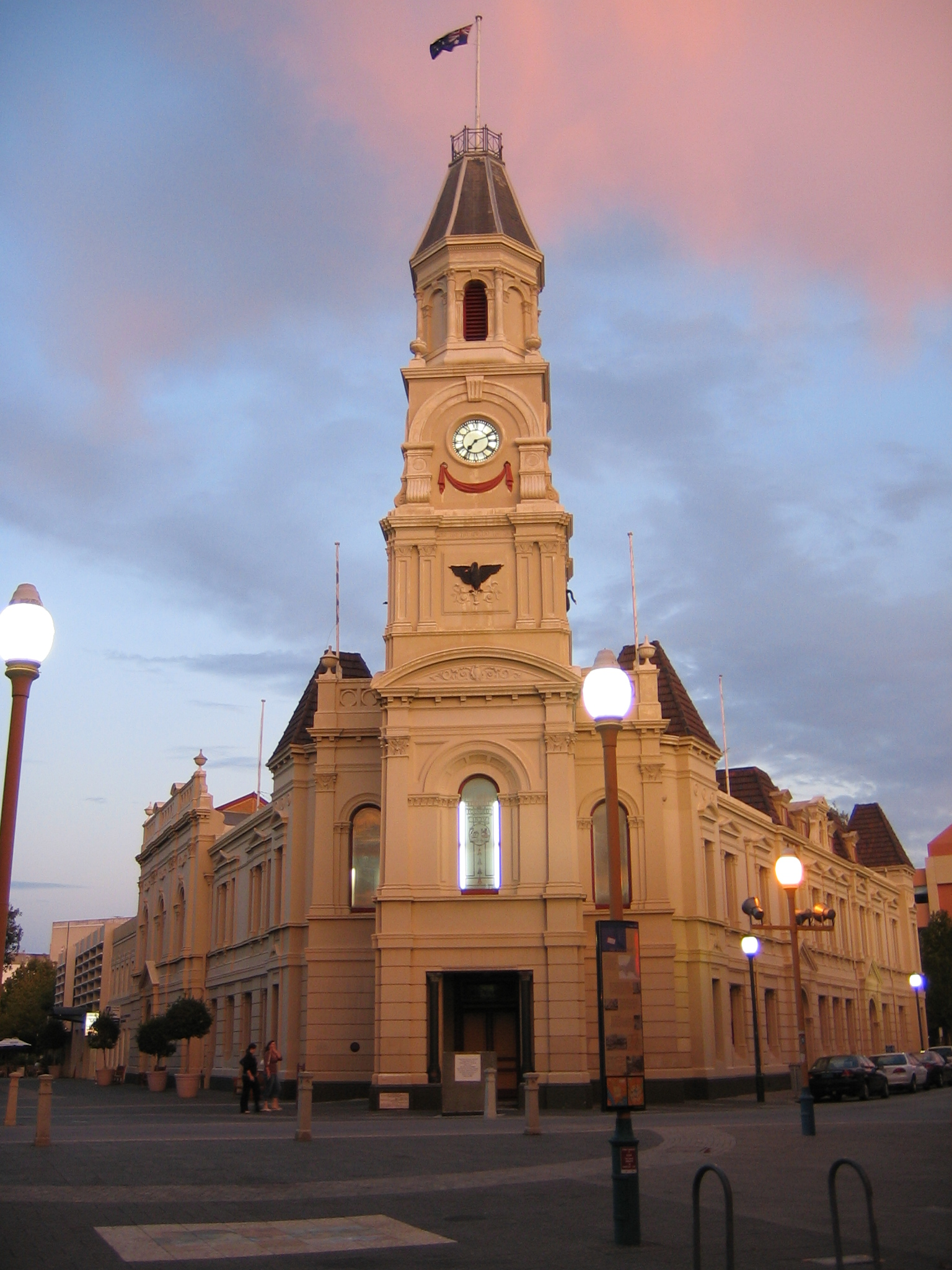
Fremantle Town Hall

- 1897 – Perth St Andrew's Presbyterian Church
- 1897 – Fremantle Town Hall, alterations and extensions
- 1898 – Perth Royal Children's Hospital (unexecuted)
- 1898 – Vasse Butter Factory

=== In New Zealand ===
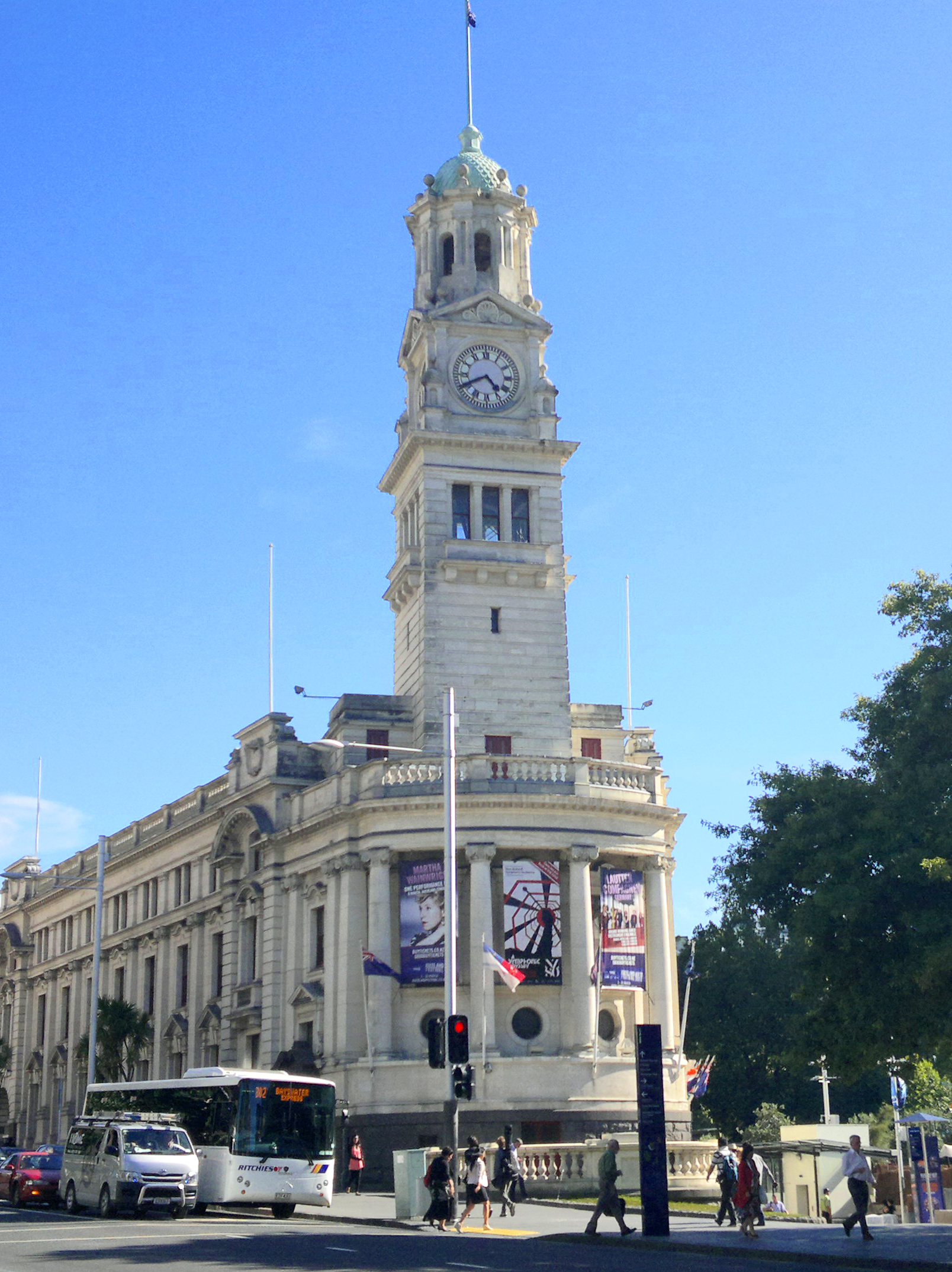
Auckland Town Hall

- 1907 – Auckland Town Hall
- – A design for the Auckland Supreme Court
- – A design for a Christchurch Court House

== Awards ==
Clark placed in 38 of the 47 competitions he entered throughout his career; of these, 24 were first placements.

Clark's obituary stated his partnership with son Edward James Clark, became his most professionally successfully period in respect to competition wins with the firm winning in succession competitions for:

- Fremantle Town Hall Auditorium Alterations (Fremantle, 1897)
- Saint Andrew's Presbyterian Church (Perth, 1897)
- Royal Children's Hospital (Perth, 1898)
- Newcastle Hospital (Newcastle, 1899)
- Maitland Hospital (Maitland, 1903)
- The City Baths (Melbourne, 1903)

Additionally in later years the firm successful campaigned for

- National Mutual Building (Ballarat, 1904)
- Women's Hospital (Melbourne, 1907)
- Carlton Refuge (Melbourne, 1907)
- Auckland Town Hall (Auckland, 1907 )
- Melbourne Hospital (Melbourne, 1912)

His other competition awards were produced from individual work, partnerships and associations with architectural firms.
