= Townsville Post Office =

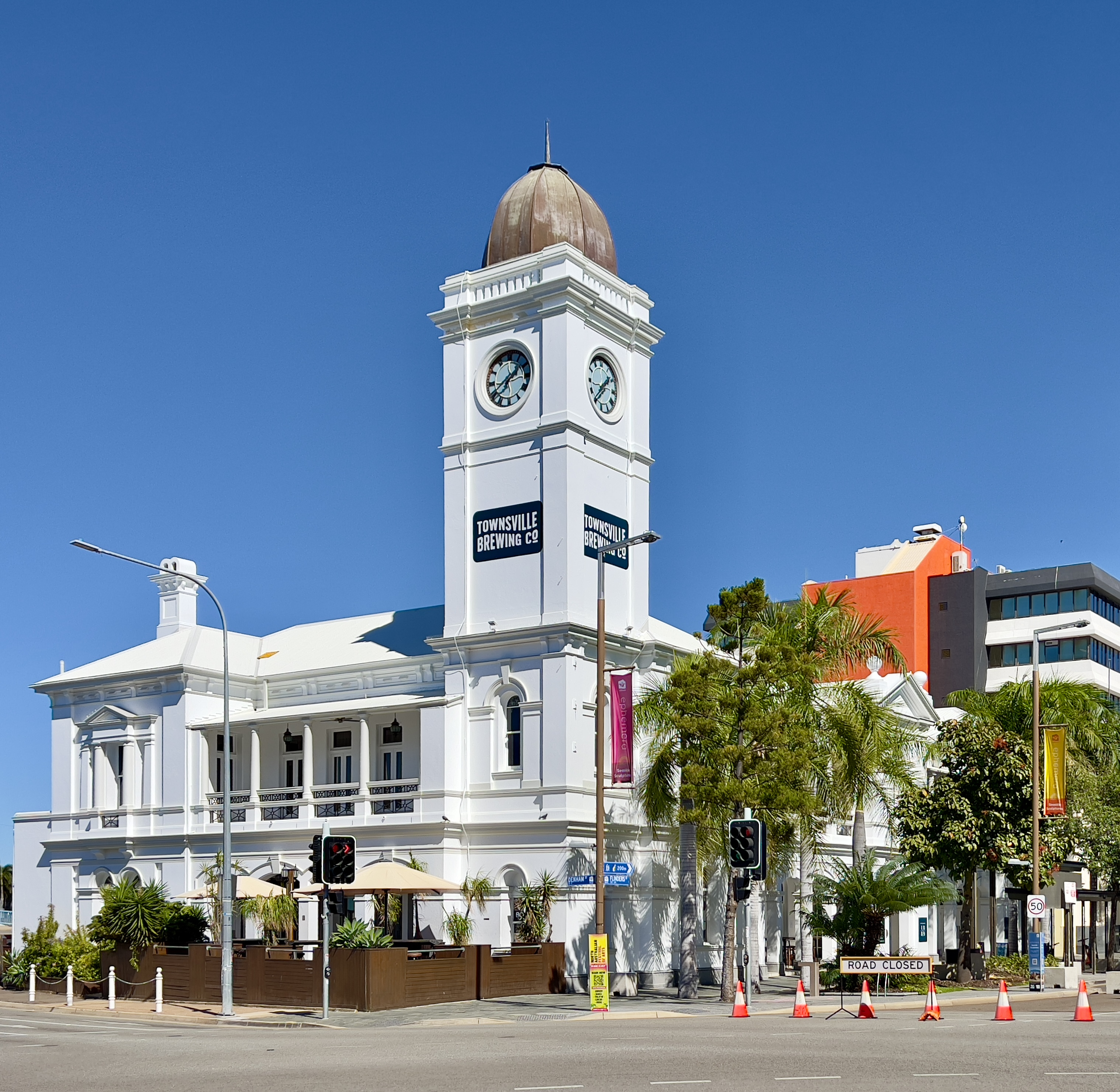
- The Brewery (formerly the Townsville Post Office) with the second clock tower, 2023

- Location within Queensland Location within Australia
- 19.2586°S 146.8183°E
- Location: 252–270 Flinders Street, Townsville CBD, City of Townsville, Queensland, Australia

History
- Design period: 1870s–1890s (late 19th century)
- Built: 1886

Site notes
- Architect: John James Clark
- Architectural style: Italianate

Queensland Heritage Register
- Official name: Townsville Post Office (former)
- Type: state heritage (built)
- Designated: 30 May 2003
- Reference no.: 600911
- Significant period: 1886–1888 (fabric); 1880s–ongoing (historical, social)
- Significant components: tower – clock
- Builders: Dennis Kellcher

Townsville Post Office is a heritage-listed former post office and now brewery at 252–270 Flinders Street, Townsville CBD, City of Townsville, Queensland, Australia. It was designed by John James Clark and built in 1886 by Dennis Kellcher. It was added to the Queensland Heritage Register on 30 May 2003.

== History ==
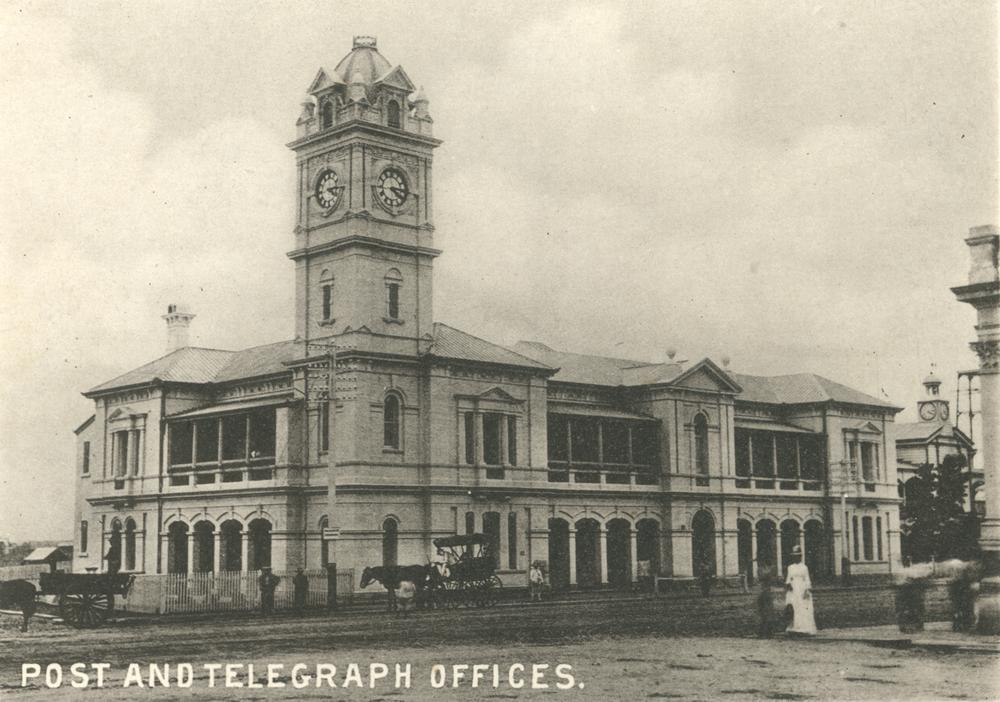
Townsville Post Office with the first clock tower, circa 1900

The Post Office was constructed in a number of stages. The first stage was a two-storey telegraph office at a cost of almost £6000, following an 1886 extension for a post office (ground floor) with a residence for the postmaster on the upper floor) costing over £8000. Dennis Kellcher submitted a tender and carried out extensions in 1888, while a clock tower was built by Henry L Davis & Co. Chimes were imported from England in 1889 and installed by 1891.

Following the bombing of Darwin, the clocktower was dismantled in 1942 and the mechanism was stored away. A greatly modified tower was built in 1963–64 by JE Allen & Co. of Townsville at a cost of £42,135. The interior was also modernised at this time. Because of its prominent location, the Post Office often became the scene of political rallies around a speaker on a soap box.

In 2001, it was redeveloped as The Brewery, owned by the Townsville Brewing Company. The company brews beer on-site and has a restaurant and bar.

== Description ==
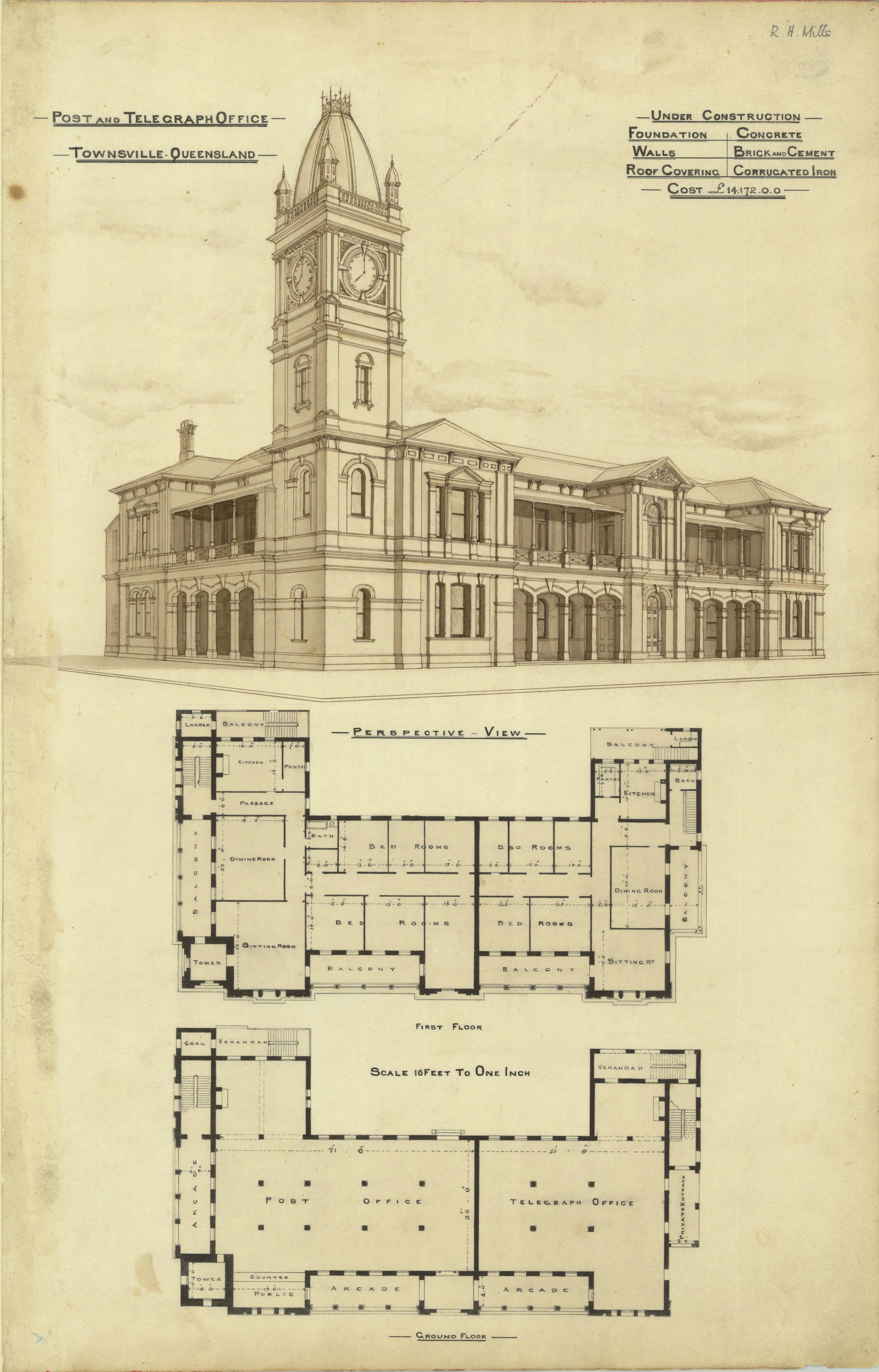
Architectural plans, circa 1888

The Post Office is a cement-rendered brick building, which displays Renaissance features. Its asymmetric facade has a loggia on the lower level, which shades the building along Flinders and Denham Streets and a verandah along the front and side facade of the upper level. The lowpitched hipped roof of corrugated iron extends into four gabled projections, while a slender clocktower and parapeted cupola dominates the corner.

On the upper level, French doors open onto the verandah, with sashed windows in all other openings. The interior is not as intact as the facade because of years of alterations. The building stands in a commanding position in the streetscape at the eastern end of Flinders Mall. It can be seen from across Ross Creek and enhances the western end of historic Flinders Street East. Despite interior modifications, the basic structure is intact and in excellent condition.

== Heritage listing ==
The former Townsville Post Office was listed on the Queensland Heritage Register on 30 May 2003 having satisfied the following criteria.

The place is important in demonstrating the evolution or pattern of Queensland's history.

The Post Office is a most significant building of its type and in its particular location. It is a fine example of a purpose-built colonial government building displaying Renaissance elements.

For over one hundred years it has been a landmark in the streetscape of the town.

The place is important in demonstrating the principal characteristics of a particular class of cultural places.

The Post Office is a most significant building of its type and in its particular location. It is a fine example of a purpose-built colonial government building displaying Renaissance elements.

The place is important because of its aesthetic significance.

For over one hundred years it has been a landmark in the streetscape of the town.
