= Peter Kerr (architect) =

Australian architect (1820–1912)

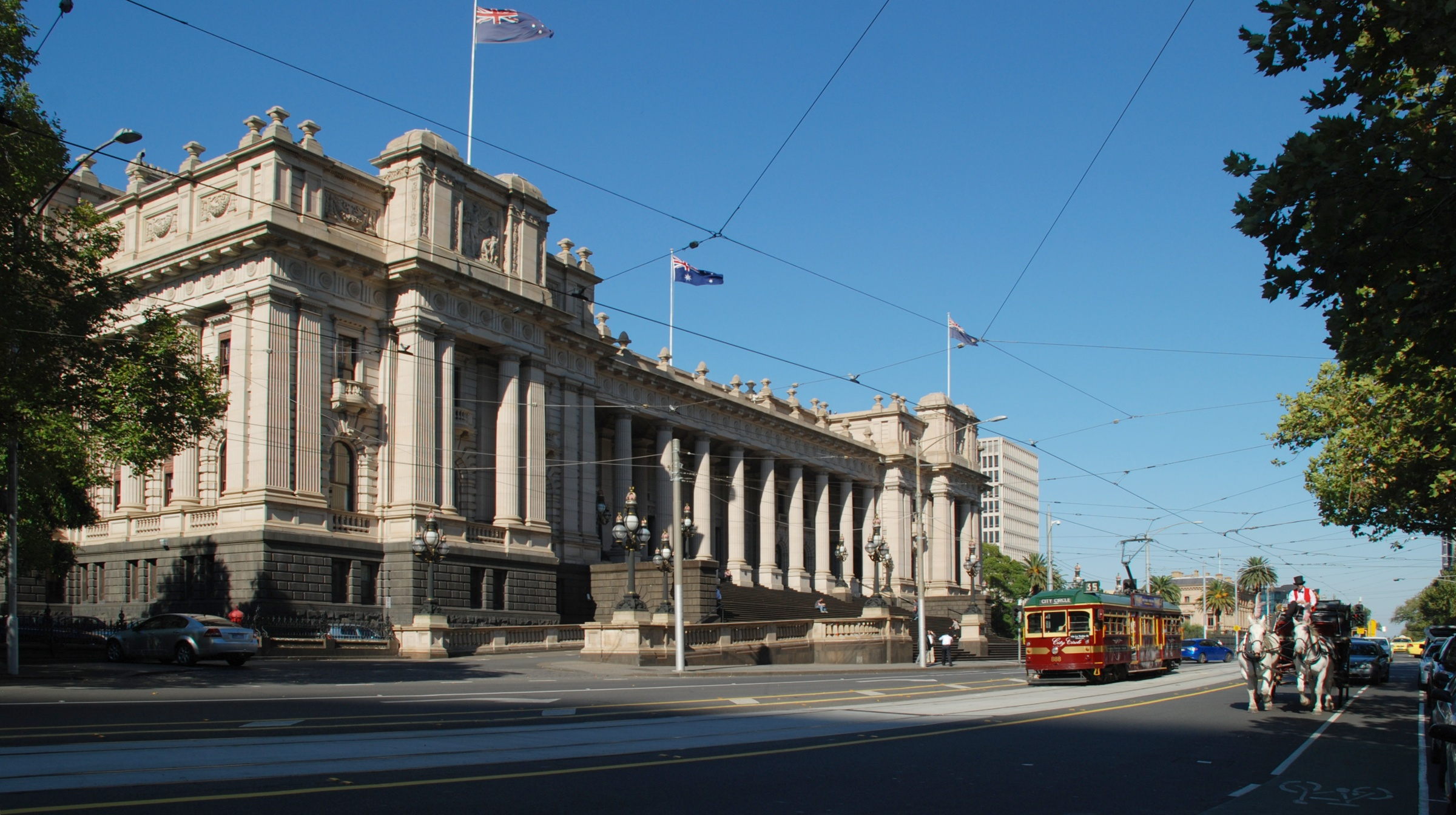
Parliament House, Melbourne

Peter Kerr (21 April 1820 – 31 March 1912) was an Australian architect and the principal designer of the Parliament House of Victoria, Australia, commencing from a government architect's basic design.

Kerr immigrated to Melbourne in 1852 after working under Sir Charles Barry on the design of the Palace of Westminster. Having also associated with Augustus Pugin, he was well versed in the Gothic Revival style in which, over 40 years, he developed one of the city's great buildings.

== See also ==
- Knight & Kerr
