= List of official openings by Elizabeth II in Australia =

During her many visits to Australia, Queen Elizabeth II opened sessions of parliament and unveiled various buildings, venues and other things. They included, but are not limited to:

| Venue | Location | State | Date |
|---|---|---|---|
| Third session of the thirty-seventh Parliament of New South Wales | Sydney | NSW | 4 February 1954 |
| King George V and King George VI Memorial | Hyde Park, Sydney | NSW | 5 February 1954 |
| Remembrance Driveway | Sydney–Canberra | NSW/ACT | 5 February 1954 |
| Third session of the twentieth Parliament of Australia | Canberra | ACT | 15 February 1954 |
| Australian-American Memorial | Canberra | ACT | 16 February 1954 |
| Sesquicentenary Memorial | Hobart | Tas | 20 February 1954 |
| Fifth Session of the thirtieth Parliament of Tasmania | Hobart | Tas | 22 February 1954 |
| Second session of the thirty-ninth Parliament of Victoria | Melbourne | Vic | 25 February 1954 |
| Additions to the Shrine of Remembrance | Melbourne | Vic | 28 February 1954 |
| Second session of the thirty-fourth Parliament of South Australia | Adelaide | SA | 23 March 1954 |
| Royal Children's Hospital | Melbourne | Vic | 25 February 1963 |
| University of New South Wales, Wallace Wurth School of Medicine and the School of Biological Sciences | Sydney | NSW | 4 March 1963 |
| Australian National University, R.G. Menzies Building | Canberra | ACT | 13 March 1963 |
| Council House | Perth | WA | 25 March 1963 |
| The University of Western Australia Golden Jubilee Celebrations | Perth | WA | 25 March 1963 |
| Royal Hobart Hospital North East Building | Hobart | Tas | 3 April 1970 |
| Captain James Cook Memorial on Lake Burley Griffin | Canberra | ACT | 25 April 1970 |
| National Carillon | Canberra | ACT | 26 April 1970 |
| Sydney Opera House | Sydney | NSW | 20 October 1973 |
| Second session of the twenty-eighth Parliament of Australia | Canberra | ACT | 28 February 1974 |
| Second session of the thirtieth Parliament of Australia | Canberra | ACT | 8 March 1977 |
| Queen Elizabeth II Jubilee Sports Centre | Brisbane | Qld | 10 March 1977 |
| Peel-Cunningham County Council Building | Tamworth | NSW | 11 March 1977 |
| High Court of Australia | Canberra | ACT | 26 May 1980 |
| HMAS Coonawarra | Darwin | NT | 6 October 1982 |
| 1982 Commonwealth Games Closing Ceremony | Brisbane | Qld | 9 October 1982 |
| Mount Druitt Hospital | Sydney | NSW | 11 October 1982 |
| National Gallery of Australia | Canberra | ACT | 12 October 1982 |
| Parramatta Stadium | Sydney | NSW | 5 March 1986 |
| Carrick Hill | Springfield | SA | 9 March 1986 |
| Australian Stockman's Hall of Fame | Longreach | Qld | 29 April 1988 |
| World Expo 88 | Brisbane | Qld | 30 April 1988 |
| Darling Harbour | Sydney | NSW | 4 May 1988 |
| Parliament House, Canberra | Canberra | ACT | 9 May 1988 |
| State Library of New South Wales annexe | Sydney | NSW | May 1988 |
| Second session of the fiftieth Parliament of New South Wales | Sydney | NSW | 20 February 1992 |
| Bonython Primary School | Canberra | ACT | 24 February 1992 |
| Commonwealth Heads of Government Meeting 2002 | Coolum | Qld | 2 March 2002 |
| 2006 Commonwealth Games | Melbourne | Vic | 15 March 2006 |
| Rain Bank, Rainforest Green, South Bank Parklands | Brisbane | Qld | 24 October 2011 |
| The New Royal Children's Hospital | Melbourne | Vic | 26 October 2011 |
| Commonwealth Heads of Government Meeting 2011 | Perth | WA | 28 October 2011 |

== Photo gallery ==
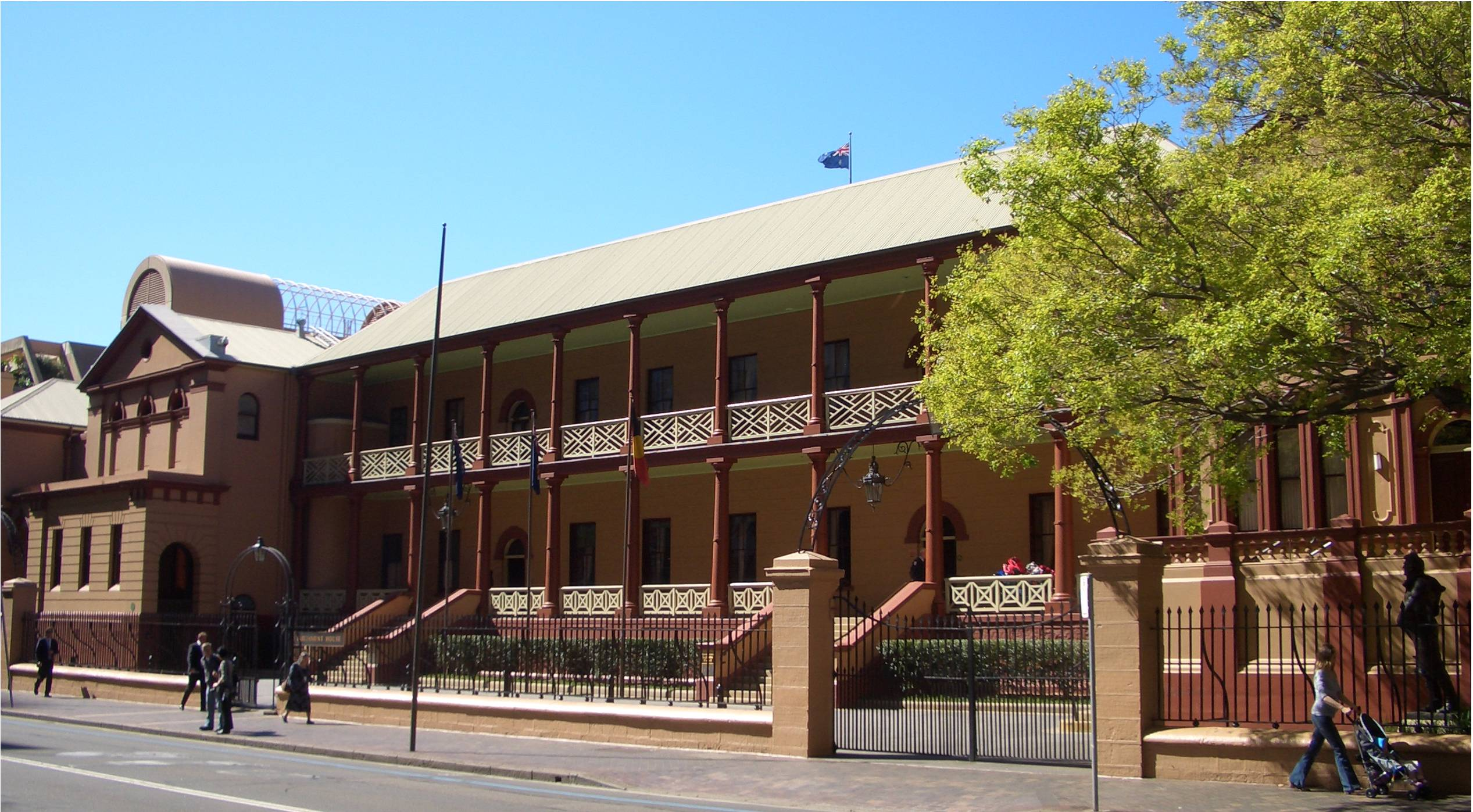
1954, 1992 - Parliament of New South Wales.

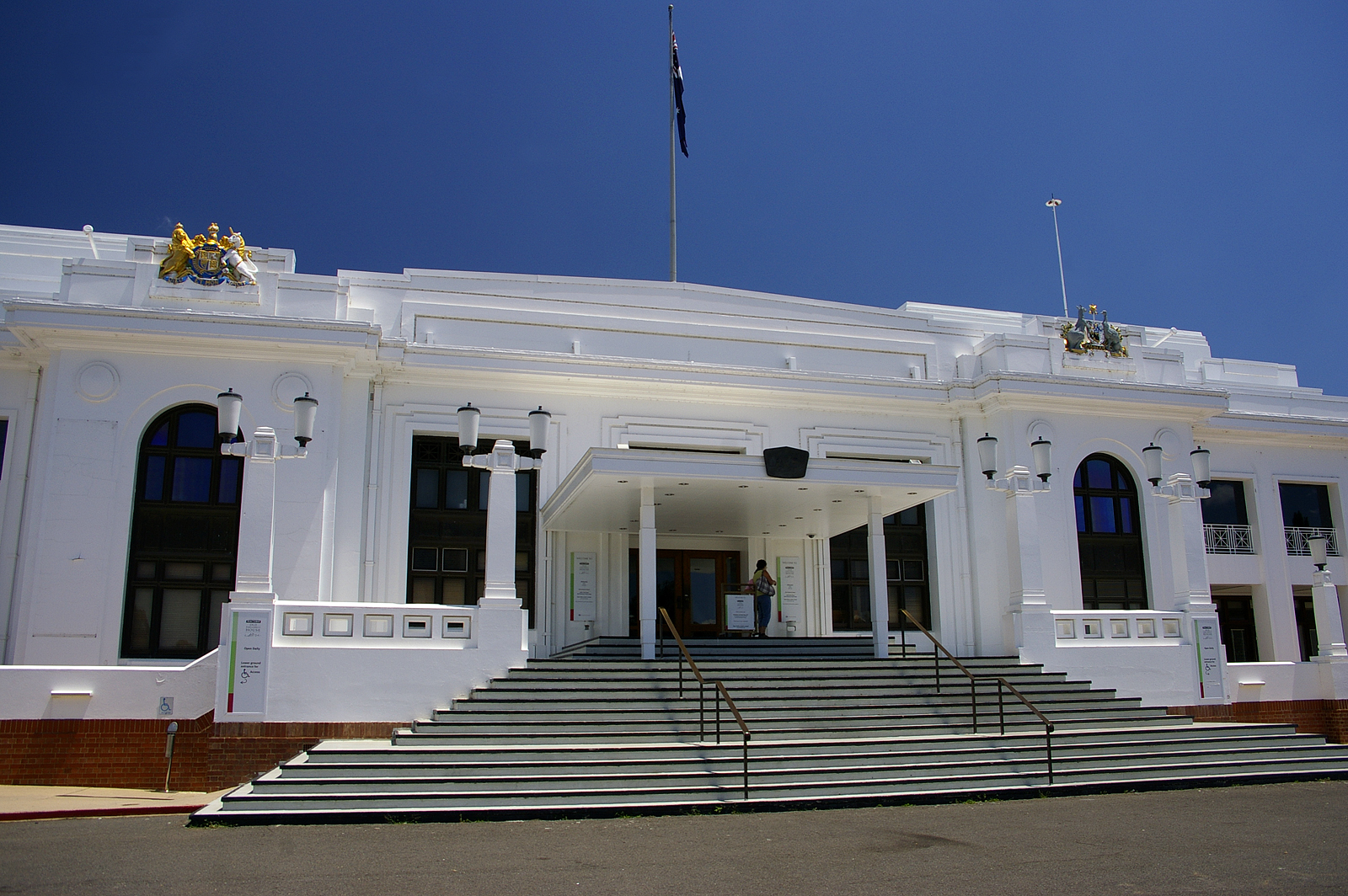
1954, 1974 - Parliament of Australia.

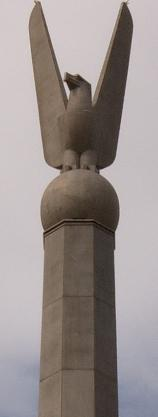
1954 - Australian-American Memorial.

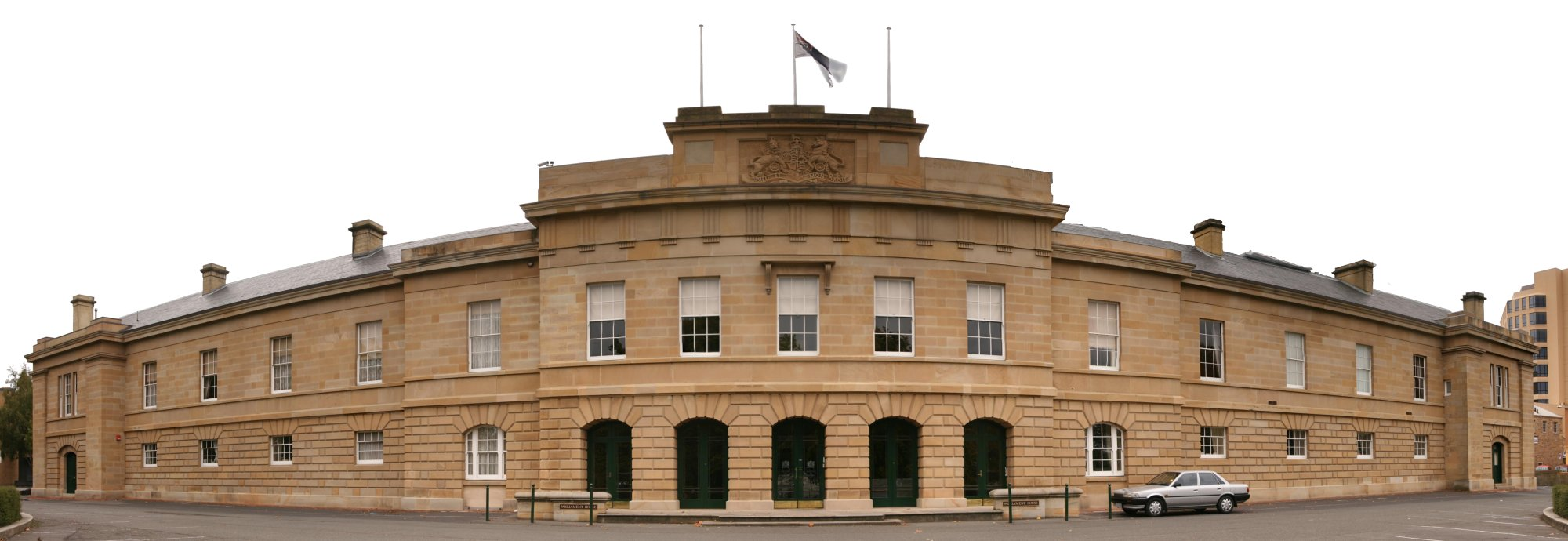
1954 - Parliament of Tasmania.

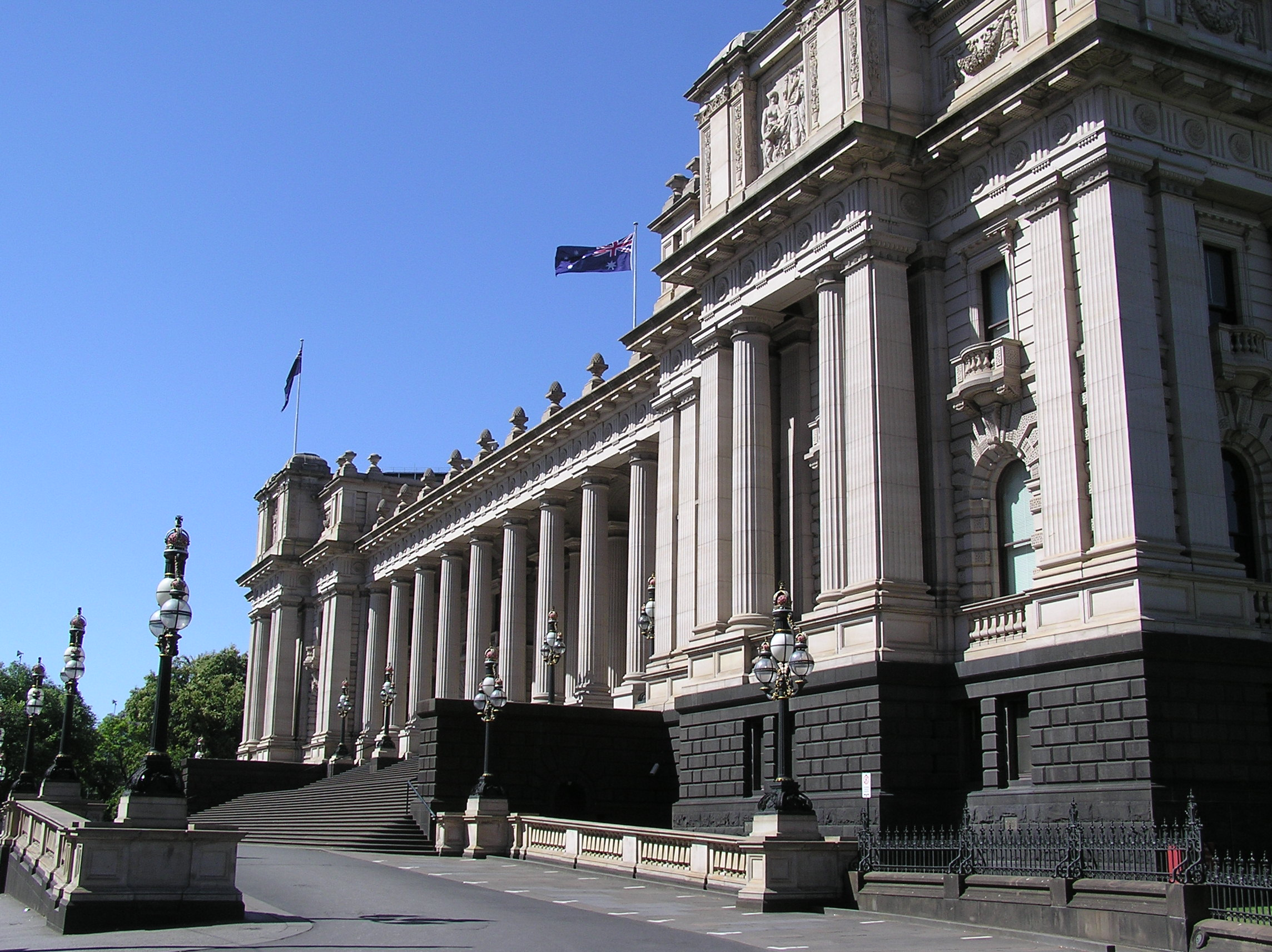
1954 - Parliament of Victoria.

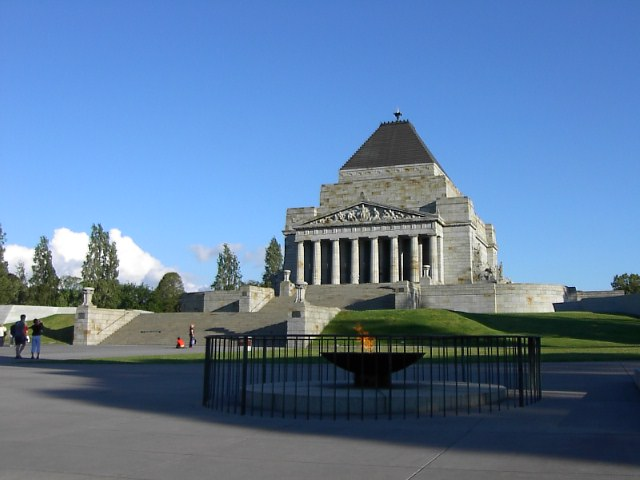
1954 - Additions to the Shrine of Remembrance.

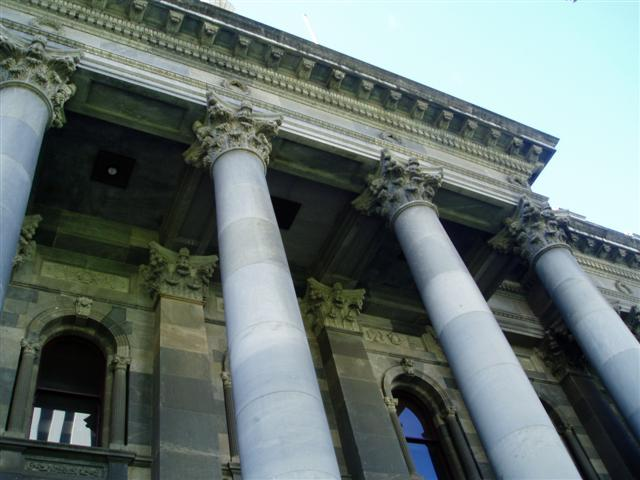
1954 - Parliament of South Australia.

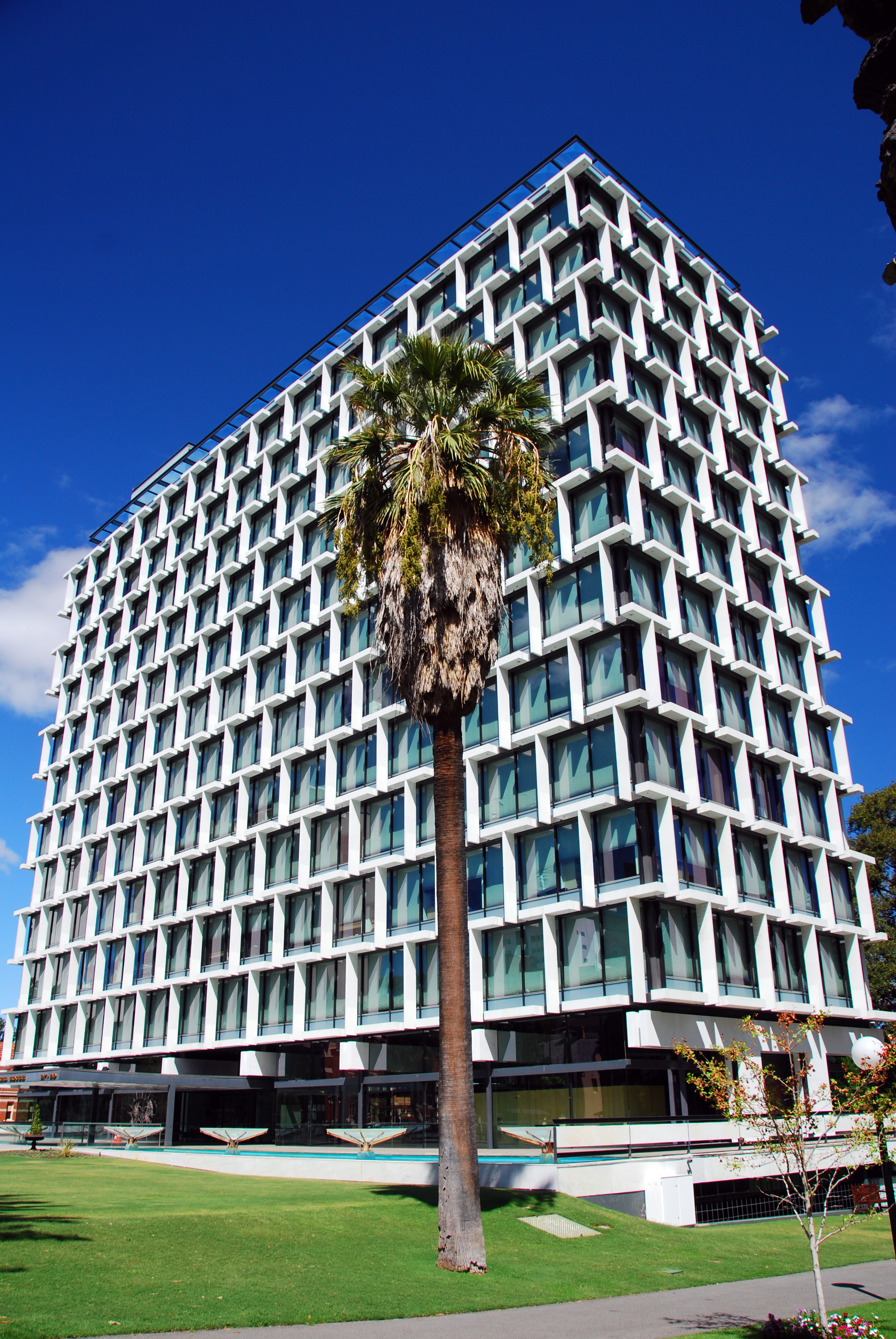
1963 - Council House, Perth.

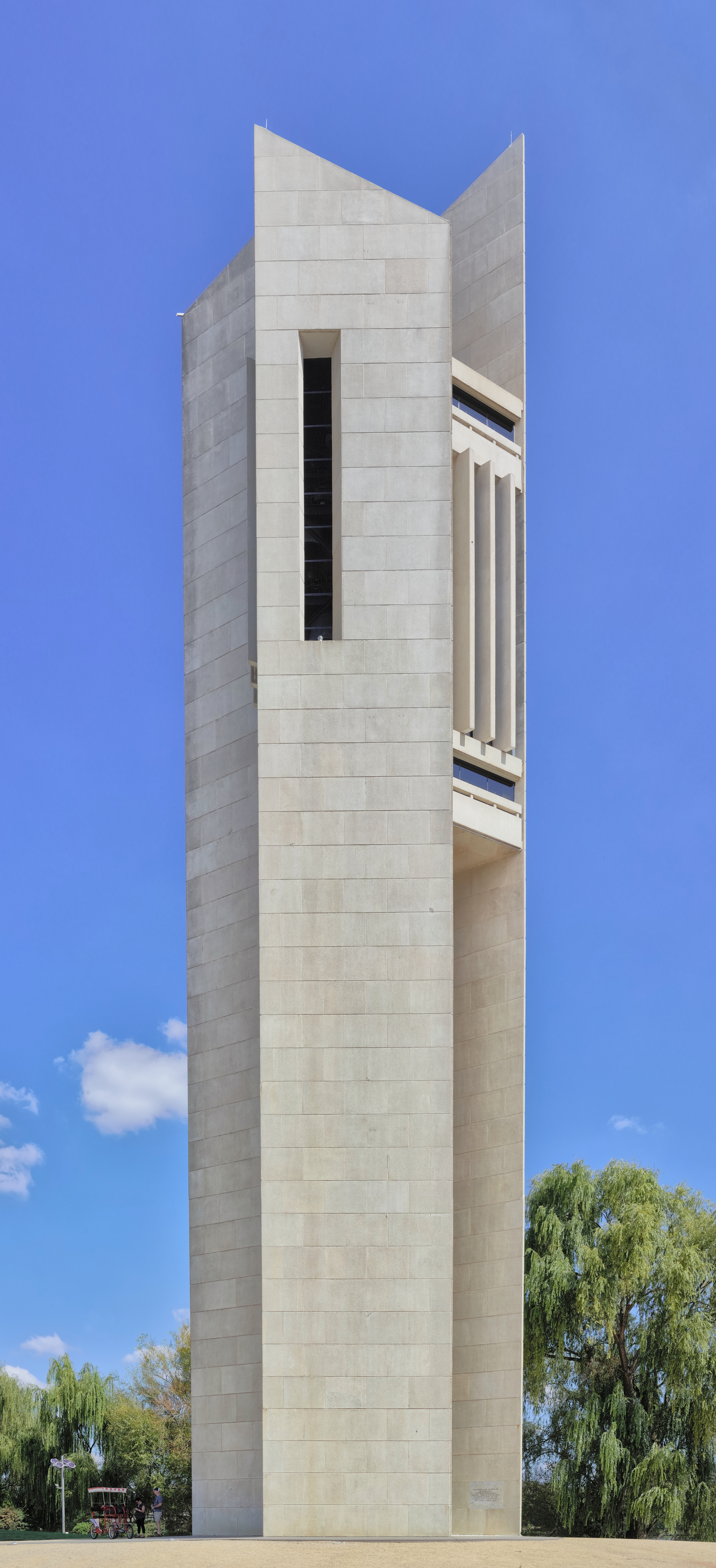
1970 - National Carillon.

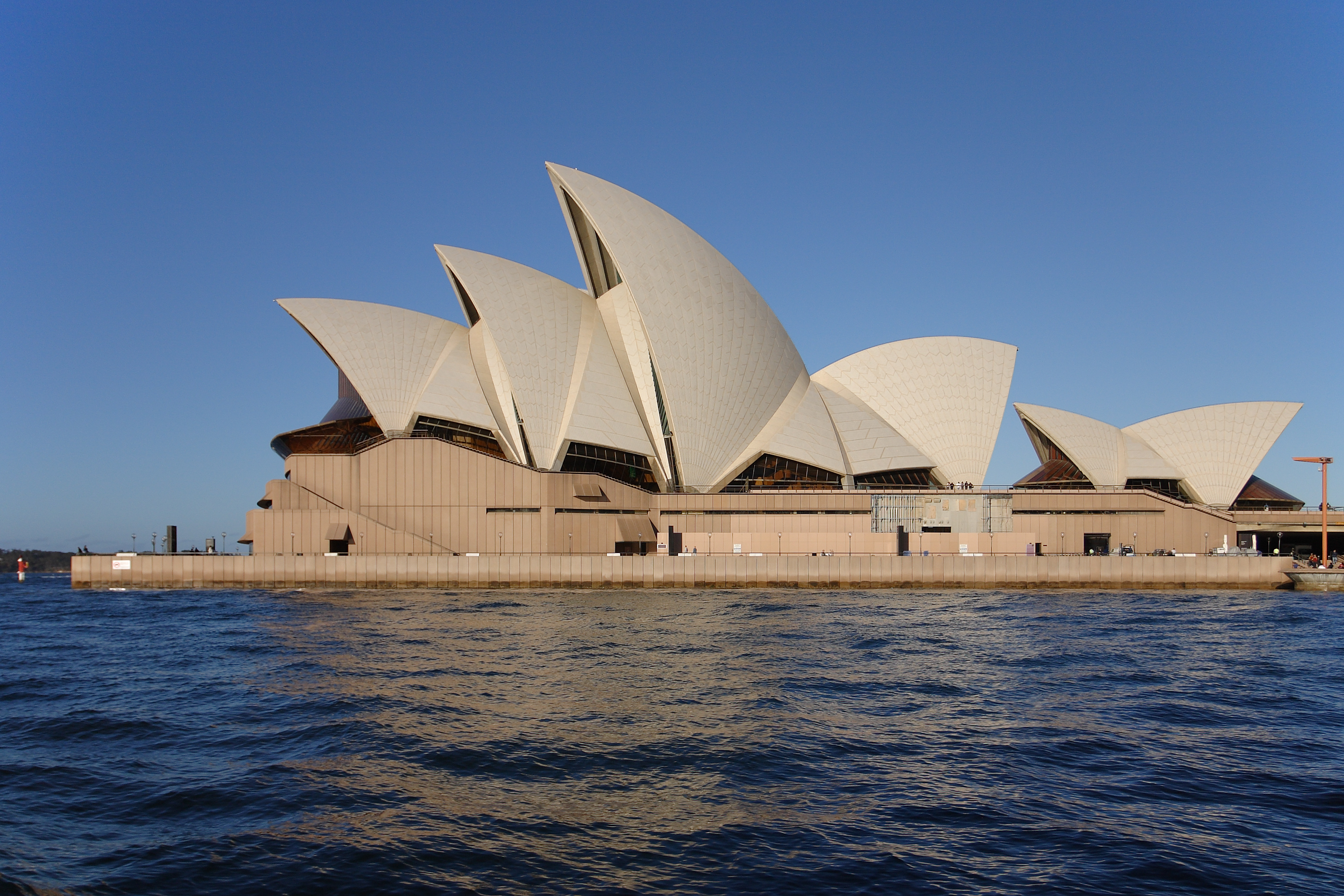
1973 - Sydney Opera House.

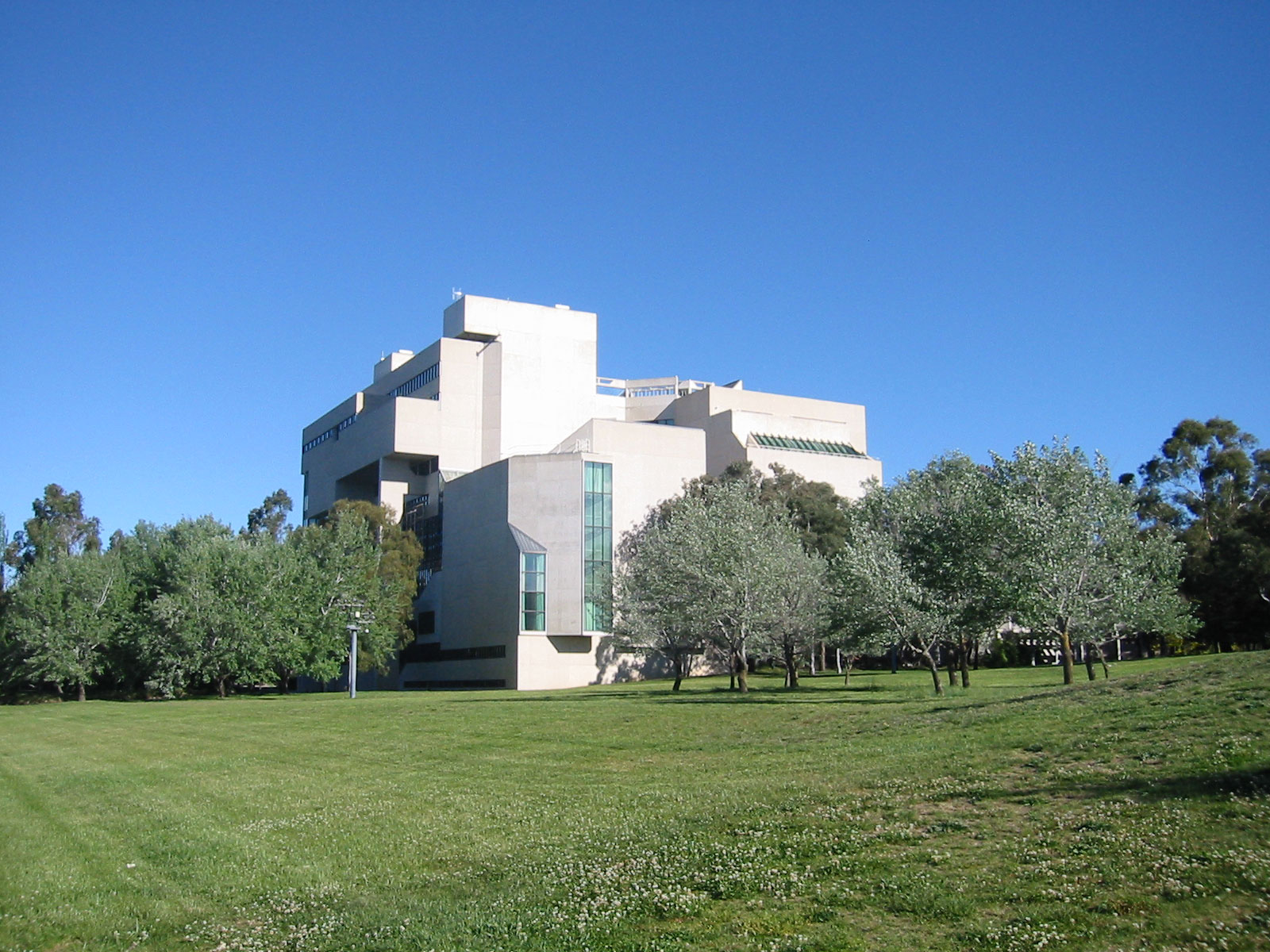
1980 - High Court of Australia.

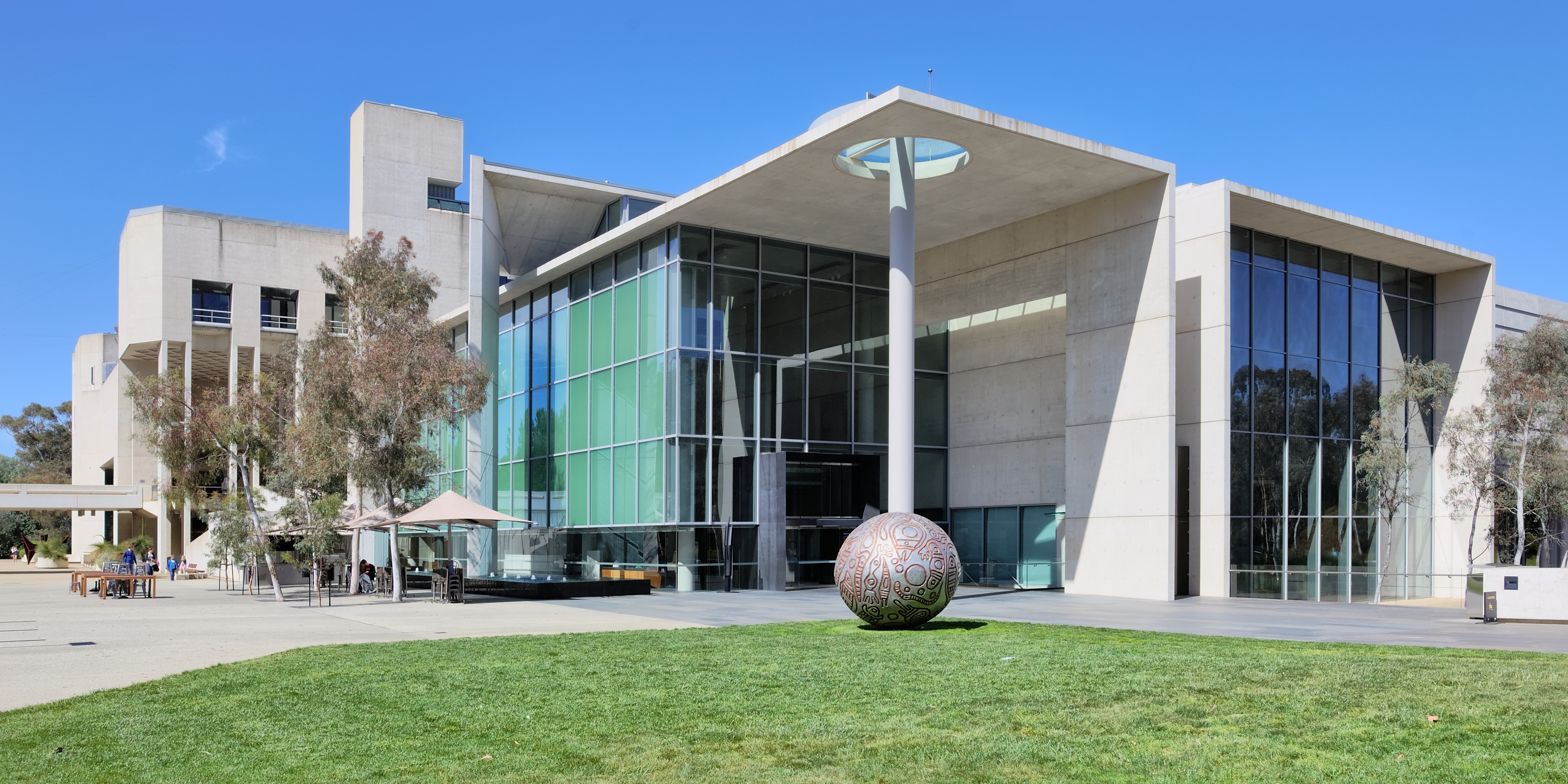
1982 - National Gallery of Australia.

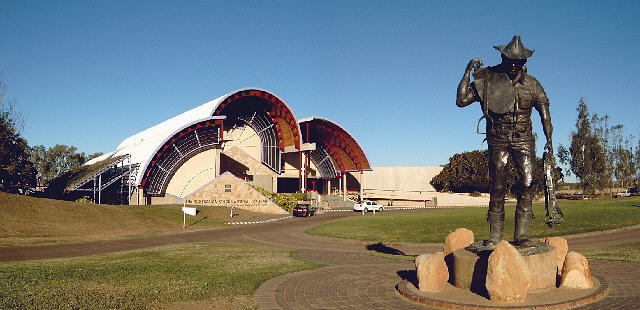
1988 - Australian Stockman's Hall of Fame.

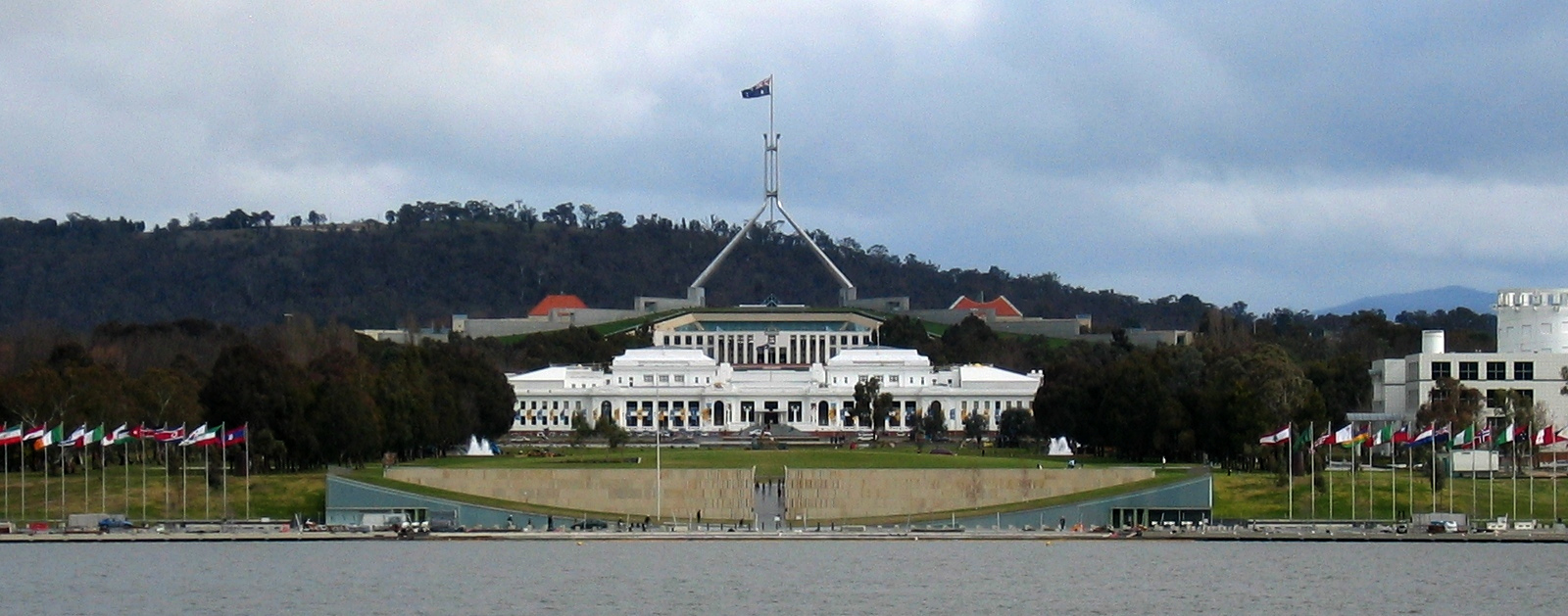
1988 - Parliament House, Canberra.

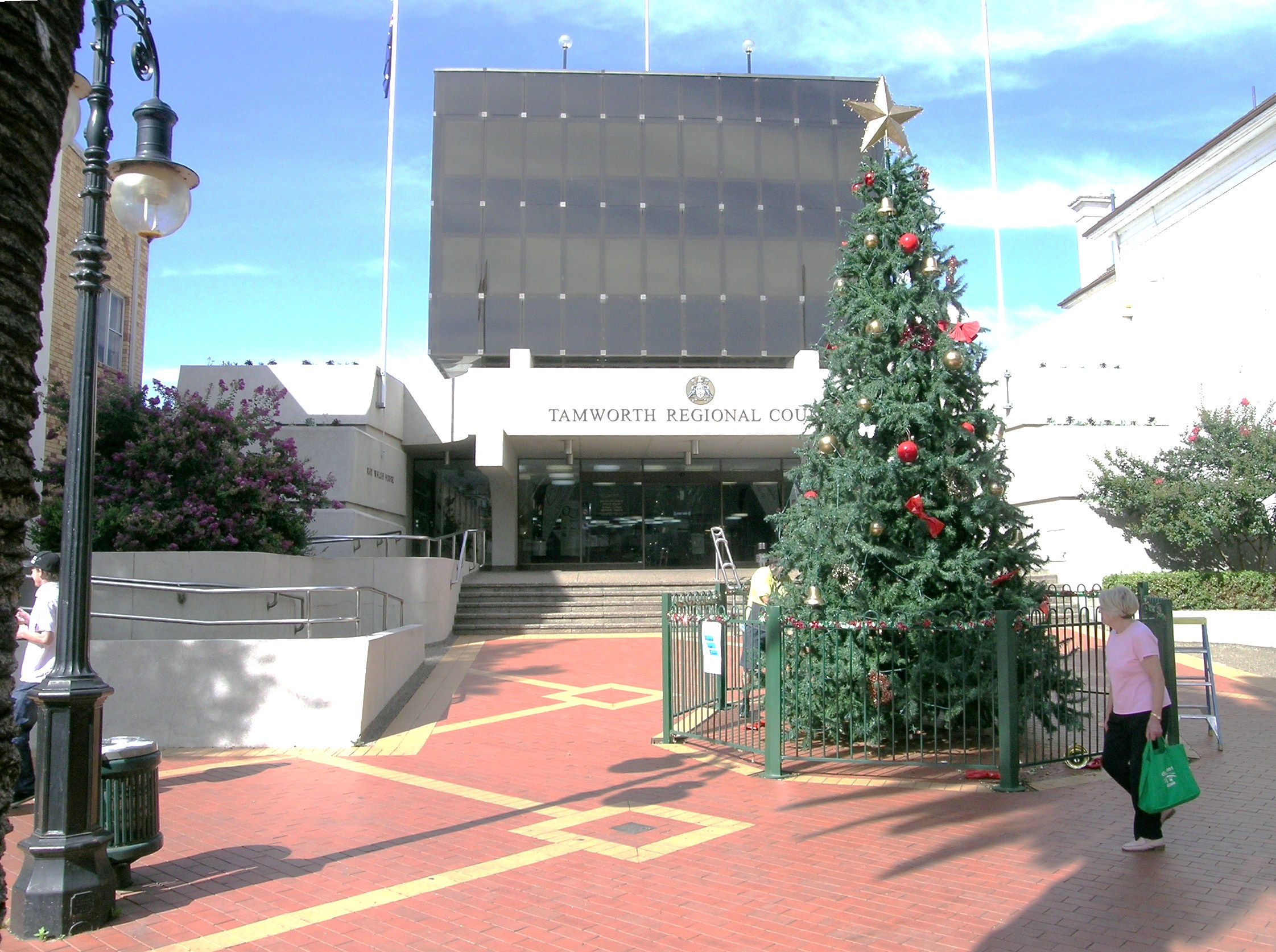
2008 - Ray Walsh House, Tamworth.

== See also ==
- Royal visits to Australia
