= Anthony D. Holmes =

Australian plastic and reconstructive surgeon

Anthony David Holmes
- Education: Melbourne University; Harvard Medical School
- Occupations: plastic and maxillofacial surgeon
- Known for: Developing surgical methods for paediatric facial reconstruction
- Medical career
- Institutions: Royal Children's Hospital, Melbourne; Jigsaw Foundation
- Awards: Officer of the Order of Australia 2018

Anthony David Holmes AO (b. 1945) is a plastic and reconstructive surgeon. His most high-profile surgery was in 2009 when he worked with a large team of experts to separate the Bangladeshi conjoined twins Trishna and Krishna.

== Career ==
In 1969, Holmes graduated from Melbourne University MBBS. He followed this with General Surgery training from 1970 to 1974, then Plastic Surgery training from 1975 to 1978 at Royal Melbourne Hospital. He was certified as a Fellow in Plastic Surgery, Harvard Medical School in 1978 and as a Diplomate of the American Board of Plastic Surgery in 1982.

=== Craniofacial speciality ===
Since 1978 Holmes has been consultant plastic surgeon at Royal Children's Hospital, Melbourne where he set up the Melbourne Craniofacial Unit in 1979.

In 2004, the RCH awarded Holmes the RCH's Elizabeth Turner medal, awarded to senior practitioners who show sustained excellence in clinical care over time.

Holmes has trained over thirty craniofacial fellows, the majority of whom have become heads of departments in Australia and overseas.

=== Academic positions ===
Since 1981 Holmes has been Associate, Department of Paediatrics at the University of Melbourne. He was awarded the McIndoe Lectureship of the British Association of Plastic, Reconstructive and Aesthetic Surgeons, London in 2010. He was the inaugural Harvard Plastic Surgery Resident's Visiting Professor in 2012. He has 57 articles listed in PubMed.

== Significant cases ==
=== Trishna and Krishna: Conjoined twins ===
Holmes was part of a large team, including neurosurgeon Wirginia Maixner, involved in the 27 hour surgery to separate the Bangladeshi conjoined twins, Trishna and Krishna who were joined at the skull. Although they were given only a 25 per cent chance of both surviving the separation surgery without brain damage, in 2010 at 7 years old, they were "not only surviving but thriving."

=== Eman Tabaza: Tumour Removal ===
Eman Tabaza first came to Australia from Gaza in 2004 when she was eight. Holmes led an eight-hour operation at the Royal Children's Hospital which removed the tumour and rebuilt Eman's face. She returned to Melbourne at 16 for further facial surgery and Tony Penington also performed spinal surgery related to the same birth defect.

=== Ronald Aguliar and Asi: Encephalocele ===
ROMAC also brought Asi from Papua New Guinea so that Holmes and Neurosurgeon Patrick Lo were able to correct a rare cranio-facial abnormality called an encephalocele. Operation Rainbow and the Australian Filipino Guidance Association raised funds for eight year old Ronald Aguliar to travel to Australia so that surgeons including Holmes could rebuild his severely deformed face. He was able to return home.
