= Bines =

Bines is a surname. Notable people with the surname include:

- Julie Bines, Australian paediatric gastroenterologist
- Thomas Bines (died 1826), American politician
