= Ethel Mary Vaughan Cowan =

Australian medical doctor (1868 – 1943)

Ethel Mary Vaughan Eaves (née Cowan; born 1868 – died 1943) was an Australian medical doctor who in 1898 was the first female doctor at the Royal Children's Hospital.

Cowan was described in a 20 November 1897 article in the Kyneton Observer as a "native of Ballarat"

After training and working as a nurse in Ballarat, Cowan graduated from the University of Melbourne with a Bachelor of Medicine degree in 1897. Prior to her appointment as resident at the Royal Children's Hospital in 1898, Cowan was obliged to work for one month without pay to prove her competency. Returning from a visit to England in 1902, she replaced Mary Fletcher in an honorary appointment at the Queen Victoria Hospital.

On 18 August 1904, Cowan married Stanley Eaves.

In 2024, after a 2023 proposal by the Melbourne City Council, a lane in Carlton, near to the Children's Hospital former location was named in honour of Cowan.
