= Melbourne Mint =

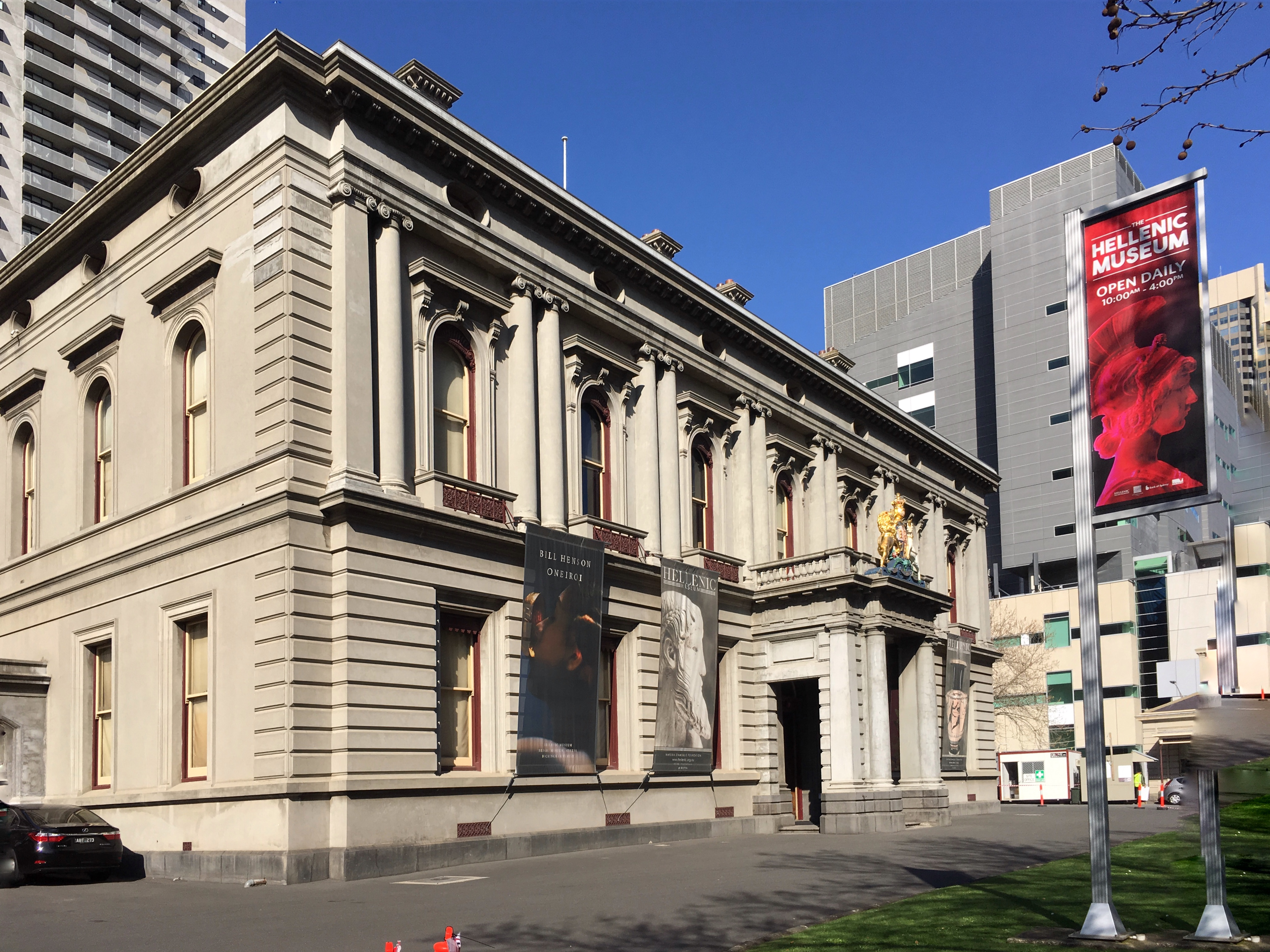

- Location within Melbourne
- Interactive map of the Melbourne Mint area

General information
- Type: Mint office; government building
- Architectural style: Classical Renaissance Revival
- Location: Melbourne, Victoria, Australia
- Coordinates: 37°48′44″S 144°57′24″E
- Opened: 1872

Design and construction
- Architect: John James Clark

Victorian Heritage Register
- Official name: Former Royal Mint
- Type: Registered place
- Designated: 12 October 1988
- Reference no.: H0770
- Heritage overlay no.: HO758
- Categories: Finance; Government and Administration

Register of the National Estate
- Official name: Former Royal Mint
- Type: Defunct register
- Designated: undated
- Reference no.: 5149

The Melbourne Mint, located on the corner of William and La Trobe Streets in Melbourne, Victoria, Australia, was first established as a branch of the British Royal Mint, opening on 12 June 1872. The site operated as the Royal Melbourne Mint until 1968 and was subsequently repurposed as a history museum.

The former mint was added to the Victorian Heritage Register on 12 October 1988 in recognition of its historical and architectural significance; and was, on an unknown date, added to the now defunct Register of the National Estate.

== Building description ==
The main building houses the administration offices, as well as the living quarters for the Deputy Master, his family and domestic servants in the right hand section. There is a pair of guard houses, one by each gate, and the assay and smelting works were in a range of buildings behind.

The former Royal Mint is and is of architectural significance as one of the finest 19th century government buildings in Australia, in a restrained Renaissance revival style. It was designed by Public Works Department architect J. J. Clark, best known for the equally significant Old Treasury Building, Melbourne. The facade design has been said to be based on Renaissance Palazzi, such as the paired piaster arrangement of the Palazzo Vidoni-Caffarelli, Rome (1515) attributed to Raphael, or the paired Ionic columns of the Palazzo Corner della Ca' Grande, Venice, by Sansovino (1545).

The colourful coat of arms placed on the front gates in mid-twentieth century were by the Melbourne woodcarver Walter Langcake. The original design, based on Queen Victoria's coat of arms, is adapted especially for a British Royal Mint branch office in colonial Victoria. The supporting animals are not crowned and a maned horse replaces the usual unicorn.

== Operation as a mint ==
It minted gold sovereigns from 1872 until 1931, and half-sovereigns (intermittently) from 1873 until 1915. In 1916 it commenced minting Commonwealth silver threepences, sixpences, shillings and florins. From 1923 it minted all pre-decimal denominations. It minted rarities such as the 1921/22 overdate threepence, 1923 half-penny and 1930 penny, as well as Australia's four commemorative florins in 1927 (Canberra), 1934/35 (Melbourne Centenary), 1951 (Federation Jubilee) and 1954 (Royal Visit). It assisted the Royal Australian Mint in Canberra in producing one cent coins from 1966 to 1968 and two cent coins in 1966. From 1969 all coin production moved to the Royal Australian Mint in Canberra, and the building housing the coin minting equipment was demolished shortly afterwards. The remaining administrative building became the home of the Royal Historical Society of Victoria, as well as the civil marriage registry, with many weddings in the large ground floor room. Since 1998 it has been vested in a self funded-government body that manages a number of former government buildings, and it has hosted a range of tenants.

From 2007 the former Mint became the home for the Hellenic Museum, showcasing Greek art, history and culture.

From October 2012 private company, Melbourne Mint Pty Ltd, was situated on the ground level and level one of the Melbourne Mint building. Melbourne Mint Pty Ltd belongs to a group of Australian precious metals companies which include Australian Bullion Company (ABC), Gold Merchants International (GMI) and Melbourne Mint Coins. It has no historical relationship to the original Royal Mint.

== Gallery ==
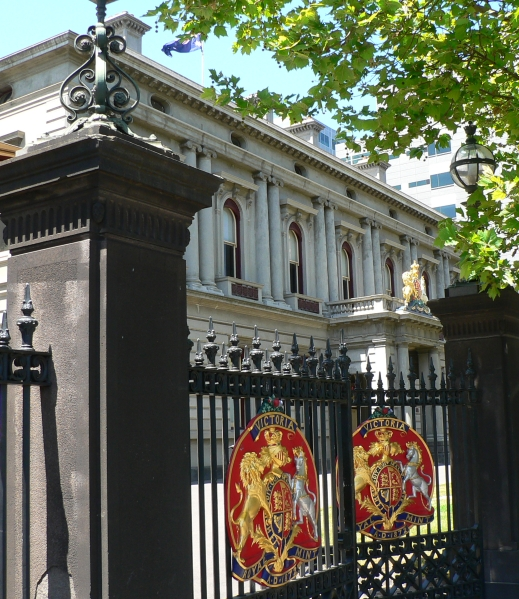
Ornate gates, featuring coat of arms by Walter Langcake

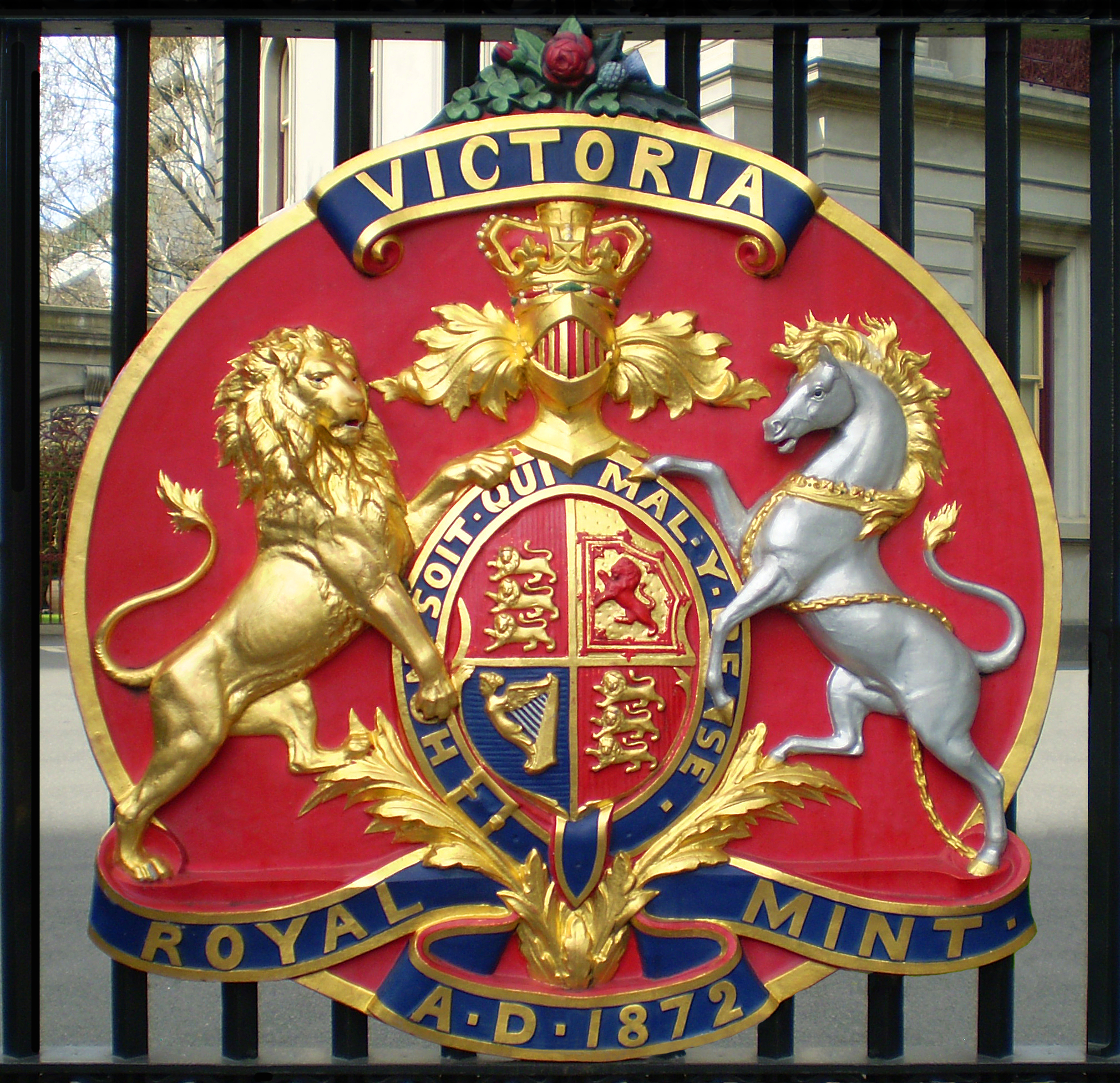
Detail of coat of arms

== See also ==
- List of mints
- Architecture of Melbourne
