= Walter Langcake =

Australian woodcarver and sculptor

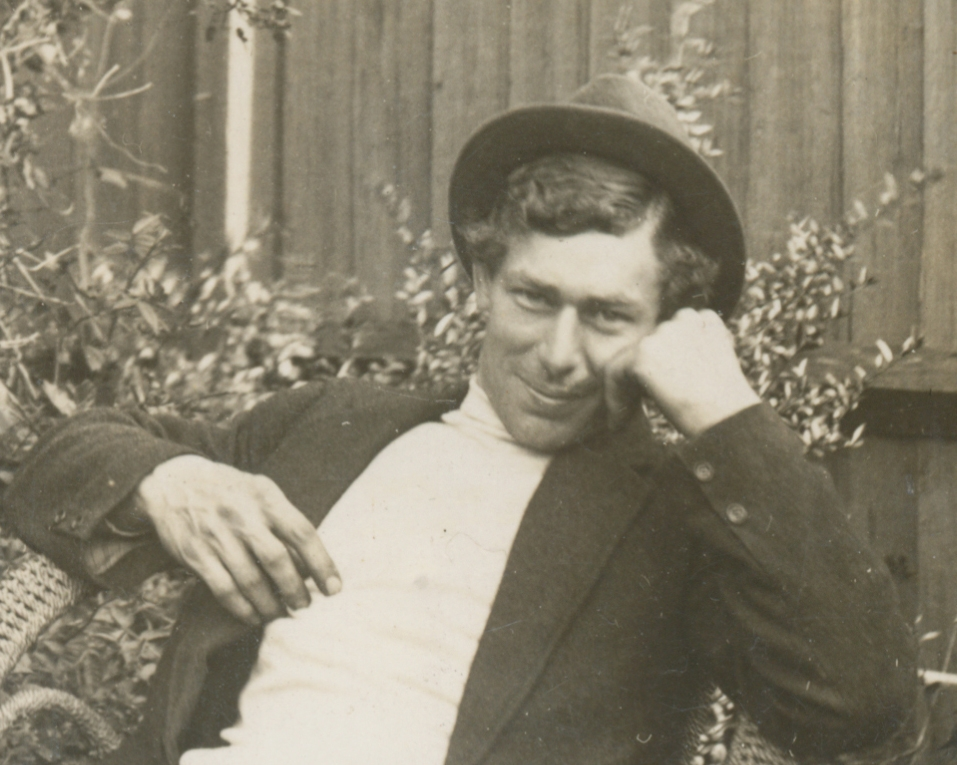
- Walter Langcake in the 1920s
- Born: Walter Langcake; 21 February 1889; Warragul, Victoria, Australia
- Died: 6 June 1967 (aged 78); Frankston, Victoria, Australia
- Known for: Sculpture; decorative arts
- Movement: Arts and crafts

Walter Langcake (21 February 1889, Warragul, Victoria – 6 June 1967, Frankston, Victoria) was an Australian woodcarver and sculptor, who specialised in ecclesiastical decorative arts.

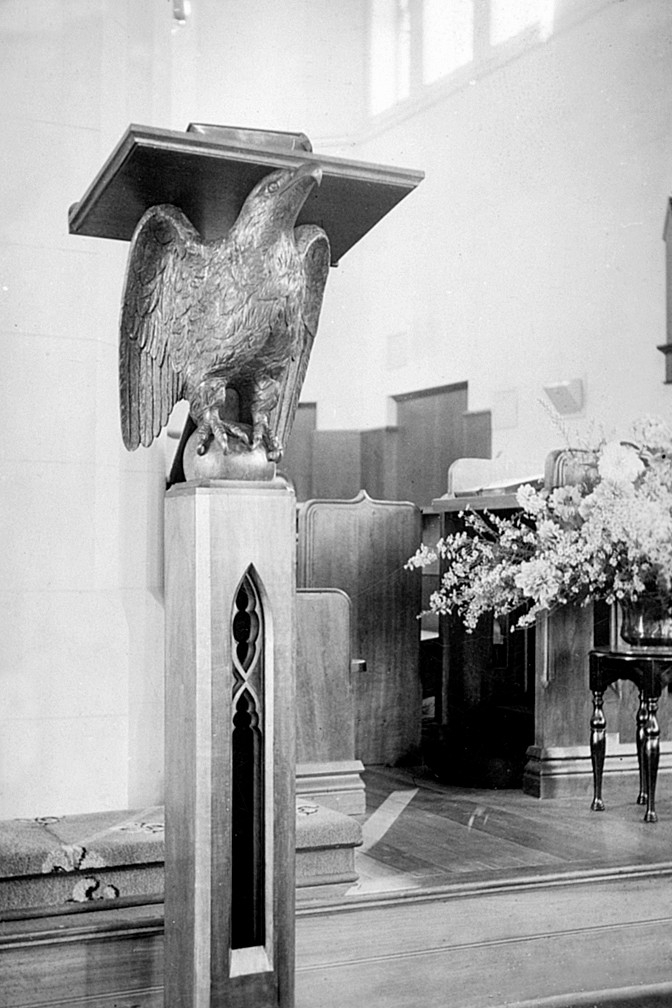
Eagle lectern carved in wood by Walter Langcake, showing Germanic influence of his training.

He was active between 1912 and the mid-1960s and was one of the last of the classical school of carvers produced in Australia. Many of his commissions adorn major city cathedrals, public buildings and memorials.

His grandfather migrated to Victoria from England in 1852 to prospect in the Castlemaine goldfields. Although Langcake's parents were not artistic, he was apprenticed in his mid-teens to a German immigrant woodcarver. In 1913 he married Elsie Isabel Johnson and they had four daughters; one dying in infancy.

As a young man he took the pledge of the Independent Order of Rechabites, which promoted temperance in Melbourne at the turn of the 20th century. His abstinence was so strict, he refused to enter public houses even for meals.

Langcake was also a lifelong rationalist and became a trusted mentor to the younger anarchist writer Arthur "Bluey" Howells (1907–86), who was involved in the anti-Franco and pacifist movements between the wars. When Langcake's first grandson was born at the outbreak of World War II, he wryly observed "more cannon fodder".

His original Therry st. shopfront studio off Queen Victoria Market was the unusual setting for informal gatherings of Melbourne's radicals and progressives. By the mid-30s, Langcake's business was successful enough for him to move into more upmarket premises in the Queen Street Law Chambers building.

He specialised in near life-sized figures of Christ on the cross, eagle lecterns, cathedra, bas reliefs, commemorative plaques and coats of arms, but could also produce charmingly informal works, often decorative castings for hotels or unique private commissions, adorned with Australiana flora and fauna. Langcake frequently worked with the prolific church architect Louis R. Williams on major projects around Australia.

He was entrusted to sculpt heritage logs of exceptional age (greater than 1,000 years), circumference or cultural significance. He often sourced his wood from North Queensland old-growth forests.

Langcake was also skilled in all aspects of cabinetry; creating fine articles of carved wooden furniture. His technique for alloy pieces was creation in wood and realization in cast metal, usually bronze (e.g. the Australian American War Memorial wreath).

During the 1940s he also taught woodcarving to trade students at Collingwood Technical School. Howells praised his artistry as a true sculptor in wood.

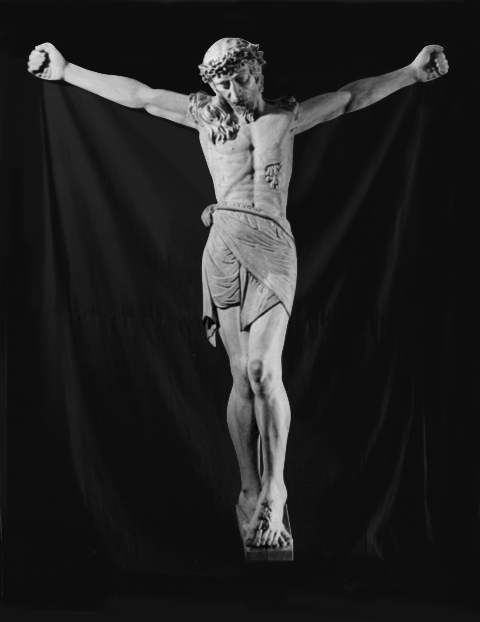
Life-sized figure of Christ for altar, 1937, St. Thomas Aquinas' Church, Sth Yarra, Vic.

In the early 1960s Langcake moved from inner Melbourne to Frankston on the Mornington Peninsula to live next to one of his daughters. His modest workshop full of wood shavings, jars of preserved insects or the odd snake, and old copies of Australian Walkabout magazine for inspiration, was built at the back of his house. He died in his sleep of a heart attack in 1967.

== Representative works ==
Some of his major known works on public display include:

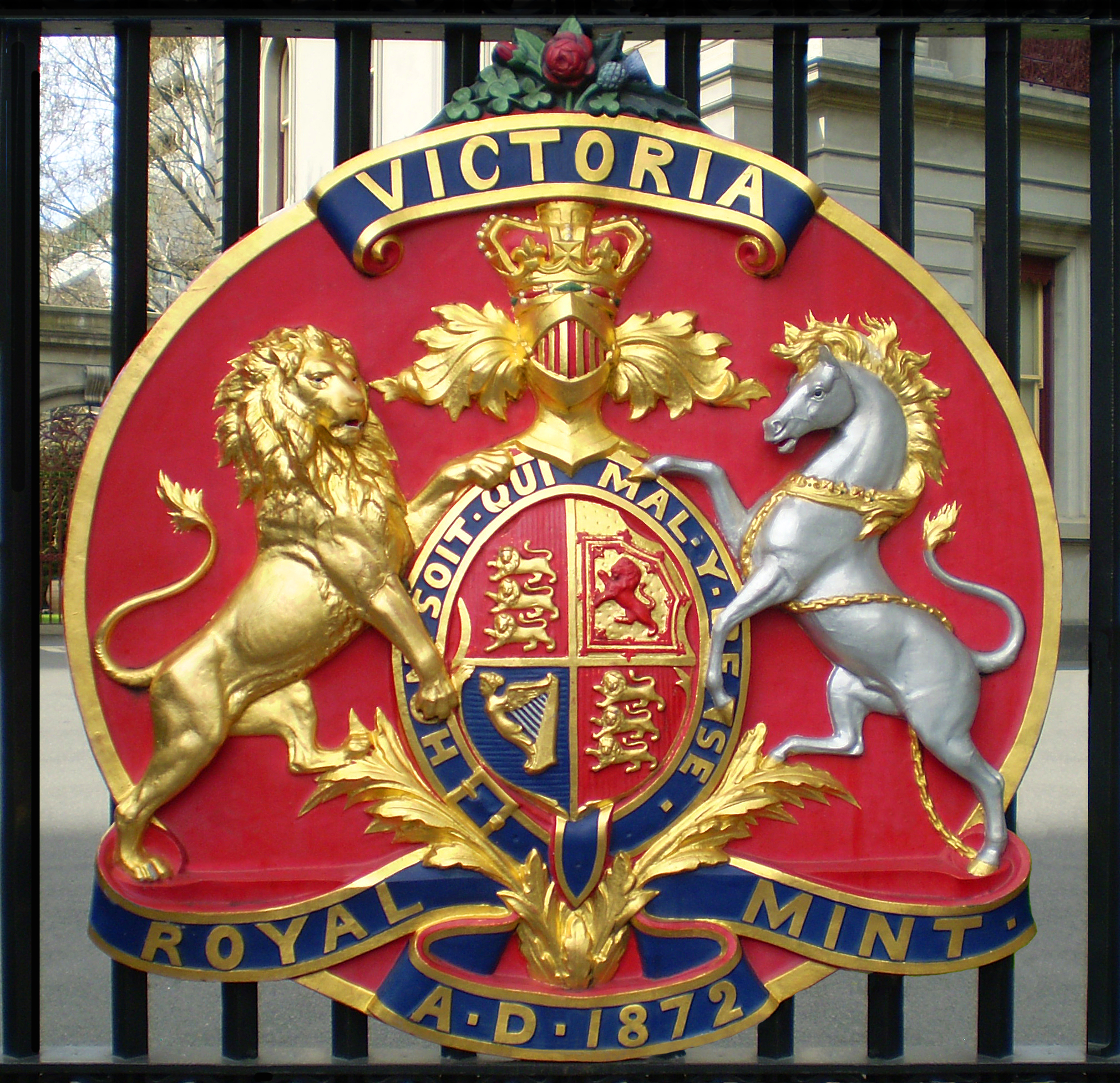
Coat of arms on gates of the Royal Melbourne Mint

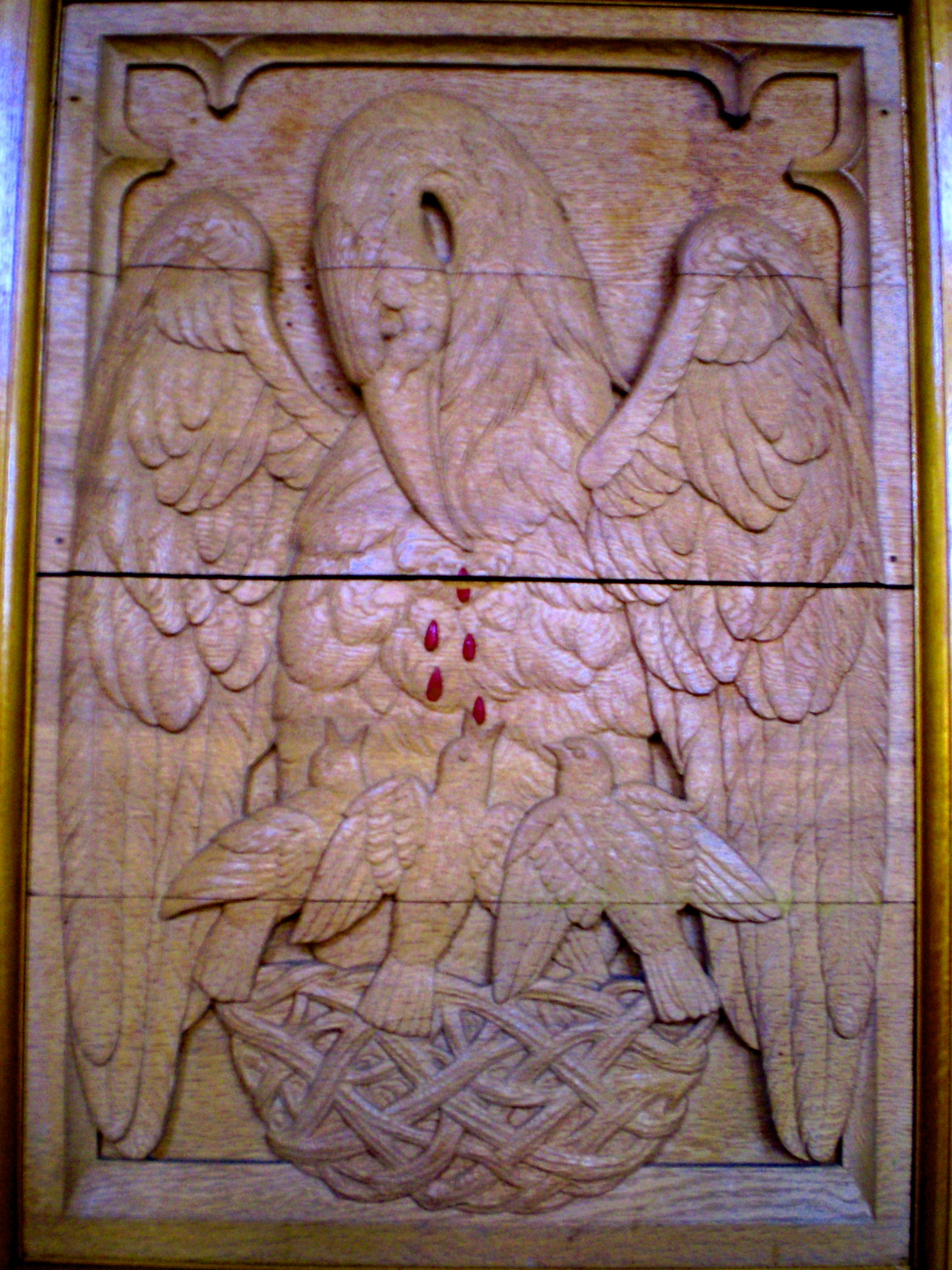
"The Pelican in Her Piety", timber panel bas relief, 1959, St. John's Church, Camberwell, Vic.

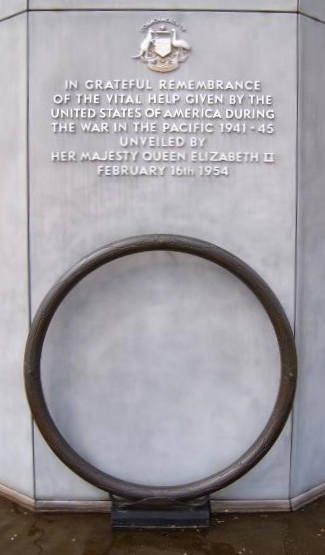
Bronze wreath at base of Australian American War Memorial, Canberra

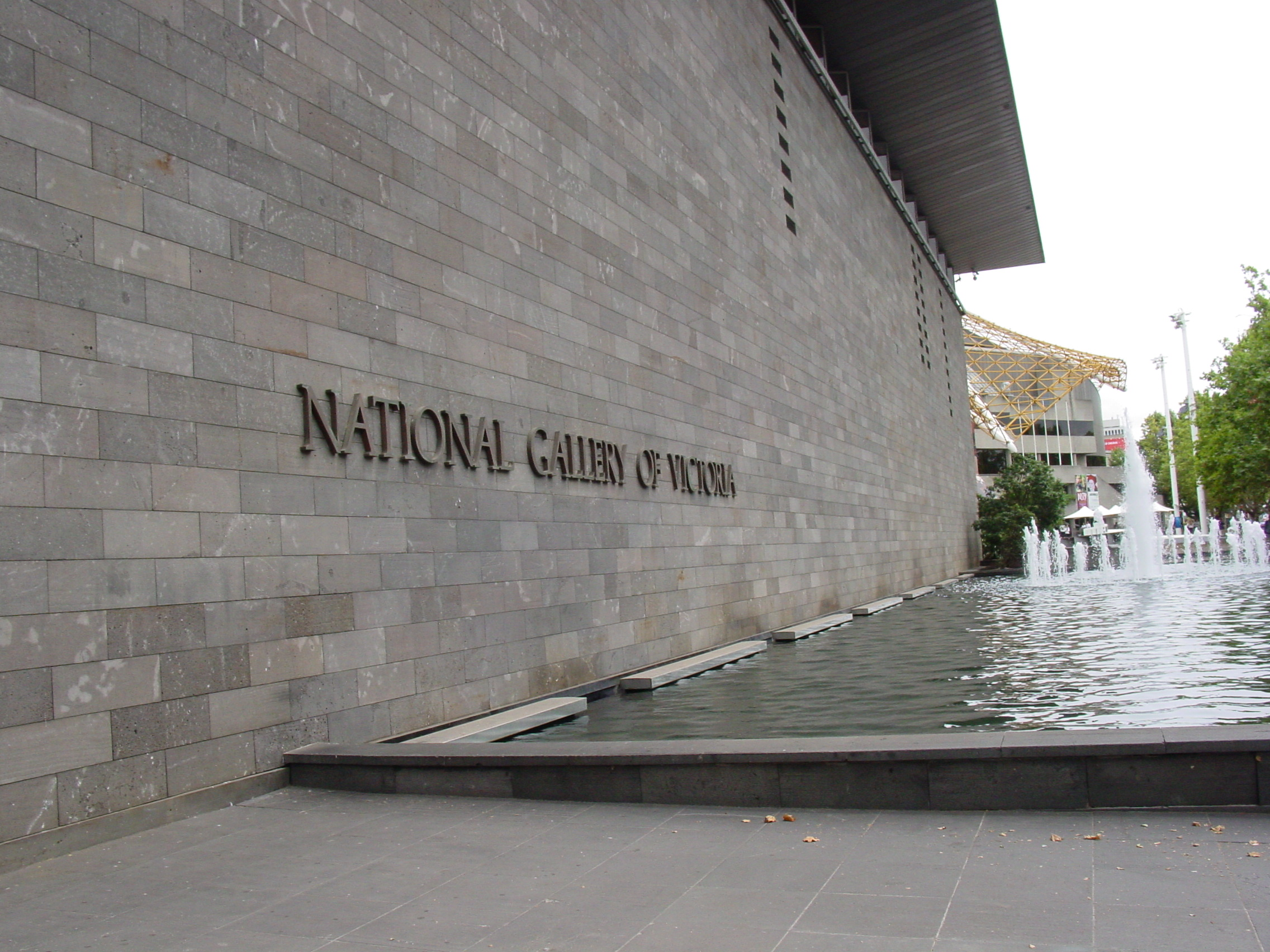
Entrance sign of the National Gallery of Victoria, St Kilda Road, Melbourne

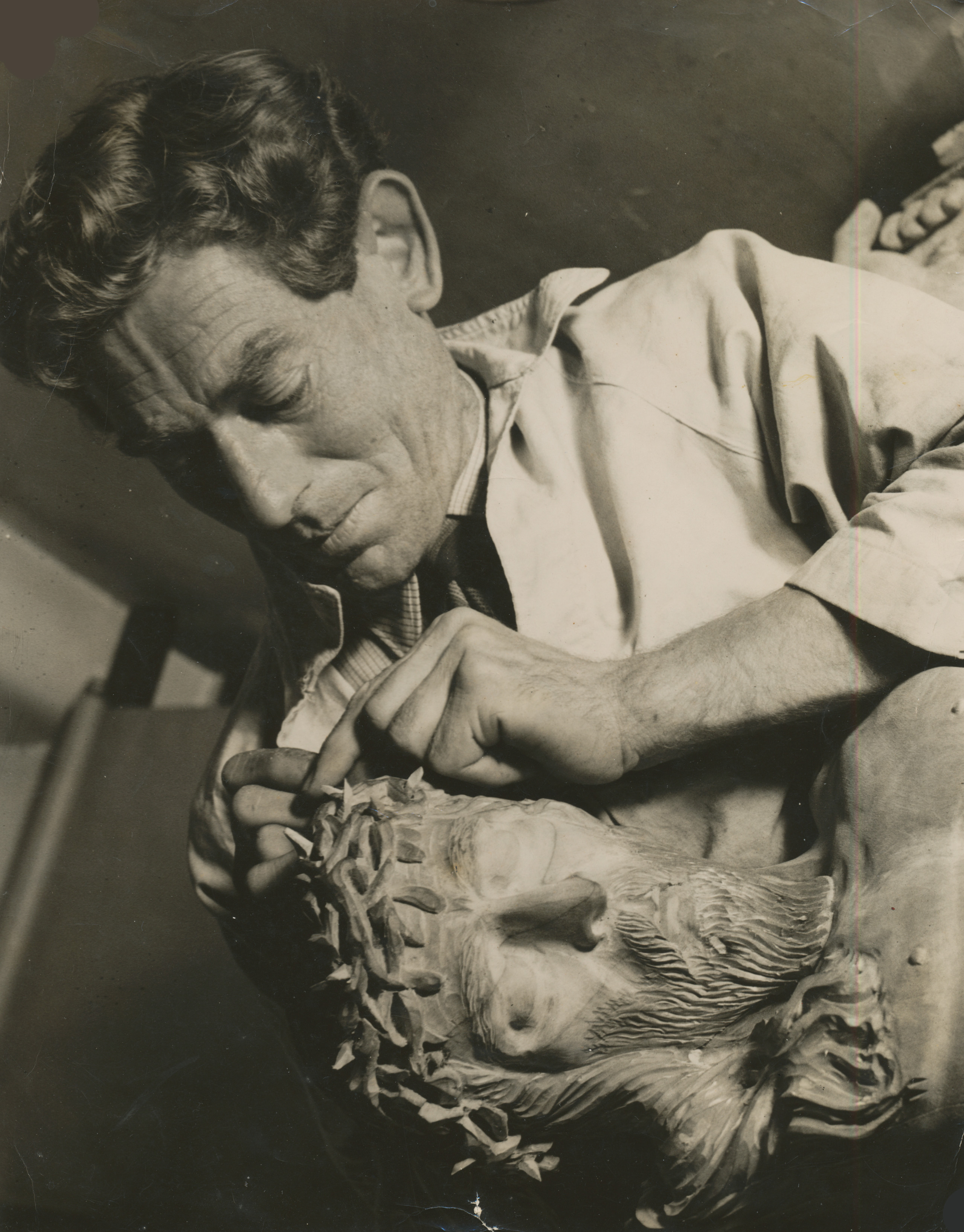
Langcake finishing the Aquinas' figure (opposite)
- Coat of arms on gates of old Royal Melbourne Mint, crn. William and Latrobe Street
- Wreath at base of Australian American War Memorial, Canberra
- Baptismal font cover, St Paul's Cathedral, Melbourne
- Stations of the Cross, St Patrick's Cathedral, Melbourne
- National Gallery of Victoria front entrance lettering above the moat, St Kilda Road
- Life-sized figure of Christ in Queensland beech wood, 1937, that surmounts the reredos of the altar in St. Thomas Aquinas' Church, South Yarra, Victoria
- Carved mitre, relief panel of eagle on a lectern, and St Alban's shield, Anglican Cathedral Church of St. Alban the Martyr, Griffith, New South Wales
- Two Queensland black bean wood memorials with ecclesiastical emblems, Presbyterian Church of Armadale, Victoria
- Bishop's throne, St James' Cathedral, Townsville, Queensland
- "The Pelican in Her Piety," timber panel bas relief, 1959, St John's Anglican Church, Camberwell, Victoria
- Shire of Hastings Coat of arms, Hastings, Victoria
- Lectern, St Paul's Anglican Church, Frankston
- Lectern, St Luke's Church, Frankston
- Original communion table and pew end carvings, St Andrew's Church, Frankston
- Pew ends carved with ships' badges of the Royal Australian Navy, St Mark's chapel, HMAS Cerberus, Crib Point, Victoria
- Pew ends decorated with Australian animals and birds, chapel, former Burwood Boys Home, Burwood, Victoria
- 1939–1945 War Memorial Panel surmounted by cabinet with Christ figure on the cross, the Lady chapel of St Jude's Anglican Church, Brighton, South Australia
- Australian Army memorial gate plaques dedicated to 1st Division of United States Marine Corps following the Battle of Guadalcanal, outside former Balcombe Army Base, Mount Martha, Victoria (now entrance to Mace oval and on display in reception area of Mt. Martha House Community Center)
