= Moira Kelly (humanitarian) =

Australian humanitarian worker (born 1964)

Moira Kelly AO
- Born: Moira Therese Kelly; 31 January 1964 (age 62); Melbourne, Victoria
- Citizenship: Australia
- Occupation: Humanitarian aid worker
- Children: 4
- Website: www.moirakellyaustralia.com www.creatinghopefoundation.org.au www.globalgardensofpeace.org

Moira Therese Kelly AO (born 31 January 1964) is an Australian Catholic humanitarian worker. In 2001, she was awarded the Order of Australia in recognition of her humanitarian service to both the Australian and international communities. In 2012, Kelly received the Victorian of the Year award and in 2003 and 2004, she was nominated for the Australian of the Year awards.

== Biography ==
Born in Melbourne on 31 January 1964, Kelly first developed an interest in disadvantaged children when, as an 8-year-old, she saw a documentary film about Mother Teresa and decided she wanted to be an aid worker. As a primary school student in Carlton, she would climb the fence of her school to help feed the children at the special school next door. In 1982, after completing year 10 at St Aloysius' Girls' College in North Melbourne, she left school and completed a course to be a special education teaching assistant and in 1984 trained as a lay missionary and completed a probation officer course for working with young offenders. She then travelled to Western Australia and worked as a "house mother" at an Aboriginal mission. On returning to Melbourne, she sold her car to finance her airfare, and left for Calcutta where she stayed and worked with Mother Teresa's Missionaries of Charity. Kelly, a practising Catholic, remained in India with Mother Teresa for six months until her visa expired. In 1987 she returned to India and continued her work with Mother Teresa and in 1988 she was honoured as an Australian Bicentenary Young Woman of the Year for her work in community services and the Advance Australia Ambassador Award.

In 1992, Kelly received the Paul Harris Rotary International Award for her work in The Bronx, New York City and in 1994 she was awarded the first Sir Edward Dunlop award for humanitarian service. In 1994, while in Bosnia and Herzegovina, Kelly started Nobody's Children, a volunteer program at a refugee camp. She became the program's Director of Field Operations and organised aid and welfare programs in several refugee camps in Bosnia and Herzegovina, including opening two pharmacies, starting a free mobile dental health care clinic, starting a home care program, organising the emergency medical evacuation of patients to hospitals overseas, and developing education and recreation programs. Kelly left the Nobody's Children program in 1997.

Kelly returned to Australia in the late 1990s and in 1999, she set up the non-profit organisation Children First Foundation. Children in developing countries who have existing and often serious health problems, which local doctors are unable to treat effectively, are referred to the Foundation by aid workers, medical staff and church ministries and missions. The Foundation then facilitates the provision of medical treatment, often bringing the children to Melbourne's Royal Children's Hospital and the Epworth Hospital, where specialist medical and nursing staff donate their expertise. Specialists in New York, Boston and Ireland have also donated their services. In 2001, Kelly and the Children First Foundation opened a farm in Kilmore known as the Open Door Rotary Farm, where she accommodates and cares for the children brought to Australia for treatment. Donated and built by Rotary, the property includes a purpose-built house with 12 bedrooms where children having surgery and medical treatment can rehabilitate before returning home to their families. The Children First Foundation has brought children to Australia for medical treatment from countries including Albania, Djibouti, East Timor, Indonesia, Fiji, Papua New Guinea, Nauru, Nigeria, Zambia and the Solomon Islands.

== Awards and recognition ==
In 2001, Kelly's humanitarian work was recognised with several awards, including the Prime Minister's Award for outstanding community service, the White Flame Award from Save the Children for her service to disadvantaged children, and she was made an Officer of the Order of Australia in recognition of her service to both the Australian and international communities. In 2003, Kelly received the Victorian of the Year award, and in 2003 and 2004, she was nominated for the Australian of the Year awards.

A Compassionate Rage is a 2001 documentary film by Film Australia and Alan Lindsay following Kelly for 18 months on her missions overseas as she tries to organise medical treatment for sick and injured children.

In 2013, Kelly founded Global Gardens of Peace, a newly humanitarian organisation based in Melbourne to provide safe play and garden areas in post-war and third-world countries. Alongside a team of dedicated volunteers, the inaugural garden is to be established in Gaza City in Palestine. She was inducted onto the Victorian Honour Roll of Women in 2014.

During a 2017 concert of Coldplay, the band performed the song Imagine with Emmanuel Kelly in recognition of Moira Kelly's work.

== Twins ==
Herself a twin, Kelly is now the legal guardian of the originally cranially conjoined twins from Bangladesh, Trishna and Krishna, separated in 2009 in a 38-hour operation at Melbourne's Royal Children's Hospital by a 16-member team of specialist medical and nursing staff led by Wirginia Maixner, director of neurosurgery at the hospital. Their birth mother, a twenty-two-year-old student completing final exams at the Keshobpur Agricultural College in Jessore, gave the twins up for adoption in a Dhaka orphanage. On 8 February 2012, their story was featured on the U.S. Public Broadcasting Service science television series NOVA.

Kelly is also the adoptive mother of Iraqi-born brothers Emmanuel and Ahmed Kelly. The brothers, born with "severely underdeveloped limbs" due to chemical warfare, were discovered by Kelly in 1998 at the Mother Teresa Orphanage in Baghdad. Kelly brought them both to Australia for medical treatment and subsequently adopted them. In 2009, Ahmed and Emmanuel Kelly became Australian citizens. Ahmed, a quadruple amputee and swimmer, represented Australia in the 50-metre breaststroke, 50-metre backstroke, 150-metre individual medley, and the 100-metre freestyle at the 2012 Summer Paralympics.

Emmanuel Kelly was a contestant on the 2011 season of The X Factor. He was cut from the competition on 11 September 2011, "after forgetting the lyrics several times during his performance." Following his appearance on The X-Factor, he met with producers and auditioned for The Glee Project.
