= Wirginia Maixner =

Australian neurosurgeon (born 1963)

- Born: 1963 (age 62–63)
- Known for: 2007 performed the first auditory brainstem implant on a child in Australasia; 2009 separation of conjoined twins
- Medical career
- Profession: Director of Neurosurgery
- Institutions: Royal Children's Hospital, Melbourne
- Sub-specialties: Neurosurgery
- Research: Pediatric Hydrocephalus, Spina Bifida, traumatic brain injury, Neuro-Oncology, Neuropathology, Neurosurgery

Wirginia June Maixner (born 1963) is an Australian neurosurgeon and the director of neurosurgery at the Royal Children's Hospital in Melbourne, Australia. She is known for having performed the first auditory brainstem implant on a child in Australia in 2007, and later having separated the conjoined twins, Trishna and Krishna in 2009.

== Early life and education ==
Maixner grew up on Sydney's northern beaches. Her father was a window dresser and her mother, a public servant. Inspired by her aunt who was Australia's first female flying doctor, she pursued a career in medicine and surgery.

Maixner attended Sancta Sophia College, University of Sydney, and in 1986 graduated from the University of Sydney's School of Medicine with a Bachelor of Medicine, Bachelor of Surgery.

She became the third woman accepted into the Royal Australasian College of Surgeons four-year neurosurgery training program. In the early 1990s, while half-way through her training, she became pregnant with her daughter. She remained in the program and became the first person to be granted maternity leave by the Royal Australasian College of Surgeons. Maixner went on to complete her training as a single parent and later spent two years in Paris and Canada gaining international hospital experience.

== Career ==
Maixner was appointed to the position of Director of the Royal Children's Hospital Neurosurgery Department in 2001, becoming one of the youngest neurosurgery department heads in Australia and the first female head of neurosurgery at the Children's Hospital.

From October 2001 until July 2004 Maixner served on the Victorian Surgical Consultative Council, a special purpose council established in 2001 by the then-Minister of Health, John Thwaites, which reports to the Minister for Health and analyses, studies and reports on potentially preventable surgical deaths in Victoria, with the aim of improving the safety and quality of surgery in Victoria.

In 2006, Maixner was credited with performing "ground-breaking" surgery when she operated on a three-year-old girl to successfully stop seizures caused by a rare genetic condition. Maixner told media at the time that the surgery was of the same complexity as open-heart surgery.

On 16 May 2007, Maixner worked with Rob Briggs, the medical director at the Royal Victorian Eye and Ear Hospital's Cochlear Implant Clinic and using "pioneering technology" they performed the first auditory brainstem implant on a child in Australasia. At the time, the surgery was hailed as an advancement that "could pave the way for revolutionary advances in medicine".

Between 30 and 31 August 2009, Maixner presented at the XIV World Congress of Neurological Surgery in Boston, Massachusetts as a faculty member of the "Pediatric Neurosurgery: An Overview with Sub-specialty Applications" program and as a panelist on the "Chiari Type I Malformation in Children" discussion panel.

On 16 and 17 November 2009, Maixner led a team of 16 neurosurgeons, plastic surgeons, and other specialist medical staff at the Royal Children's Hospital in the 32-hour "groundbreaking surgery" to successfully separate three-year-old Bangladeshi conjoined twins, Trishna and Krishna. The twins were found in 2007 by two Australian Aid volunteers in Mother Teresa's orphanage in Dhaka and brought to Australia by Moira Kelly and the Children First Foundation for life saving medical treatment, which involved a series of operations in January, February, March, May, October, and November 2008 and January and August 2009, in preparation for the final separation in November 2009. Maixner had performed four major operations on the twins to separate and close shared blood vessels and insert tissue expanders and prior to the final surgery, she gave the twins a 25 percent chance of surviving the operation, a 25 percent chance of dying and a 50 percent chance of suffering "catastrophic" brain damage, but without surgical intervention, both children would die. On 19 November 2009, Maixner told the press that Trishna had woken from the medically induced coma. Krishna began to wake up on 20 November 2009. On 21 December 2009, five weeks after the surgery to separate the twins, they were released from the hospital.

On 26 November 2009, Maixner and other members of the medical and surgical team who cared for Trishna and Krishna were honoured with a civic reception hosted at Government House in Melbourne by Governor of Victoria, David de Kretser and Premier John Brumby.

Maixner and fellow Royal Children's Hospital neurosurgeon Alison Wray sat for Australian artist Raelene Sharp in December 2009. Sharp's portrait of the surgeons was submitted to the Australian portrait competition, the Archibald Prize. The competition was judged in March 2010 and carries a A$50,000 prize. Maixner was also featured in a photo shoot by The Australian Women's Weekly in December 2009.

In 2023, the Royal Children's Hospital awarded Maixner the Elizabeth Turner medal for the excellence she demonstrated in clinical care. As of 2023, Maixner continued to practice neurosurgery, and has expressed that her greatest achievement at the Royal Children's Hospital is helping to grow a cohesive unit, based on respect, that nurtures people to become the best that they can be.

Maixner left the Royal Children's Hospital in 2025.

== Selected works ==
- Maixner, Wirginia J. (Editor), and Cinalli, Giuseppe (Editor), Sainte-Rose, Christian (Editor), Pediatric Hydrocephalus, Springer, USA, 9 November 2004, ISBN 88-470-0225-7
- Maixner, Wirginia; Kornberg, Andrew; Harvey, Simon; Nash, Margot; "Neurological condition", in Paediatric Handbook, Wiley-Blackwell, 5 August 2005, ISBN 978-0-86793-431-1
- Maixner, Wirginia J. (Editor), and Özek, M. Memet, (Editor), Cinalli, Giuseppe (Editor), Spina Bifida: Management and Outcome, Springer, USA, 7 July 2008, ISBN 88-470-0650-3
- Maxiner, Wirginia; Skelton, Ruth; Isaacs, David; "Sinusitis-induced subdural empyema", Disease in Childhood – The Journal of the British Paediatric Association, December 1992
- Maixner, Wirginia; Sekhon, Lali H. S.; Morgan, Michael K.; Besser, Michael; "Controversies in the Management of Brainstem Cavernous Angioma: Report of Two Cases", Journal of Surgery, 1992 62(10) 763–767
- Maixner, Wirginia; Caruso, Denise A.; Orme, Lisa M.; Neale, Alana M.; Radcliff, Fiona J.; Amor, Gerlinda M.; Downie, Peter; Hassall, Timothy E.; Tang, Mimi L.K.; and Ashley, David M.; "Results of a phase 1 study utilizing monocyte-derived dendritic cells pulsed with tumor RNA in children and young adults with brain cancer", Neuro-Oncology, 2004 6(3):236-246
- Maixner, Wirginia; Aziz, Azian Abd.; Coleman, Lee; Morokoff, Andrew; "Diffuse choroid plexus hyperplasia: an under-diagnosed cause of hydrocephalus in children?", Pediatric Radiology, Volume 35, Number 8, August 2005
- Maixner Wirginia; Heggie AA; Holmes A; Greensmith A; Meara J; Low P; "Complete correction of severe scaphocephaly: total vault remodelling with occipital elevation", International Journal of Oral and Maxillofacial Surgery, 2005; 34(Supp 1–029.1):57.
- Maixner, Wirginia, "Hypothalamic hamartomas—clinical, neuropathological and surgical aspects",Child's Nervous System, Volume 22, Number 8, August 2006
- Maixner, Wirginia; Haloi, Achyut K.; Ditchfield, Michael; "Mucocele of the sphenoid sinus", Pediatric Radiology, Volume 36, Number 9, September 2006
- Maixner, Wirginia, and Stargatt, Robyn; Rosenfeld, Jeffrey V.; Anderson, Vicki; Hassall, Timothy; Ashley, David; "Intelligence and adaptive function in children diagnosed with brain tumour during infancy", Journal of Neuro-Oncology, Volume 80, Number 3, December 2006
- Maixner, Wirginia; Gonzales, Michael; Dale, Susan; Susman, Marleen; Nolan, Prudence; Ng Wai, Hoe; Laidlaw, John; "Dysembryoplastic neuroepithelial tumor (DNT)-like oligodendrogliomas or Dnts evolving into oligodendrogliomas: two illustrative cases", Neuropathology : official journal of the Japanese Society of Neuropathology, 2007;27(4):324-30
- Maixner, Wirginia; Josan, Vivek; Smith, Paul; Kornberg, Andrew; Rickert, Christian; "Development of a pilocytic astrocytoma in a dysembryoplastic neuroepithelial tumor. Case report", Journal of Neurosurgery, 2007;106(6 Suppl):509-12
- Maixner, Wirginia; Stargatt, Robyn; Rosenfeld, Jeffrey V.; Ashley, David; "Multiple factors contribute to neuropsychological outcome in children with posterior fossa tumors", Developmental Neuropsychology, 2007;32(2):729-48
- Maixner, W. and Poomthavorn, P., Zacharin, M., "Pituitary function in paediatric survivors of severe traumatic brain injury", Archives of Disease in Childhood, February 2008; 93: 133–137
