= Julie Bines =

Australian paediatric gastroenterologist

Julie Bines is a clinician and researcher working in Melbourne, Australia. Alongside being a professor and deputy head of the Department of Paediatrics at the University of Melbourne, she is also a paediatric gastroenterologist at the Royal Children's Hospital Melbourne and is the leader of the Enteric Diseases group at the Murdoch Children's Research Institute. Bines is the joint head of the WHO Collaborative Centre for Child Health and founding member of Women in Global Health Australia.

“Think broadly, don’t be siloed within your own discipline; listen to what’s happening in the community.” Bines, in an interview with Engaging Women.

== Career and research ==
Bines attended Monash University, graduating with a Bachelor of Medicine, Bachelor of Surgery (MBBS) in 1982, later attaining her Doctorate of Medicine from the University of Melbourne in 1990. She trained as a clinical and research fellow in Paediatric Gastroenterology and Nutrition at Massachusetts General hospital and Harvard Medical School, Boston (1988–91) and a postdoctoral fellow at the Massachusetts Institute of Technology (1989–91). After travelling through Asia, Africa and Europe for 12 months during her residency at the Royal Children's Hospital, Bines became fixed on pediatrics with a focus on addressing the global disparity in healthcare. Beyond her contributions to rotavirus research and vaccine development, Bines' recent research has expanded to investigate the impact of the COVID pandemic on women and children worldwide.

=== Novel rotavirus vaccine development ===
Bines and her team developed a novel oral rotavirus vaccine (RV3-BB) as a global vaccine against infant rotavirus infection based on a naturally occurring and attenuated human strain of rotavirus originally isolated from healthy babies. Rotavirus can be prevented, there are two available vaccines, however vaccine cost makes it unaffordable for many developing countries. An estimated 1,205 children die from rotavirus disease each day, and 82% of these deaths occur in children in the poorest countries. Bines and her team successfully developed an affordable rotavirus vaccine that is orally administered and accessible to newborns, who are particularly susceptible to the virus.

Clinical trials were carried out in Australia, New Zealand, Malawi and Indonesia, achieving 95% protection about severe rotavirus-associated gastroenteritis in the first year of life and up 75% protection in infants up to 18 months of age. Trial funding was provided by the National Health and Medical Research Council (NHMRC), Bill & Melinda Gates Foundation and PT BioFarma. Providing an affordable vaccine that can be easily stored, delivered, and administered at birth is crucial, as mothers and babies are more likely to be with a healthcare provider at that time. Most notably, this vaccine has been developed to improve efficacy and availability in developing countries by optimizing the delivery time and developing manufacturing processes to reduce production costs.

=== Outreach ===
Bines has been involved in outreach campaigns to dispel myths and misinformation about vaccines, as well as appearing on national radio to talk about her work.

== Awards and honours ==
- 2021 Fellow of the Australian Academy of Health and Medical Sciences
- 2021 Eureka Prize, Research and Innovation Category
- 2007 American Gasteoenterology Association Fellow
- 2004 NHMRC Practitioner Fellowship

== Selected publications ==
- Safety and immunogenicity of human neonatal RV3 rotavirus vaccine (Bio Farma) in adults, children, and neonates in Indonesia: Phase I Trial
- Safety and immunogenicity of RV3-BB human neonatal rotavirus vaccine administered at birth or in infancy: a randomised, double-blind, placebo-controlled trial
- Developing a manufacturing process to deliver a cost effective and stable liquid human rotavirus vaccine
- Genotype Diversity before and after the Introduction of a Rotavirus Vaccine into the National Immunisation Program in Fiji
- Rotavirus specific maternal antibodies and immune response to RV3-BB rotavirus vaccine in central java and yogyakarta, Indonesia
- Immune responses to SARS-CoV-2 in three children of parents with symptomatic COVID-19
- Conquering rotavirus: From discovery to global vaccine implementation
