= Australian–American Memorial =

Memorial in Canberra

Coordinates: 35.297562°S 149.151592°E

- Canberra
- Australian–American Memorial
- For American service personnel assistance during the war in the Pacific
- Unveiled: 16 February 1954
- Location: Field Marshal Sir Thomas Blamey Square, Russell, Canberra
- Designed by: Richard Minchin Ure
- In grateful remembrance of the vital help given by the United States of America during the war in the Pacific 1941-1945. Unveiled by Her Majesty Queen Elizabeth II; 16 February 1954

The Australian–American Memorial is a memorial commemorating the assistance rendered by the United States to Australian forces during the Pacific War, during World War II. It is located in Canberra, the national capital of Australia, and was unveiled in 1954.

== Background ==
In 1948 the Australian-American Association proposed "to establish a Memorial in Canberra in the form of a monument or statue, to perpetuate the services and sacrifices of the United States forces in Australia and to symbolise Australian-American comradeship in arms". After an appeal for finances by then Prime Minister of Australia, Sir Robert Menzies, the Australian people subscribed more than the eventual cost of £100,000, then a vast sum of money for such a public memorial (equivalent to $13,840,000 in 2022), indicating the gratitude of the nation. Additional memorials were constructed in Brisbane and Adelaide that used the surplus funds.

A committee, which included Richard Casey (then Minister for External Affairs and a former Australian Ambassador to the United States) and Sir Keith Murdoch, was formed to examine designs for the monument. Sydney architect and World War 2 veteran, Richard M. Ure won the design following a nationwide competition. Work commenced in December 1952 and took just over a year.

As Vice President of the United States, Richard Nixon visited the site in the early stages of construction. It was unveiled by Queen Elizabeth II on 16 February 1954. Among subsequent inspections by dignitaries, the completed memorial was viewed in October 1966 by President Johnson, during the first official tour of Australia by a sitting U.S. president.

== Description ==
The memorial is a hollow, octagonal, tapered column with a steel framework sheeted with aluminium panels that were sandblasted to give the appearance of stone. Two murals feature at the base, one relating the story of American combat in the Pacific and the other a profile map of the United States in copper. The column is surrounded by a water-filled moat about 3 metres (9.8 ft) wide. Under the dedication is a bronze wreath, carved by Walter Langcake, where floral wreaths are often laid on official commemorations. The column is topped with a bronze sphere surmounted by a stylised figure of the American eagle by the distinguished sculptor and Royal Navy veteran, Paul Beadle. The Memorial's height is 79 metres (259 ft); the eagle and sphere are together around 11 metres (36 ft) high and weigh 3.5 tons.

The memorial is familiarly known as "Bugs Bunny", "Phallus in Blunderland" or the "Chicken on a Stick".

== Location ==
It was built at Russell Hill on the extended line of Kings Avenue, near one of the three nodes of the Parliamentary Triangle. Russell Offices has since been developed around the memorial, as the headquarters of the Australian Defence Force and the Department of Defence, with the immediate surrounds called Blamey Square after Field Marshal Sir Thomas Blamey.

The memorial underwent a major restoration in 2014, after which a new plaque at its base was unveiled.

== Gallery ==
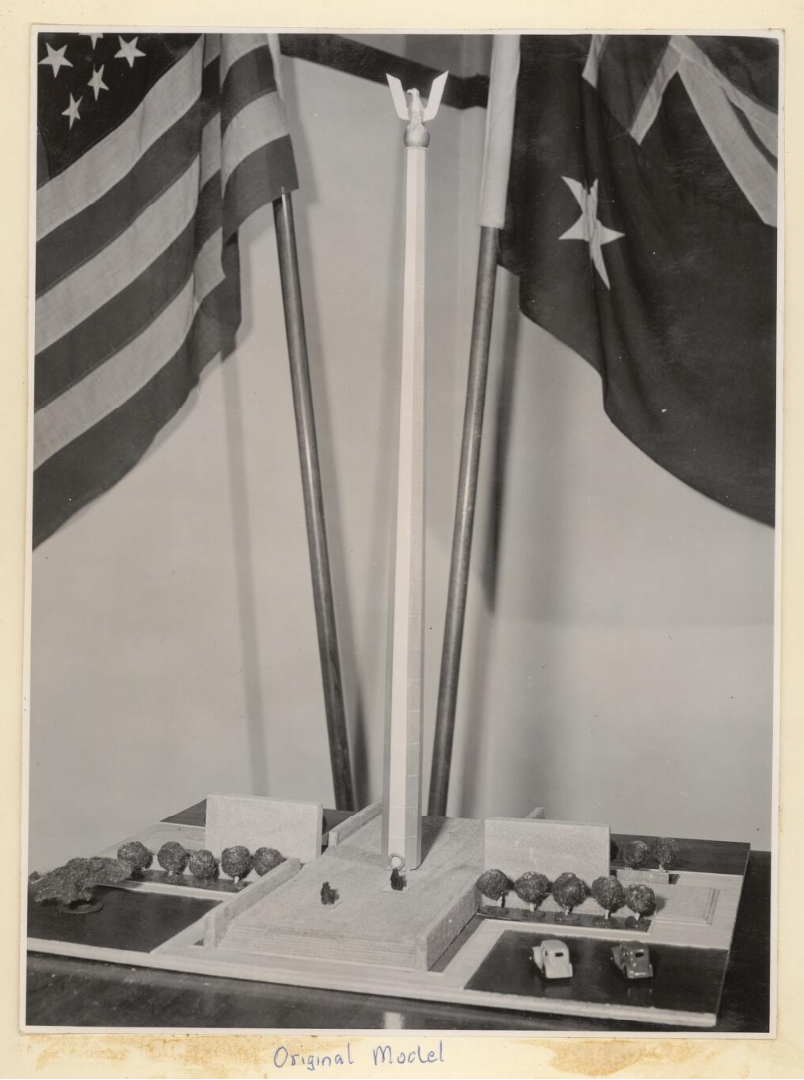
Original model of the Australian–American Memorial in 1953

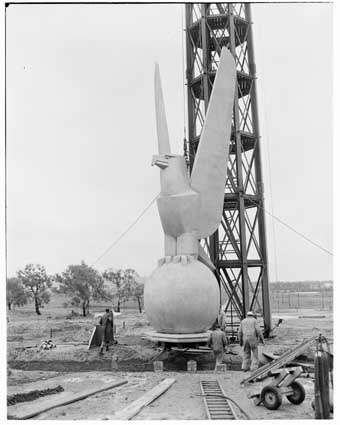
Eagle and sphere Australian–American Memorial at Russell Hill, 15 September 1953

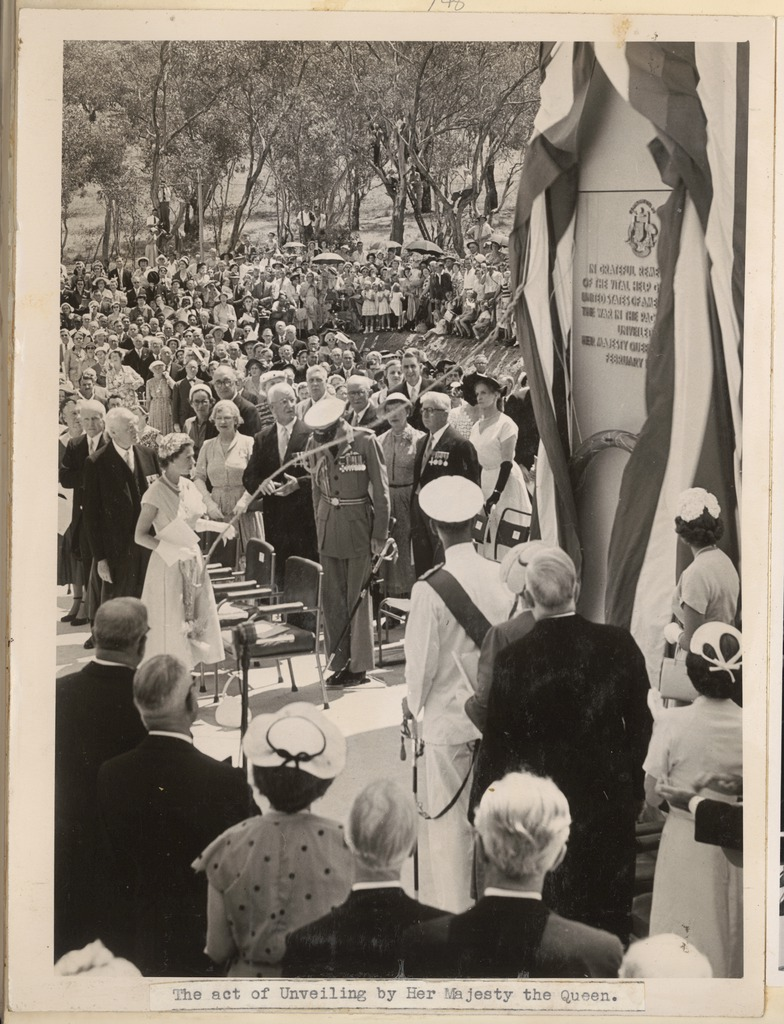
Official unveiling of the Australian–American Memorial on 16 February 1954

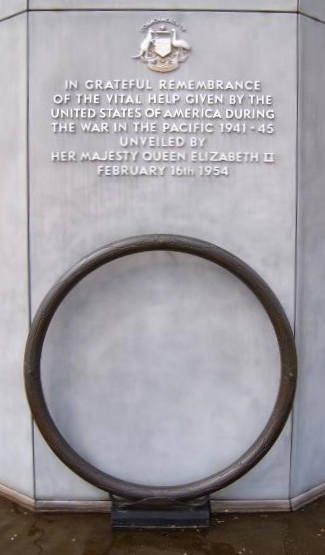
Inscription marking the unveiling of the monument

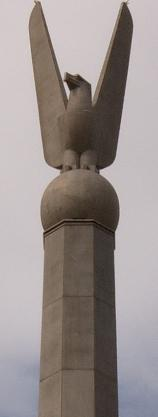
Detail of eagle

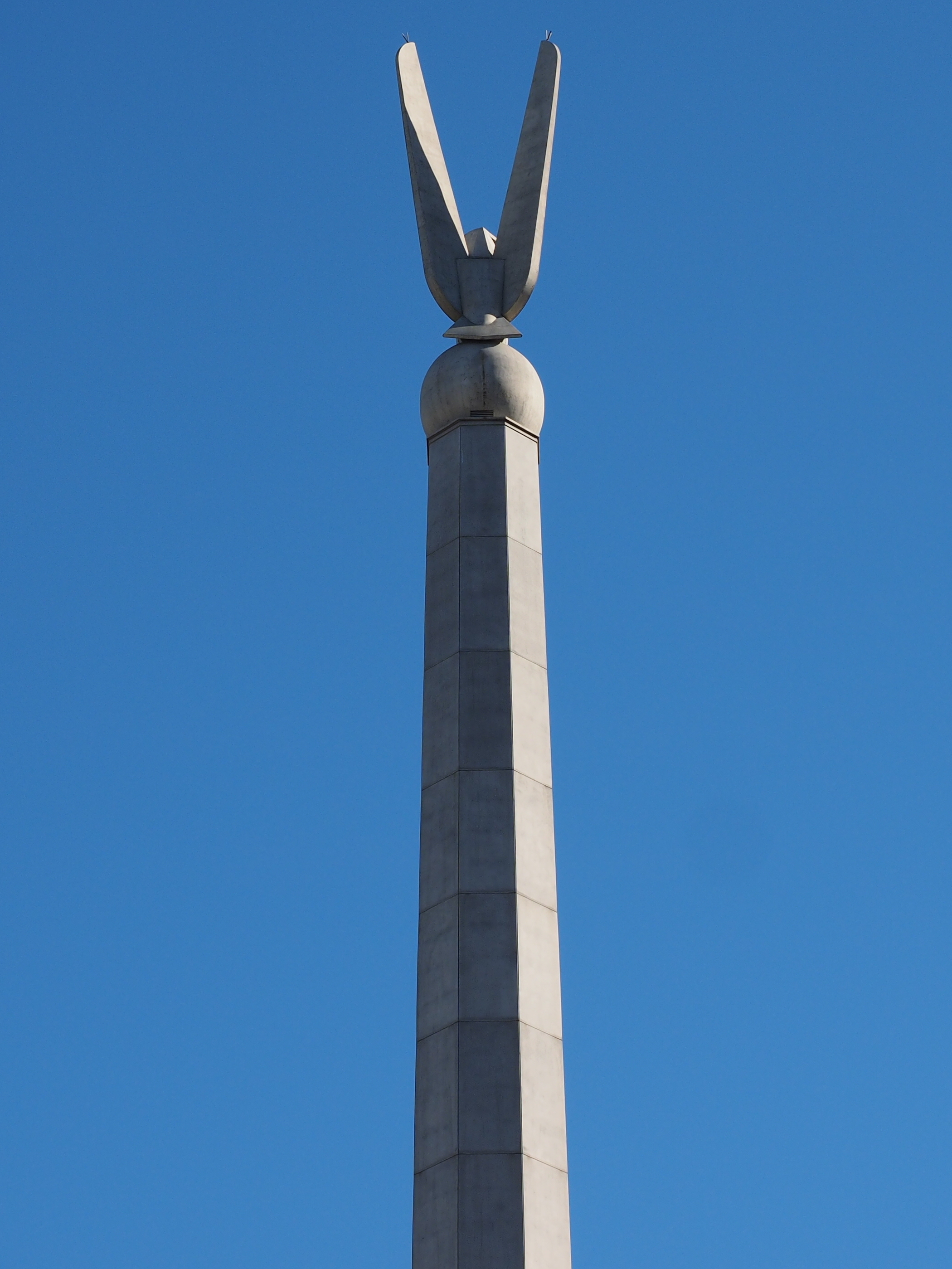
Rear of the eagle

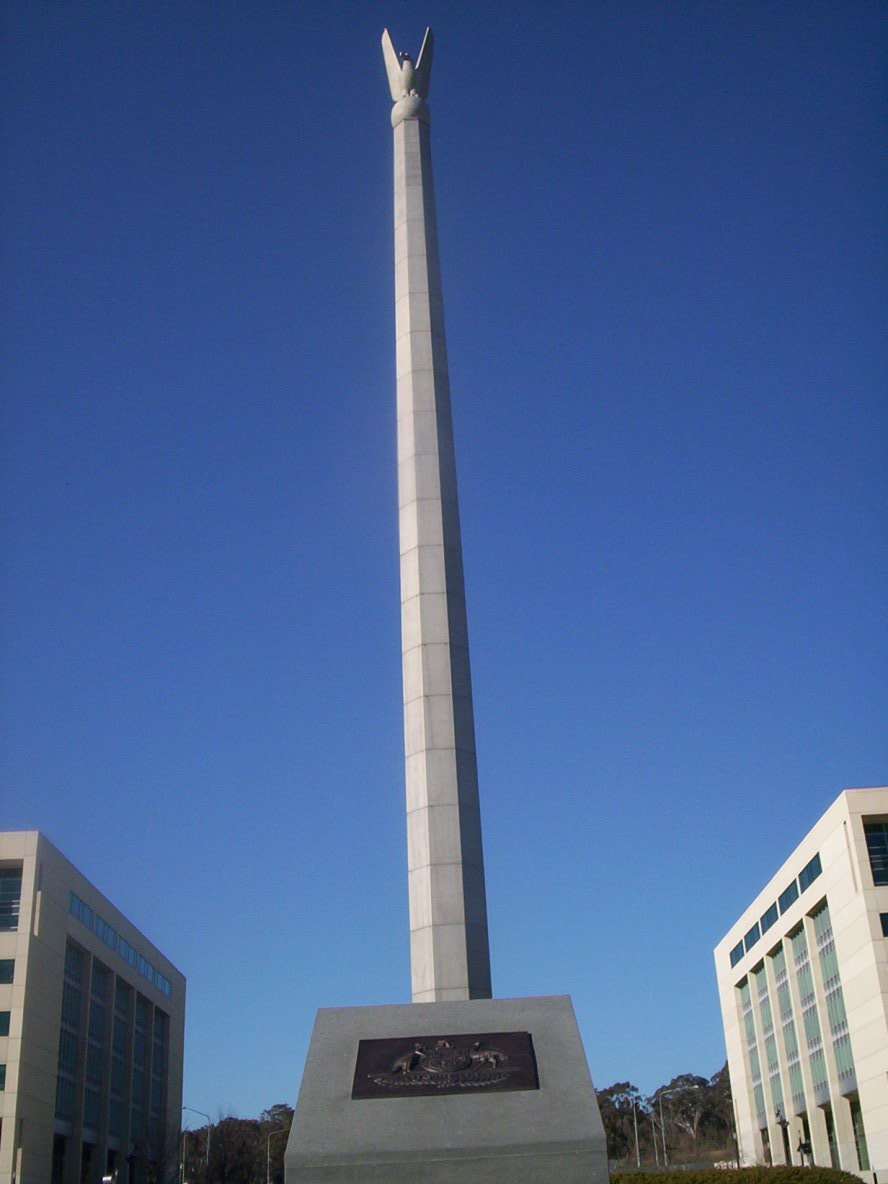
View from below

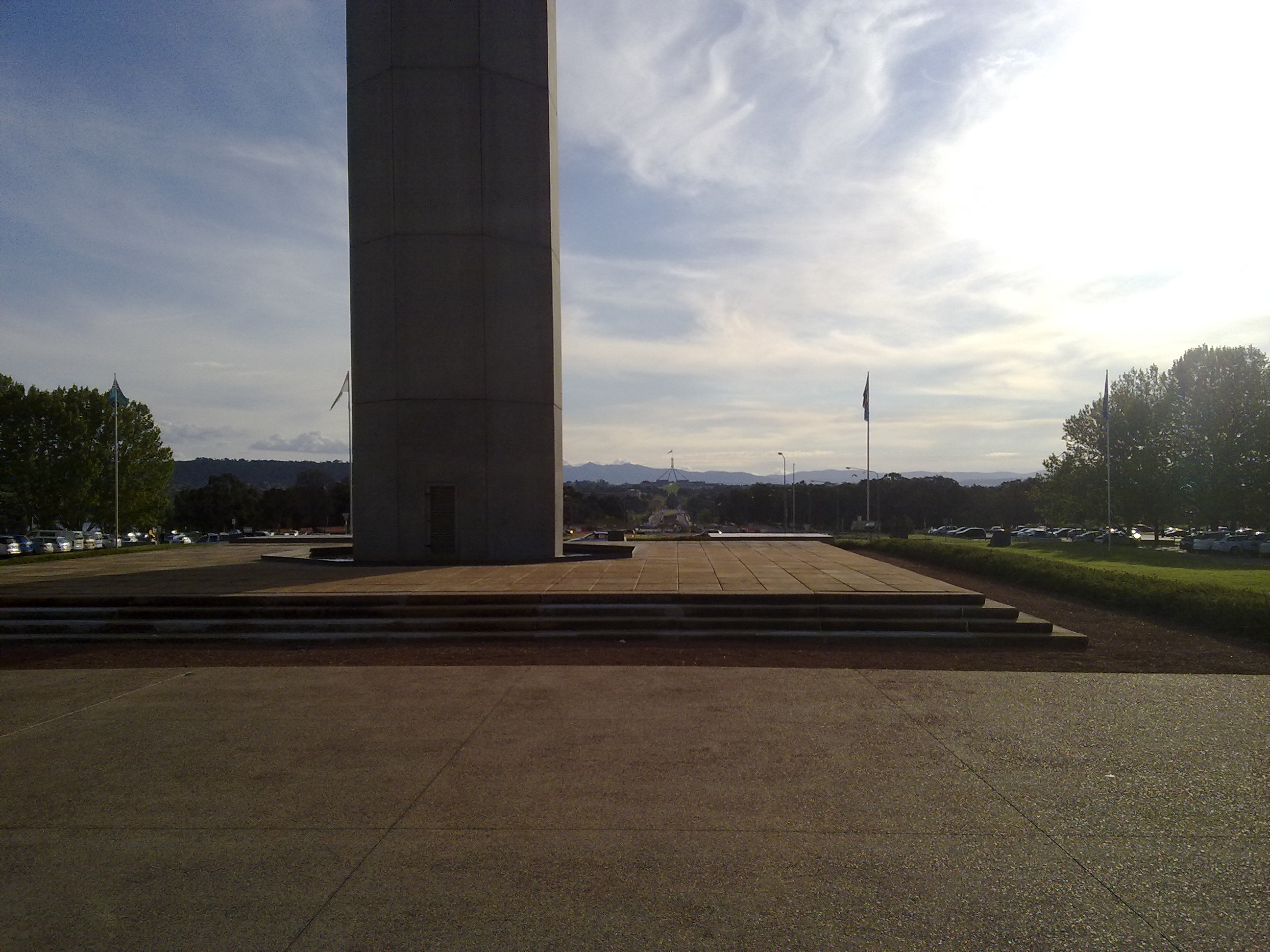
From the base of the memorial looking west along Kings Avenue towards the New Parliament House.

== See also ==
- Australia–United States relations
- Pacific War
