= Royal Children's Hospital =

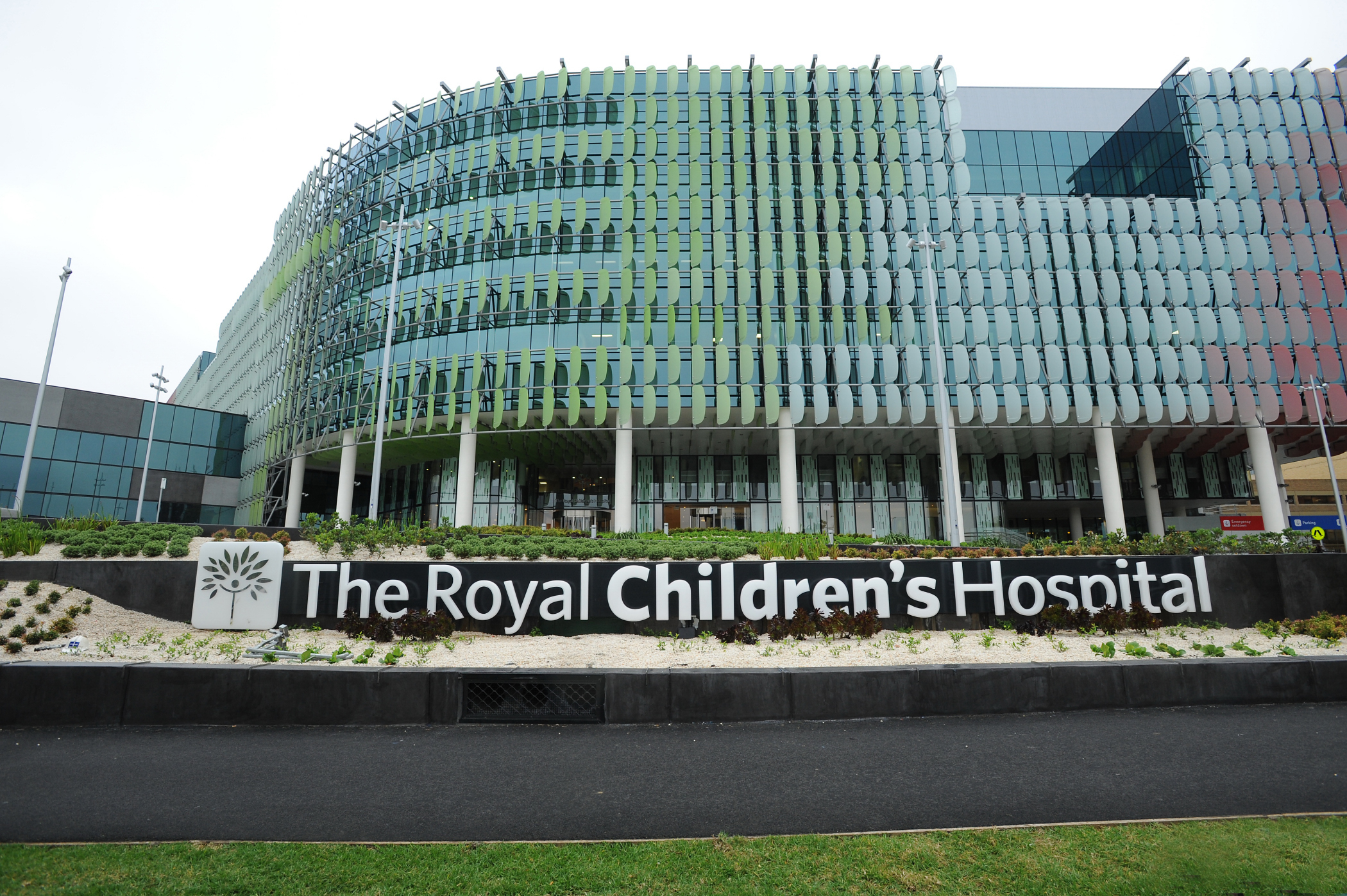

Geography
- Location: Melbourne, Victoria, Australia
- Coordinates: 37°47′42″S 144°56′59″E

Organisation
- Care system: Medicare
- Type: Specialist
- Affiliated university: University of Melbourne and Murdoch Children's Research Institute

Services
- Beds: 340
- Speciality: Children's hospital

Helipads
- Helipad: (ICAO: YRHO)
Number	Length		Surface
Number	ft	m	Surface
1			aluminium
2			aluminium
3			aluminium

History
- Founded: 1870 (founding); 2011 (present site)

Links
- Website: www.rch.org.au

The Royal Children's Hospital (RCH), colloquially referred to as the Royal Children's, is a major children's hospital in Parkville, a suburb of Melbourne, Victoria, Australia. Regarded as one of the great Children's hospitals globally, the hospital and its facilities are internationally recognised as a "leading centre for paediatrics". The hospital serves the states of Victoria, and Tasmania, as well as southern New South Wales and parts of South Australia. Patients from countries with a Reciprocal Health Agreement with Australia may be treated at the hospital.

As a major specialist paediatric hospital in Victoria, the Royal Children's Hospital provides a full range of clinical services, tertiary care, as well as health promotion and prevention programs for children and young people.

The hospital is the designated statewide major trauma centre for paediatrics in Victoria and a Nationally Funded Centre for cardiac and liver transplantation.

Its campus partners are the Murdoch Children's Research Institute and The University of Melbourne Department of Paediatrics, which are based on-site at the hospital.

== History ==
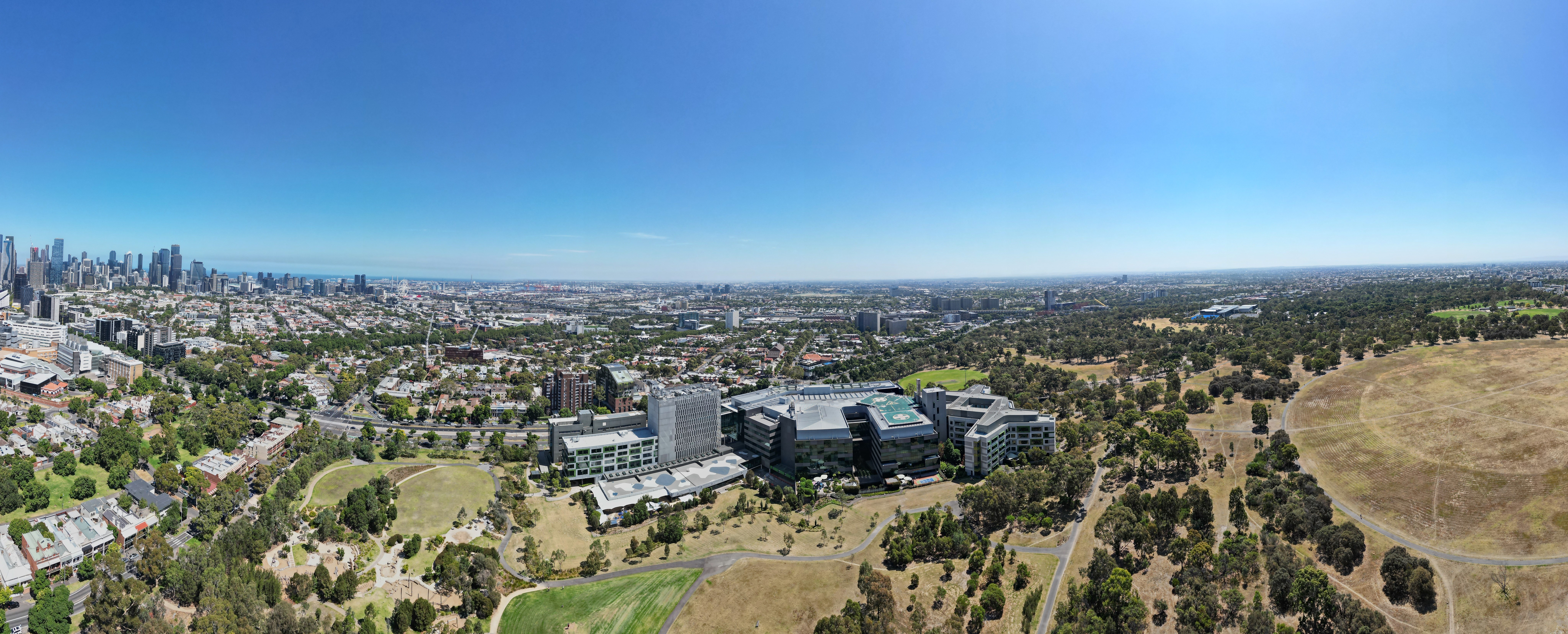
Aerial panorama of Royal Park and the Children's Hospital. The Melbourne skyline sits on the left of the horizon.

=== Establishment and early years ===
The hospital was established in 1870, founded by doctors John Singleton and William Smith, in response to their serious concerns about infant mortality in the fledgling city of Melbourne. The original "Free Hospital for Sick Children" was set up in a small house at 39 Stephen Street (now 49 Exhibition Street) and treated more than 1,000 children in its first year of operation.

Unusually for the time, the hospital's committee of management was dominated by women from the outset. Frances Perry was elected as the inaugural president of the committee of management, although she was unsuccessful in imposing a Protestant religious ethos on the hospital. Artist Elizabeth Testar was another member of the first committee. In its earliest years, the hospital relied extensively on charitable donations with little government support available. The management committee influenced patient admissions, often turning away children from wealthier families who they believed could afford private care.

=== Carlton: 1876–1963 ===
In 1876, the hospital purchased a large mansion in Carlton previously owned by Redmond Barry for £10,000 (equivalent to $1,600,000 in 2022). The hospital's premises at Carlton continued to expand rapidly until the 1920s, when the need for a larger campus and purpose-built hospital became apparent.

William Snowball was an influential paediatrician at the hospital from 1878 until his death in 1902, working to "improve accommodation and hygiene conditions for children in medical care, training structures for nursing staff, and research into diseases afflicting his patients". Sarah Anne Bishop served as the hospital's nursing matron around the same time period, overseeing a tenfold increase in the number of nursing staff, improvements for staff and patients, and the establishment of the hospital's nursing training school. In 1898, Ethel Cowan became the first woman appointed as a resident doctor at the hospital.

The RCH Auxiliary movement was established by Mary Guthrie in 1922 to coordinate volunteering and fundraising efforts at the hospital. Ella Latham, former president of a suburban auxiliary, served as president of the RCH committee of management from 1933 to 1954. In conjunction with medical director Vernon Collins and lady superintendent Lucy de Neeve, she oversaw the transition of the hospital "from a charity hospital to an institution that provided medical services of the highest quality, education and training facilities for staff, a research organisation in both curative and preventive medicine, and a link with the university".

=== Move to Parkville and further expansion: 1963–present ===
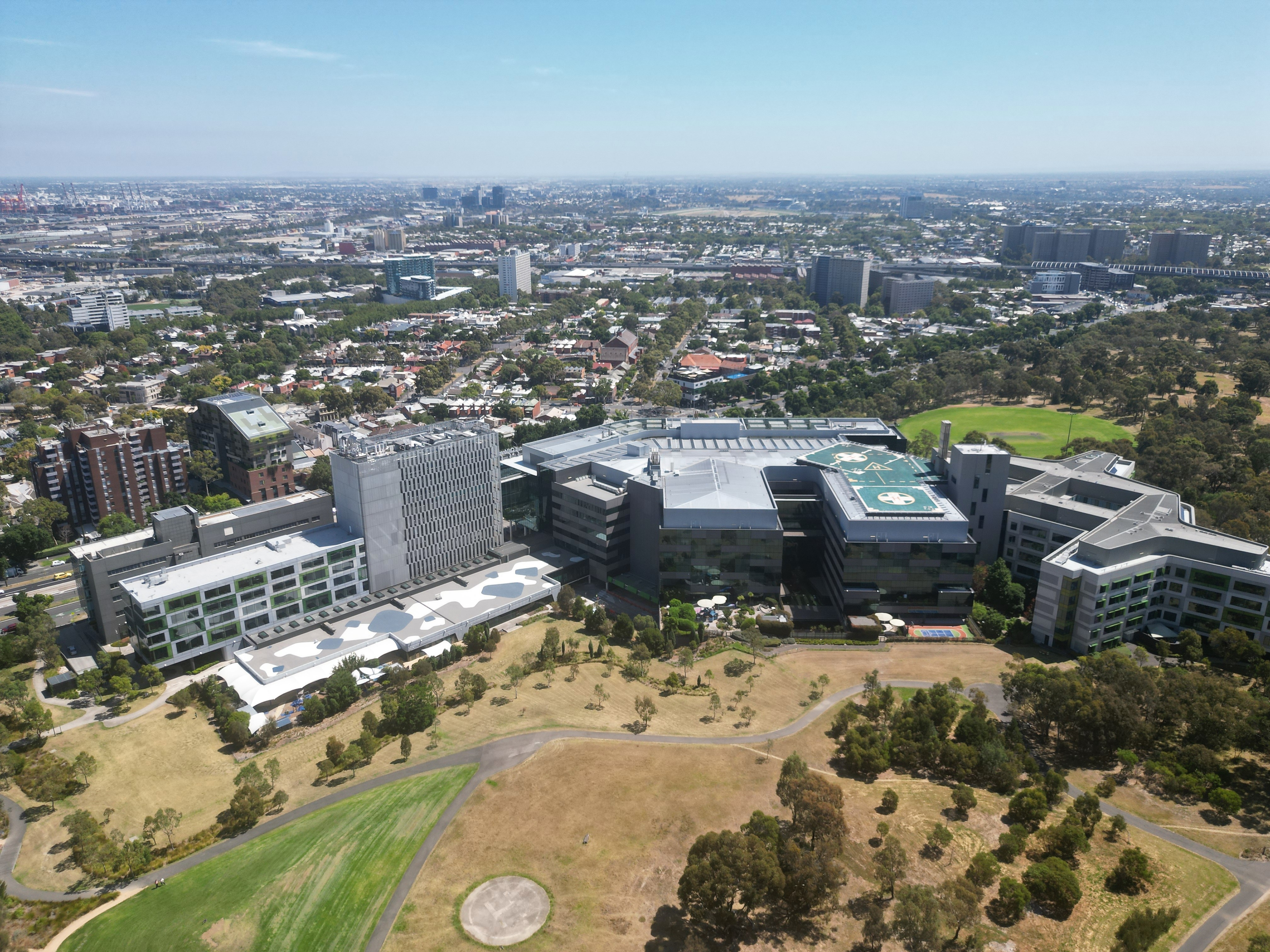
The Royal Children's Hospital as seen from Royal Park Melbourne

The hospital moved to the corner of Flemington Road and Gatehouse Street in Parkville in 1963.

In 2005, the Victoria State Government announced plans to build a brand new 340 bed home for RCH adjacent to the existing site. The winning bid of the redevelopment was led by Babcock & Brown with architects Billard Leece Partnership and Bates Smart Architects. HKS Inc. Architects of Dallas, Texas provided Paediatric Design and Planning Services and consulting engineers Norman Disney & Young. Work commenced on the site in late 2007, and was completed in late 2011, opened by Her Majesty Queen Elizabeth II on her Royal Tour. Patients were moved into the new hospital in November 2011. The project won the 2012 Melbourne Prize and the Victorian Architecture Medal.

After the move to new facility, demolition of the old site was completed by December 2012. Much of the old site was turned back into parkland, creating a new gateway to Royal Park. Landscaping of the park was complete by 2015.

== Good Friday Appeal ==
The Good Friday Appeal is held annually to raise money for the hospital. It has been broadcast on the Seven TV network for 52 years. The goal of the Appeal is to ensure that children with life-threatening illnesses receive the best possible medical and clinical care.

The 2009 Appeal raised $13,862,734. The 2010 Appeal raised $14,462,000. The 2011 Appeal raised $15,156,000. The 2012 Appeal raised $15,820,640. The 2013 appeal raised $16,405,534.65. The 2016 Appeal, raised $17,445,624. The 2017 Appeal, raised $17,605,662.

A new record was set in 2018, with the appeal raising $18,043,251.

== Centre for Adolescent Health, Gender Service ==
The RCH Centre for Adolescent Health, Gender Service provides a multidisciplinary approach to the assessment, care and treatment of gender dysphoria for children aged 3 to 17 years. In 2003 it received 1 referral, increasing to 7 referrals in 2007. In 2015 it was expected that there would be more than 150 referrals, with a one-year waiting list. The Andrews government said it will spend an extra $6 million over four years to reduce waiting times. During 2016 the gender clinic is expecting to receive at least 250 referrals.

In April 2025, the Royal Children's Hospital's Gender Service came under national scrutiny during a high-profile decision of the Federal Circuit and Family Court of Australia in Re: Devin. The Court identified the hospital's former Director of Adolescent Medicine, Dr Michelle Telfer, as the previously anonymous "Professor L," whose expert evidence was heavily criticised for ideological bias, lack of scientific neutrality, and failure to conduct a comprehensive psychosocial assessment of a biologically male child at the centre of the case.

Justice Strum found that the Gender Service adhered rigidly to a gender-affirming treatment model, dismissing broader clinical concerns and showing insufficient caution in light of emerging international evidence. The Court cited the UK's Cass Review and ruled that the child's welfare was best served by avoiding medicalised interventions such as puberty blockers, directly rejecting the approach advocated by clinicians at the hospital.

The ruling triggered renewed public and professional debate regarding paediatric gender medicine in Australia, particularly the role of the Royal Children's Hospital in shaping national treatment protocols. It also raised concerns about the influence of Victoria's Change or Suppression (Conversion) Practices Prohibition Act 2021 on clinical decision-making, with testimony suggesting that clinicians felt unable to explore non-affirming treatment pathways.

== RCH awards ==
=== Elizabeth Turner medal ===
Each year since 2002, the Elizabeth Turner Medal has been awarded to senior medical or dental practitioners at the RCH who have consistently shown excellence in clinical care over an extended period of time. It is the highest honour of peer recognition at the hospital.

The medal was named in honour of Elizabeth Kathleen Turner AO (1914-1999) who was a Paediatrician at the hospital from 1942 until 1980, and was the Medical Superintendent from 1943 until 1946. She was the first doctor in Australia to administer penicillin. The medal was named in her honour to acknowledge her devotion to the care of her patients.

Past recipients of the award include plastic surgeon Tony Holmes in 2004, and neurosurgeon Wirginia Maixner in 2023.

=== Barnes-Hutson medal ===
On the 150th anniversary of the hospital the medical staff association established the Barnes-Hutson medal to acknowledge outstanding contributions to the fabric of the hospital.

The medal is named in honour of Graeme Barnes (Gastroenterology) and John Hutson (General Surgery and Urology) in acknowledgment of their all-round contribution to clinical practice, research, education, and mentorship.

The inaugural award was presented to Gastroenterologist Winita Hardikar in 2021, Community paediatrician Jill Sewell received the award in 2022, and Gastroenterologist Prof Julie Bines received the award in 2023.

== Arms ==
Coat of arms of Royal Children's Hospital
Notes Granted 5 May 1966 Crest On a wreath Argent Gules and Azure on water barry wavy Argent and Azure an Australian Pelican naiant Proper. Escutcheon Per chevron Argent and Azure in chief two Rods of Aesculapius erect Proper the serpents respectant Vert in base a representation of the Constellation of the Southern Cross with five mullets Argent on a chief Gules a lion passant Or. Supporters On the dexter side a boy Proper vested in a short tunic Argent edged at the neck and sleeves and pendent from a cincture a purse Or shoes Vert and on the sinister side a girl Proper vested in a long sleeveless dress edged at the neck and hem and cinctured Or shoes Vert. Motto Fide Scientia Et Amore

== See also ==
- List of hospitals in Australia
- Healthcare in Australia
