= Melian Stawell =

Australian classical scholar (1869–1936)

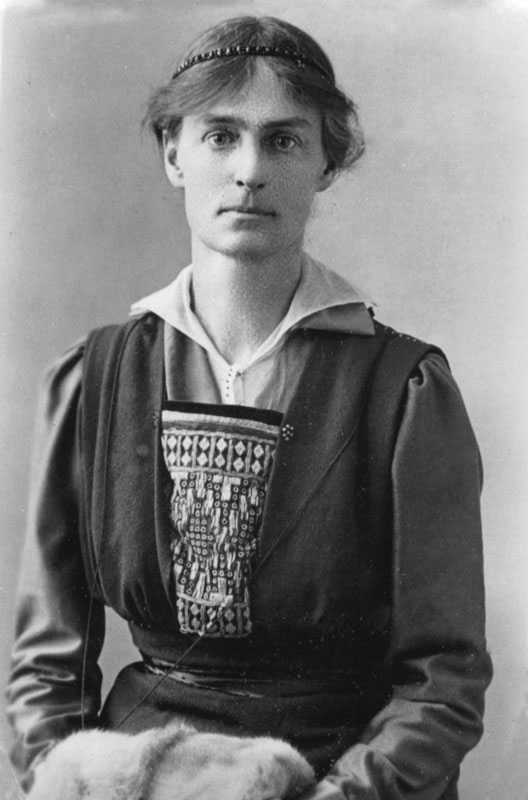
- Stawell during the late 19th or early 20th century
- Born: Florence Melian Stawell; 2 May 1869; Kew, Melbourne, Colony of Victoria
- Died: 9 June 1936 (aged 67); Headington, Oxford, England
- Partner: Clare Reynolds
- Father: Sir William Stawell
- Relatives: Richard Rawdon Stawell (brother)

Academic background
- Education: Trinity College, Melbourne; Newnham College, Cambridge

Florence Melian Stawell (2 May 1869 – 9 June 1936), also known as F. M. Melian and F. Melian, was an Australian classical scholar, internationalist campaigner and writer, active in England.

== Early life and family ==
Stawell was born Florence Melian Stawell on 2 May 1869 in Kew, Melbourne to Sir William Stawell, a lawyer and Chief Justice of the Supreme Court of Victoria, and Mary Frances Elizabeth Stawell (née Greene). Both of Stawell's parents were born in Ireland to Anglo-Irish ascendancy families. The ninth of ten siblings, Stawell was the younger sister of the physician Richard Rawdon Stawell.

At her father's preference Stawell was known by her middle name, Melian, which had been held by three previous women in her paternal family. Raised at D'Estaville, the family travelled to Europe in 1873. Her father returned to Australia in 1875, whilst Stawell remained in Europe with her mother, some of her siblings and a governess until 1877. During this period Stawell travelled across in France, Switzerland, Italy and Britain. Upon returning to Australia, Stawell was educated at home and began to study Greek.

== Education ==
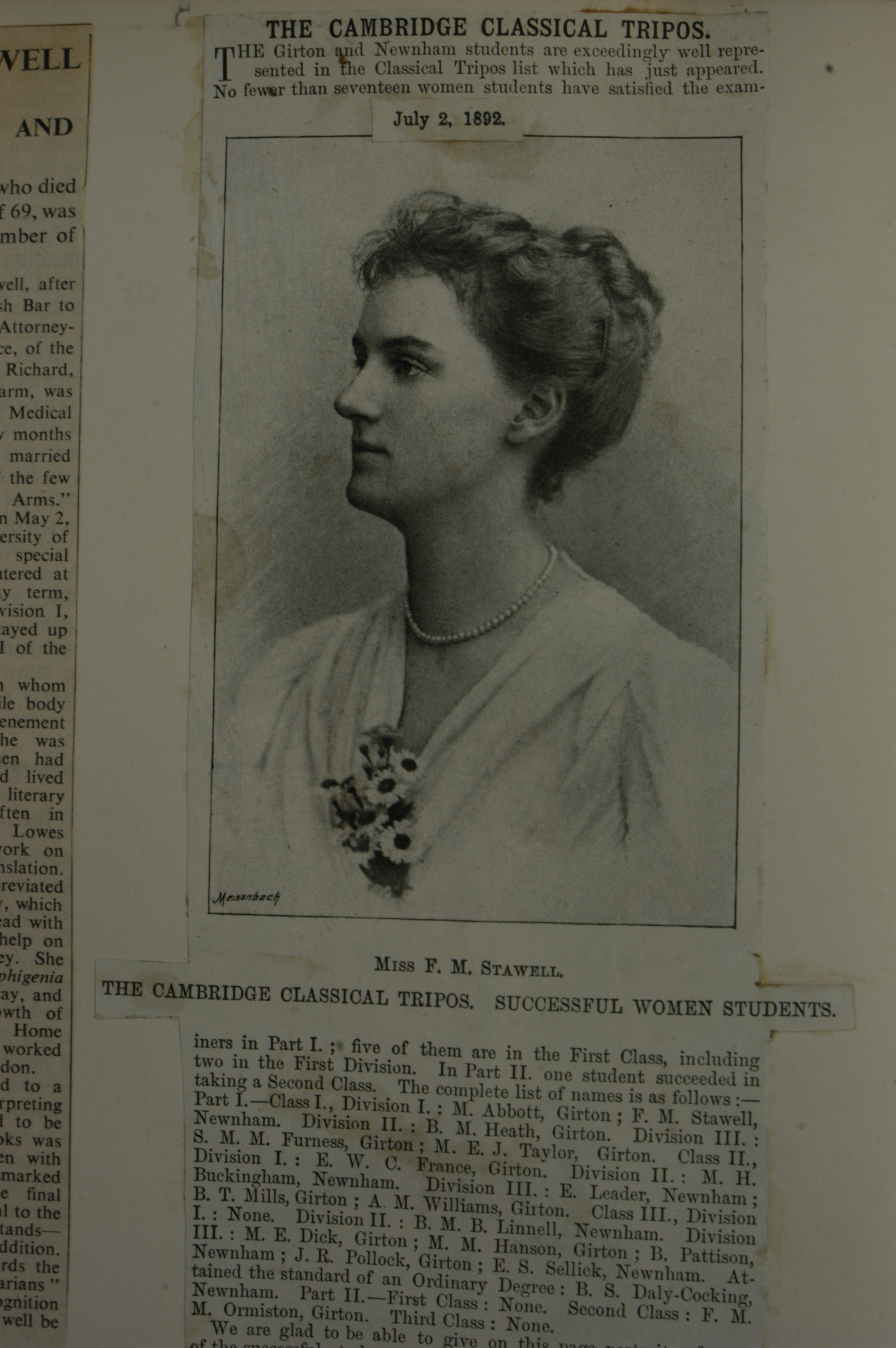
Newspaper photograph and Cambridge Classical Tripos results of Florence Stawell, 1892.

In 1886, Stawell became one of the first female residents at Trinity College, Melbourne. Studying classics, Stawell received individual instruction in Greek from Alexander Leeper. During this period, Stawell campaigned for the creation of a separate non-denominational women's college. In 1888, Stawell decided not to complete her degree and instead enrolled at Newnham College, Cambridge in May 1889. Accompanied by her parents and some of her siblings, Stawell's father died in Naples whilst en route to Cambridge.

Studying the classical tripos, Stawell played tennis for Newnham and volunteered in Barnwell as a adult literacy teacher. At Newnham met Clara "Clare" Reynolds (1865–1937) with whom she had a lifelong relationship. In 1882, Stawell became the third woman, and the first at Newnham, to be placed in the first division of the first class in part one of the Cambridge classical tripos. Studying German in Dresden for a few months, upon returning to Newnham Stawell studied philosophy but did not sit part two of the tripos. Returning to Melbourne for ten months, Stawell promoted female education and turned down a marriage proposal from Robert Hamilton Russell.

== Career ==
In October 1894, Stawell began a classics lectureship at Newnham however, she left the position within the first year due to ill health. Stawell moved to London in order to live with her mother.

In 1911, she offered an interpretation of the Phaistos Disc as Homeric Greek, syllabic writing. Stawell was a member of the Society for Psychical Research.

== Personal life ==
On 9 June 1936, Stawell died from cancer in Headington, Oxford aged 67. Stawell was buried at Headington Cemetery. Following Reynold's death seven months later, her ashes were scattered over Stawell's grave and the gravestone bears both their names.
