= Robert Hamilton Russell =

Australian surgeon (1860–1933)

Robert Hamilton Russell, FRCS, (3 September 1860 – 30 April 1933) was an English-born Australian surgeon, president of the Medical Society of Victoria from 1903.

== Early life ==
Russell was born at Farningham, Kent, England, the youngest son of James Russell, a farmer, and his wife Ellen, née Phillips. Russell was educated at Nassau school, Barnes, London, and then from 1878 at the medical school of King's College Hospital where he was a pupil of Joseph Lister's eventually becoming the last of the house surgeons who worked under his personal guidance. Russell took the diploma of M.R.C.S. in 1882 and, after experience as a house surgeon at King's College hospital, went to Shrewsbury for two years as resident surgeon at the Royal Salop Infirmary 1884–85. Russell then studied in Continental Europe before returning to England in 1889 suffering a lung condition (possibly tuberculosis), and became a fellow of the Royal College of Surgeons (London).

== Australia ==
Russell went to Australia for the benefit of his health, arriving in 1890 and established himself at Hawthorn a suburb of Melbourne, as a general practitioner. Here he became doctor to the Grainger family and commenced a lifelong friendship with Percy Grainger. Russell was, however, anxious to do surgical work and in 1892 was appointed a member of the honorary staff of the Royal Children's Hospital, Melbourne. Russell became particularly interested in the problem of inguinal hernia in the young and read a paper on this subject at the intercolonial medical congress at Brisbane in 1899. This and other papers on allied subjects were published in The Lancet in 1899 and 1900. In 1901 Russell was appointed to the honorary surgical staff of The Alfred Hospital, Melbourne. In 1903 Russell was elected president of the Medical Society of Victoria, his presidential address was an exposition on "The Congenital Origin of Hernia", given in January 1904. His reputation as a surgeon was now established, and his papers in medical journals were giving him worldwide recognition; some particularly important and original work dealt with the treatment of fractures. Russell was in England when World War I broke out and did valuable work both in France and England in the earlier years of it. On his return to Australia he took up his work again at the Alfred and Children's hospitals, but resigned his Alfred hospital appointment in 1920 and five years later retired from the children's hospital. In 1920 he founded the Victorian Association of Surgeons. After his retirement he retained his interest in surgery and particularly in the foundation of the Royal Australasian College of Surgeons at Melbourne. At the annual meeting of the fellows of that college in 1930 he was presented with his portrait by George Washington Lambert. He had been a member of the council from its inception, and at the time of his death was as censor-in-chief entrusted with the controlling of admissions to fellowship.

== Personal life ==
During the 1890s, Russell proposed to Melian Stawell, a classical scholar, internationalist campaigner, writer and the sister of his colleague Richard Rawdon Stawell, in Melbourne but the proposal was rejected.

In later years he suffered from osteoarthritis, became very lame, and was threatened with the loss of the sight of one of his eyes. This may have been a contributing cause of the accident by which he lost his life while driving a motor car on 30 April 1933. He never married, he was cremated and the remains returned to England.

== Legacy ==
Russell was well-spoken and urbane, he was also an excellent pianist and had an appreciation of the best music; Percy Grainger recollected him as 'the first exquisite pianist in my life'. Russell was a fine surgeon and a remarkable clinical teacher. Every case was made the subject of careful, accurate and complete study, and every student was trained to think on surgical lines, always with the proviso that the recovery of the patient was the important thing. As a student of Lister he believed in the importance of the dressing of the wounds, and to go the rounds with him while he explained the reason for each method of application was an education in itself. Russell was not a believer in complicated methods of surgery and was always seeking the simplest way. He earned the affection and admiration of all his students, and his great ability made him a member of the small band of Australian medical men whose influence has been felt outside his own country. There is a bust of Russell by Paul Montford at the Alfred hospital, and an intermediate hospital block attached to the Alfred hospital has been named Hamilton Russell House in his memory.
