= Knight & Kerr =

Knight & Kerr was a business partnership established in the 1850s between John George Knight and Peter Kerr. Their practice was important in the development of Melbourne as a city during the boom period led by the gold rush, providing the rapidly expanding state capital with many works of cultural and political significance. They were architects appointed with the responsibility for the design of noted public buildings in Melbourne, Australia; their most well known design being the Parliament House of Victoria. John Knight and Peter Kerr were also both members of The Royal British Institute of Architects.

== History ==
John George Knight was born in London in 1826. He studied as an architect but worked for and was trained by his father, engineer John Knight.

Peter Kerr, born in Aberdeen (Scotland) in 1820, worked with several architects such as Sir Charles Barry, known for his work on the Houses of Parliament at Westminster, before migrating to Australia.

Knight and Kerr both migrated to Australia in 1852. Knight first worked in the Public Works Department and soon after, along with Kerr, joined Thomas Kemp's private practice until 1855, when Kemp returned to England. However, Knight & Kerr still continued their working relationship as partners and continued to design buildings such as Parliament House, D’Estaville and the Hebrew Congregational School.

The partnership was continued until around 1860 where Knight ventured out of architecture and Kerr went back to working in the Public Works Department. Knight took part in assisting the Victorian Exhibition in 1861 until 1866 where he became secretary for the Victorian division. In between, around 1865, Knight was selected as a lecturer in civil engineering at the University of Melbourne before migrating to the goldfields in the Northern Territory in the 1870s. From there he worked his way up from Chief Warden of the Goldfields, to Stipendiary Magistrate and then becoming Government Resident of Palmerston in 1890. He died there two years after.

Peter Kerr continued with the design of public buildings in Melbourne, such as the Law Courts, Government House, Post Office and Customs House. Shortly before his death in South Melbourne in 1912, Kerr also designed the extension of parliamentary buildings, Queen's Hall and the Vestibule which opened in 1879.

== Projects ==
=== Parliament House (1855-1888) ===
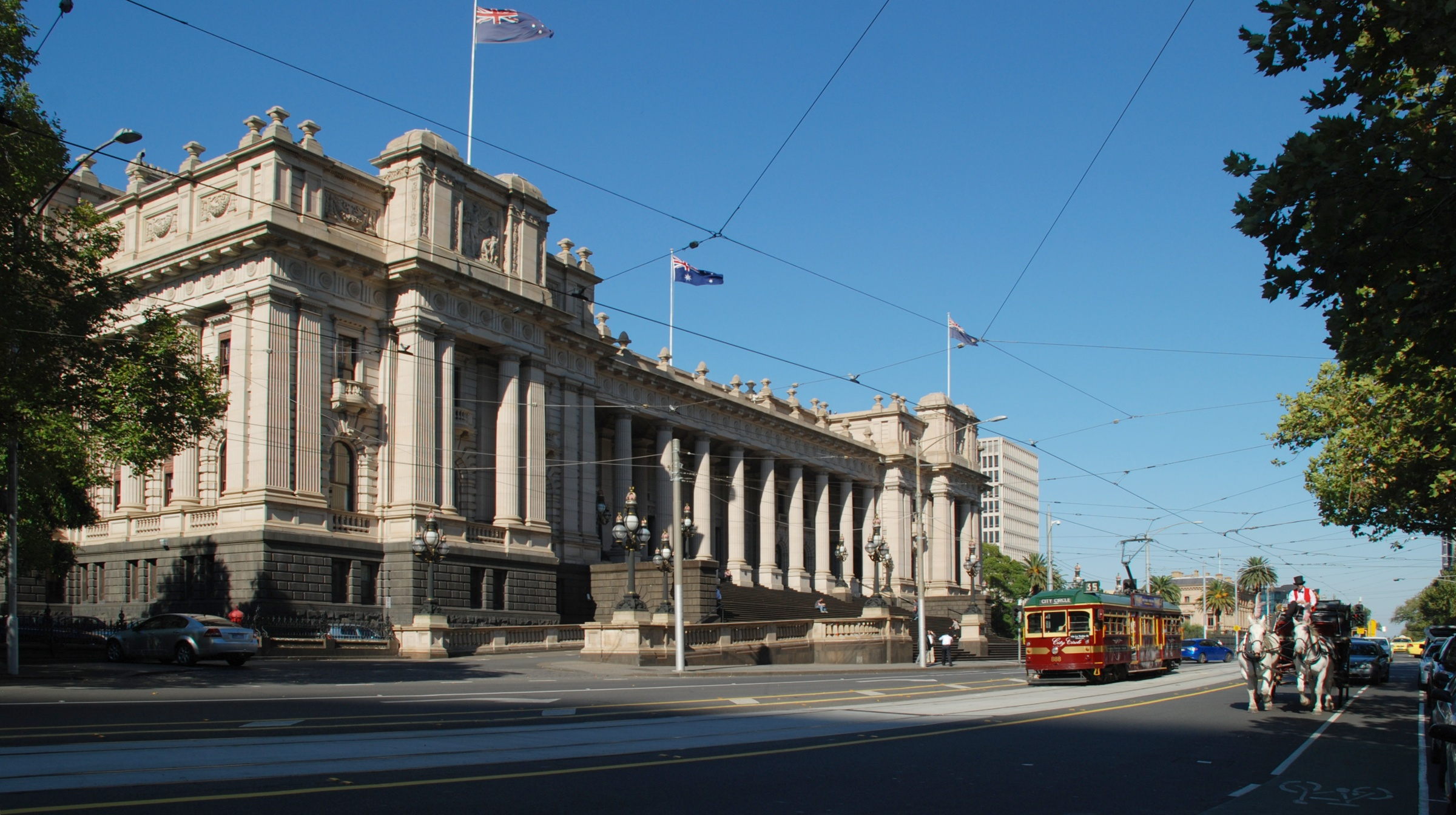
Parliament House along Spring Street in Melbourne CBD

Parliament House is one of Melbourne's best-known buildings of great public importance. It served as Australia's Federal until the early 20th Century before the construction of the Temporary Parliament House in Canberra in 1927.

Parliament House is a Classical Roman Revival construction in the Doric order and references a Roman Forum emulated through its placement upon a stepped pedestal. Colonial Engineer, Charles Pasley, was originally responsible for the building of Parliament House. However, in 1856, the task was reassigned to two architects in his office, Peter Kerr and John George Knight.

Knight and Kerr planned the construction of Parliament House in stages by beginning in 1856 with the Legislative Chambers; two unconnected bluestone buildings rising three stories high on a site intersecting Spring and Bourke St, the high-ground and 'top' of Melbourne's CBD grid.

Construction of the Library was completed in 1860. This sandstone erection connected the two previous buildings in a 'U' shape, with the Library at the rear of the composition facing St Patrick's Cathedral. Further construction works were halted until 1876, when a Parliamentary select committee decided to continue work on the building. From 1877 to 1879 the Queen's Hall (named after Queen Victoria) and the vestibule created a formal entry, reception and banquet hall in the space between the Legislative Chambers and the tiled mosaic floor, which is inscribed with a passage from the Bible's Proverbs 11:14: 'Where no counsel is the people fall; but in the multitude of counsellors there is safety'.

The last built component of Parliament house was completed in 1888, albeit with significant alterations. A 20-storey dome was initially planned to complement the featured grand colonnaded entrance on the Spring St façade, but the completed stage did away with the dome portion regarding problems involving poor quality masonry resulting from economic concerns of the time.

=== D’Estaville (1859) ===
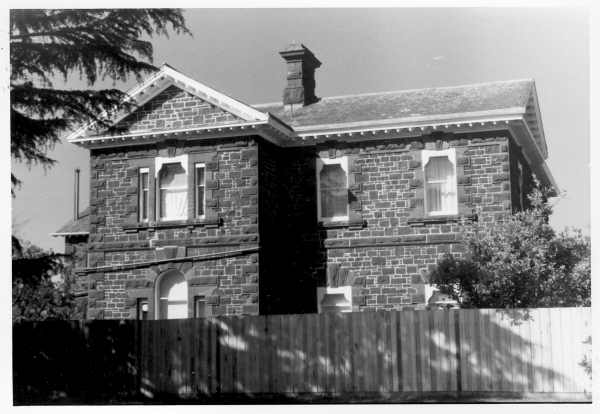
D'Estaville, Kew

In 1859 Knight and Kerr were contracted to build the D'Estaville homestead for Sir William Stawell, Victoria's first Attorney General and later Chief Justice of the Colony. This mansion is a double storey bluestone building constructed from exposed Footscray basalt and features a broken pedimented portico and 14 rooms. D’Estaville significantly emulates the Italianate-style, yet lacks the signature Italianate tower. However, it still is regarded as an excellent example of Knight and Kerr's Classical Revival style.

=== Num Pon Soon (1860-1861) ===
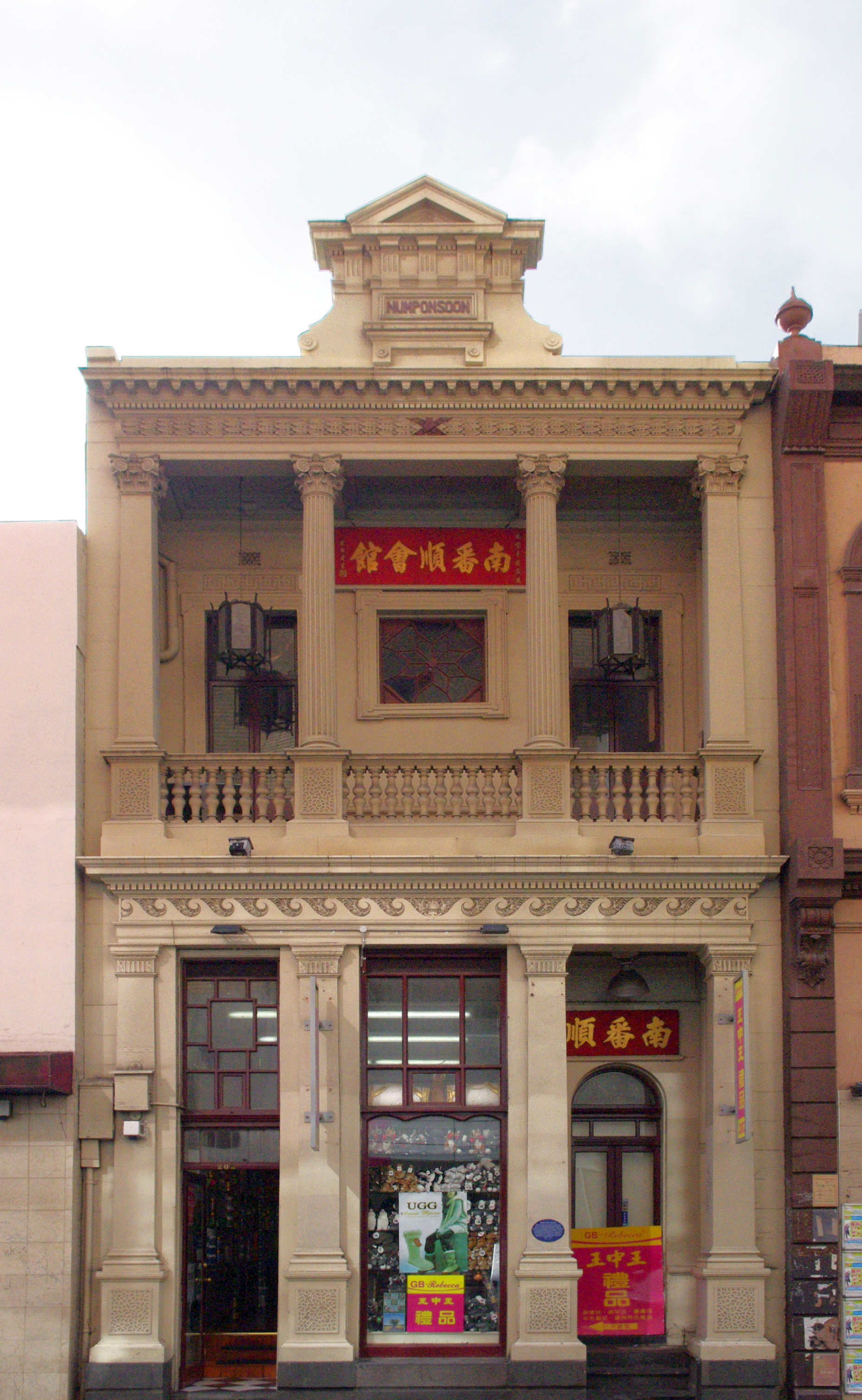
Num Pon Soon, Melbourne

Num Pon Soon is located at 200-202 Little Bourke Street, right in the heart of Melbourne's China Town. The name is connected with the influx of Chinese immigrants from Namhoi, Poonyee and Soondak provinces.

This former clubhouse is a two-storey Classical-style building constructed with fluted columns of the Corinthian order. The original design featured colonnades on both levels where the lower set has now been infilled.

Nom Pon Soon is noted for its uncommon combination of Chinese inspired windows and lanterns on the ground floor which have been combined with the traditional Classical order.

=== Customs House (1856-1858, partly built) ===
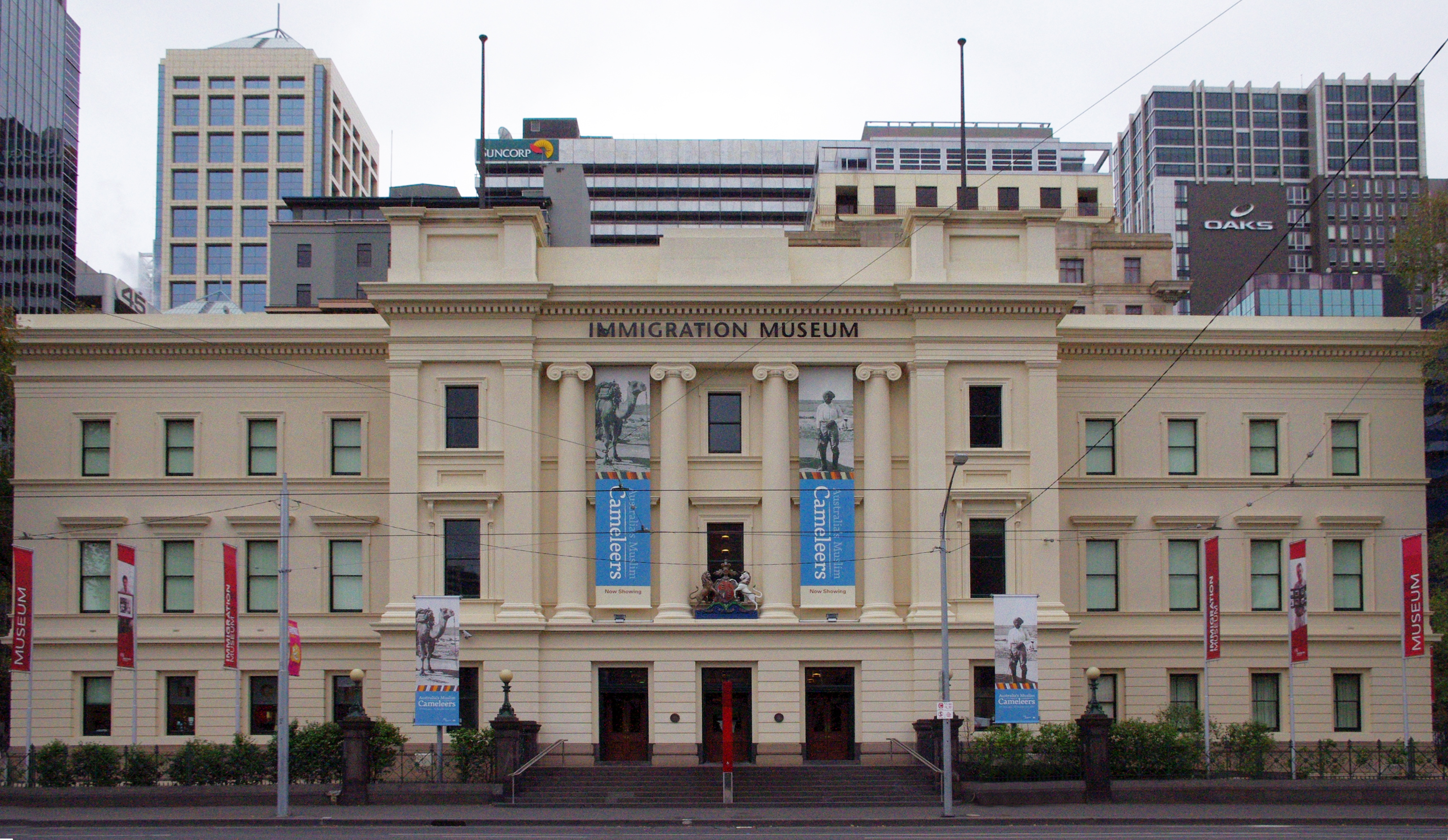
Old Customs House in Melbourne

The former Customs House, now the Melbourne Immigration Museum, is located along Flinders Street between William and Market Streets. Knight and Kerr designed a grand Neoclassical replacement for the earlier 1841 building in 1856, but construction stopped in 1858 with about two-thirds of main body and only the outline of the central portico complete. A new design to complete the building was prepared by JJ Clark, replacing the portico with a projecting columned bay, built between 1873 and 1876.

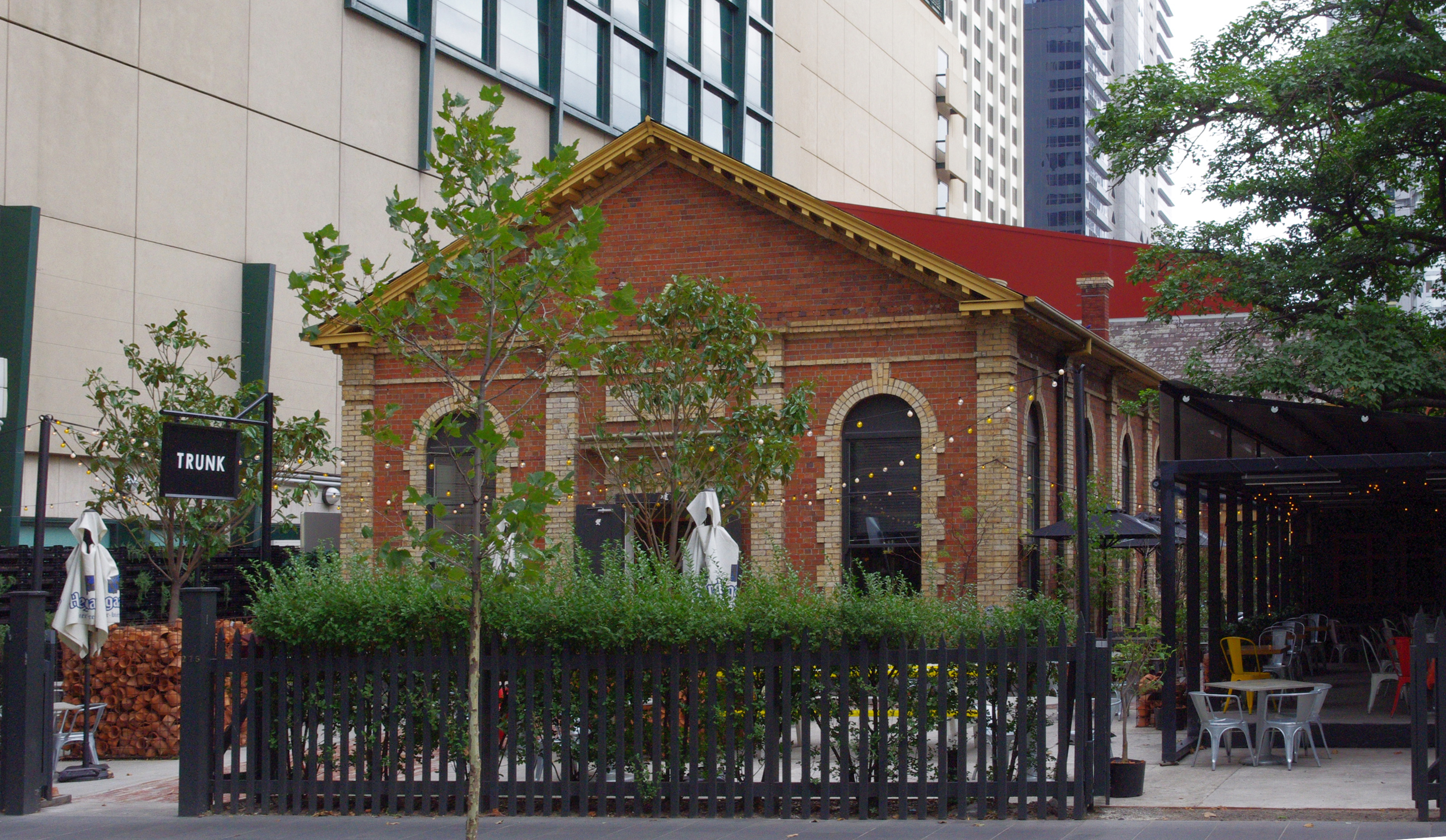
Former Hebrew Congregational School and Mickyeh Yisrael Synagogue in Melbourne

=== Hebrew Congregational School (1859) ===
The Victorian Heritage site of the former Hebrew Congregational School and Mikveh Yisrael Synagogue can be found on the corner of Exhibition and Lonsdale Street, right in Melbourne's CBD.

Construction of one of Melbourne's oldest synagogues began in 1859 with the result being a simple single storey structure that was built upon a basalt plinth complemented by elaborate masonry work, arched windows and pedimented gables.

The majority of the original smaller buildings no longer exist around the site and so the Synagogue has a prominence in its location. Further attention to this heritage site comes from Knight and Kerr's unusual application of the Classical style on no less a small-scaled building; a period in which their works involved more elaborate structures such as Parliament House.
