= D'Estaville =

Heritage-listed house in Melbourne, Victoria, Australia

d'Estaville
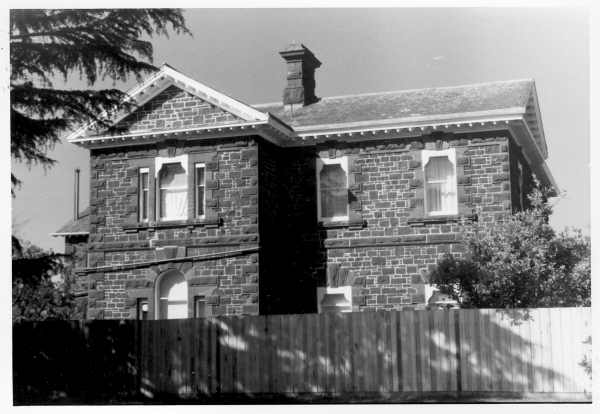
- The house in 1984.

- Location of the house in greater metropolitan Melbourne

General information
- Status: Completed
- Type: House / Mansion
- Architectural style: Victorian Italianate; Victorian Classical Revival
- Location: 7 Barry Street, Kew, Melbourne, Victoria, Australia
- Coordinates: 37°48′14″S 145°01′35″E
- Completed: 1859; 167 years ago
- Renovated: 2020
- Client: Sir William Foster Stawell

Technical details
- Material: Bluestone; slate
- Floor count: 2
- Grounds: 2,560 m^{2} (27,600 sq ft) (2016)

Design and construction
- Architecture firm: Knight & Kerr

Renovating team
- Renovating firm: NTF Architecture
- Other designers: Nigel Lewis; Eckersley Garden Architecture
- Main contractor: MGS Construction
- Awards: Heritage Commendation: RAIA Victoria (2021)

Victorian Heritage Register
- Official name: d’Estaville
- Type: Registered place
- Delisted: 9 October 1974
- Reference no.: VHR H0201
- Heritage overlay no.: HO11
- Category: Residential buildings (private)

Register of the National Estate
- Official name: D’Estaville
- Type: Defunct register
- Designated: 21 October 1980
- Reference no.: 5676

d’Estaville, also spelled D’Estaville, is a house located at 7 Barry Street in Kew, an inner eastern suburb of Melbourne, in Victoria, Australia.

Built in 1859 on the traditional lands of the Wurundjeri people, the house was added to the Victorian Heritage Register on 9 October 1974 in recognition of its historical and architectural significance; and was also added to non-statutory lists by the Victorian branch of the National Trust on 25 May 1961 and the now defunct Register of the National Estate on an 21 October 1980.

== History ==
d’Estaville was completed in 1859 for Sir William Foster Stawell, that allowed him to gain the necessary qualification to stand for the Victorian Legislative Assembly. Stawell became the first Attorney-General of Victoria and later served as Chief Justice of the Colony. Stawell was also involved in the establishment and management of the Public Library, the Victorian Deaf and Dumb Institute, the Melbourne Hospital, the Benevolent Asylum and The University of Melbourne. D'Estaville was designed by prominent colonial architects Knight and Kerr in the Victorian Italianate Classical Revival style. d’Estaville is the only residential work of Knight & Kerr, designers of the Victorian Parliament House.

In 1888, with failing health, Stawell subdivided and sold land from the 13-hectare (32-acre) property then known as the d’Estaville Estate along Princess Street, and a land company subdivided the remainder of the estate, which failed to sell, so the house and the steeply sloping land to the river stayed with the family until subdivided and sold in 1904.

Through its years, the building has seen different renovations and extensions from many owners that have been added to the structure, including a faux Victorian addition in the 1990s. In 2016, set on 2,560 square metres (27,600 sq ft) with contemporary improvements, the five-bedroom house was listed for sale; and sold in May 2018 for A$10 million. The house was subsequently extensively renovated with contemporary interior styling, guided by a heritage architect and was awarded a Heritage Commendation by the Victorian Chapter of the Australian Institute of Architects in 2021.

== Description ==
The large bluestone Italianate-style house incorporates restrained classical details in the finely bracketed eaves and imposing pedimented portico. It is a fine and unusual example of the Italianate style and is one of the few Melbourne mansions built out of bluestone. The two-storey Anglo-Italian villa features a slightly asymmetrical massing of thick bluestone with classical details. The Italianate style was also part of the romantic and picturesque movement. The style expressed a desire for greater freedom of architectural expression and for more organic and complicated forms. The aesthetic value derives from the highly refined stone work of the entry portico and rock faced quoins that surround the windows and corner walls.

The corners and windows of the house are constructed of bluestone blocks that have axed corners and their centres have a rock face. The other parts of the bluestone walls are coursed squared rubble. The house has a series of low pitched roofs, formed out of a series of truss-like members and clad with slate. Cornice with decorative trapezoidal brackets shows its classical heritage. Holes are cut into the eaves in the shape of diamonds and eight pointed stars for decoration. Double-hung windows with curved segmental arches over them are used on the ground and upper floors of the original design. The only exceptions are the large Serlian window to the western elevation and the tripartite window above it. The service area of the building has narrower windows. These windows are divided into six by glazing bars. d’Estaville lacks the cupola, a square tower with bracketed cornices, which was generally a common feature of Italianate-style architecture.

== See also ==
- Architecture of Melbourne
- List of places on the Victorian Heritage Register in the City of Boroondara
