= Parliament House, Melbourne =

House of parliament for the State of Victoria, Australia

Parliament House
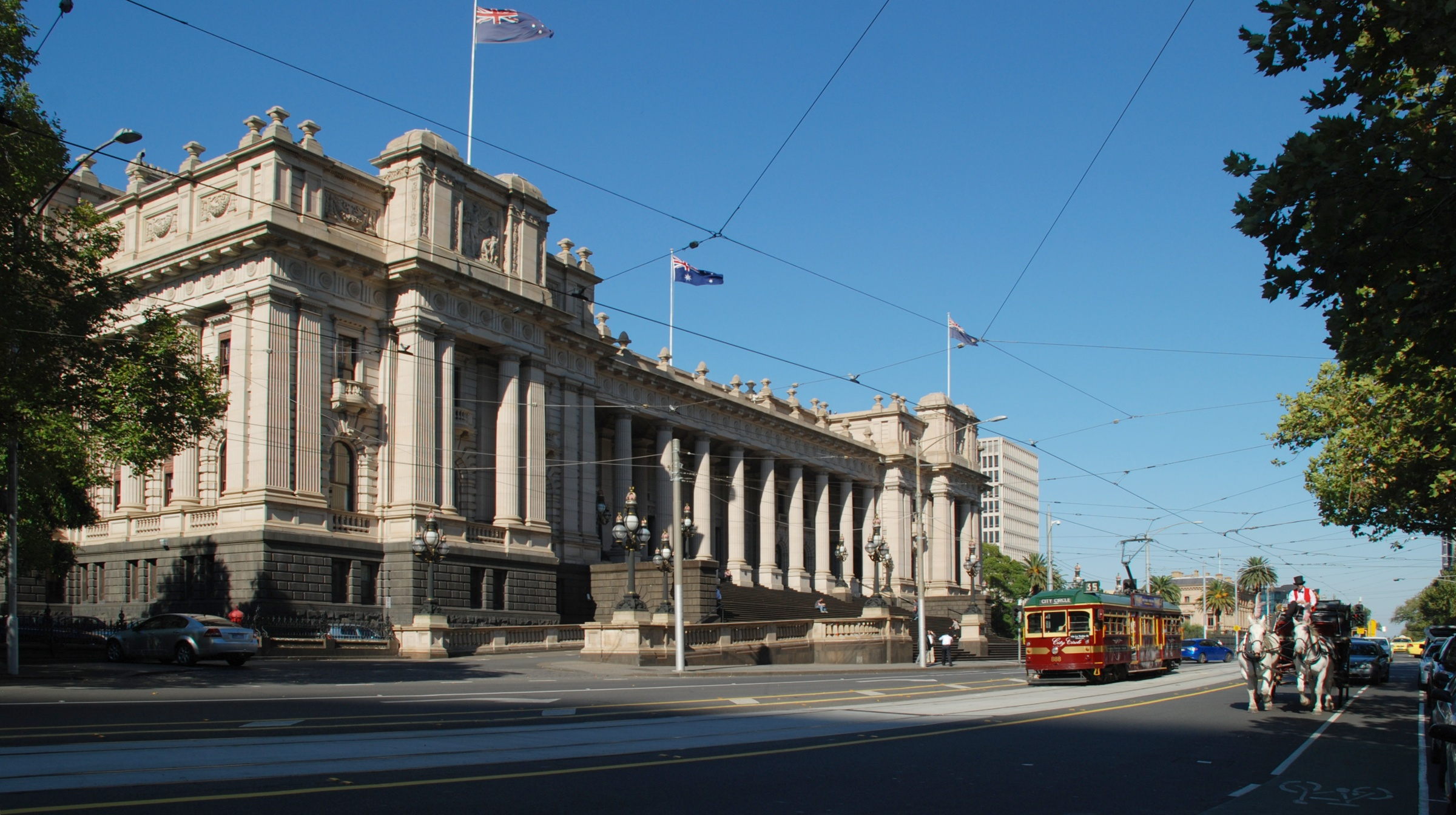
- Parliament House in 2010

General information
- Type: Parliament
- Architectural style: Neoclassical
- Location: Victoria, Spring Street, East Melbourne, Australia
- Coordinates: 37.811055°S 144.97329°E
- Current tenants: Government of Victoria
- Construction started: 1855; 171 years ago
- Completed: Never
- Opened: 1856; 170 years ago

Design and construction
- Architects: Knight & Kerr & Peter Kerr
- Engineer: John George Knight
- Designations: Victorian Heritage Register

Other information
- Public transit: Parliament Bourke St/Spring St (#0) 35 Spring St/Bourke St (#9): 86, 96

Website
- www.parliament.vic.gov.au

Victorian Heritage Register
- Official name: Parliament House (Including Grounds, Works and Fences)
- Type: State Registered Place
- Designated: August 20, 1982; 44 years ago
- Reference no.: H1722
- Heritage Overlay number: HO175

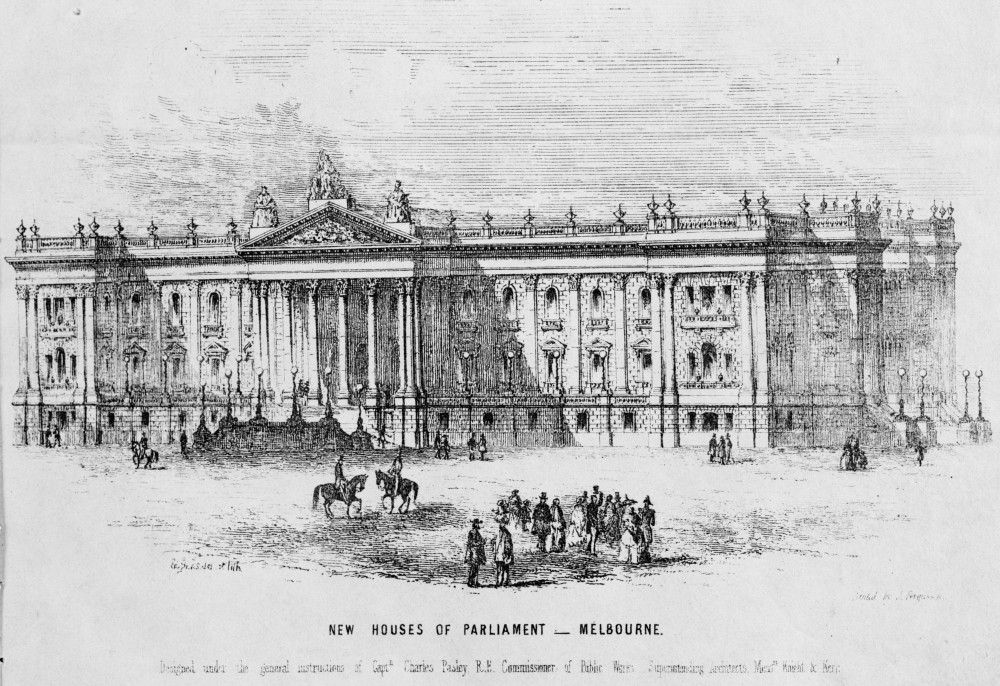
1854 design by Knight & Kerr with Captain Pasley

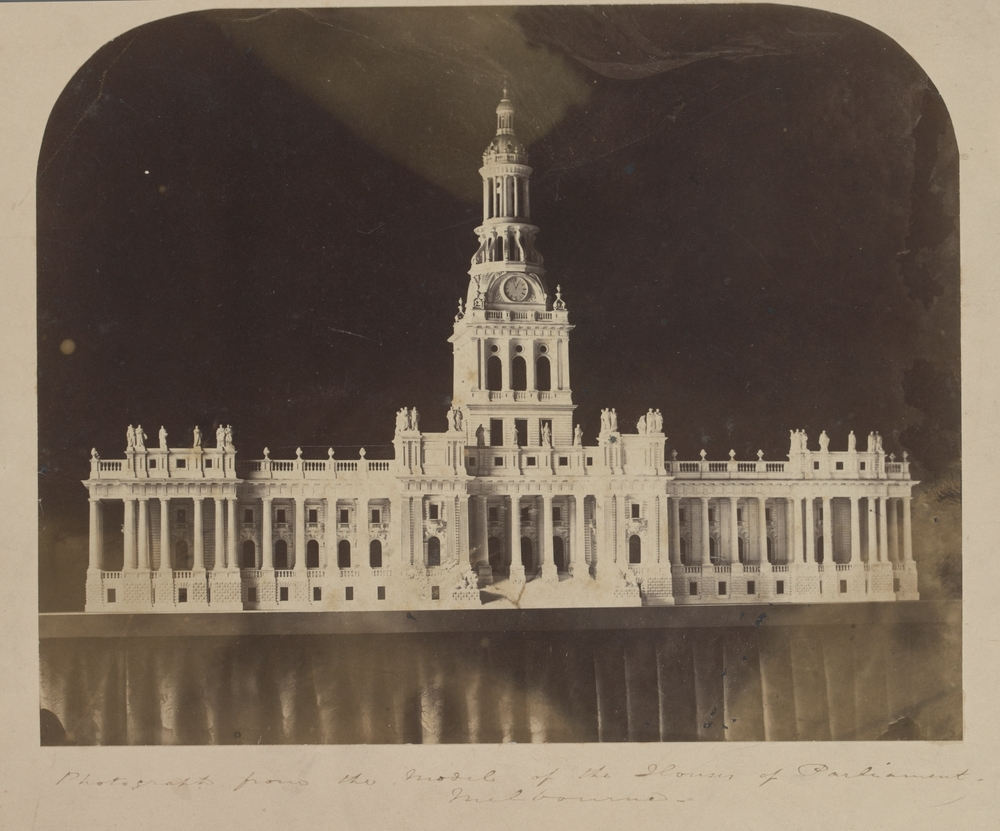
Model of 1855 design by Knight & Kerr

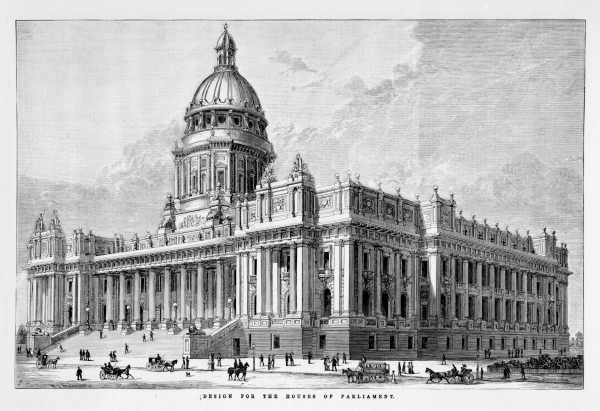
1877 design for west front and dome, by Peter Kerr

Parliament House is the meeting place of the Parliament of Victoria, one of the eight parliaments of the Australian states and territories.

Located on Spring Street on the edge of the Hoddle Grid, the grand colonnaded front dominates the vista up Bourke Street. Construction began in 1855, and the first stage was officially opened the following year, with various sections completed over the following decades; it has never been completed, and the planned dome is one of the most well known unbuilt features of Melbourne. Between 1901 and 1927, it served as the meeting place of the Parliament of Australia, during the period when Melbourne was the temporary national capital. The building is listed on the Victorian Heritage Register.

== Background ==
=== Site ===
The Victorian gold rush and population boom led calls for greater democracy and a home for political debate in Victoria. Prior to the Colony of Victoria acquiring self-government in 1851, Governor Charles La Trobe instructed Surveyor General Robert Hoddle to select a site for the colony's new parliament to meet. Hoddle selected a site on the eastern hill at the top of Bourke Street, which commanded a view over the entire city. It was not until April 1854 that Eastern Hill, the current Spring Street site, was formally agreed to due to ongoing disagreements over the best location.

=== Design ===
The exact sequence of events is unclear, with a number of architects and designs chosen and rejected in succession, with the final result possibly based on earlier work. The first design appeared as early as 1851 by then Colonial Architect Henry Ginn; however, the Legislative Council then decided to have a competition in 1853, which Ginn took as a slight and resigned. A design by Smith & Pritchard won first prize, but this was soon set aside as well. The Colony's newly arrived Chief Engineer (from Nov 1855 Commissioner of Public Works) Captain Pasley was asked to prepare a design by April 1854, possibly for a unicameral building, which may have been soon reworked into one for a bi-cameral Parliament, which had just been decided upon. A design was published in c1854 showing a restrained Palladian building much like the then recently started State Library of Victoria; this design was credited to Knight & Kerr "under the general directions of Captain Pasley". John Knight and Peter Kerr had just formed a partnership, and Knight may possibly still have been an architect within the Public Works Department at this time, while also practicing privately. This design was also apparently deemed unsuitable, and Knight & Kerr were employed separately to create a much grander design by 1855, which was perhaps mainly a reworking of the 1854 design. This design is extraordinarily impressive and elaborate for a fledgling colony, albeit one flush with the results of the recent gold rush. It featured a columned screen on at least three sides, with end and central bays set forward, statuary atop the cornice, grand stairs, and a tall multi-stage columned and domed tower. Images of this design were also published, and photographs exist of a model of the scheme. Knight & Kerr are credited with the design of the first stages of Parliament House when construction commenced in 1855.

== Construction and completion ==
=== Chambers: 1855–1856 ===
It was decided to construct the building in stages, owing to its vast size and cost, so construction began in December 1855 on only the two chambers, one for the Victorian Legislative Assembly and a smaller more ornate chamber for the Victorian Legislative Council. Construction progressed rapidly and on 25 November 1856, the first session of the Victorian Government in the new chambers was opened, to great acclaim.

=== Library and Eastern Wing: 1858–1860 ===
Construction of the Library and eastern wing began in 1858 and was completed in 1860. There was much debate about an appropriate stone for the exterior, with a desire to use stone from Victoria, though none could be found that were known to be entirely suitable. Bluestone was rejected as too dark and sombre, local granite as too expensive, even Carrara marble was considered, but freestone from Bacchus Marsh was chosen. This proved to decay rapidly and large parts had to be replaced with stone from Tasmania within a few years. With the library complete, the two legislative chambers were joined at the rear, resulting in a `U-shaped' building. The classical architectural detail of the east facade were noted as the first expression of Peter Kerr's vision for the building. No further construction took place for 18 years; however, the first set of electrical bells used to call members to divisions were installed circa 1877.

=== Queen's Hall, Vestibule and Proposed Dome: 1879–1882 ===
In 1876 a Royal Commission was formed to recommend the next steps. It tabled several changes, including the addition of a large dome, and the appointment of Peter Kerr as leading architect, and a resumption of construction. Kerr produced new plans for the completion of the building in 1877, replacing the tower with a dome, and replacing the complex external architecture with a simpler design dominated by a long colonnade. This is the design that is widely known and referred to as the 'original' design.

Though a radical simplification of the 1855 design, the main facade bears a strong similarity to Leeds Town Hall, designed 1853, and completed 1858, which is somewhat smaller and less elaborate. The dome however is quite different to Leeds’ square columned tower, which is however similar to the 1855 Melbourne tower, designed about the time a tower was added to the Leeds Town Hall design.

The Great Hall (renamed Queen's Hall in 1887) and vestibule were completed in 1879, with the Commission continuing to produce reports on the progress. Their report of 1878 noted the progress on the construction of the Queens Hall and Vestibule (up to the base of the proposed dome), and that there was still no agreement on a suitable stone for the exterior.

Queen's Hall was used for formal receptions and banquets, while the Vestibule offered a formal entry to Parliament House, though the grand front steps were not to be completed for another decade.

=== West Front and Stairs 1881–1891 ===
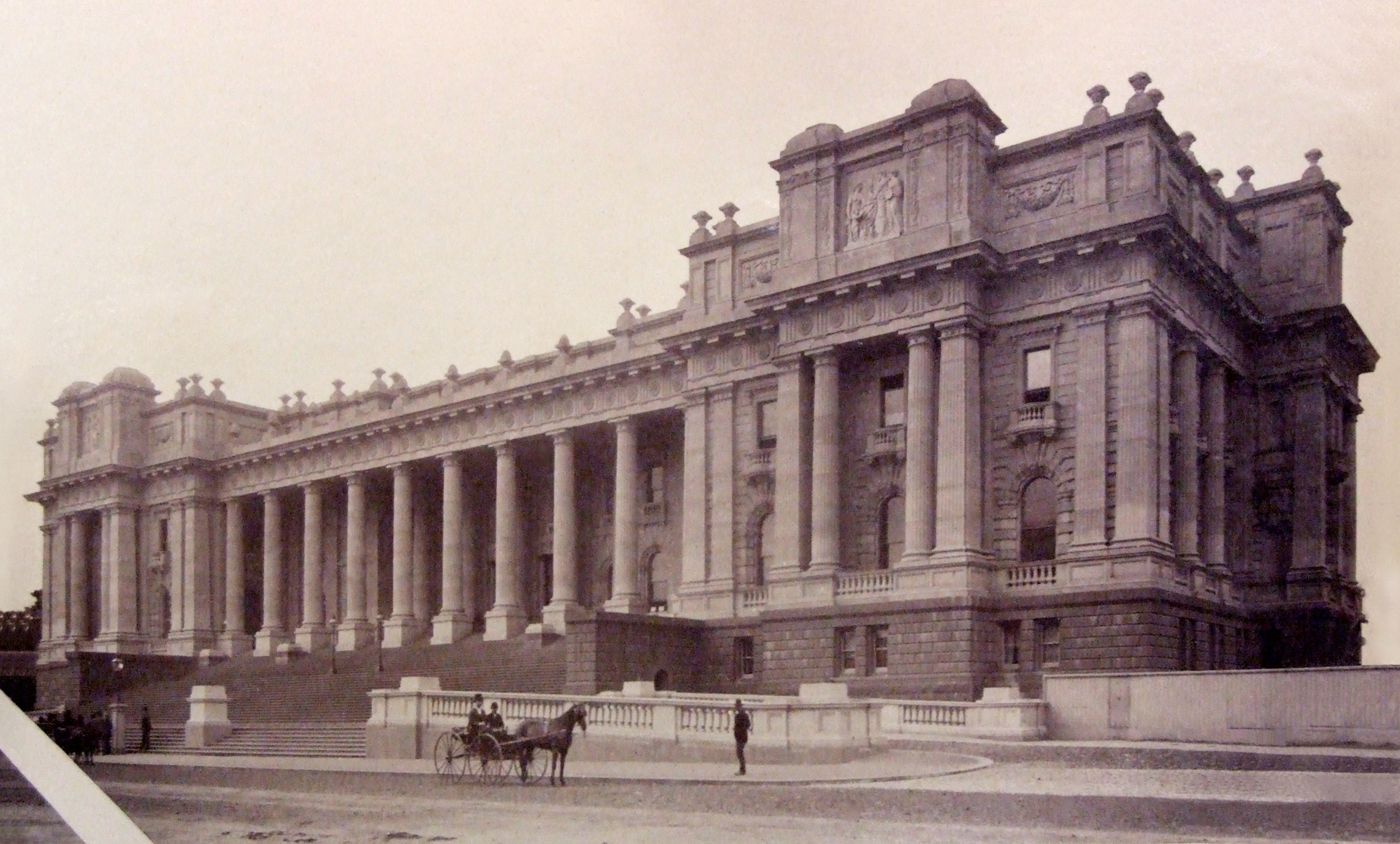
Parliament House, Melbourne, 1890, after completion of the west front and before the installation of the lamps.

Planning for the construction of the grand classical colonnaded front of the building facing Bourke Street as envisaged in the 1877 plan was to follow on immediately after the completion of the previous section, but construction was delayed by the ongoing desire to find a suitable Victorian stone for the exterior. Work in interiors progressed, with the imported Minton tiled floor of the Vestibule laid in 1888, spelling out a quote from Proverbs 11:14: "Where no Counsel is the People Fall; but in the Multitude of Counsellors there is Safety". Eventually sandstone from Mt Difficult in the Grampians National Park was decided upon, and a quarry was opened up. The colonnade with the grand front entry stairs was completed in 1889, and final interior decoration was completed in 1890. Final elements like the ornate wrought-iron fence around the grounds and the elaborate cast-iron lamps and the bronze lions of the entry stairs were completed over the next year. A contract for the north wing was let in 1890, with the dome to follow, but the boom years of the 1880s were over, and the subsequent economic depression of the 1890s meant no further work was started.

=== Refreshment Rooms 1927–1929 ===
After the Federal Parliament relocated to Canberra in 1927, the Federal Government paid for the last major addition, the refreshment rooms occupying the northeast corner. The exterior followed the 1877 design, and it was completed in 1929.

== Temporary home of Federal Parliament ==
From 1901 to 1927, Parliament House was the first home of the Commonwealth of Australia's Federal Government, since the new capital city envisaged in the Australian Constitution did not yet exist and there were long delays in finding a site and commencing construction. During these years the Victorian Parliament met in the Royal Exhibition Building in Carlton.

Many of the major events of the early federal period took place in this building, including the formation of the Federal Parliamentary Australian Labor Party, the "fusion" of the Free Trade Party and the Protectionist Party into the first Liberal Party in 1909, the declaration of the Great War in 1914, and the split in the Labor Party over conscription in 1916.

== Modern use and developments ==
The building resumed its original use as the Victorian Parliament chambers in 1928. Parliament House was then listed on the Victorian Heritage Register in 1982 and celebrated its 150th anniversary in 2005–6.

Several modern governments have expressed interest in completing Pasley and Kerr's original design by constructing the dome but were deterred by the substantial cost. Notably, the 1992 Kennett government established a committee to examine building the dome. Kennett and the then Opposition Leader John Brumby reached an agreement in 1996 for the building to be completed by the turn of the century. The idea was then abandoned by Kennett when he learned the original site of the sandstone mined for the building, now within Grampians National Park, could not be re-mined.

From 2016 to 2018, a $40 million two-storey office building was constructed in the gardens of Parliament House for MPs' use. The building is embedded into the landscape to specifically reduce its impact on Parliament House and other nearby buildings. The new building is called the Members Annexe and contains 102 offices for members of the Parliament of Victoria. The building was designed by Peter Elliott Architecture and Urban Design. The annexe is deliberately sunk to preserve the view of Parliament House. Its pincer shape ensures quick access for members to return to the legislative chambers within four minutes when votes are called.

The stairs on the west front of Parliament House are frequently used by protestors and activists to draw attention to contentious issues. Notable protests that used the stairs as a gathering point and podium for speeches include the 2020 Black Lives Matter protest and several anti-lockdown protests during the COVID-19 pandemic, While individuals or groups are not required to obtain permission from the City of Melbourne to hold a protest on the stairs of Parliament House, the City of Melbourne encourages notifying Victoria Police of planned activities in advance.

== Gallery ==
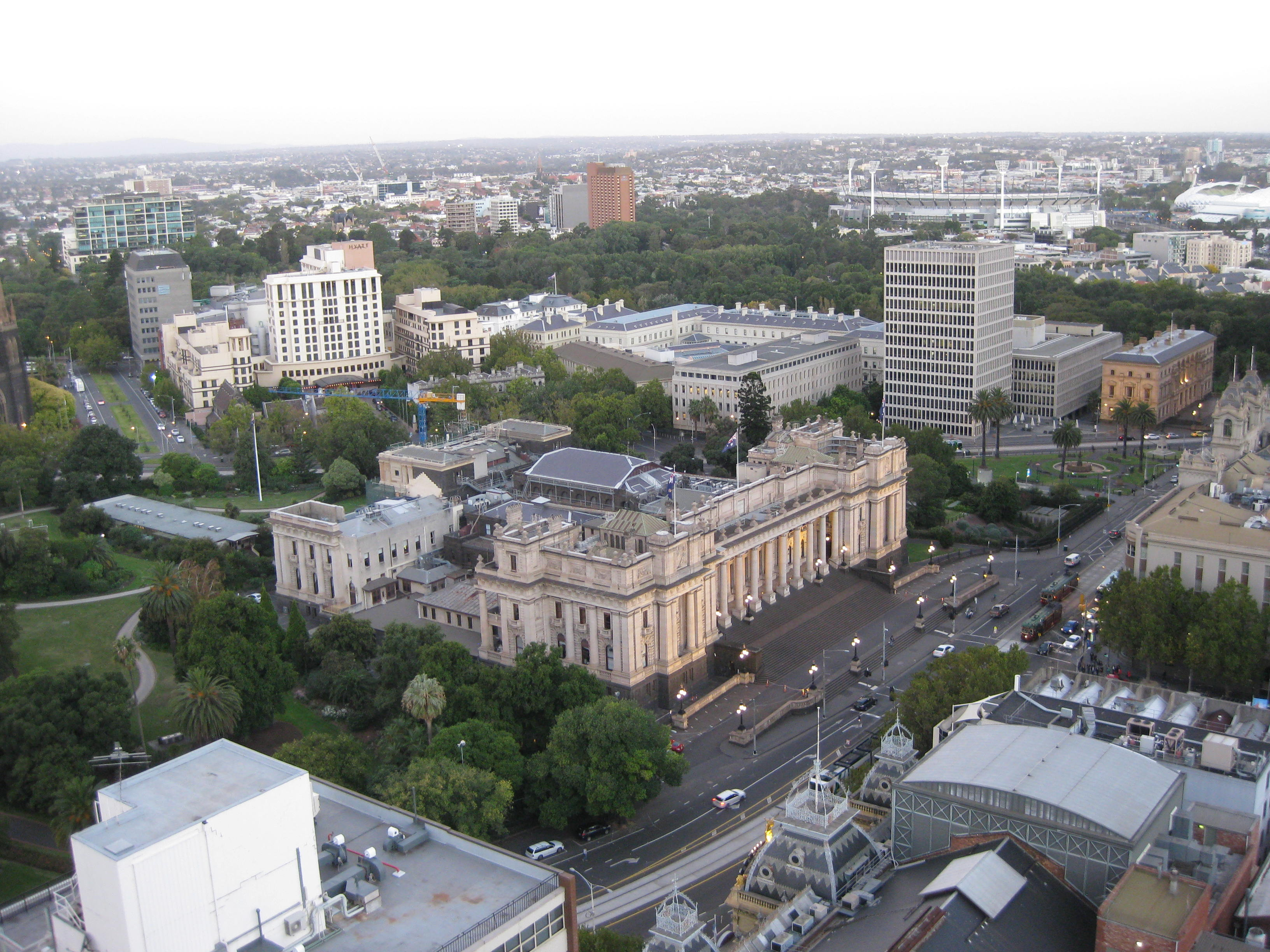
Victorian Parliament and surrounding area

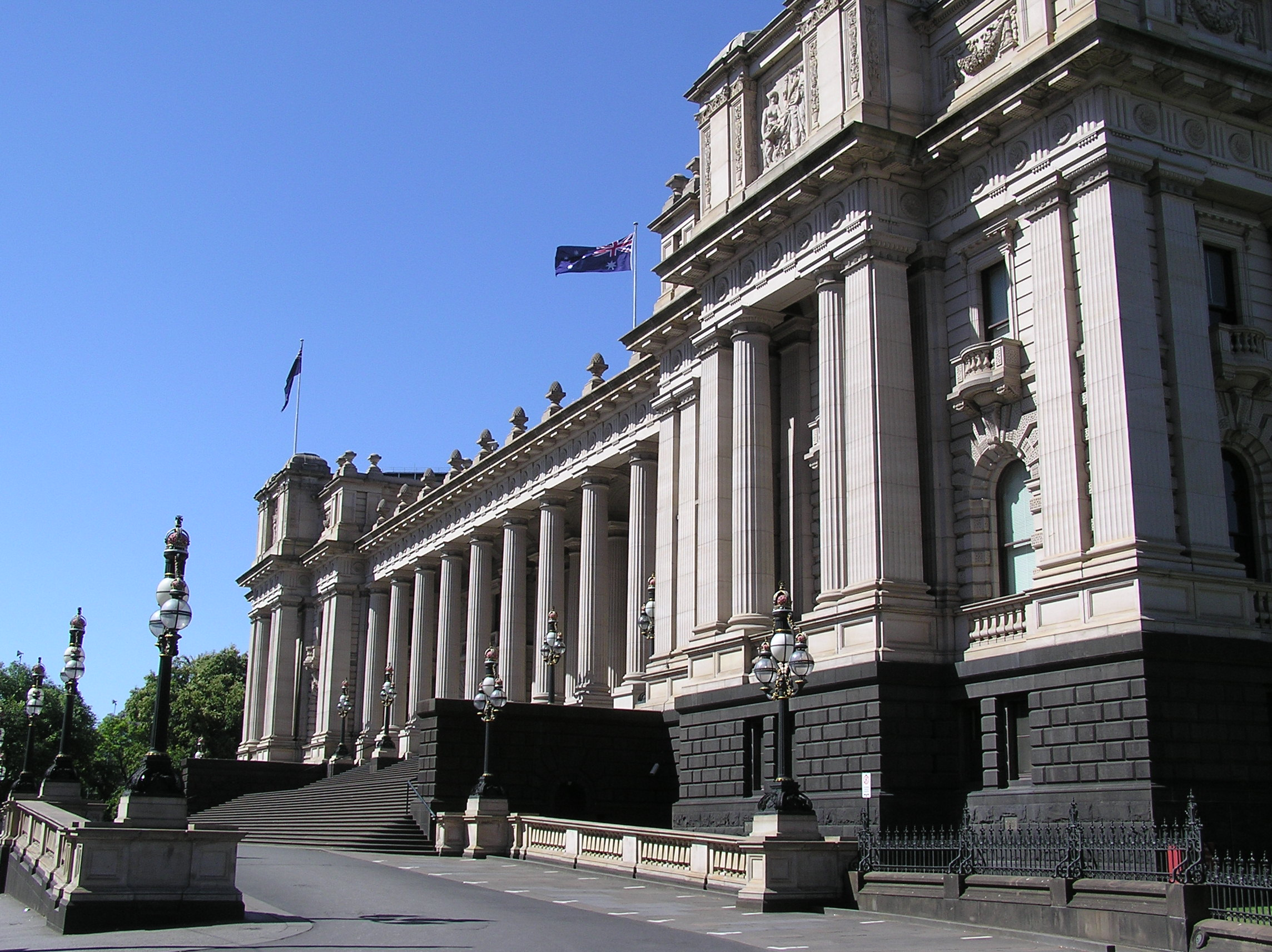
Victoria Parliament from Spring Street

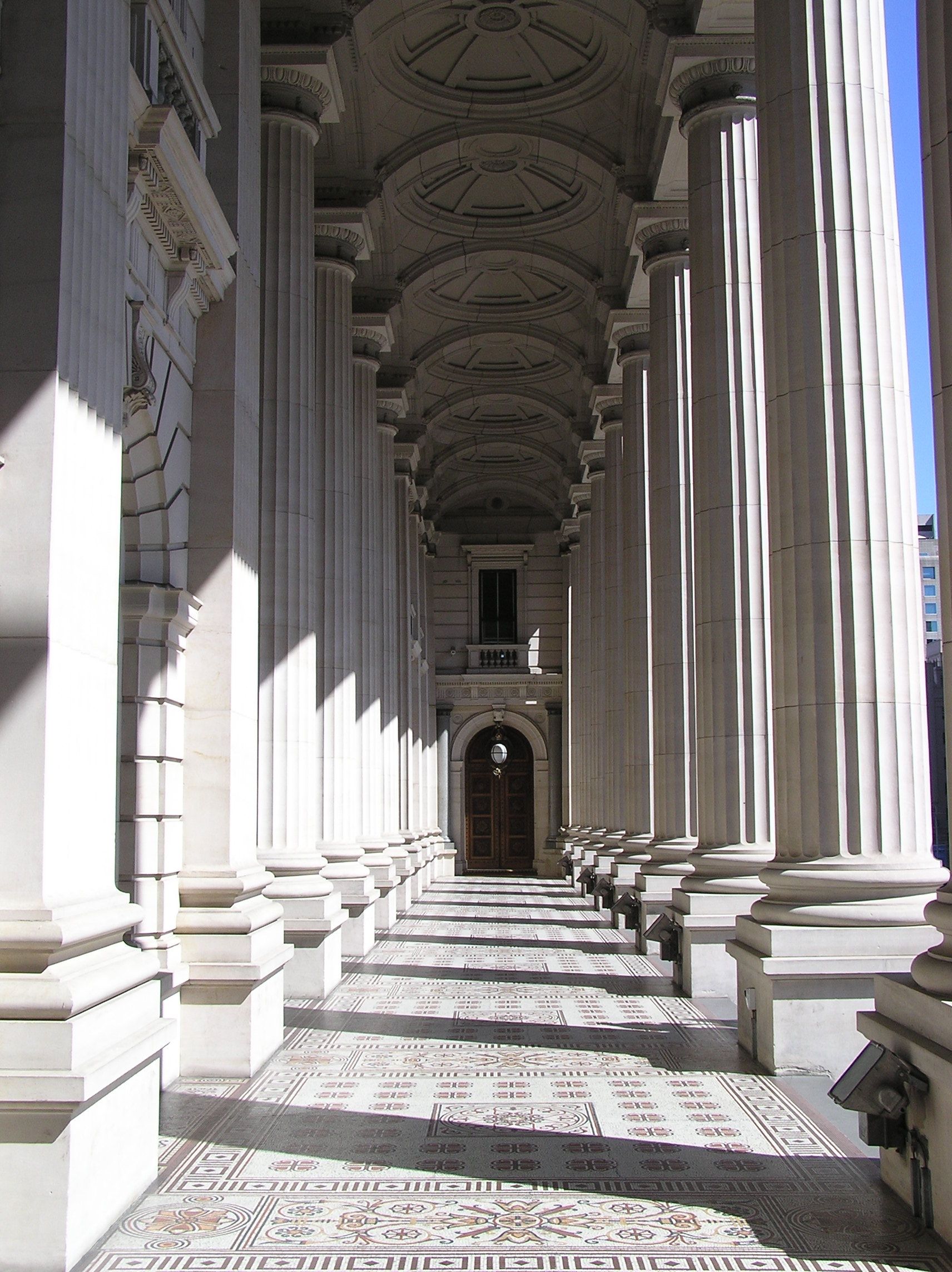
Colonnade and Portico

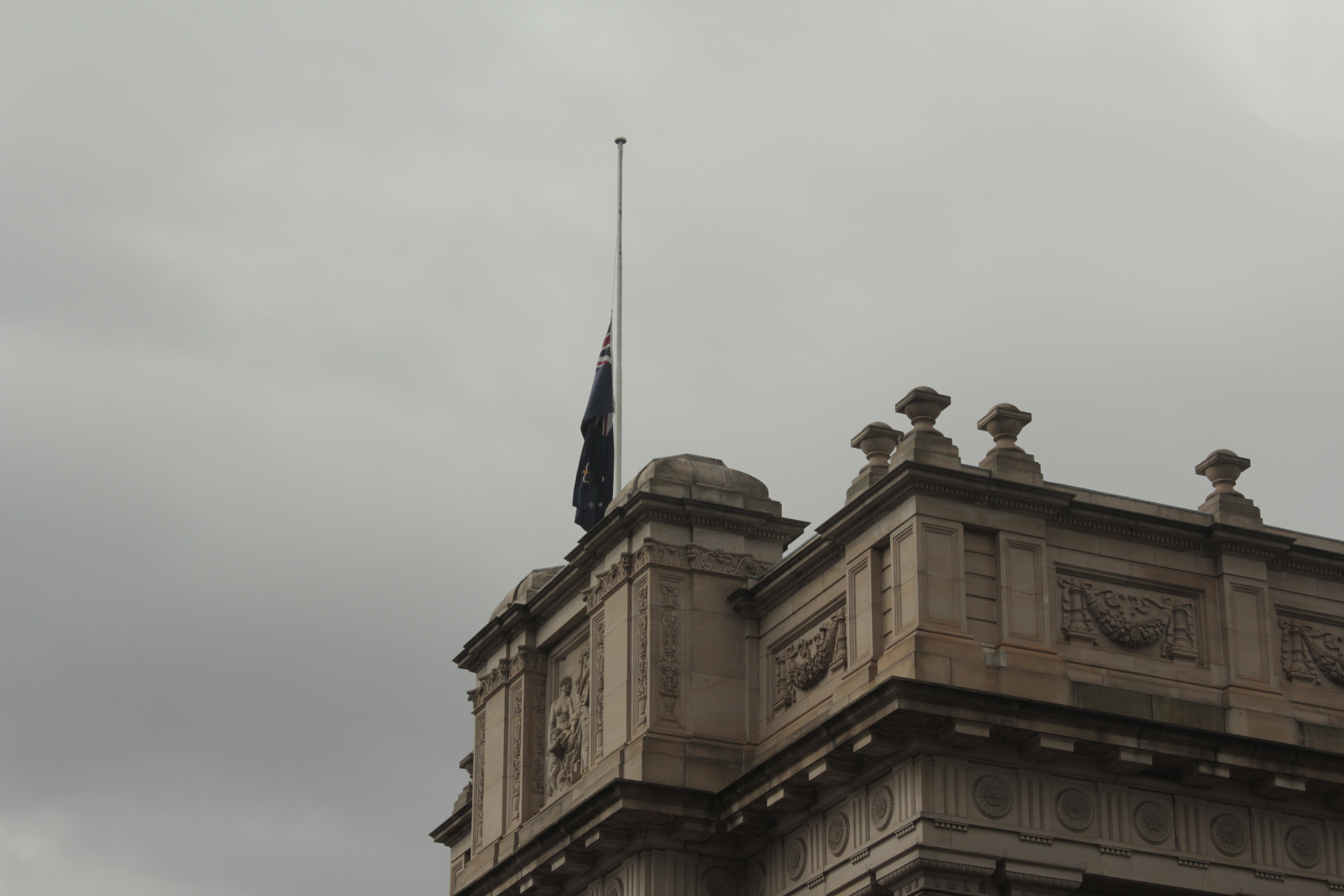
Victorian flag at half-mast on 10th anniversary of the Bali bombings, 12 October 2012

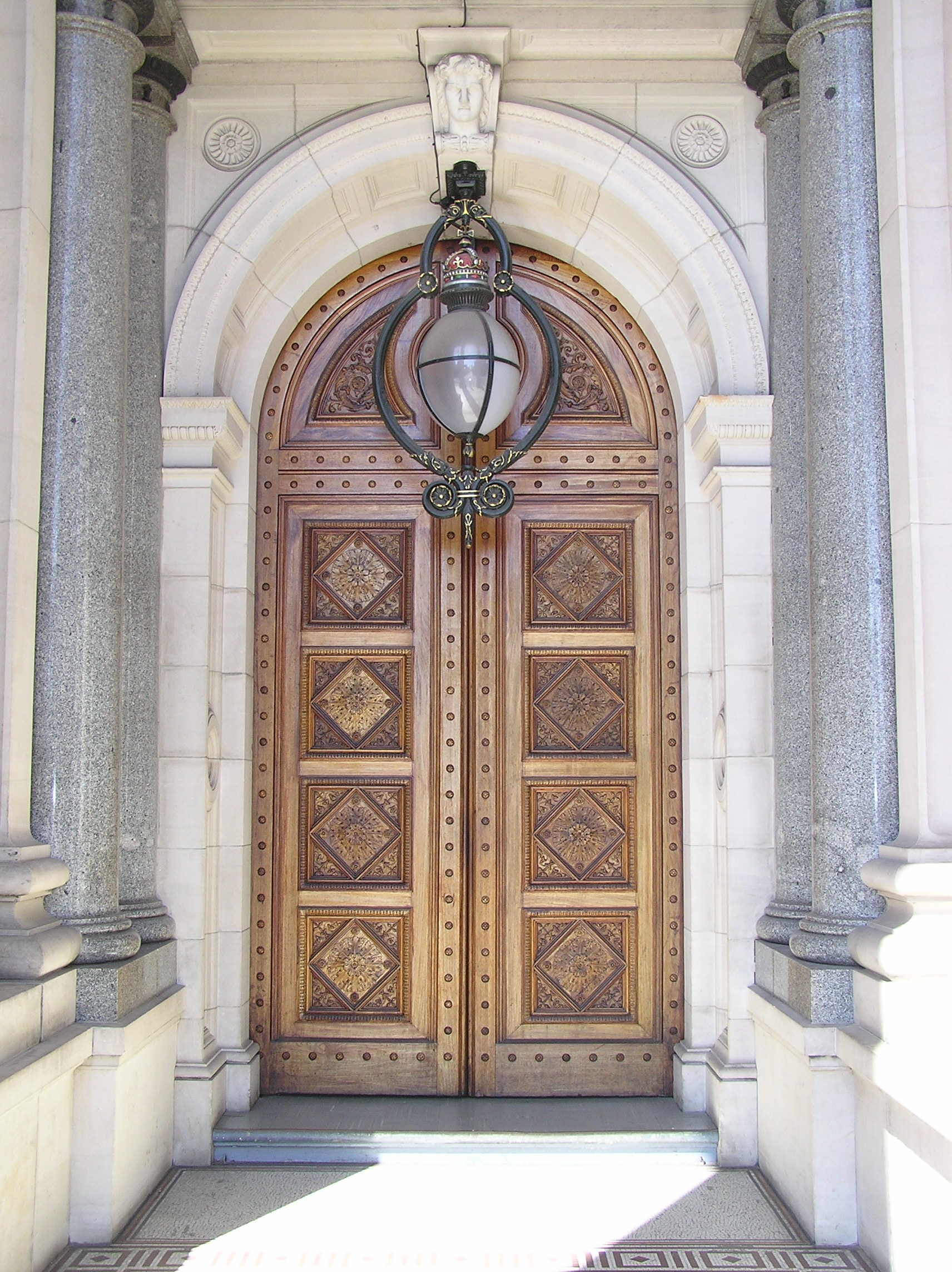
Building Entrance

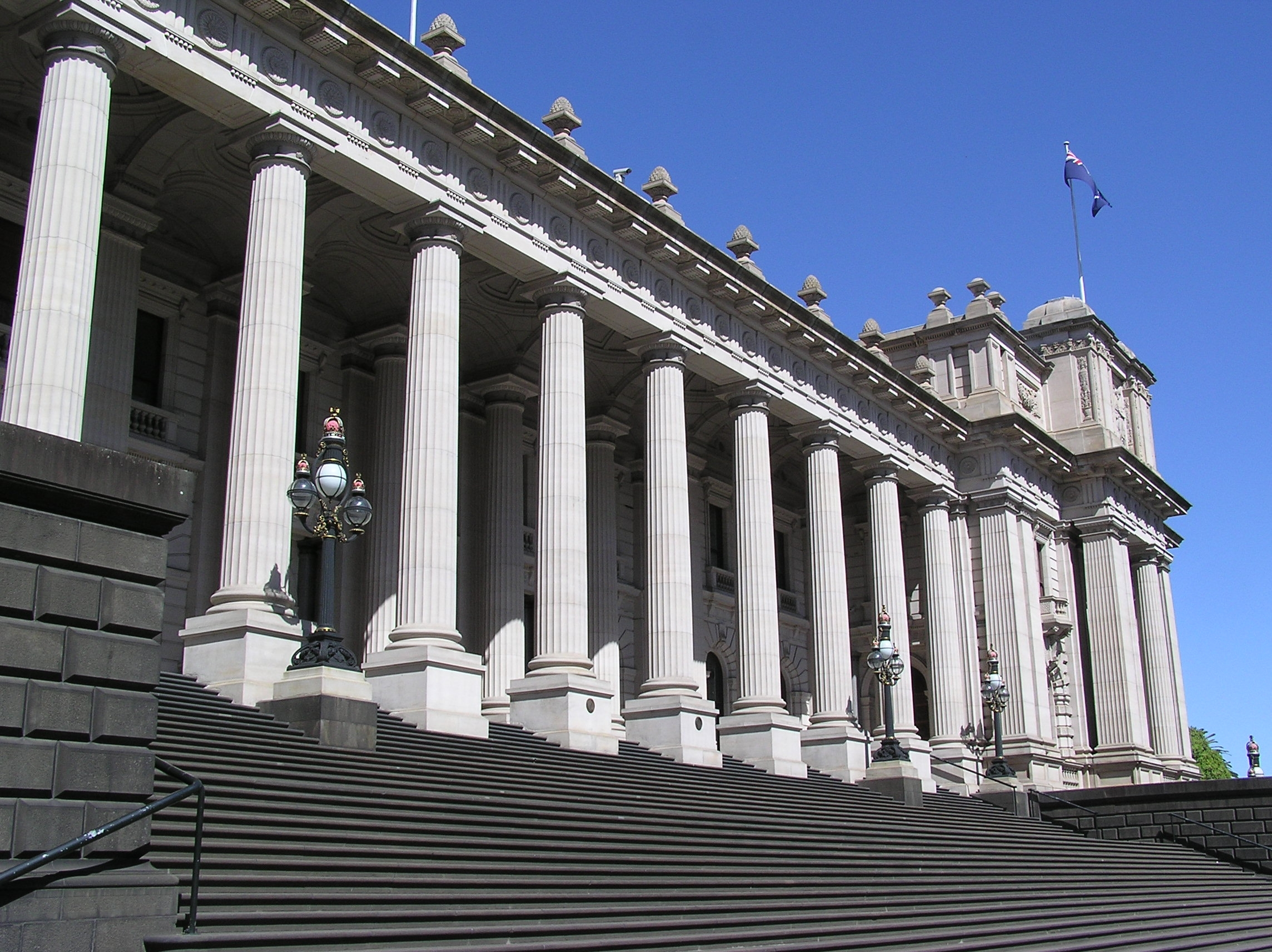
Steps and Facade from Spring Street

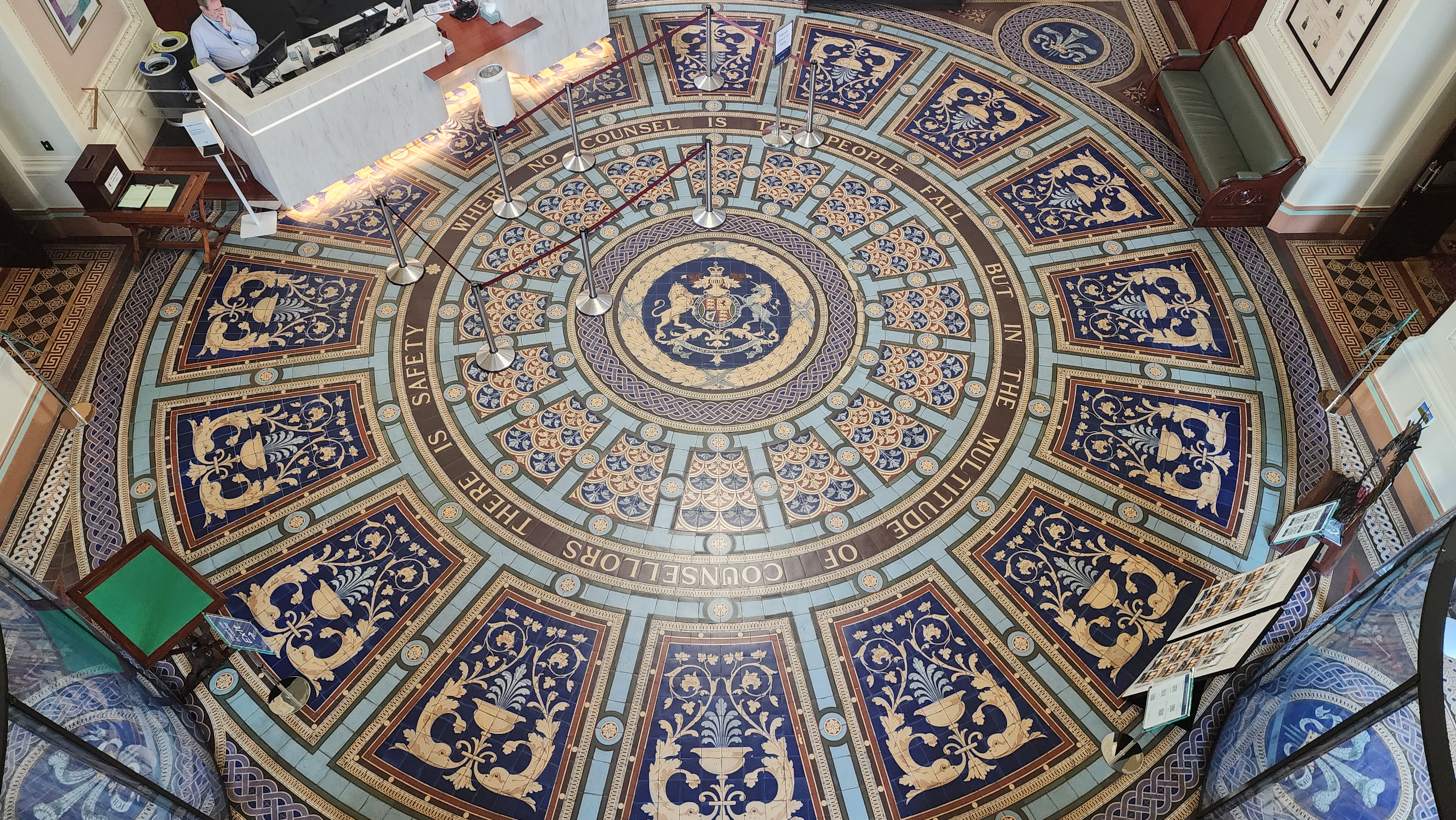
Vestibule tiled floor

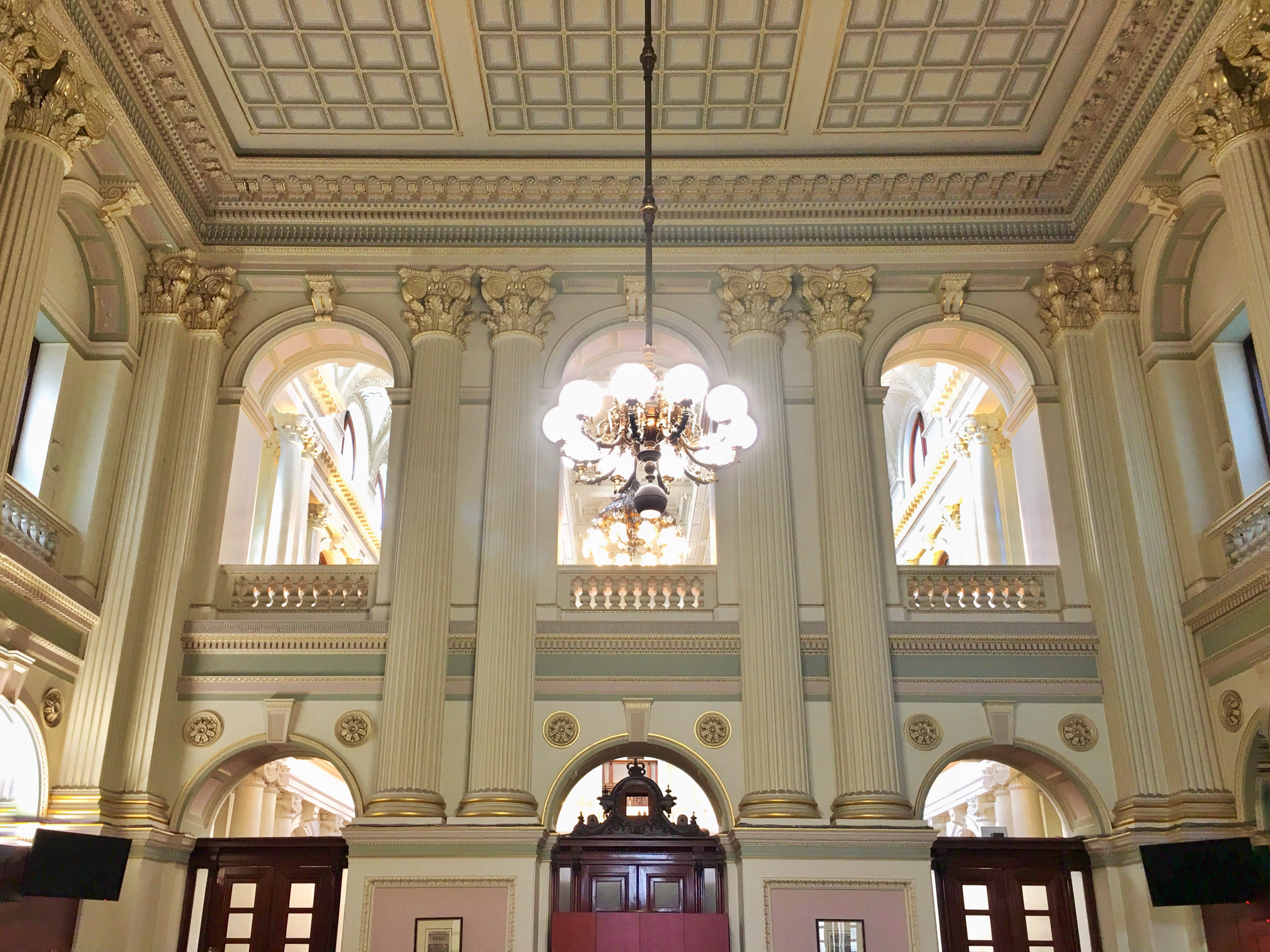
Vestibule

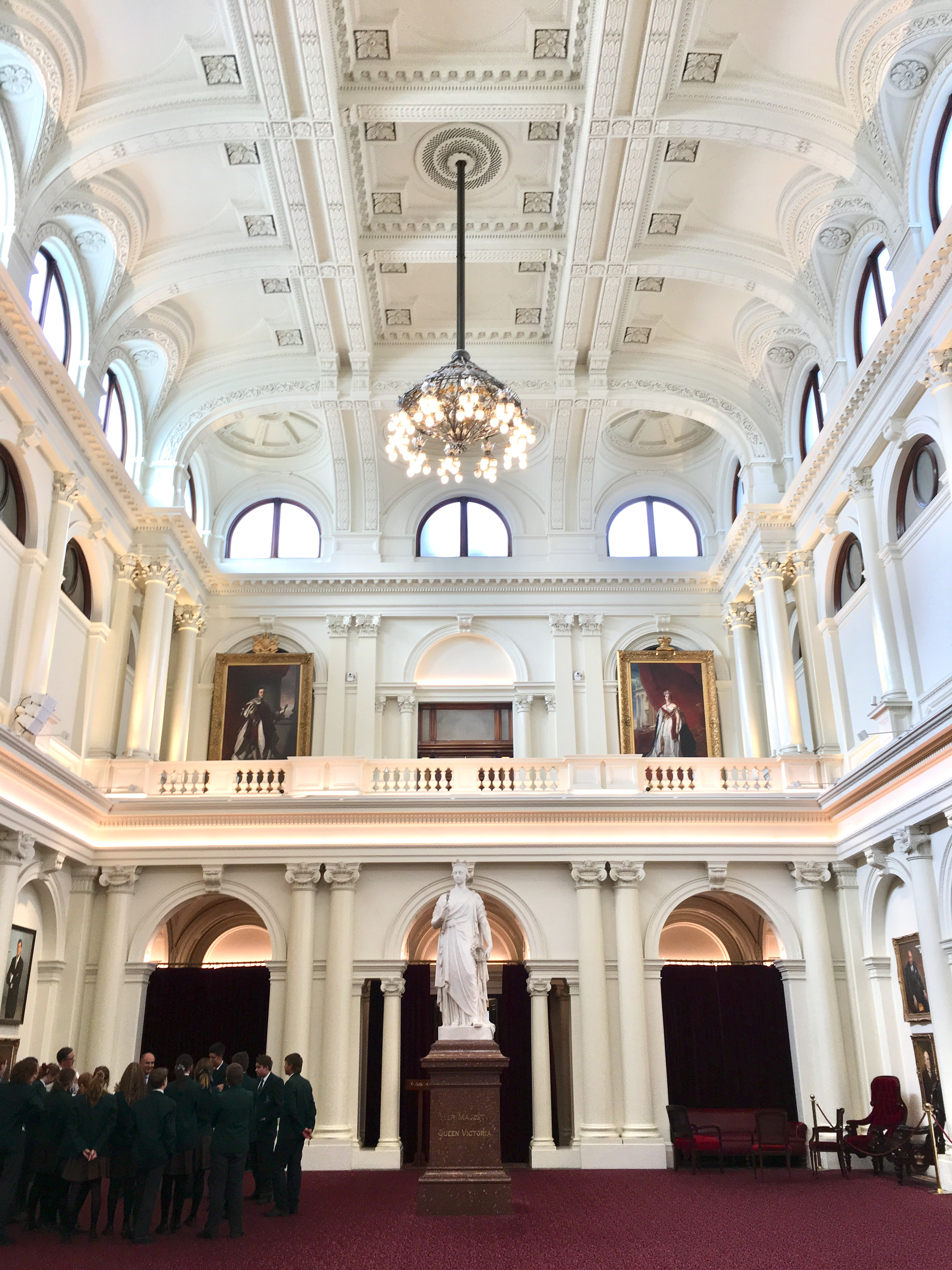
Queen's Hall in Parliament House, with a statue of Queen Victoria

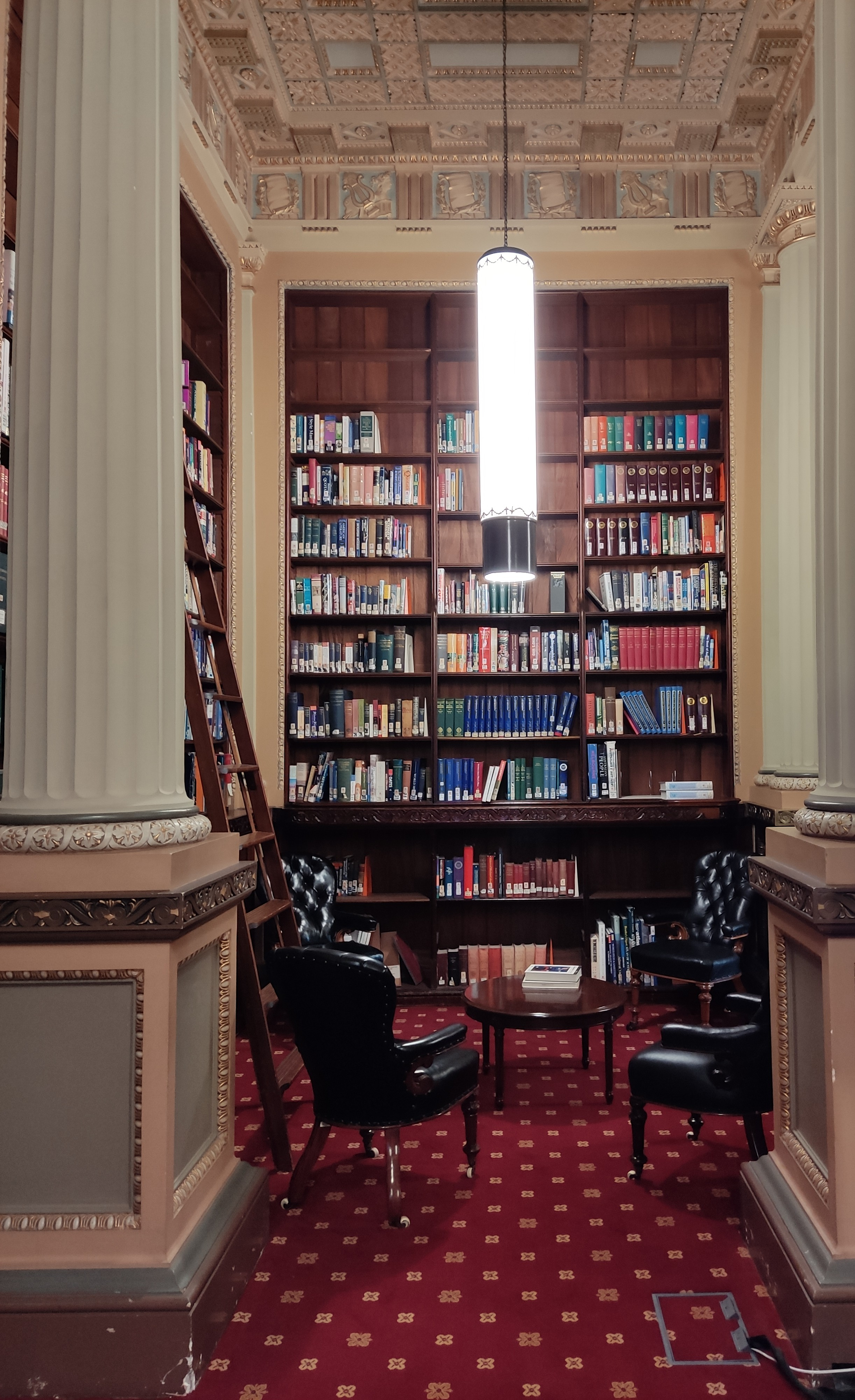
Library

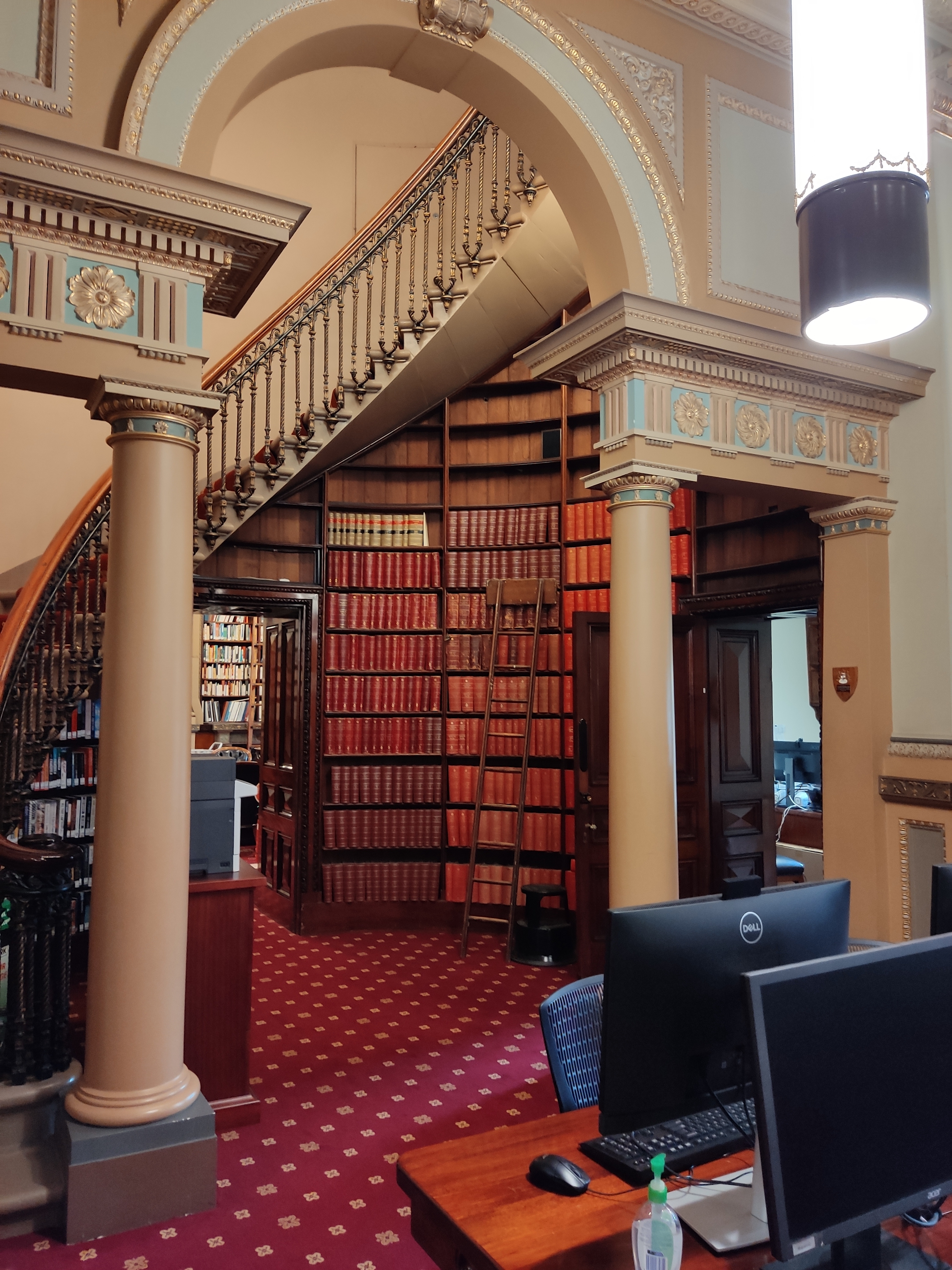
Library

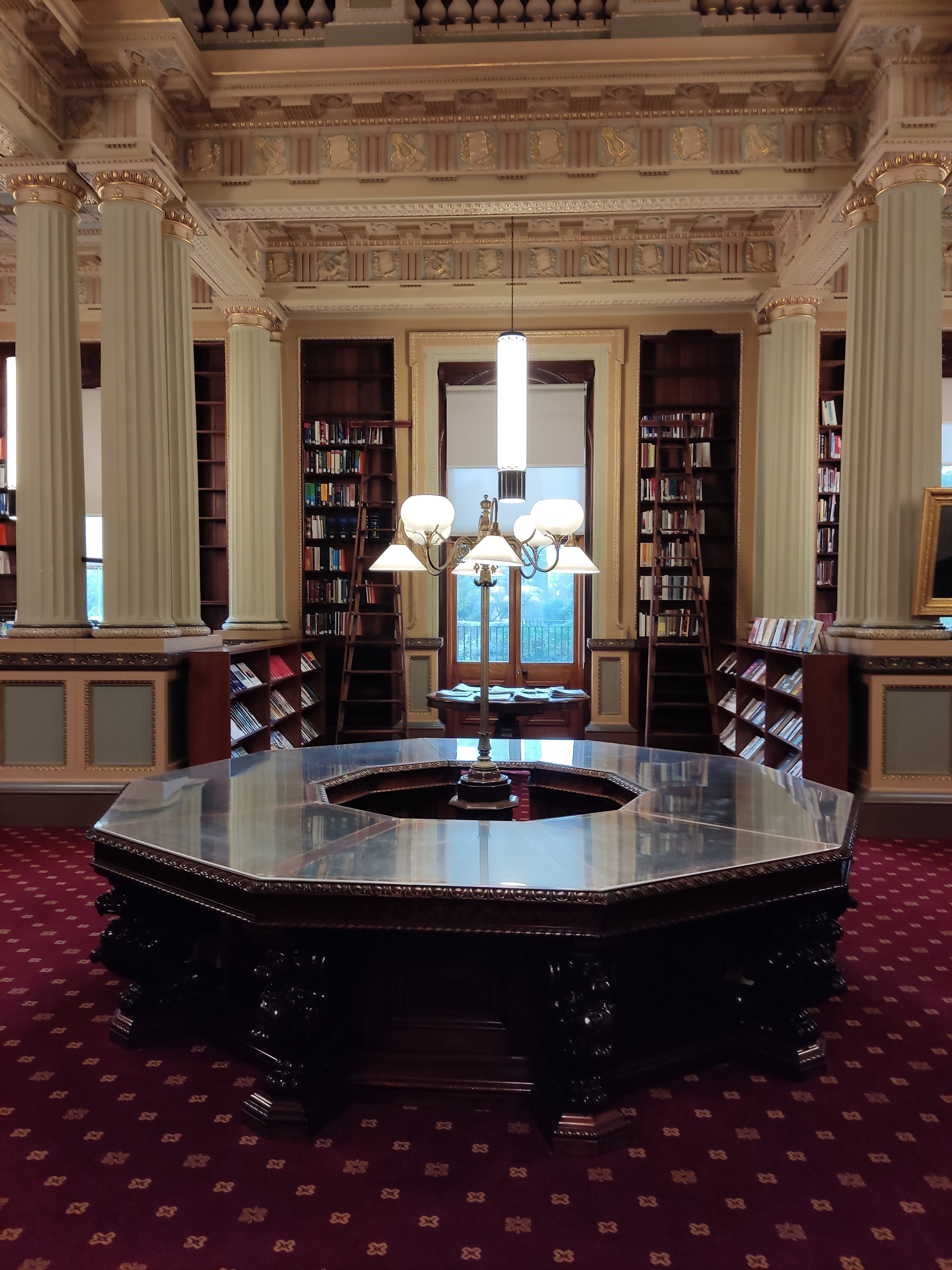
Library

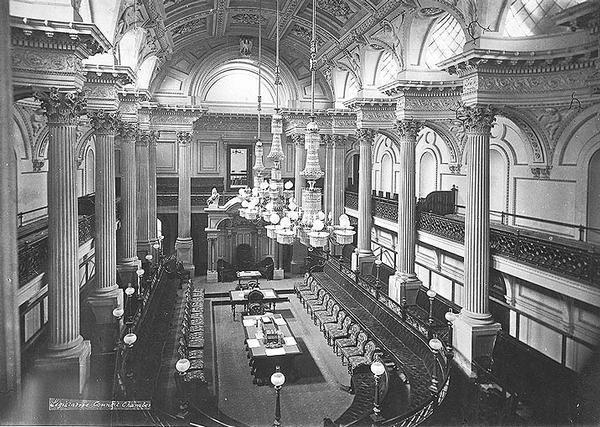
Legislative Council in 1878

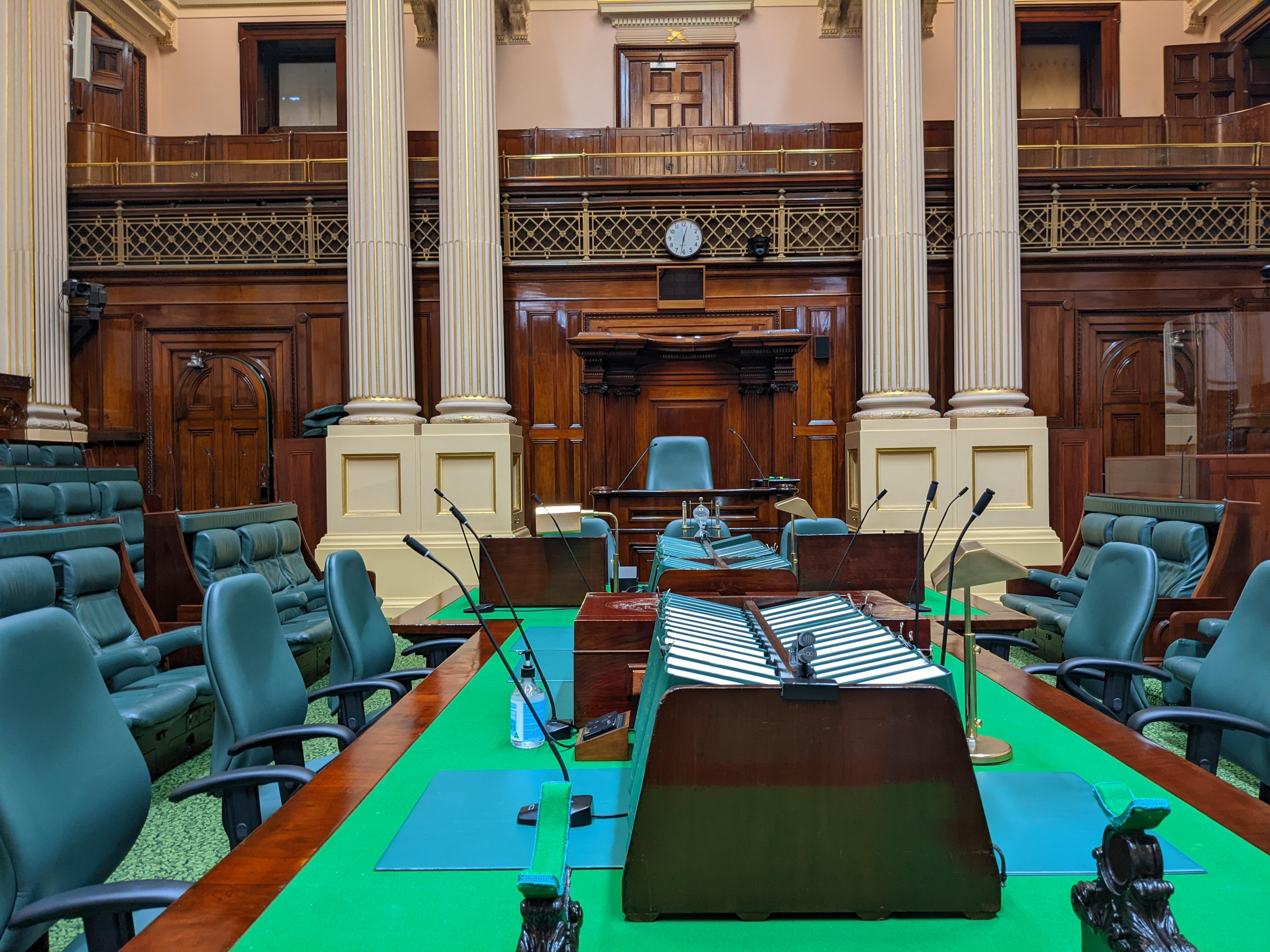
Legislative Assembly Chamber in 2022

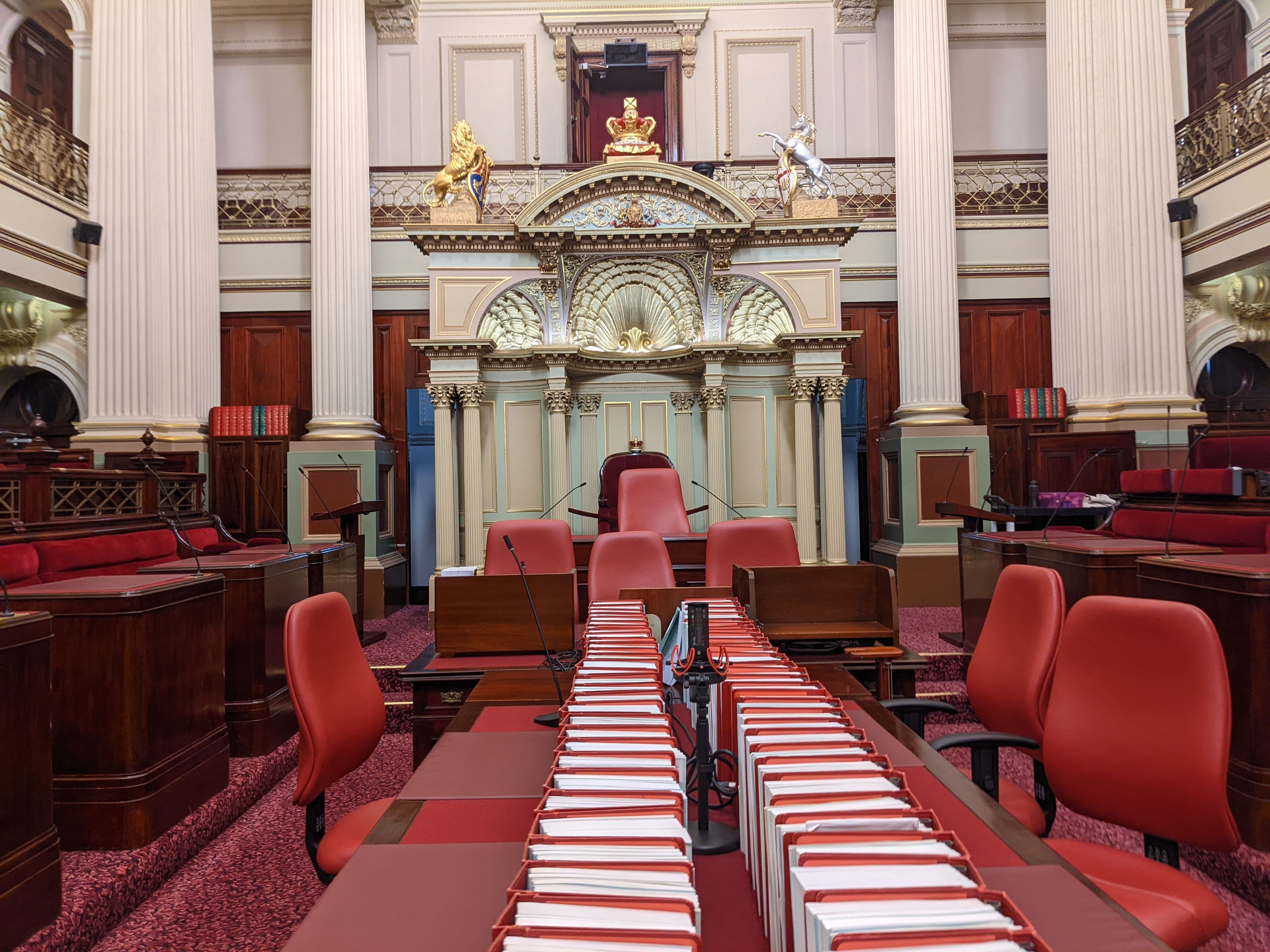
Legislative Council Chamber in 2022

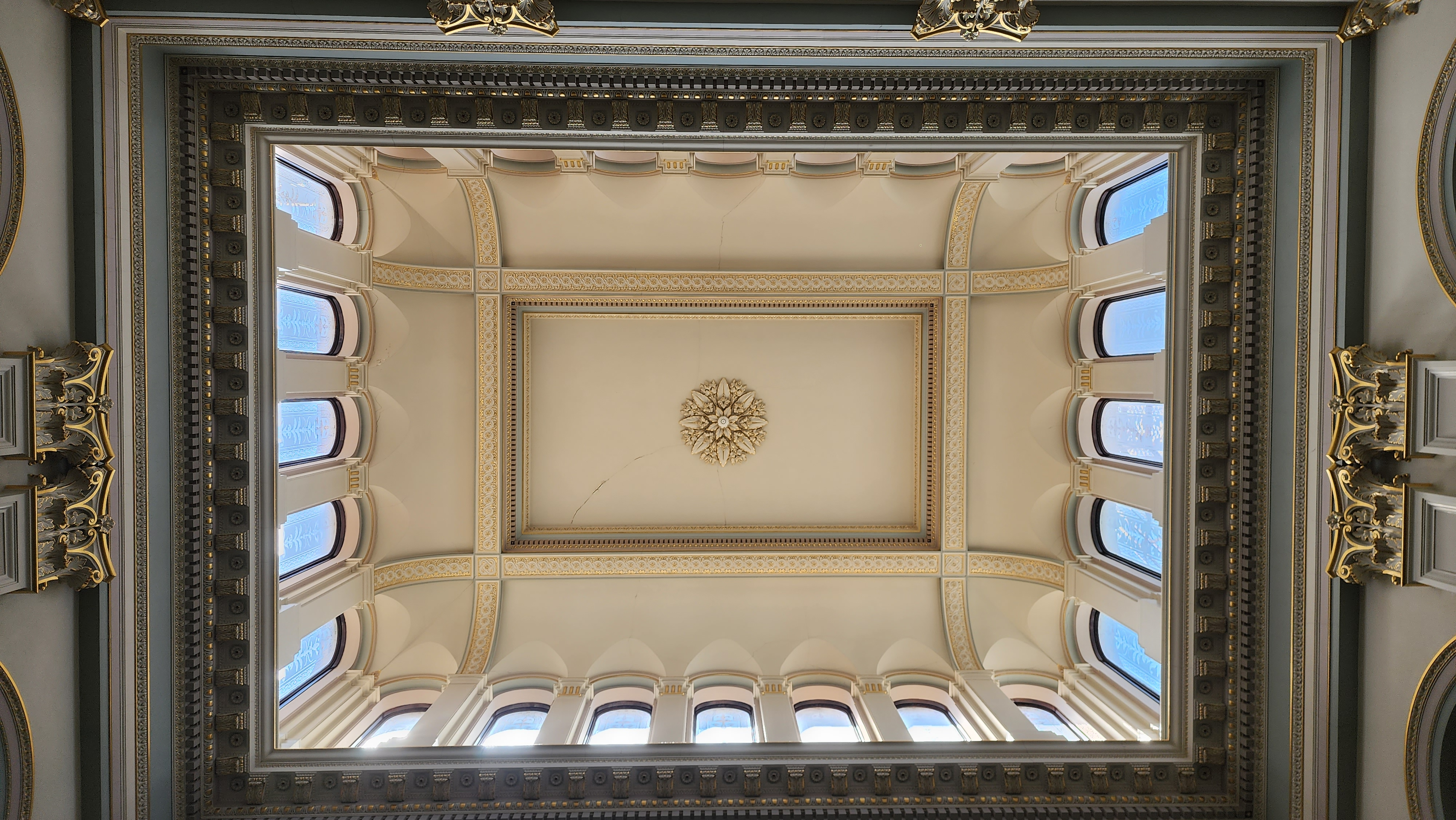
North hall ceiling

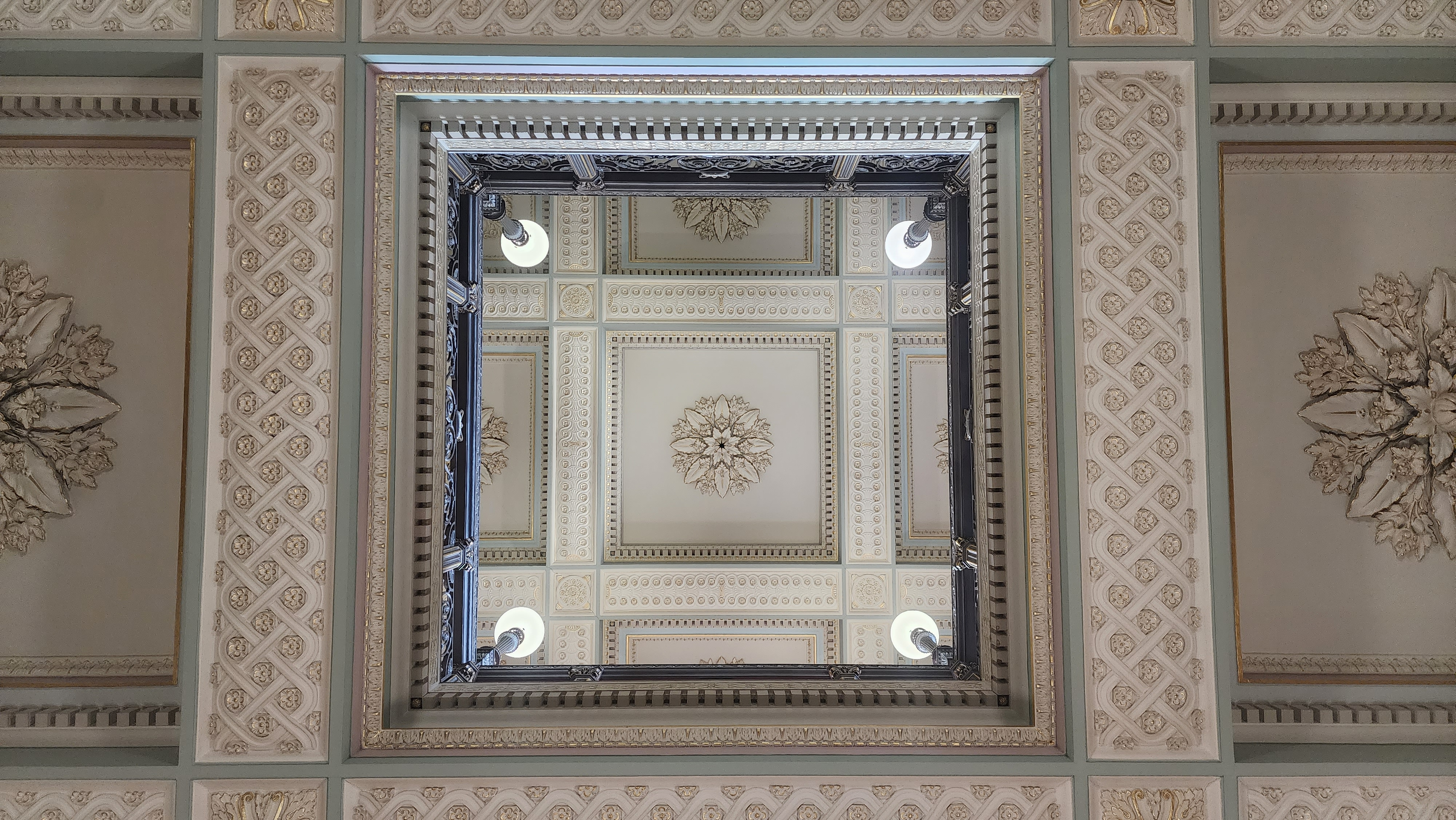
South hall ceiling.jpg

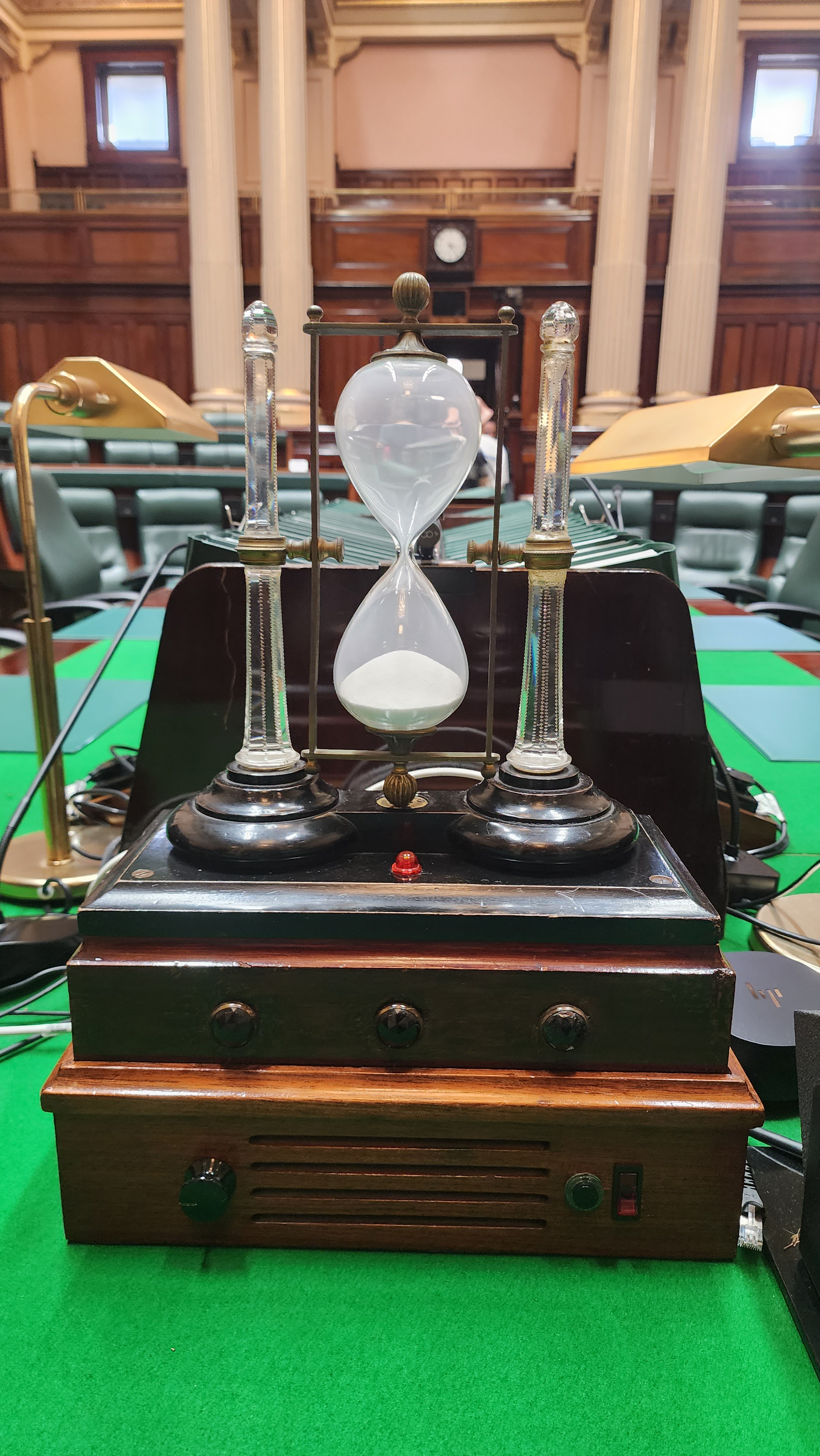
Lower house sand clock

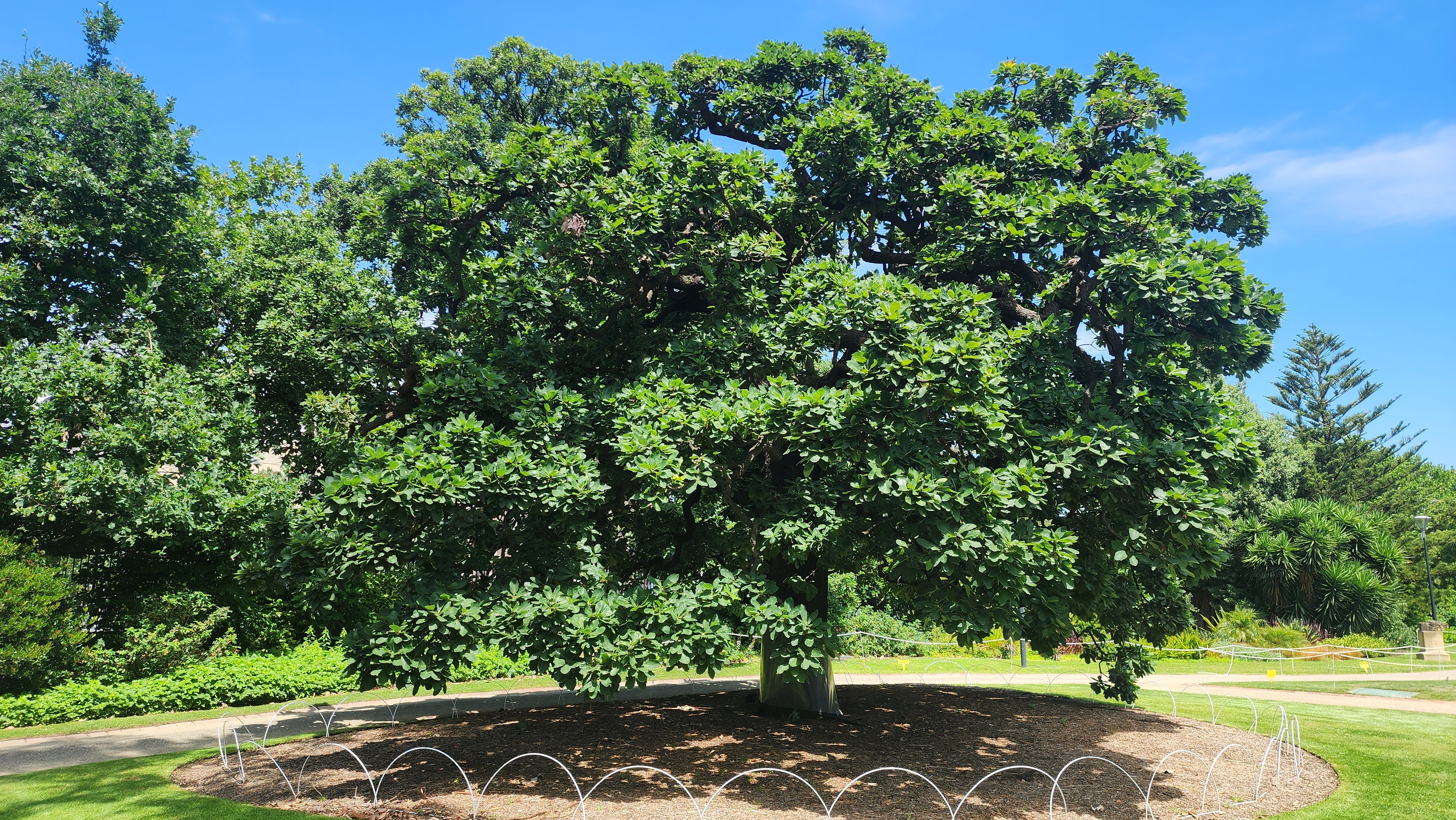
Federal Oak planted by Henry Parkes to commemorate the meeting of the Australian Federal Conference in 1890

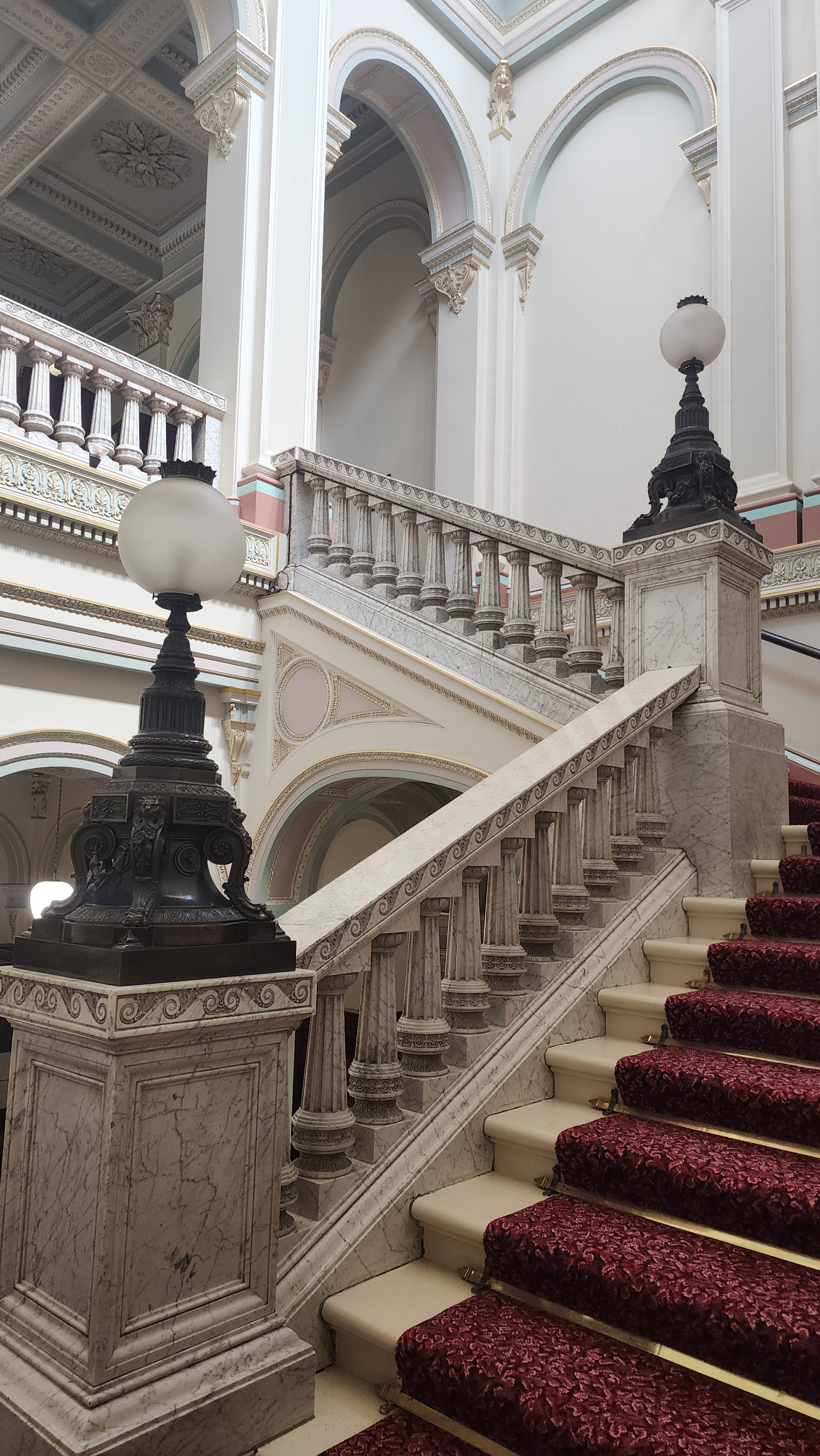
Parliament House, Melbourne staircase

== See also ==
- Architecture of Melbourne
- List of heritage-listed buildings in Melbourne
- Victorian architecture
