= Richard Rawdon Stawell =

Australian medical doctor (1864 - 1935)

Sir Richard Rawdon Stawell KBE, (14 March 1864 – 18 April 1935) was an Australian medical doctor and the President of the Victorian branch of the British Medical Association.

Stawell was born at Kew, Melbourne. Stawell did post-graduate work from 1890 to 1892. In World War I, Stawell served as Lieutenant-Colonel in charge of the medical section with the 3rd Australian General Hospital.

The great immunologist Sir Macfarlane Burnet found him 'a man of much wisdom and immense charm', but with 'a waspish intolerance of stupidity'.
